= 2005 Bruneian cabinet reshuffle =

Brunei cabinet reshuffle undertaken by Hassanal Bolkiah

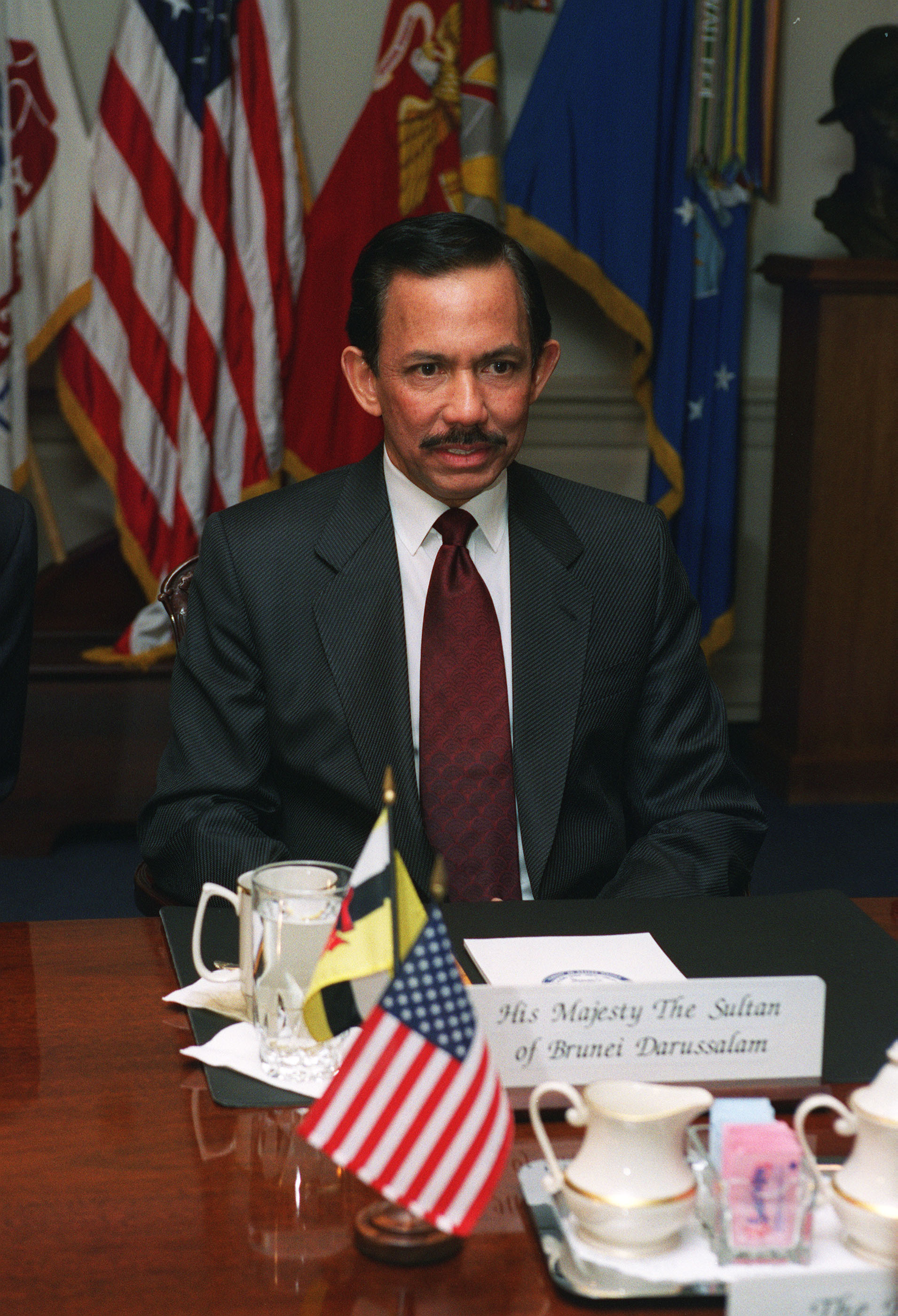
Hassanal Bolkiah

Hassanal Bolkiah carried out the third reshuffle of his government on 24 May 2005, appointing one senior minister, three ministers, and five deputy ministers. The announcement was delivered during a televised speech at 5:20 pm. The previous cabinet had been reshuffled in 1988, followed by the next one in 2010.

The cabinet reshuffle introduced minor adjustments aimed at improving governance, though many ministers retained their positions, and the sultan continued to serve as prime minister, finance minister, and defence minister. The newly expanded cabinet comprised 16 positions, including Crown Prince Al-Muhtadee Billah as senior minister at the Prime Minister's Office (PMO), along with 14 ministers and 10 deputy ministers.

According to the sultan's televised speech, the cabinet reshuffle was aimed at maintaining national security, prosperity, and effective governance. The sultan highlighted Brunei's ability to stand alongside other nations through strong administration, adherence to laws, and disciplined leadership. The reshuffle sought to enhance government efficiency and ensure continued progress in various sectors. The sultan also expressed gratitude to outgoing officials for their contributions, wishing them continued well-being and success.

On 30 May 2005, members of the newly formed cabinet were sworn in for a five-year term during a ceremony at the palace. On 2 June, the sultan chaired the first cabinet meeting following the reshuffle, which was also held at the palace.

== Cabinet-level changes ==
Colour key
- Joined the Cabinet
- Left the Cabinet

Minister	Position before reshuffle	Result of reshuffle
Al-Muhtadee Billah	None	Became Senior Minister at the Prime Minister's Office
Abu Bakar Apong	Minister of Health	Became Minister of Communications
Abdullah Bakar	Permanent Secretary at the Ministry of Communications	Became Minister of Development
Yahya Bakar	Permanent Secretary at the Prime Minister's Office	Became Minister of Energy at the Prime Minister's Office
Mohammad Daud	None	Became Minister of Culture, Youth and Sports
Abdul Rahman Ibrahim	Deputy Minister of Finance	Became Minister of Finance II
Isa Ibrahim	Minister of Home Affairs	Left the government
Ahmad Jumat	Minister of Development	Became Minister of Industry and Primary Resources
Lim Jock Seng	Permanent Secretary at the Ministry of Foreign Affairs and Trade	Became Minister of Foreign Affairs and Trade II
Hussain Mohammad Yusof	Minister of Culture, Youth and Sports	Left the government
Suyoi Osman	Deputy Minister of Education	Became Minister of Health
Zakaria Sulaiman	Minister of Communications	Left the government
Abdul Rahman Taib	Minister of Industry and Primary Resources	Became Minister of Education
Adanan Yusof	Deputy Minister of Home Affairs	Became Minister of Home Affairs

== Junior ministerial changes ==
Colour key
- Joined the Cabinet
- Left the Cabinet

Minister	Position before reshuffle	Result of reshuffle
Hazair Abdullah	Permanent Secretary at the Prime Minister's Office	Became Deputy Minister of Health
Yusoff Abdul Hamid	Ambassador of Brunei to Belgium	Became Deputy Minister of Communications
Hamdillah Abdul Wahab	Managing Director and CEO of Brunei LNG (Note: Non-government position)	Became Deputy Minister of Industry and Primary Resources
Yahya Ibrahim	Deputy Minister of Religious Affairs	Left the government
Eusoff Agaki Ismail	Deputy Minister at the Prime Minister's Office	Left the government
Badaruddin Othman	Acting Chairman of the Public Service Commission	Became Deputy Minister of Religious Affairs
Pengiran Ibnu Basit	Deputy Minister of Defence	Left the government
Pengiran Mohammad	Special Duties Officer (National Education Council) at the Ministry of Education	Became Deputy Minister of Education
Yasmin Umar	Permanent Secretary (Policy and Administration) at the Ministry of Defence	Became Deputy Minister of Defence

== Later changes ==
Between the 2005 and 2010 cabinet reshuffles, several minor changes were introduced. The minor cabinet reshuffle on 22 August 2008 saw Yahya Bakar reappointed as minister of industry and primary resources, replacing Ahmad Jumat. Ahmad, in turn, was reappointed as minister of culture, youth, and sports, succeeding Mohammad Daud. Meanwhile, Mohammad was reappointed as minister of energy at the PMO, taking over from Yahya. In November 2009, Yusoff Abdul Hamid was appointed as ambassador of Brunei to the United States.

Colour key
- Joined the Cabinet
- Left the Cabinet

Minister	Position before reshuffle	Result of reshuffle	Effective from
Yahya Bakar	Minister of Energy at the Prime Minister's Office	Became Minister of Industry and Primary Resources	22 August 2008
Mohammad Daud	Minister of Culture, Youth and Sports	Became Minister of Energy at the Prime Minister's Office	22 August 2008
Ahmad Jumat	Minister of Culture, Youth and Sports	Became Minister of Culture, Youth and Sports	22 August 2008
Yusoff Abdul Hamid	Deputy Minister of Communications	Became Ambassador of Brunei to the United States	November 2009
