= List of government ministries of Brunei =

This is a list of government ministries of Brunei. Ministries are the primary executive branches of the Government of Brunei. There are twelve ministries, which include:

- Prime Minister's Office
- Ministry of Finance and Economy
- Ministry of Defence
- Ministry of Foreign Affairs
- Ministry of Home Affairs
- Ministry of Education
- Ministry of Economy, Trade and Industry
- Ministry of Development
- Ministry of Culture, Youth and Sports
- Ministry of Health
- Ministry of Religious Affairs
- Ministry of Transport and Infocommunications

== See also ==
- Cabinet of Brunei
