= Amedeo Development Corporation =

Investment company in Brunei

- Type: Private
- Industry: Conglomerate
- Founded: 1994
- Founder: Prince Jefri Bolkiah
- Defunct: July 1999
- Fate: Liquidation
- Area served: Brunei
- Key people: Pengiran Muda Abdul Hakeem (MD)
- Services: Construction; Holding; Investment
- Owner: Prince Jefri Bolkiah
- Number of employees: ~2,000 (1998)

Amedeo Development Corporation (Note: The company is also known as the Amedeo Corporation or Amedeo Empire.) (ADC), a private limited company owned by Prince Jefri Bolkiah, was Brunei's largest private company and played a significant role in Brunei's economy. However, the company faced considerable economic challenges during the 1997 Asian financial crisis, compounded by fluctuations in oil prices. In 1998, Brunei entered a moderate recession following the collapse of Amedeo, whose ambitious projects had previously driven domestic economic growth. Despite these setbacks, moderate yet steady economic growth was eventually restored, aided by rising oil prices and the successful reorganisation of Amedeo's investments.

== History ==
=== Founding years ===
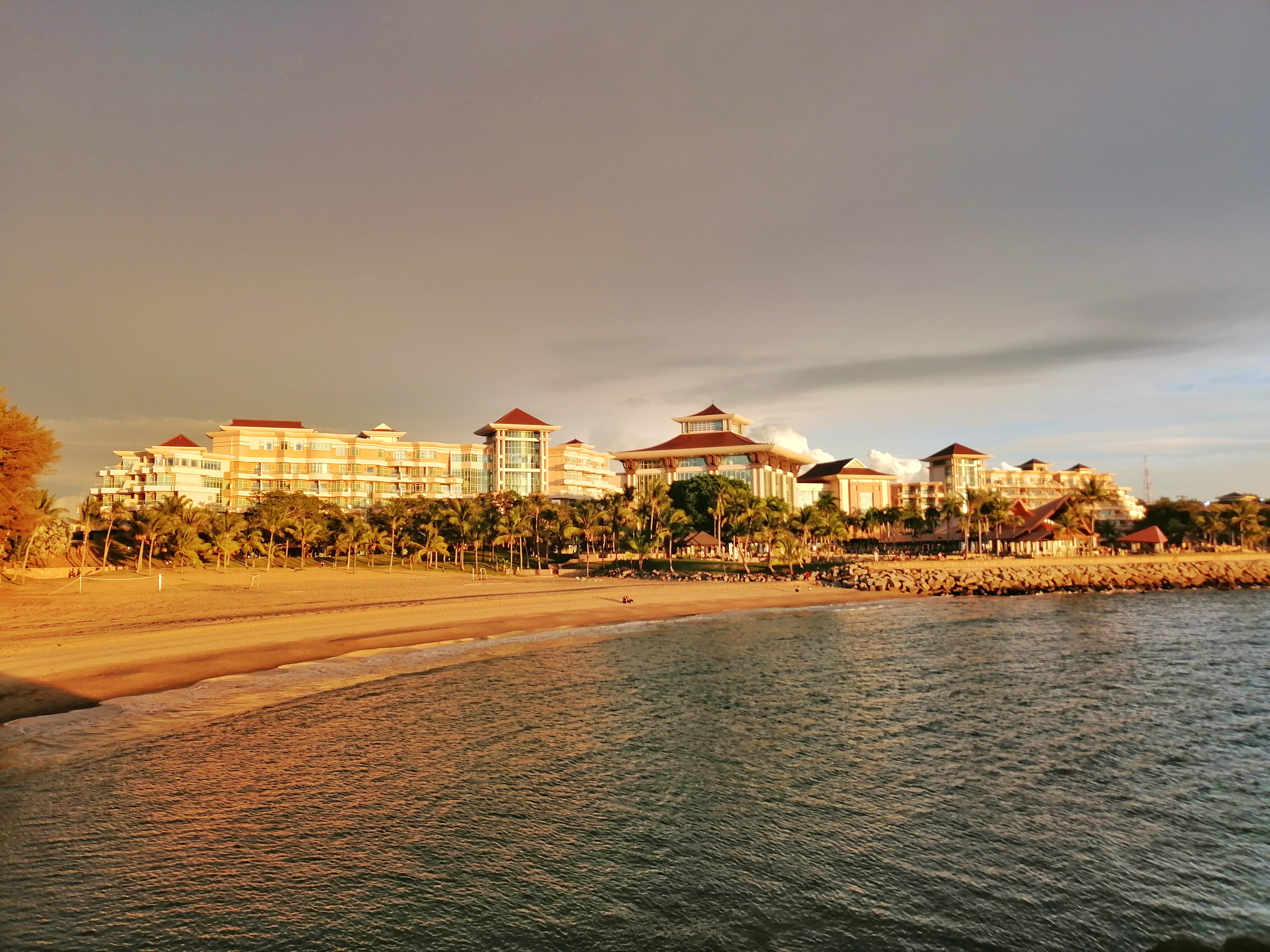
The Empire Hotel, formerly the Empire Hotel and Country Club

In 1992, Jefri Bolkiah was appointed minister of finance and chairman of the Brunei Investment Agency (BIA), tasked with managing the sultanate's extensive oil wealth. In this role, he launched Amedeo, an ambitious initiative to develop a luxurious residential, commercial, and entertainment complex in Brunei. The company appears to have been called after the artist Amedeo Modigliani, whose creations the prince had purchased. Additionally, he appointed Pengiran Muda Abdul Hakeem, his teenage son, as managing director.

Among its notable projects were an aircraft hangar at Brunei International Airport, the Jerudong International School, the Empire Hotel and Country Club, Jerudong Park, the Berakas Power Station, the DST Corporate Tower, the Jerudong Marina, Amedeo Fishing, and businesses involved in insurance. Exclusive to the royal family and their guests, the Jerudong Park Polo Club featured a clubhouse, sports fields, and 200 imported Argentine horses, highlighting the opulence of Jefri Bolkiah's vision.

=== Bankruptcy and liquidation ===
Over the years, Jefri Bolkiah's extravagant lifestyle significantly drained Brunei's oil wealth. His lavish expenditures included constructing palaces, apartment complexes, and marinas; acquiring luxury hotels, 2,000 cars, 17 aircraft (including a private Airbus A310), multiple yachts, fine jewellery, and over a dozen residences. He also maintained an extensive entourage of spouses, mistresses, and numerous children. This unchecked profligacy ultimately left the sultanate's finances severely strained.

Jefri Bolkiah invested more than £5.5 billion in various developments, much of it sourced from the BIA. However, by mid-1998, growing concerns over his financial mismanagement—particularly from his brother, Prince Mohamed Bolkiah—led to Jefri Bolkiah losing control of Amedeo. In the fallout, the government took decisive action, including the dismissal of Pengiran Bahrin, the permanent secretary of the Ministry of Justice and Justice Minister (also Attorney General), in June 1998. Six months later, the ministry itself was disbanded.

Jefri Bolkiah has spent B$5 billion on several initiatives, the company left 300 creditors with $1 billion in debt. At the same time as this financial catastrophe, Jefri Bolkiah was sued by the BIA and the Bruneian government for allegedly misusing an estimated $15 billion in state funds. Jefri Bolkiah agreed to repay the funds and assets he was accused of embezzling while serving as the head of BIA and finance minister as part of an out-of-court settlement reached in 1998. Due in part to the unfavourable investment climate and in part to the substantial capital losses resulting from the collapse of Amedeo, in which it appears to have invested substantial funds, the BIA, which controls the majority of state investment revenues, saw a sharp decline in the returns on its portfolio.

In an attempt to recover, Jefri sold off several of his businesses, including the Asprey Group, the jeweller Hamilton and Inches, and the couturier Tomasz Starzewski. He briefly returned to Brunei in October 1998, but his presence failed to satisfy the Sultan, leading to his departure again in July 1999. During that same month, Andersen Consulting confirmed Amedeo's inability to settle debts estimated at US$3.7 billion, the majority of which was owed to the BIA. The Brunei High Court also formally liquidated Amedeo, leaving creditors unpaid.

The macroeconomic problems Brunei was facing were greatly worsened by the bankruptcy of the Amedeo group of firms, which was led by Jefri Bolkiah. After battling since the beginning of 1998, the business finally failed in the middle of the year due to massive debt. The overall debt is estimated to be between US$7 billion and $8 billion, although estimates vary greatly, ranging from $1 billion to $16 billion. Amedeo's extensive portfolio comprised 27 businesses with holdings in industries including retail, insurance, education, and fishing, both domestically and abroad. Its biggest setbacks, however, were in Brunei's construction industry, where large power generation projects in partnership with Siemens were also impacted, and projects like the Jerudong hotel complex, which was almost finished, were left on hold. About 2,000 employees—mostly foreign nationals—were laid off as a result of the collapse, which also seriously harmed company morale. Since Brunei's economy depends heavily on the construction sector, the loss of these jobs had a significant impact on the local economy.

The sultan assumed direct leadership of the BIA and issued an order to retrieve the misplaced money. In order to prevent the mismanagement linked to the Amedeo crisis, the BIA was later reorganised and put directly under his supervision.

=== Investigation ===
The demise of Amedeo has been marred by serious accusations, including claims that the company may have embezzled money from the BIA, which Jefri Bolkiah had led until his removal in July 1998. In response, the government established a task force to investigate the collapse, with a report expected in early 1999. Forensic accountants from Arthur Andersen and staff from the Bank of England were brought in to examine the complex financial discrepancies between Amedeo and the BIA. However, Jefri Bolkiah's legal attempt to block KPMG from sharing information on his private financial transactions hindered the investigation, with a UK court upholding his suit in November, potentially complicating the task force's work.

After Jefri Bolkiah's removal, the government appointed Arthur Andersen to manage Amedeo's executive operations and Freshfields as its unofficial legal advisers. Following their recommendations, the government decided to dissolve Amedeo in 1999, resulting in £350 million owed to about 300 creditors and billions of pounds in losses for the government. To navigate the complex conflicts with creditors, Arthur Andersen and Freshfields continued their work with the government and BIA. Though the exact cost of their services is unclear, a local newspaper reported that by 2000, their combined fees had surpassed £190 million, a stark contrast to the under £2 million cost of Global Evergreen, the government-appointed company responsible for settling Amedeo's debts. This disparity highlighted the inefficiencies and high costs of the earlier crisis management.

Global Evergreen was chaired by Abdul Aziz Umar, the minister of education and health, and also included Pengiran Rakawi Sabli, Jefri Bolkiah's confidential secretary, and Joseph Hage, his British legal counsel. The company adopted a consensus-driven "local approach" to debt settlement and quickly engaged with the creditors' committee of inspection and Amedeo's liquidators. By 2001, it became clear that resolving the Amedeo situation was crucial, particularly as Brunei sought to enhance its international profile and establish itself as an offshore financial hub. In October 2001, the government announced that Global Evergreen had been established to address the Amedeo crisis.

Global Evergreen implemented a "banding" system to handle claims, offering varying percentages for different levels of debt: 70% for claims between B$300,000 and $500,000, 50% for those up to $750,000, 40% for claims up to $1 million, and 27.5% for those between $1 million and $5 million. Creditors with claims under $300,000 were paid in full, and over half of them agreed to the deal within a week. Despite still unresolved questions about the source of Global Evergreen's funding, the public welcomed the swift conclusion of the costly and protracted Amedeo saga.

The task force's preliminary report in September 1999 confirmed that some BIA funds had likely been misappropriated, though the exact amount, held as a state secret, remained unclear and was to be determined in the final report. The public release of this report became a test of the government's newly proclaimed commitment to "openness and transparency." Rumours of financial difficulties affecting the parity link between the Bruneian and Singaporean dollars proved unfounded, with Singapore strongly supporting the currency link. Abdul Aziz, Jefri Bolkiah's successor at the BIA, acknowledged challenges in tracking funds but argued that these issues were exaggerated and promised a more transparent accounting system in the future.

== Aftermath ==
=== Auction ===
Intense court battles raged for two years, with multiple parties embroiled in lawsuits and little tangible progress being made. In 2000, however, Jefri Bolkiah reached a private settlement with the Sultan, temporarily quieting the legal chaos. The case attracted global attention in 2001 when Amedeo's liquidators, Foo, Kon & Tan of Singapore, held a highly publicised auction of the company's assets. The auction showcased the extravagant nature of Amedeo's acquisitions, featuring over 100 chandeliers, gold-plated toilet brush holders, and even an Apache attack helicopter simulator. Some of Jefri Bolkiah's 2,000 vehicles remain parked outside Jerudong Park, concealed behind "For Sale" signs. Meanwhile, the sultan repurposed Jerudong's equestrian facilities, turning over all but 93 ponies to an Indonesian company and placing the centre under private management.

Unable to reach an agreement with Amedeo's creditors, the liquidators decided to auction over 10,000 of the company's possessions over six days. The event, dubbed the "mother of all auctions" by the press, was held by the British company SHM Smith Hodgkinson International. Despite the global attention it attracted, the auction raised only B$9 million, a fraction of what creditors had expected. The auction's execution was widely criticised for its impact on Brunei's international reputation and its low returns.

Following the company's collapse, its assets were auctioned. Items sold included approximately 8,000 tons of marble slabs, a marble-processing facility, timber, construction equipment and furnishings. Several incomplete projects, including residential developments, commercial buildings and a palace, remained unfinished.

=== Political reform ===
Amid rising public pressure from the Amedeo crisis, the government tightened political control and raised wages for state employees, who made up 80% of the workforce. An organisation responsible for long-term planning, the Brunei Darussalam Economic Council, was founded earlier in September 1998 to guide the new development strategy, while public sector pay and pensions were significantly raised in July 1998 to influence public opinion. The Asian financial crises of 1997 and the Amedeo crisis of 1998 influenced the government's conservative focus on economic recovery over broader political reforms. The lingering fallout from Amedeo's collapse and subsequent administrative changes underscored the delicate balance between reform and the need to restore public and international confidence, highlighting the close relationship between financial stability and Brunei's political evolution.

In 2001, significant bureaucratic changes followed the ongoing fallout from Amedeo's failure. Pengiran Ismail was abruptly dismissed from his role as minister of development in June, with no public explanation provided. Despite his denials of involvement in the crisis, his leadership during Amedeo's peak construction phase cast doubt on his role during this turbulent period. Ahmad Jumat, the deputy minister of education, was appointed acting minister of development, while Yakub Abu Bakar, a permanent secretary and former acting director of the BIA, replaced Selamat Munap as deputy minister of finance. Selamat's dismissal raised speculation, with some suggesting his recent proposals for a personal income tax and reductions to senior officials' benefits may have contributed to his removal. Given his experience and forthright nature, his departure was widely regarded as a significant loss during a time of administrative and financial upheaval.

=== Foreign workers ===
The building industry in Brunei, which had mainly depended on foreign technical staff, was significantly impacted by Amedeo's demise. The company which employed thousands of people from nations like Thailand and India, was instrumental in the development of Brunei's infrastructure in the 1990s. Indian businesses, especially Galfar, which is based in Oman, rose to prominence in the sector. After entering Brunei in 1987, Galfar swiftly rose to prominence in the industry and was named the "best contractor" for six years in a row, from 1991 to 1996. Around 1,000 Indian and Thai labourers were employed by the enterprise during its height, and they worked on significant projects such public buildings, bridges, and highways.

However, a major change was brought about by the demise of Amedeo and Brunei's Bruneianisation program, which sought to lessen the country's reliance on foreign labor in the public sector. Foreign workers, especially those from Thailand, were repatriated as a result of the stalling of numerous construction projects. Even though there was a significant drop in the number of Indian workers in Brunei's construction industry, the majority of them were not sent home. Instead, a large number of them moved to other areas of the nation, utilising their advanced degrees. For instance, Galfar cut its Indian staff from 1,000 to 600 as the industry adapted to the post-Amedeo economic climate.

== Responses and analysis ==
The local media and official circles in Brunei downplayed the financial magnitude of Amedeo's collapse and criticised foreign coverage, while government representatives consistently denied claims of rapid asset sales to support the BIA or Amedeo's capital reserves. However, the scale of the crisis was underscored by an unusually candid statement from Pengiran Ismail, the deputy-chair of the task force and minister of development, who admitted, "I wish I knew what is going on. I'm unsure of what went wrong." Such frankness about financial matters, especially involving a member of the royal family, was highly uncharacteristic and indicative of the turmoil the collapse had caused within the administration.

Jefri Bolkiah and his family benefited from the great bulk of the initiatives, according to Ignatius Stephen in 2000, a journalist for the Borneo Bulletin. Just 10% of the US$6.2 billion that the BIA and other creditors invested in Amedeo might be considered to have gone toward infrastructure upgrades, such as the construction of an international school, a telecommunications tower, and the Berakas power station. These projects, which were constructed by temporary foreign labour, did not increase Bruneian citizens' employment or skill levels. Amedeo's construction boom, which is currently reflected in the large number of abandoned projects in Brunei.
