= Ahmad Jumat =

Bruneian politician (born 1941)

Yang Dimuliakan Pehin Orang Kaya Setia Pahlawan Dato Seri Setia Ahmad Jumat PSNB SPMB DSLJ PJK PKL
- أحمد جمعة
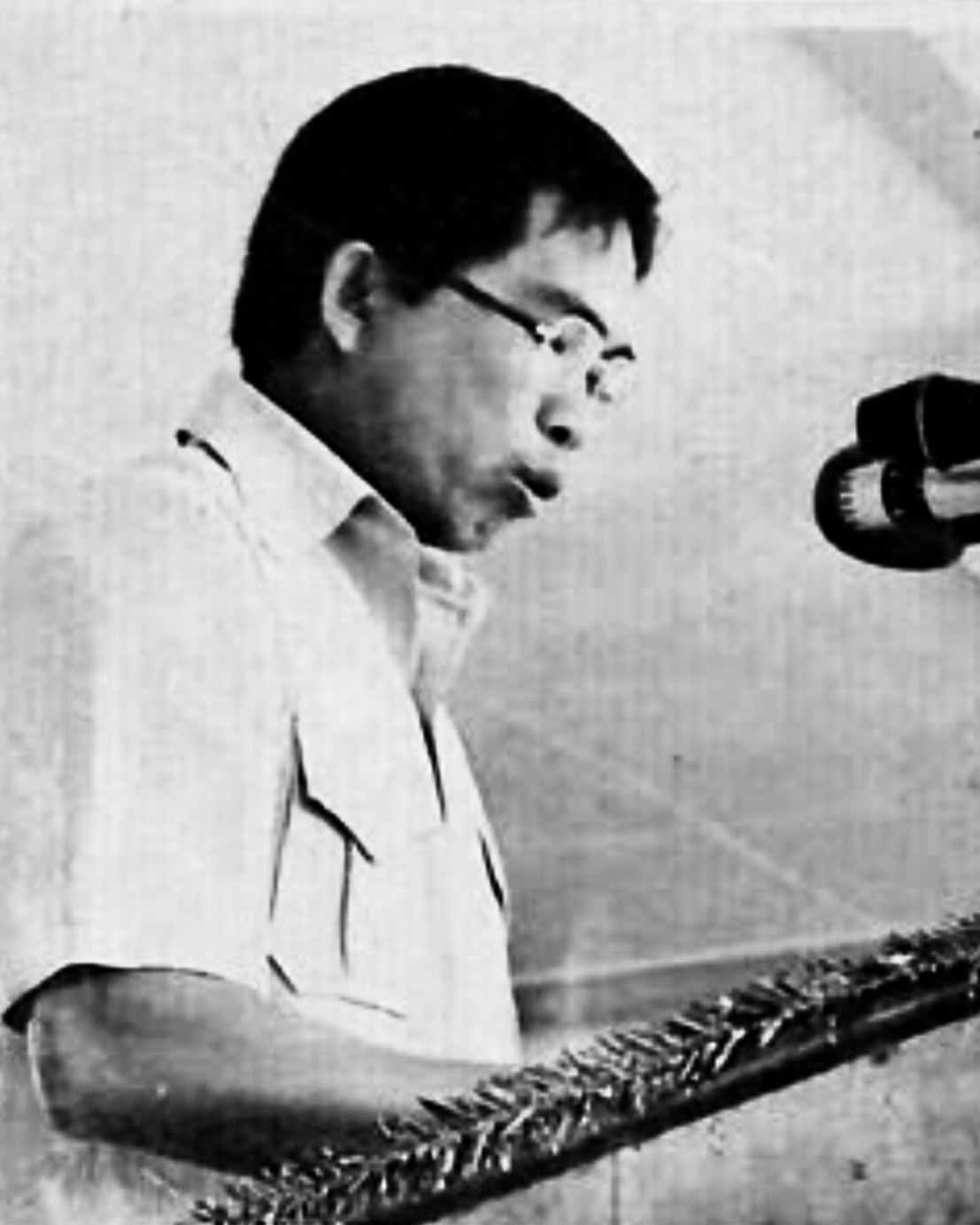

4th Minister of Culture, Youth and Sports
- In office 22 August 2008 – 29 May 2010
- Monarch: Hassanal Bolkiah
- Preceded by: Mohammad Daud
- Succeeded by: Hazair Abdullah

2nd Minister of Industry and Primary Resources
- In office 24 May 2005 – 22 August 2008
- Deputy: Hamdillah Abdul Wahab
- Preceded by: Abdul Rahman Taib
- Succeeded by: Yahya Bakar

3rd Minister of Development
- In office 17 May 2002 – 22 August 2008
- Preceded by: Pengiran Ismail
- Succeeded by: Abdullah Bakar

1st Deputy Minister of Education
- In office 21 October 1986 – 2001
- Minister: Abdul Aziz Umar; Abdul Rahman Taib
- Preceded by: Office established
- Succeeded by: Suyoi Osman

Personal details
- Born: 23 November 1941 (age 84) Muara, Brunei–Muara, Brunei
- Education: University of Malaya (BA); University of Alberta (MEd); University of Southern California (D.Ed)
- Profession: Politician; civil servant

Ahmad bin Haji Jumat (born 23 November 1941) is a Bruneian aristocrat, civil servant and politician who is the current representative of Brunei Darussalam to the ASEAN Intergovernmental Commission on Human Rights (AICHR). He formerly held the position of Minister of Culture, Youth and Sports (MCYS) from 2008 to 2010, Minister of Industry and Primary Resources (MIPR) from 2005 to 2008, and Minister of Development (MoD) from 2002 to 2008.

== Early life and education ==
Ahmad was born in Muara on 23 November 1941. His education background includes a Bachelor of Arts (BA) from the University of Malaya in 1967, Master of Education (MEd) from the University of Alberta in 1973, and Doctor of Education (D.Ed.) from the University of Southern California in 1990.

== Career ==
An overview of his career is as follows; a Brunei Administrative Officer in Menteri Besar Office from 1965 to 1969, an Educational Administrator and Senior Administrator from 1969 to 1971, and the Head of Planning Unit with the Department of Education in 1973. In 1974, he was named Acting Deputy Director of Education, and on 1 January 1975, he was officially appointed to the role. He was appointed Director of Education from 1977 to 1982. From 8 February to 31 December 1982, he was the director-general of the Public Service Department.

He became the Director of Establishment with the Head of State Civil Service from 1982 to 1983, the Director of Diplomatic Services from 1983 to 1984, the Permanent Secretary at the Ministry of Foreign Affairs from 1984 to 1986, the Deputy Minister of Education from 1986 to 2001, Acting Minister of Development in 2001, Minister of Development from 2002 to 2005, Minister of Industry and Primary Resources from 2005 to 2008, Minister of Culture, Youth and Sports from 2008 to 2010, and currently the Representative of Brunei Darussalam to the AICHR since November 2011. An investigation of education-related issues was conducted in Malaysia in 1983 by a group of authorities headed by Dato Ahmad.

=== Minister of Development ===
By bolstering the research and development (R&D) infrastructure and human resource base in science, technology, and engineering in the ASEAN member states, the ASEAN Ministers (including Ahmad) responsible for science and technology, seek to contribute to the realization of these goals. This is done in support of the overall regional goals of enhancing economic integration and building competitiveness. Announcing the creation and operation of the Asean Virtual Institute of Science and Technology (AVIST), the ministerial declaration on 27 November 2004.

Universiti Brunei Darussalam (UBD) organized the international conference Contemporary Issues in Economic Development of Small States, which took place from 5 to 6 January 2005, at UBD's Chancellor's Hall. The event was officiated by Pehin Mohammad Daud, while Pehin Ahmad gave the Keynote Address.

=== Minister of Industry and Primary Resources ===
Government and business organizations should collaborate to change young people's perspectives away from heavily favoring careers in the public sector and toward ones that are entrepreneurial and business-savvy. During the Legislative Council meeting on 5 March 2008, Pehin Ahmad, made the appeal. Out of a total population of 391,000, the minister pointed out that 71,000 people, including those who are paid on a daily basis, are employed by the government in Brunei. He also believed that a number of government organizations and even some private businesses ought to contribute to encouraging locals to start their own businesses.

=== Minister of Culture, Youth and Sports ===
The three countries of Borneo, Brunei, Indonesia, and Malaysia, signed a historic proclamation in February 2007 to show their dedication to ensuring a healthy future for Borneo's highland rainforest. The Heart of Borneo Initiative aims to promote conservation and sustainable development that enhances the welfare of island residents while minimizing deforestation, forest degradation, and the resulting loss of biodiversity and ecosystem services. Ministers Pehin Ahmad, M. S. Kaban, and Dato' Azmi bin Khalid sign the Heart of Borneo Declaration on behalf of the three Bornean governments.

The Islamic Religious Council and the MCYS' Community Development Department provided financial assistance to 21,608 people, or 5.54 percent of Brunei's total population, in 2007. The fund, which has a total annual budget allocation of $22.6 million, is designated for the population considered to be below the relative poverty threshold. At the opening ceremony of the two-day regional seminar with the theme "History in the country's development," co-organized by the Sultan Haji Hassanal Bolkiah Foundation and Brunei History Association (Pesebar), at UBD, Pehin Ahmad made this point.

For us to reap the benefits, we have to start appreciating history... History is the best teacher in life for its major role in determining the greatness of a civilisation, race and nation. We need to accept the fact that we are now in an environment filled with challenges, problems and competitions that must be conquered, managed and handled... The future is impossible to predict. Change is the only thing that is constant.

— Pehin Orang Kaya Setia Pahlawan Dato Seri Setia Dr. Haji Ahmad Haji Jumat, The Brunei Times, 11 January 2009

The Community Development Officer of the Probation and Community Service Unit of the Department of Community Development has been named the Chief Probation Officer for the purposes of that Order by the Minister of Culture, Youth, and Sports in accordance with the authority granted by section 3(1) of the Offenders (Probation and Community Service) Order, 2006, with the approval of His Majesty the Sultan and Yang Di-Pertuan on 25 February 2010.

== Other appointments ==
Pehin Ahmad serves as the Deputy Chairman of Java, the National Committee for Human Resource Development, Chairman of the Brunei Darussalam Technical and Vocational Education (TVET) Council, Executive Chairman of the Nursing College Board of Directors, and Vice President of the ASEAN Schools Sports Council. Member of the Islamic Dawab Center Advisory Board, Ministry of Religious Affairs (KHEU) and Member of the Ministry of Primary Resources and Tourism (MIPR) Council.

Ahmad has additional positions as Chairman of the National Development Planner Board of Directors at the Ministry of Finance, and Chairman of the Committee Endowment Fund at Universiti Brunei Darussalam (UBD). Chairman of the Board of Directors of Jerudong International School (JIS); Vice-Chairman of the 1999 SEA Games; Member of the National Education Council; and Member of the Executive Committee for the Tokoh Agama/Jasawan Agama and Bakti Hijrah 1421 are among the positions held by DataStream Technology (DST).

== Personal life ==
Ahmad is married.

== Titles and honours ==
=== Titles ===
Ahmad was bestowed the Manteri title of Yang Berhormat (The Honourable) Pehin Orang Kaya Setia Pahlawan on 24 April 2004.

=== Honours ===
Ahmad has earned the following honours;

- Order of Setia Negara Brunei First Class (PSNB; 15 July 2002) – Dato Seri Setia
- Order of Seri Paduka Mahkota Brunei First Class (SPMB) – Dato Seri Paduka
- Order of Paduka Seri Laila Jasa Second Class (DSLJ) – Dato Seri Laila Jasa
- Meritorious Service Medal (PJK)
- Long Service Medal (PKL)

Political offices
| Preceded by Mohammad Daud | 4th Minister of Culture, Youth and Sports; 22 August 2008 – 29 May 2010 | Succeeded by Hazair Abdullah |
| Preceded by Abdul Rahman Taib | 2nd Minister of Industry and Primary Resources; 24 May 2005 – 22 August 2008 | Succeeded by Yahya Bakar |
| Preceded by Pengiran Ismail | 3rd Minister of Development; 17 May 2002 – 22 August 2008 | Succeeded by Abdullah Bakar |
| Preceded by Office established | 1st Deputy Minister of Education; 21 October 1986 – 2001 | Succeeded by Suyoi Osman |
