= Abdul Rahman Taib =

Bruneian civil servant and politician (born 1942)

Yang Berhormat Pehin Orang Kaya Seri Lela Dato Seri Setia Abdul Rahman Taib PSNB SLJ PHBS PJK PKL
- عبدالرحمن طائب
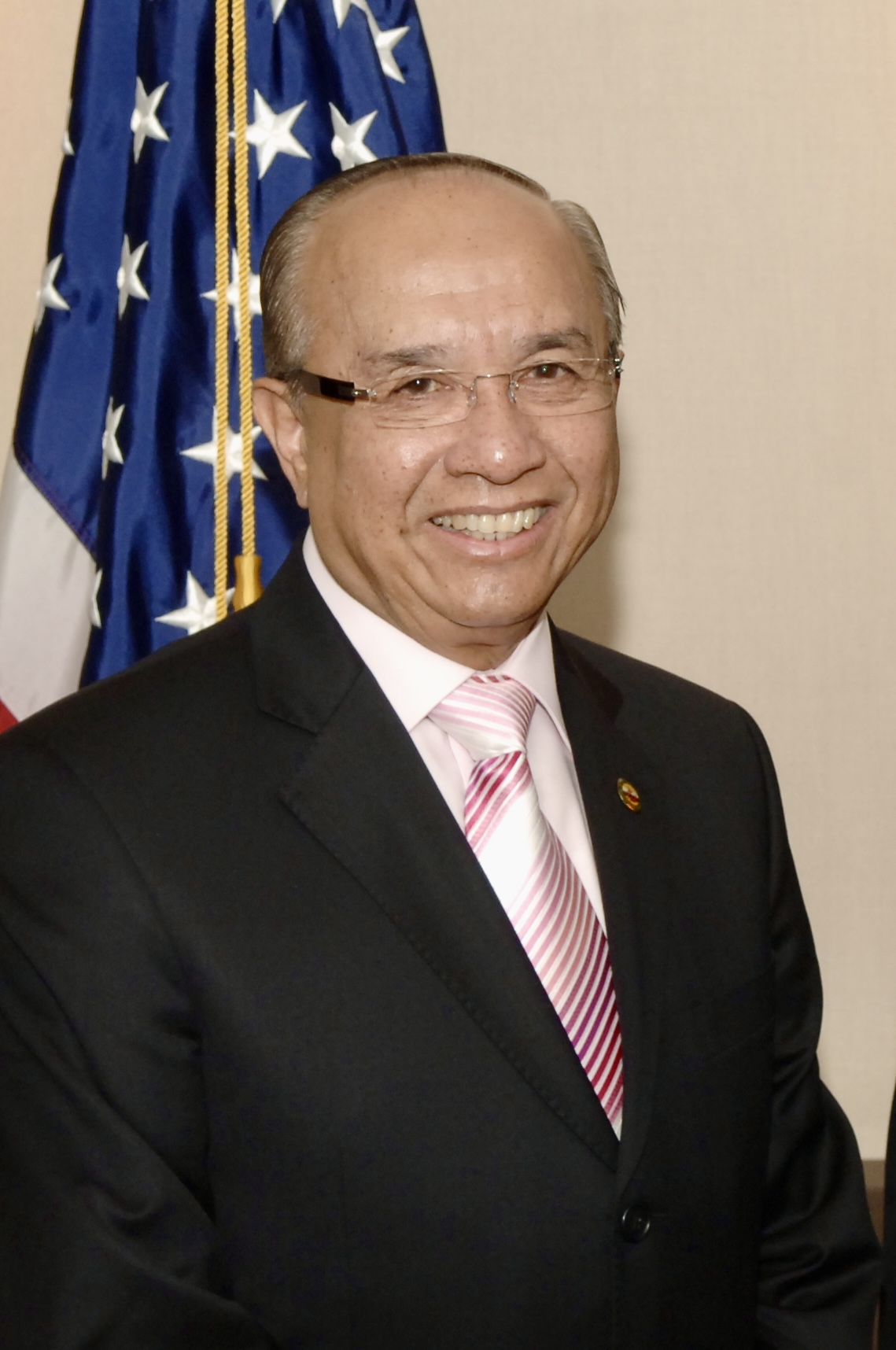
- Abdul Rahman in 2008

8th Speaker of the Legislative Council of Brunei
- Incumbent
- Assumed office 11 February 2015
- Monarch: Hassanal Bolkiah
- Preceded by: Isa Ibrahim

1st Minister of Industry and Primary Resources
- In office 30 November 1988 – 24 May 2005
- Preceded by: Office established
- Succeeded by: Ahmad Jumat

2nd Minister of Education
- In office 24 May 2005 – 29 May 2010
- Deputy: Pengiran Mohammad
- Preceded by: Abdul Aziz Umar
- Succeeded by: Abu Bakar Apong
- In office 20 October 1986 – 30 November 1988
- Deputy: Ahmad Jumat
- Preceded by: Abdul Aziz Umar
- Succeeded by: Abdul Aziz Umar

1st Minister of Development
- In office 1 January 1984 – 20 October 1986
- Preceded by: Office established
- Succeeded by: Pengiran Ismail

6th State Secretary of Brunei
- In office 1 September 1981 – 1 January 1984
- Preceded by: Abdul Aziz Umar
- Succeeded by: Office abolished

Personal details
- Born: 5 December 1942 (age 83) Kuala Belait, Belait, Brunei
- Spouse: Edah Noor
- Parent: Taib Besar (father)
- Education: University of Malaya (BA); University of Oxford
- Occupation: Civil servant; politician

Abdul Rahman bin Mohamed Taib (born 5 December 1942) is a Bruneian aristocrat and politician, currently serving as the speaker of the Legislative Council of Brunei since February 2015. Prior to this, he held key positions as the minister of development, minister of education, and minister of industry and primary resources. His career in the civil service began in 1966, and he held various important roles until Brunei's independence in 1984, including serving as the state secretary of Brunei.

== Early life and education ==
Abdul Rahman was born on 5 December 1942 in Kuala Belait, Brunei, to Taib Besar, who served as the state secretary of Brunei from 1967 to 1969. He completed his early education in Brunei before pursuing higher studies at the University of Malaya, where he earned a Bachelor of Arts (Hons). Furthermore, he undertook advanced management and diplomacy courses at the University of Oxford in the United Kingdom.

== Political career ==
=== Early career ===
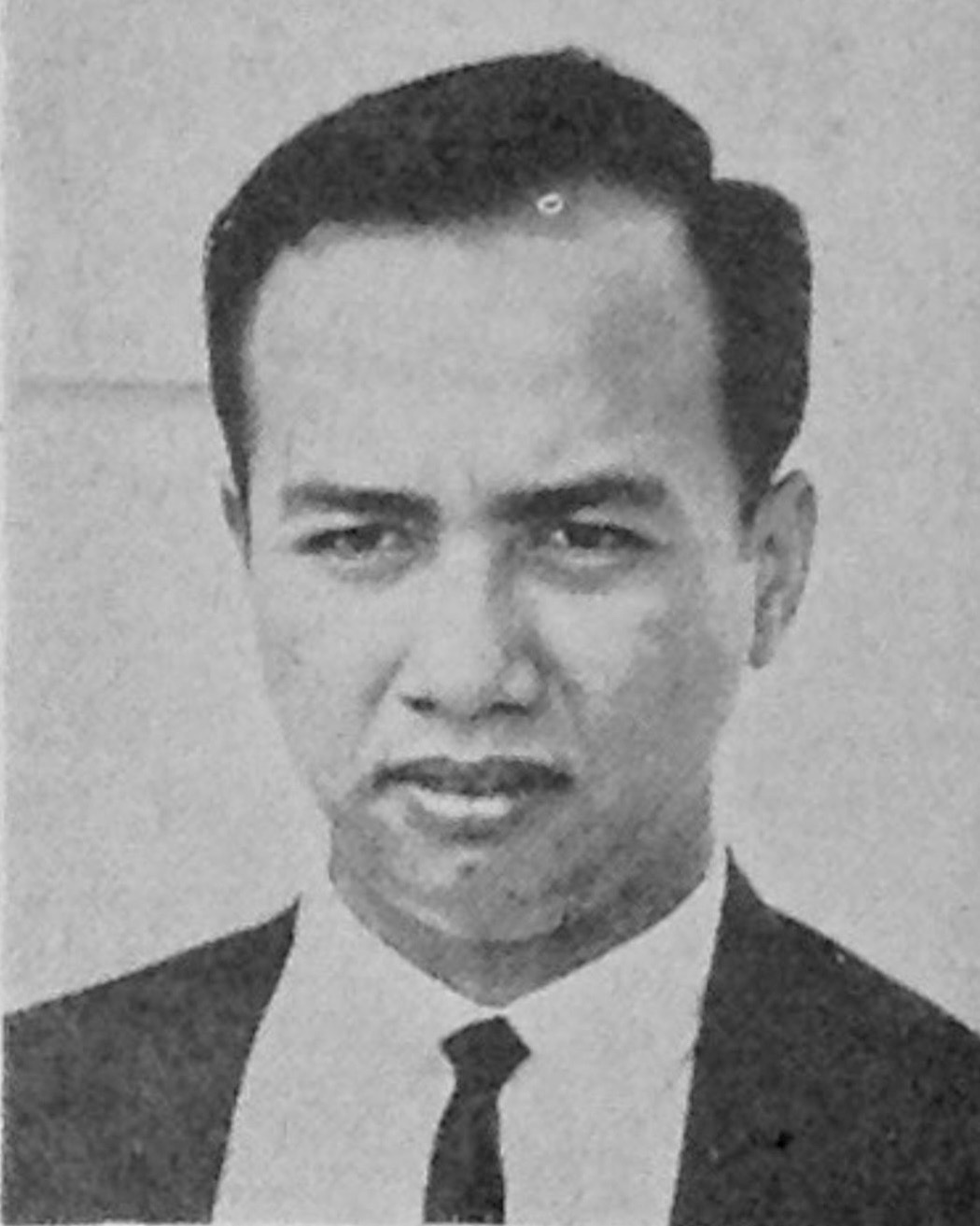
Abdul Rahman, c. 1970

Abdul Rahman began his career in 1966 at the administrative office in the state secretary's office, later serving as senior administrative officer for the sultan's advisor, director of personnel, and head of diplomatic service. He chaired a newly formed education commission in 1970, and the panel released an education commission report in 1972 that included recommendations for the future of the country's educational system. He was appointed the first director-general of the Public Service Department, a role he held from 1 August 1975 to 31 July 1980. From 1 September 1981 to 1 January 1984, Abdul Rahman served as the state secretary of Brunei.

=== Minister of Development ===
Abdul Rahman was appointed Brunei's first minister of development following the country's full independence on 1 January 1984, playing a key role in establishing professional government institutions alongside traditional governance. He attended the 16th meeting of the ASEAN Economic Ministers from 7 to 9 May 1984 in Jakarta, Indonesia.

In 1985, Abdul Rahman inaugurated a joint-venture business conference at the Hassanal Bolkiah National Stadium, emphasising the importance of joint ventures in balancing local participation with international expertise. In December 1985, he launched the nation's 5th National Development Plan (RKN 5) for 1986–1990. The plan proposed the creation of a development bank and monetary authority to support economic growth, with a B$3.73 billion budget allocated across various sectors.

=== Minister of Education (1986–1988) ===
After the death of his father, Sultan Hassanal Bolkiah revealed a new cabinet on 20 October 1986 through Radio Television Brunei. This reshuffle led to the creation of thirteen ministerial positions, with Abdul Rahman appointed as minister of education. Despite the changes, the sultan reaffirmed that government policies would remain consistent. That same year, he was appointed as vice-chancellor of Universiti Brunei Darussalam (UBD) until 1988.

=== Minister of Industry and Primary Resources ===
In order to address concerns about the lack of progress in economic diversification—a major objective of RKN 5—Abdul Rahman was chosen to head the newly created Ministry of Industry and Primary Resources on 30 November 1988. Abdul Rahman participated in the Joint Statement of the Asia Pacific Economic Cooperation Ministerial-Level Meeting, held in Canberra from 6 to 7 November 1989.

From 29 to 31 July 1990, Abdul Rahman attended the APEC Ministerial Meeting in Singapore. In 1993, he emphasised the need for economic diversification to address the labor shortage, particularly among the younger, better-educated population. He noted that many Bruneians were selective about their jobs, often preferring leisure or relying on the extended family structure. Abdul Rahman also participated in the 25th ASEAN Economic Ministers' Meeting in Singapore from 7 to 8 October 1993.

To improve the economic environment, Abdul Rahman organised a muzakarah (consultative meeting) with the private sector in 1995. Economic leaders proposed changes to the government payment system, labour quotas, and work permits, along with clearer policies and faster decision-making processes. Abdul Rahman emphasised the importance of implementing these suggestions to maintain the momentum of subregional economic growth during Brunei's inaugural East ASEAN Growth Area trade fair in November 1995. Additionally, his successful business visit to Sarawak in 1995 resulted in the signing of eight memoranda of understanding (MoU) covering industries such as tourism, agro-industry, and technology transfer.

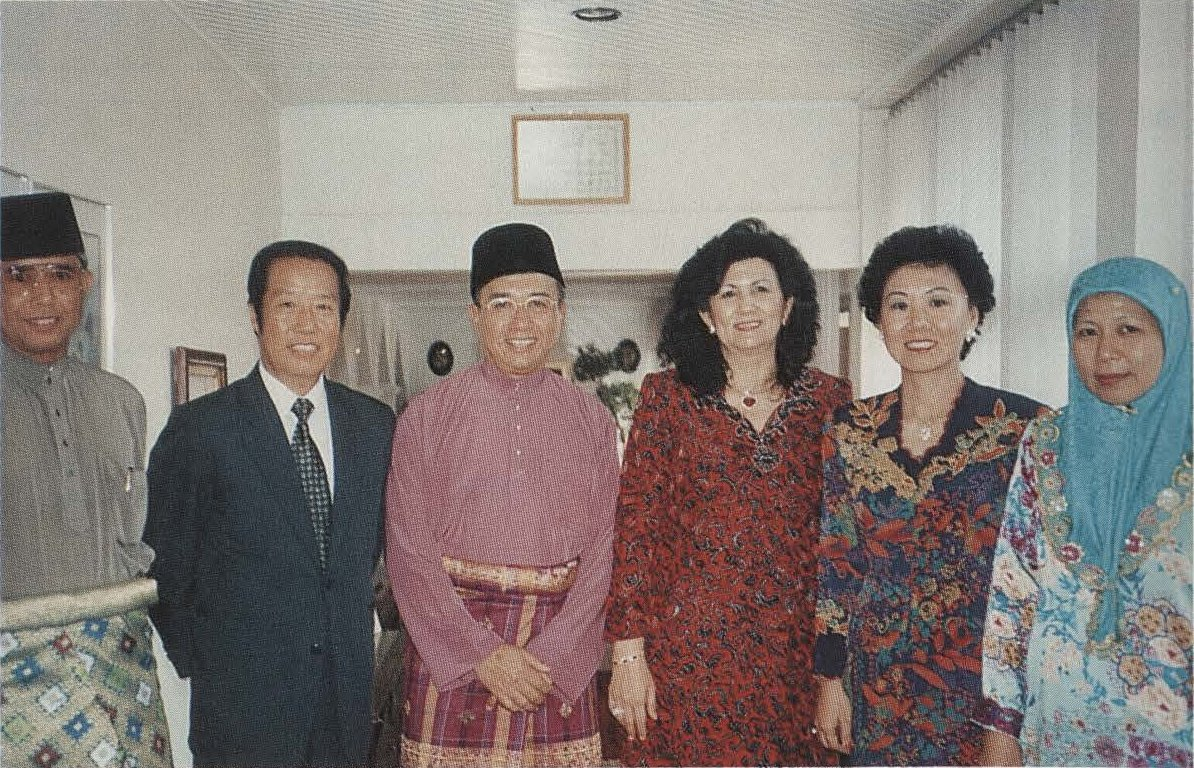
Abdul Rahman (third from left) with a Taiwanese delegation in 1997

Abdul Rahman attended several key meetings in the 1990s, including the Ninth Meeting of the ASEAN Free Trade Area (AFTA) Council in Singapore on 26 April 1996, and the 18th ASEAN Ministers' Meeting on Agriculture and Forestry in Manila on 28 August 1996. He also participated in the 11th AFTA Council Meeting in Subang Jaya, Malaysia, on 15 October 1997, and represented the Brunei government in signing the Protocol to Implement the Initial Package of Commitments under the ASEAN Framework Agreement on Services in Kuala Lumpur on 15 December 1997.

Despite the difficulties caused by the Asian economic crisis, Abdul Rahman emphasised in September 1998 the importance of luring small and medium-sized businesses to the nation and urged bigger companies, like QAF Holdings, to be more active in this endeavour. As the deputy chairman of the Ministerial Economic Council, he acknowledged Brunei's economic challenges brought on by the financial crisis and emphasised the necessity of reexamining underutilised sectors while making sure the ongoing privatisation of Muara Port proceeded, with the Port of Singapore Authority showing interest.

As part of the BIMP-EAGA's efforts to establish Brunei as a Service Hub for Trade and Tourism, Abdul Rahman emphasised the importance of balancing economic growth from tourism with the preservation of Brunei's cultural, social, and environmental values in 1999. On 31 March 2000, Abdul Rahman chaired the APEC Ministerial Meeting at the APEC Seoul Forum. On 3 December 2002, Abdul Rahman stated that Brunei and Thailand have a long history of friendly relations and strong collaboration in business, education, investment, and defence during a reception held to celebrate the 75th birthday of King Bhumibol Adulyadej of Thailand.

=== Minister of Education (2005–2010) ===
Abdul Rahman was appointed as the minister of education on 24 May 2005 following a cabinet reshuffle and was sworn in on 30 May 2005. During his tenure, he played a key role in the development and implementation of the 2007–2011 Ministry of Education (MoE) Strategic Plan. One of his most significant contributions was the introduction of the nation's 21st Century Education System (SPN21), which marked a milestone in Brunei's education system.

Abdul Rahman also led the establishment of the second university in the country, Sultan Sharif Ali Islamic University, on 1 January 2007. He played a pivotal role in reshaping tertiary education in Brunei, leading to the creation of the Permanent Secretary (Tertiary Education) and the Tertiary Education Division at the MoE in 2008. That same year, he presented Brunei's educational reforms, including a mandatory nine-year education plan and a 12-year education program for all Bruneians and permanent residents. He emphasised the importance of multiple pathways to higher education, the design of SPN21, and a holistic educational approach focused on developing students' potential, including character building.

In August 2009, Abdul Rahman was chosen as chairman of the Melayu Islam Beraja (MIB) Supreme Council. Under his leadership, the Sultan Hassanal Bolkiah Institute of Education was upgraded to a graduate school in early 2009, and he played a key role in transforming the Pengiran Anak Puteri Rashidah Sa'adatul Bolkiah Nursing College into the Pengiran Anak Puteri Rashidah Sa'adatul Bolkiah Institute of Health Sciences at the Medical Institute, UBD, on 19 May 2010. He was also involved in updating the Teachers Service Scheme. His tenure as minister ended after a cabinet reshuffle on 29 May 2010.

=== Speaker of the Legislative Council ===
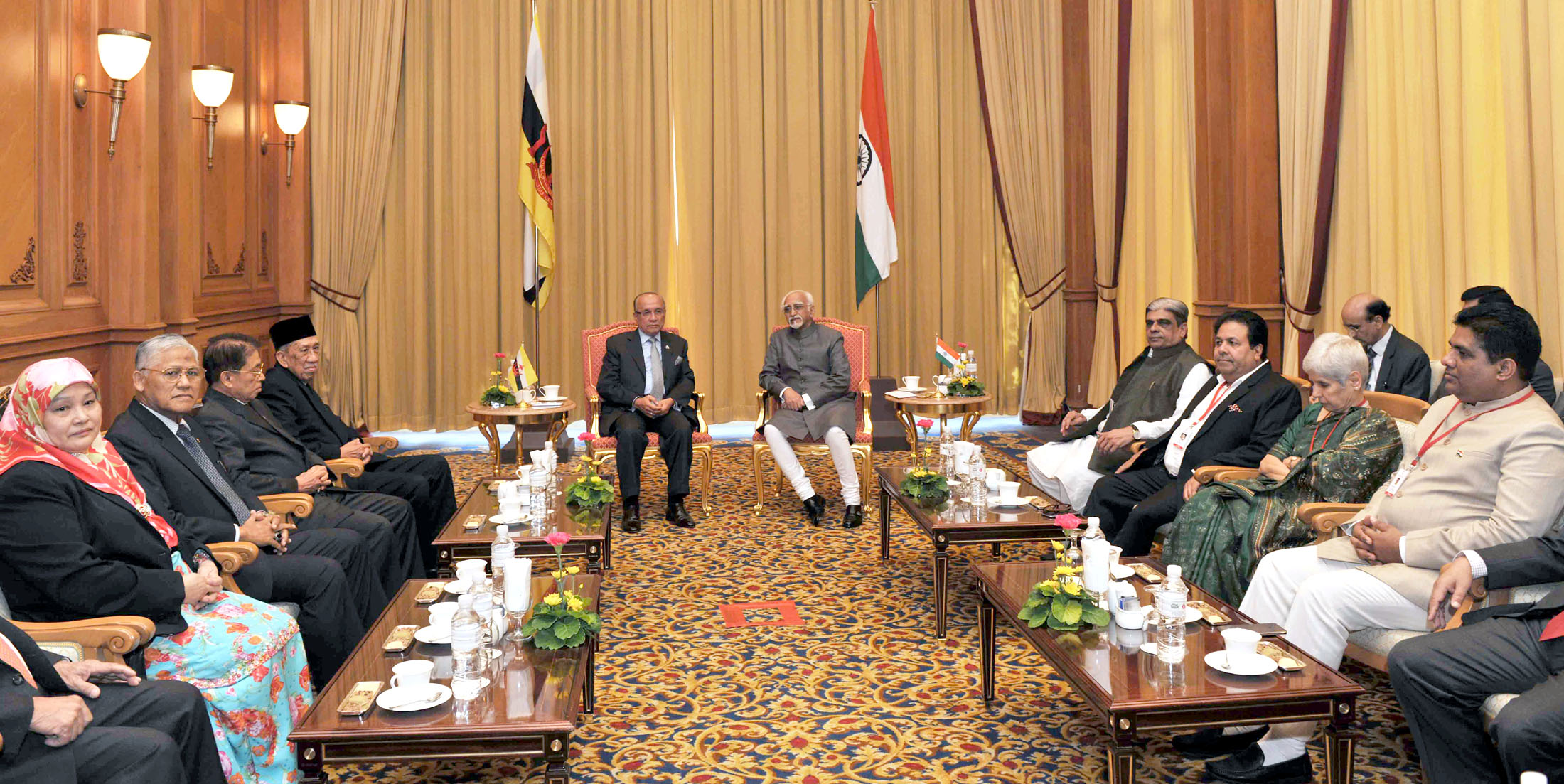
Meeting between Abdul Rahman and Mohammad Hamid Ansari in 2016

On 10 February 2015, Abdul Rahman was appointed as the speaker of the Legislative Council by Sultan Hassanal Bolkiah. This appointment followed the retirement of the previous speaker, Isa Ibrahim. Abdul Rahman's appointment was effective from 11 February 2015.

Abdul Rahman signed a MoU with the Federation Council of Russia on 19 February 2019, aimed at enhancing communication between the parliaments of both nations. He emphasised that the agreement took into account the interests of both the Russian and Bruneian people.

Abdul Rahman, during the first plenary session of the 43rd ASEAN Inter-Parliamentary Assembly (AIPA), highlighted the importance of ASEAN's unity and centrality in overcoming future challenges. He also emphasised the need for focused attention on the unpredictable impacts of COVID-19 on the economy, health, and education.

== Personal life ==
Abdul Rahman has three daughters with his wife, Datin Hajah Edah binti Haji Mohd Noor. He has a passion for modern literature and art, particularly enjoying best-selling books. An avid sportsman, he especially enjoys playing golf.

== Titles, styles and honours ==
=== Titles and styles ===
On 3 December 1981, Abdul Rahman was honoured by Sultan Hassanal Bolkiah with the manteri title of Pehin Orang Kaya Setia Pahlawan, bearing the style Yang Dimuliakan. This title was later upgraded to Pehin Orang Kaya Lela on 1 April 2004.

=== Awards ===
- Sultan Haji Omar 'Ali Saifuddien Education Award (25 September 2013)
- AIPA Distinguished Service Award (24 November 2022)

=== Honours ===
Abdul Rahman has been bestowed the following state and academic honours:

National

- Order of Setia Negara Brunei First Class (PSNB) – Dato Seri Setia
- Order of Paduka Seri Laila Jasa Third Class (SLJ; 15 July 1970)
- Sultan Hassanal Bolkiah Medal (PHBS)
- Meritorious Service Medal (PJK)
- Long Service Medal (PKL)
- Proclamation of Independence Medal (10 March 1997)
- Coronation Medal (1 August 1968)
- Sultan of Brunei Golden Jubilee Medal (5 October 2017)
- Sultan of Brunei Silver Jubilee Medal (5 October 1992)
- National Day Silver Jubilee Medal (23 February 2009)
- Honorary Doctor of Letters from UBD (1996)

Foreign

- Singapore:
  - Member President Advancement Advisory Council by National University of Singapore (2011)
- United Kingdom:
  - Honorary Doctor of Laws from University of Hull (1991)
  - Honorary Fellowship of the University of Wales Cardiff (2010)

Political offices
Preceded by Isa Ibrahim	8th Speaker of the Legislative Council of Brunei; 11 February 2015 – present	Succeeded by Incumbent
Preceded by Office established	1st Minister of Industry and Primary Resources; 30 November 1988 – 24 May 2005	Succeeded by Ahmad Jumat
Preceded by Abdul Aziz Umar; Abdul Aziz Umar	2nd Minister of Education; 24 May 2005 – 29 May 2010; 20 October 1986 – 30 November 1988	Succeeded by Abu Bakar Apong; Abdul Aziz Umar
Preceded by Office established	1st Minister of Development; 1 January 1984 – 20 October 1986	Succeeded by Pengiran Ismail
Preceded by Abdul Aziz Umar	6th State Secretary of Brunei; 1 September 1981 – 1 January 1984	Succeeded by Office abolished
Academic offices
Preceded by Abdul Aziz Umar	Vice-Chancellor of Universiti Brunei Darussalam; 1986–1988	Succeeded by Abdul Aziz Umar
