= Mohammad bin Daud =

Bruneian military office (born 1943)

Yang Dimuliakan Pehin Orang Kaya Seri Dewa Major General (Retired) Dato Seri Pahlawan Mohammad bin Daud PSPNB PGAT DSNB DSLJ DPMB PSM PHBS PBLI
- محمد بن داود
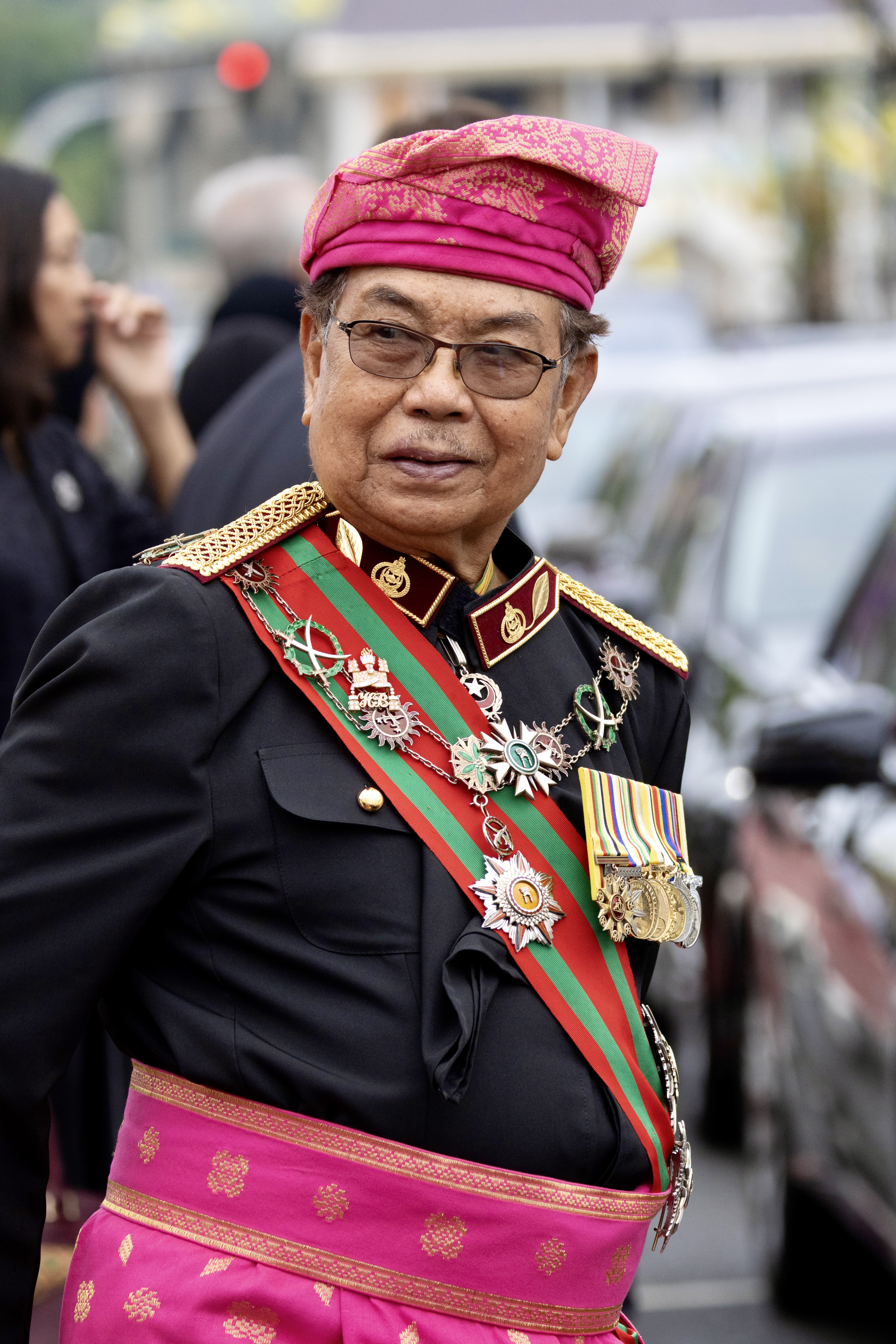
- Mohammad in 2024

2nd Minister of Energy at the Prime Minister's Office
- In office 22 August 2008 – 29 May 2010
- Monarch: Hassanal Bolkiah
- Preceded by: Yahya Bakar
- Succeeded by: Yasmin Umar

3rd Minister of Culture, Youth and Sports
- In office 24 May 2005 – 22 August 2008
- Deputy: Yakub Abu Bakar
- Preceded by: Hussain Yusof
- Succeeded by: Ahmad Jumat

Chairman of Brunei Economic Development Board
- In office 2004–2005
- Preceded by: Yusoff Abdul Hamid
- Succeeded by: Timothy Ong (Acting)

Permanent Representative of Brunei to the United Nations
- In office 14 February 1996 – April 1997
- Preceded by: Pengiran Abdul Momin
- Succeeded by: Pengiran Maidin

Ambassador of Brunei to Egypt
- In office September 1993 – May 1995
- Preceded by: Malai Ahmad Murad
- Succeeded by: Sulaiman Damit

1st Commander of the Royal Brunei Armed Forces
- In office 30 December 1985 – 9 August 1990
- Deputy: Sulaiman Damit
- Preceded by: Office established
- Succeeded by: Sulaiman Damit

Personal details
- Born: 1 May 1943 (age 83) Brunei
- Spouse: Saidah Said
- Education: Federation Military College; Staff College, Camberley; Royal College of Defence Studies
- Profession: Diplomat; military officer; politician

Military service
- Branch/service: Royal Brunei Land Force
- Years of service: 1962–1991
- Rank: Major General
- Commands: Training Wing Depot; Royal Brunei Armed Forces

Mohammad bin Haji Daud (born 1 May 1943) is a Bruneian aristocrat, diplomat, politician, and military officer who served as the first commander of the Royal Brunei Armed Forces (RBAF) from 1985 to 1990. He later became Brunei's permanent representative to the United Nations (UN) from 1996 to 1997, minister of culture, youth and sports from 2005 to 2008, and minister of energy at the Prime Minister's Office (PMO) from 2008 to 2010.

== Early life and education ==
Mohammad bin Haji Daud was born in Brunei on 1 May 1943. In early December 1960, a radio station and the local newspaper announced a two-year officer cadet training opportunity at the Federation Military College (FMC) in Malaya. By mid-December, 17 cadets who had applied for the programme underwent a selection process at the Sultan Omar Ali Saifuddien College gymnasium in Tasek Lama, where they were interviewed by a panel of four officers from the Malayan armed forces. Only three out of the seven candidates were selected: Sulaiman Damit, Mohammad, and Awangku Ibnu Basit, who became known as the "three musketeers". On 24 December 1960, they took their oaths before departing Brunei the next day through Singapore.

During their first year as junior cadets, they underwent basic military training, which included parade drills, weapons handling, tactics, administration, and the military code of justice. Alongside their military instruction, they also received academic education to prepare for the Higher School Certificate, equivalent to the GCE 'A' Level. Their second year of senior cadet training was significantly more challenging. By 4 November 1961, as part of the Malayan armed forces, the cadets were temporarily assigned to a battalion in Mentakab, Pahang, and Pengkalan Chepa, Kelantan, where they gained practical experience and further honed their skills.

== Military career ==
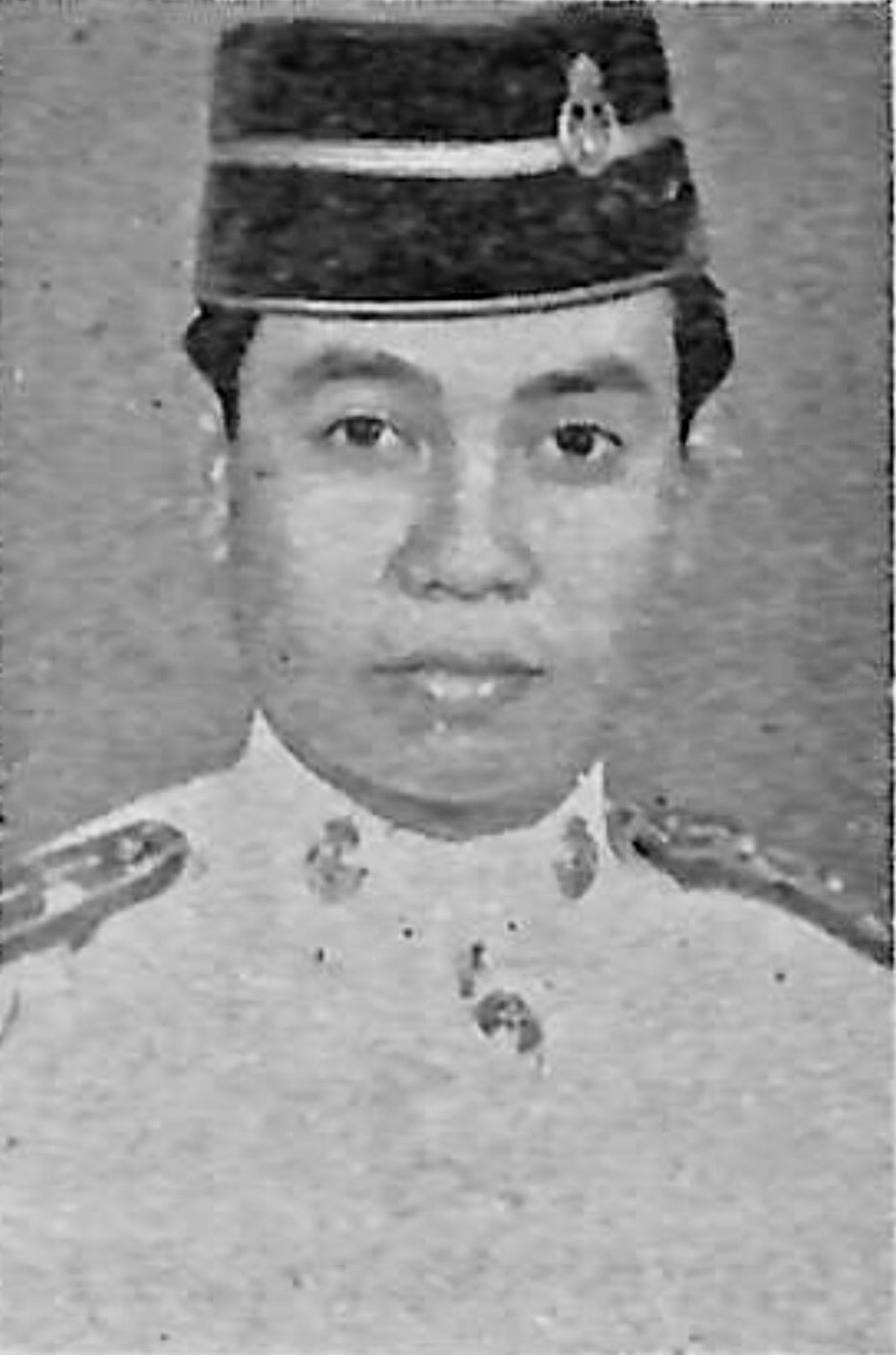
Mohammad in the Brunei Malay Regiment, c. 1969

On 8 December 1962, Mohammad was among the three musketeers to be commissioned as a second lieutenant by Sultan Omar Ali Saifuddien III, in a ceremony presided over by the Yang di-Pertuan Agong of Malaya, Putra of Perlis. This marked the official start of his military career. Having completed his officer cadet training, he had earned the rank of second lieutenant. During his time at the FMC, Mohammad underwent training in infantry tactics, jungle warfare, public order management, and ceremonial duties, all of which equipped him for a future leadership role in the armed forces.

During the fifth anniversary of the Brunei Malay Regiment in 1966, local officers began taking on roles once held by British officers. Captain Mohammad was appointed adjutant, succeeding Captain R. J. L. Sherrin, marking a key step in the localisation of leadership within the regiment. In 1968, he, alongside the other "three musketeers," underwent advanced small weapons and tactics training at the British Army School of Infantry in Warminster. This was followed by attachments to three British battalions in Germany and a British infantry brigade. On 1 July 1969, he was promoted to major, alongside Captain H. N. Houghton, after completing this training.

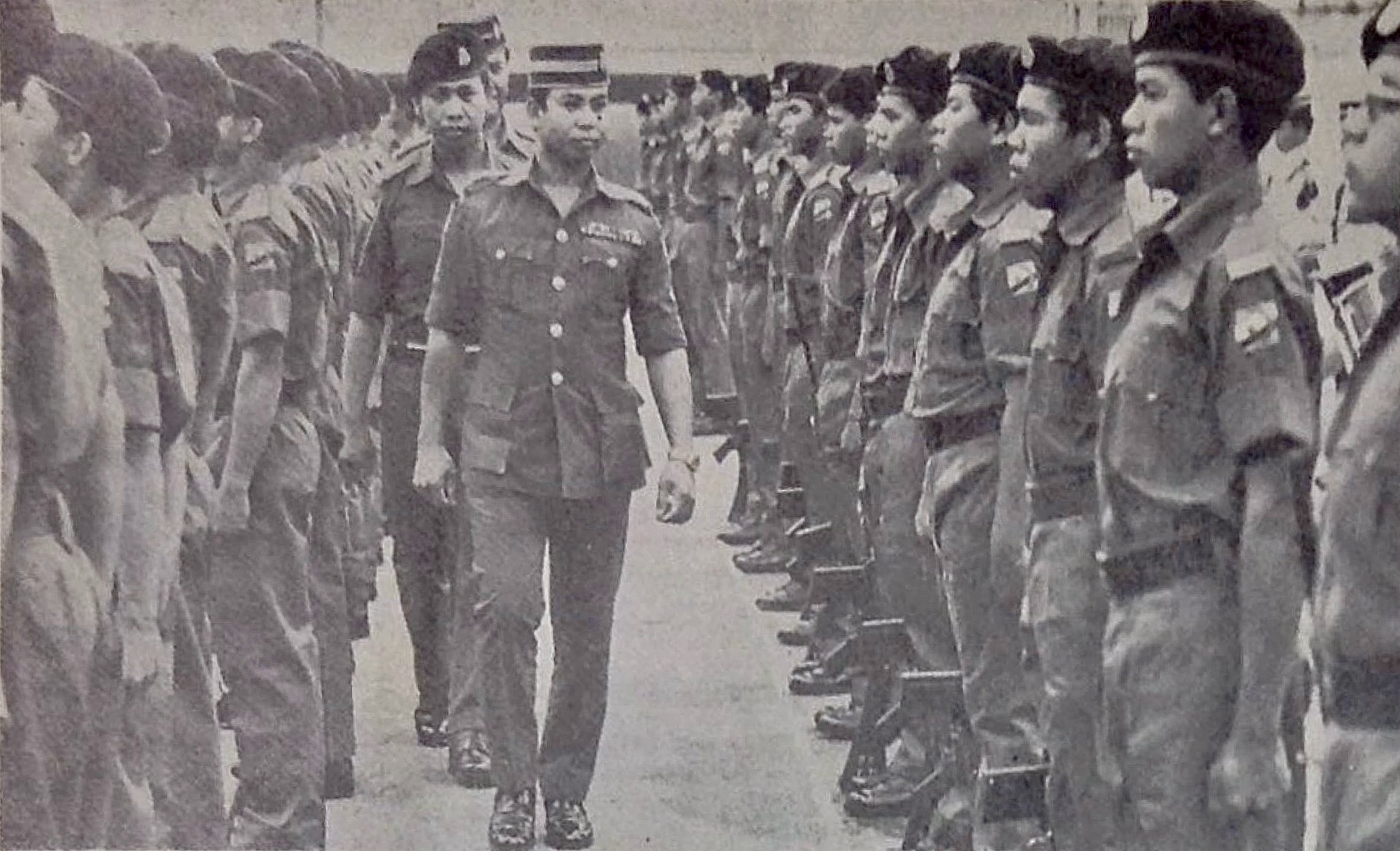
Mohammad reviewing the guard of honour at Bolkiah Camp in 1973

In 1970, Major Mohammad returned to the role of adjutant, further cementing his leadership within the regiment. In 1971, he attended the British Army Staff College in Camberley, continuing his professional development. When Queen Elizabeth II visited Brunei in 1972, he was appointed as her aide-de-camp. Mohammad was the first Brunei officer to be given the responsibilities of commanding officer at the training institute from June 1973 to June 1974, and was later reappointed in July 1974, promoted to lieutenant colonel in April 1975. In 1976, he was appointed as an ex-officio member of the Legislative Council of Brunei, until 1983.

After independence, Mohammad announced the renaming of the Royal Brunei Malay Regiment to the RBAF, highlighting how ASEAN membership would enhance military cooperation between Brunei and its neighbours. In 1983, Singapore established a jungle training centre near Temburong, and Brunei and Singapore conducted joint battalion exercises. Brunei's naval fleet also held joint exercises with Malaysia and Singapore. The RBAF arsenal includes field artillery, Rapier surface-to-air missiles, Bell 212 helicopters, fast patrol craft, and FV101 Scorpion tanks. Under an agreement with Britain, Brunei retained a Gurkha Battalion and British personnel in 1983, with post-independence arrangements largely unchanged.

After spending a year at the Royal College of Defence Studies in London in 1985, Brigadier General Mohammad was appointed as the first local commander of the RBAF on 31 December 1985. This marked a significant shift, as Bruneians began assuming command positions that had previously been held by British officers. Following the death of Omar Ali in September 1986, Sultan Hassanal Bolkiah assumed the defence portfolio and restructured the RBAF, promoting Mohammad to the rank of major general and appointing him as Chief of the Armed Forces Staff. He attended the Pacific Armies Management Seminars and oversaw Brunei's delegation to these events in Honolulu, Seoul, and Bangkok during the 1980s.

Under Mohammad's leadership, the limited local population posed a challenge to the RBAF's personnel needs. In response, the Royal Brunei Reserve Regiment was established in 1987, significantly boosting the force's manpower. While the reservists were not tested in combat, they actively participated in military drills and supported welfare and spiritual initiatives. By 1986, the RBAF employed 17% of Brunei's workforce. Mohammad served as commander until 10 August 1990 and retired from the military in May 1991.

== Diplomatic career ==
Mohammad represented Brunei Darussalam at ASEAN Inter-Parliamentary Organization conferences in Singapore in 1982, Bangkok in 1991, and Jakarta in 1992. In 1991, he was appointed to Brunei's Privy Council, the highest advisory body to the government. Later that year, on 14 October, he officially launched the telephone service to Kampong Tanah Jambu, Kampong Sungai Buloh, and Kampong Salambigar, with the completion of the cable network project at the Telekom Salar office in Muara. Between September 1993 and May 1995, he served as Brunei's ambassador to Egypt while concurrently holding the role of ambassador to Morocco. On 14 February 1996, Mohammad presented his credentials as Brunei's permanent representative to the UN to Secretary-General Boutros Boutros-Ghali.

== Political career ==
From 2004 to 2005, Mohammad served as chairman of the Brunei Economic Development Board (BEDB). Under his direction, BEDB prioritised job creation, economic diversification, and skill development for the local labor force. In order to leverage Brunei's strategic location and the expanding worldwide container shipping sector, BEDB re-engaged Halcrow Group to help market and promote Pulau Muara Besar as a globally competitive port.

In the 2005 Bruneian cabinet reshuffle on 24 May, Mohammad was appointed minister of culture, youth and sports. On 22 June 2005, he launched the Projek Memeduli Warga Emas, focusing on the welfare of less fortunate senior citizens and emphasising the role of volunteers, the community, and family in addressing their needs. From 3 to 4 August 2005, the ASEAN Ministers Responsible for Culture and Arts (AMCA) and AMCA Plus Three met in Bangkok, with Muhammad attending the AMCA conference.

On 12 April 2006, Mohammad received a donation from Royal Brunei Airlines for the Pakistan Earthquake Humanitarian Fund at the ministry's office. On 9 August, he welcomed a delegation from Northern Australia, where they briefed him on the Arafura Games and invited Brunei's athletes to participate in the 2007 event. On 22 November, he officiated the foundation-laying ceremony for Sengkurong Library, which was set to open the following year. Later, on 24 December, Mohammad opened the National Scout Camp in Sungai Liang, celebrating the Asia-Pacific Scout Movement's 50th anniversary, praising the Brunei Darussalam Scouts Association's efforts and presenting honorary awards to contributors.

On 13 February 2007, Mohammad attended the opening of the B$24 million Muara jetty, a key infrastructure project set to support Brunei Shell Petroleum's offshore operations for the next three decades. The jetty features large storage tanks for drilling, which are managed safely by local engineers, with local graduates trained in various engineering disciplines. He was subsequently reappointed as the minister of energy at the PMO on 22 August 2008.

Mohammad underscored the pivotal role of media in spreading ASEAN messages at the 10th ASEAN Ministerial Conference on Information, emphasising ASEAN Digital Broadcasting and ASEAN Television News as essential platforms. He highlighted the importance of leveraging mobile phones and new media to engage younger audiences and advocated for collaboration with telecom companies to distribute ASEAN-related content. On 29 December 2009, Mohammad launched The Report: Brunei Darussalam 2009 at the Empire Hotel and Country Club. However, following a cabinet reshuffle on 29 May 2010, Mohammad was succeeded by Ahmad Jumat.

== Later life ==
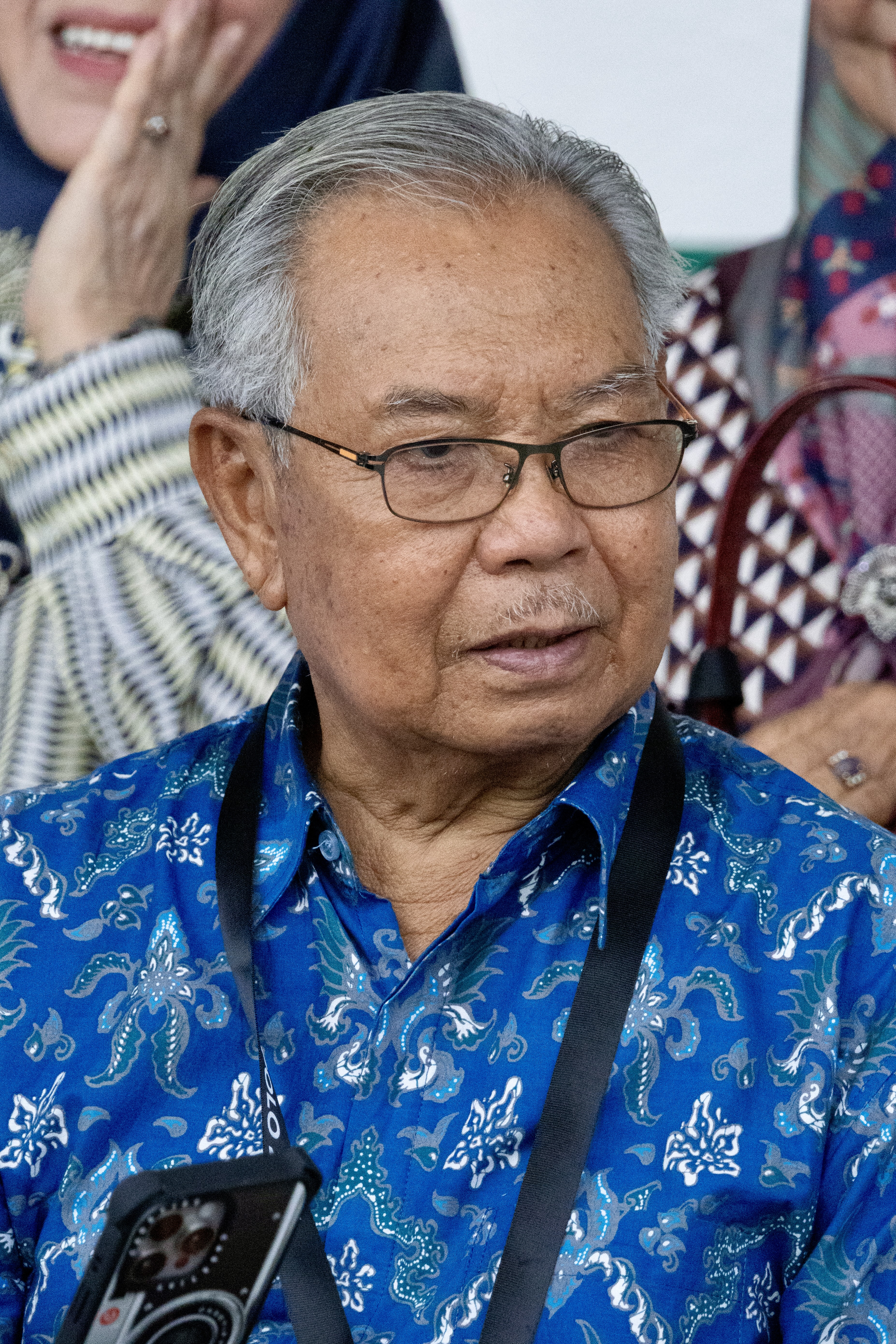
Mohammad at a charity event in Jerudong, 2024

After his ministerial career, Mohammad continued to contribute to various sectors and communities. As early as 2015, he became the co-patron of the Kampong Tanah Jambu Mosque. He also took on the role of chairman of the Takaful Brunei board of directors. Additionally, Mohammad has served as an advisor to the Brunei Darussalam Former Soldiers Association.

In his later years, Mohammad continued to play a prominent role in various ceremonial events. On 10 October 2018, he presided over the transfer of a Kia KM450 military vehicle to the RBAF, with senior representatives from the Ministry of Defence, RBAF, and Goh Hock Kee Motors present at the ceremony. Additionally, on 10 August 2020, Mohammad, alongside Pengiran Ibnu Basit, officiated the launch of the upgraded Kowira Minimart at Berakas Garrison, marking another milestone in his ongoing contributions to his community and country.

According to Mohammad in a 2021 interview, the National Service Programme is essential in assisting young people in developing their discipline, especially those who are unemployed. He emphasised that in addition to academic credentials and physical training, the three-month program instills military discipline. Participants who work in front-line roles exhibit the beneficial traits that the program has shaped, according to him. Mohammad and Pengiran Ibnu Basit attended the FMC Intake 5 60th anniversary reunion in Kuala Lumpur, where they met with other veterans on 21 October 2022.

== Personal life ==
Mohammad is married to Datin Hajah Saidah binti Haji Mohd Said, and they have four children.

== Titles, styles and honours ==
=== Titles and styles ===
Mohammad was honoured by Sultan Hassanal Bolkiah with the manteri title of Pehin Orang Kaya Seri Dewa, bearing the style Yang Dimuliakan.

=== Honours ===
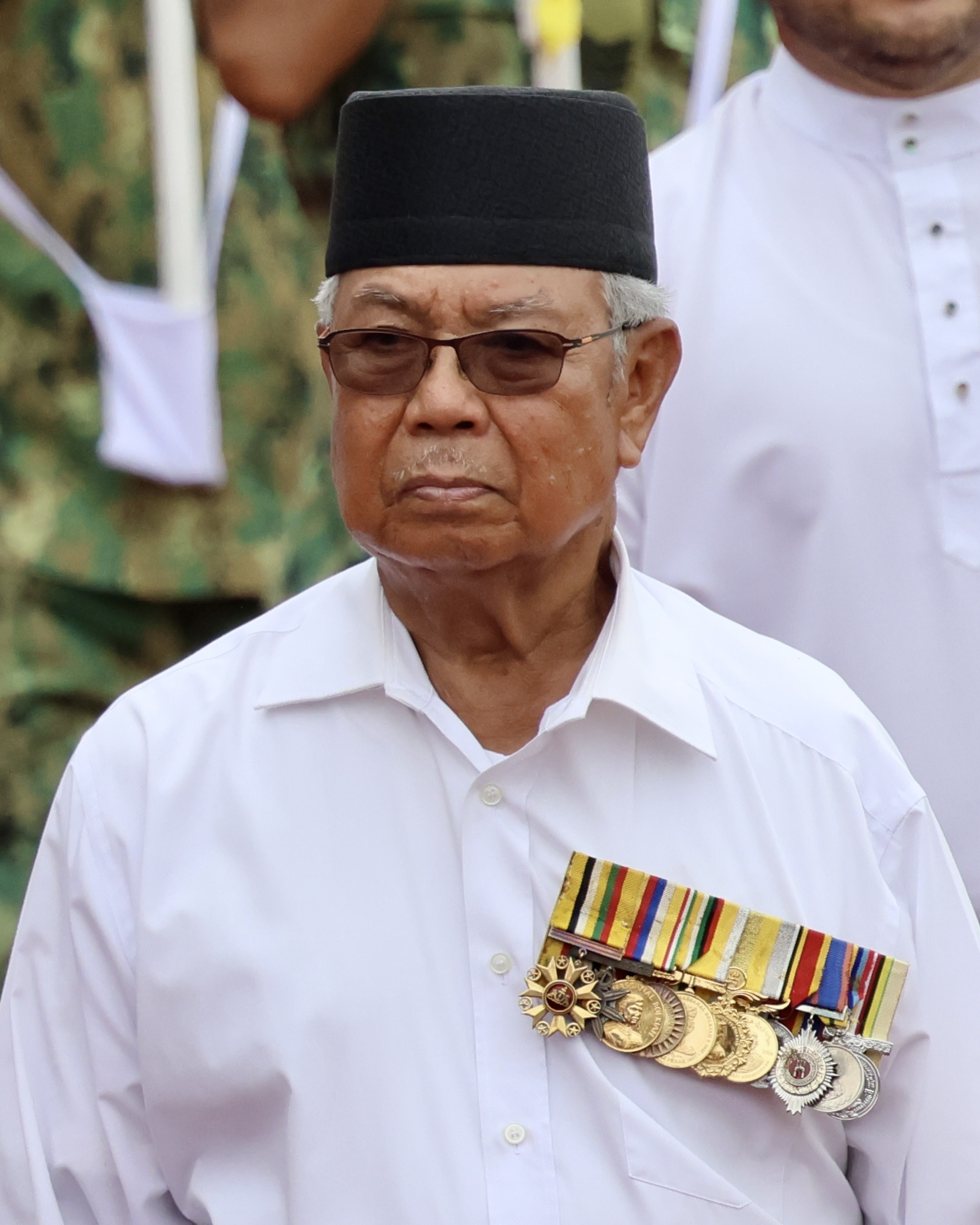
Mohammad wearing his state honours at the 2024 National Day celebration

Mohammad has been bestowed the following honours:

National

- Order of Pahlawan Negara Brunei First Class (PSPNB; 10 February 1976) – Dato Seri Pahlawan
- Order of Pahlawan Negara Brunei Fourth Class (PJB; 21 December 1963)
- Order of Paduka Seri Laila Jasa Second Class (DSLJ) – Dato Seri Laila Jasa
- Order of Setia Negara Brunei Second Class (DSNB) – Dato Setia
- Order of Seri Paduka Mahkota Brunei Second Class (DPMB; 27 November 1971) – Dato Paduka
- Sultan Hassanal Bolkiah Medal (PHBS; 1968)
- Pingat Bakti Laila Ikhlas (PBLI; 2 June 1976)
- Silver Jubilee Medal (5 October 1992)
- Royal Brunei Armed Forces Silver Jubilee Medal (31 May 1986)
- Royal Brunei Armed Forces Diamond Jubilee Medal (31 May 2021)
- Proclamation of Independence Medal (1997)
- General Service Medal (Armed Forces)
- Long Service Medal and Good Conduct (PKLPB)
- Inauguration Medal (1965)

Foreign

- Indonesia :
  - Grand Meritorious Military Order Star, 1st Class (February 1988)
- Malaysia :
  - Honorary Commander of the Order of Loyalty to the Crown of Malaysia (PSM; 1989)
  - Courageous Commander of The Most Gallant Order of Military Service (PGAT; 1987)
- Singapore :
  - Darjah Utama Bakti Cemerlang (Tentera) (DUBC; 29 September 1992)
- South Korea :
  - Order of National Security Merit, Tong-il Medal
- Thailand :
  - Knight Grand Cross of the Order of the Crown of Thailand (PM (GCCT))

=== Things named after him ===
- Jalan Mohammad, a road in Tutong Camp

Diplomatic posts
Preceded by Pengiran Abdul Momin	Permanent Representative of Brunei to the United Nations; 14 February 1996 – April 1997	Succeeded by Pengiran Maidin
Political offices
Preceded by Yahya Bakar	2nd Minister of Energy; 22 August 2008 – 29 May 2010	Succeeded by Yasmin Umar
Preceded by Hussain Yusof	4th Minister of Culture, Youth and Sports; 24 May 2005 – 22 August 2008	Succeeded by Ahmad Jumat
Business positions
Preceded by Yusoff Abdul Hamid	Chairman of Brunei Economic Development Board; 2004–2005	Succeeded by Timothy Ong (Acting)
Military offices
Preceded by Office established	1st Commander of the Royal Brunei Armed Forces; 30 December 1985 – 9 August 1990	Succeeded by Sulaiman Damit
Preceded by Office established	1st Commander of the Training Institute; June 1973 – April 1975	Succeeded by Ariffin Abdul Wahab
