= Pengiran Ismail =

Bruneian architect and politician

Yang Amat Mulia Pengiran Indera Wijaya Pengiran Ismail PSNB SPMB DSLJ PJK PKL
- ڤڠيرن اسماعيل
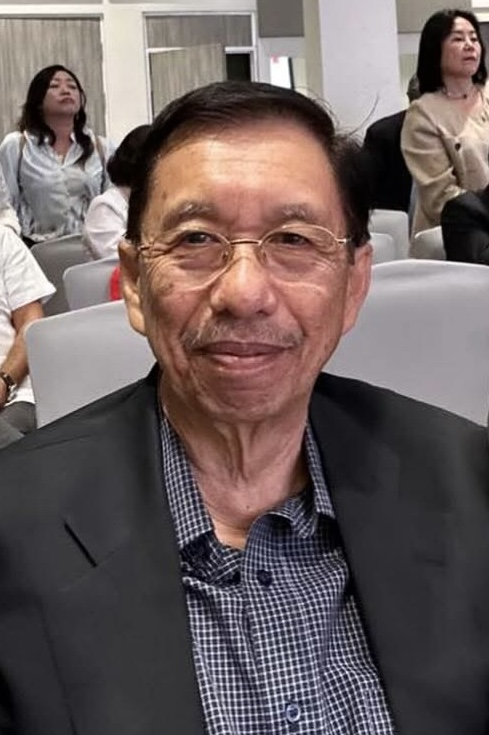
- Pengiran Ismail in 2024

2nd Minister of Development
- In office 20 October 1986 – 28 May 2001
- Monarch: Hassanal Bolkiah
- Preceded by: Abdul Rahman Taib
- Succeeded by: Ahmad Jumat

Personal details
- Born: Awangku Ismail bin Pengiran Damit Brunei
- Education: Sultan Omar Ali Saifuddien College
- Occupation: Architect; politician

Criminal details
- Criminal information
- Status: Released
- Conviction: Corruption
- Penalty: 7 years of imprisonment

Pengiran Ismail bin Pengiran Damit is a Bruneian engineer and noble politician, known for supervising as JKR director, the Istana Nurul Iman. He served as the minister of development from 1986 until his dismissal in 2001. Later, he became embroiled in a corruption trial, where he was found guilty of 11 counts of corruption and sentenced to seven years in prison.

== Education ==
In 1966, Awangku Ismail studied at Sultan Omar Ali Saifuddien College before being awarded a government scholarship to continue his education in the UK.

== Political career ==
=== Early career ===
Pengiran Ismail has served as the Istana Project Supervisor (IPS) since the late 1970s under the directive of Sultan Hassanal Bolkiah. In this role, he oversaw the Public Works Department, the Housing Development Department, and the IPS office, taking ultimate responsibility for planning, contracting, and executing Brunei's housing and public works projects. As IPS, he managed government initiatives, including projects commissioned by the royal family and those financed outside the annual budget. While some projects were classified as IPS initiatives, they were ultimately funded through government contracts. Throughout his tenure, Ismail exercised significant power and influence in these capacities.

Pengiran Ismail, a doctor in engineering, was the JKR director when the Istana Nurul Iman, Brunei's official royal residence was under construction. The palace was designed by Filipino architect Leandro Locsin. Constructed between 1980 and 1984, the palace is situated atop Bukit Lumadin, spanning approximately 120 hectares (300 acres) along Jalan Tutong in Bandar Seri Begawan.

=== Minister of Development ===
On 20 October 1986, following the passing of his father, Sultan Hassanal Bolkiah announced a reshuffled and expanded cabinet via Radio Television Brunei to ensure the smooth operation of his government. This reshuffle saw the creation of thirteen ministerial positions, with Pengiran Ismail appointed as the new minister of development, succeeding Abdul Rahman Taib. Despite the changes, the sultan emphasised that government policies would remain unchanged.

Pengiran Ismail participated in several key ASEAN meetings during the late 1980s and early 1990s. He attended the Eighth Meeting of the ASEAN Economic Ministers on Energy Cooperation in Kuala Lumpur, Malaysia, from 22 to 23 June 1989. Subsequently, he traveled to Subang Jaya, Malaysia, from 18 to 19 June 1990, to attend the Fourth ASEAN Ministerial Meeting on the Environment. Later that year, from 15 to 16 November 1990, he visited Manila, Philippines, to take part in the Ninth ASEAN Ministerial Meeting on Energy Cooperation.

Pengiran Ismail highlighted the importance of environmental impact evaluations for development projects in 1991, stressing the need to assess profitability and minimise negative environmental effects during the opening of a two-day symposium on environmental practices in Brunei. That same year, he also encouraged Bruneian entrepreneurs to focus on producing high-quality building materials rather than merely acting as suppliers and end customers. Speaking at the Brunei International Building Exhibition, he underscored the value of independence and reducing reliance on external expertise. He urged local businesses to invest in research and development, either by purchasing and commercialising technology or by outsourcing projects to foreign organisations, while emphasising the importance of utilising local talent in these initiatives.

On 30 July 1996, Pengiran Ismail officially renamed Bukit Beruang Secondary School in Tutong to Sayyidina 'Othman Secondary School. On 14 October 1996, he highlighted the importance of enhancing Brunei's building sector to attract more locals. He emphasised the need for high-quality work, excellent safety records, and robust quality management systems. Pengiran Ismail also stressed the importance of supporting local entrepreneurs, encouraging them to fill the void left by those who had expanded internationally. He called for a self-disciplined approach within the industry to ensure all stakeholders focus on delivering exceptional work to remain competitive globally. In the same year, Pengiran Ismail noted that despite Brunei's high per capita income and gross national income, the country lacked the infrastructure, sociological development, and economic diversity characteristic of highly developed nations. In response to an OECD claim that Brunei was a developed country, he pointed out that, under the 7th National Development Plan (1996–2000), efforts to increase productivity, diversify the economy, and develop human capital were ongoing. However, the economy remained heavily reliant on oil and gas, with other industries contributing little to the GDP.

As deputy chair of the task force investigating the 1998 collapse of Prince Jefri Bolkiah-led Amedeo Development Corporation (ADC), Pengiran Ismail displayed rare public candour when he said, "I wish I knew what is going on," reflecting the government's confusion with the situation. His comment, "I do not know what went wrong," highlighted the unusual transparency regarding financial issues involving a member of the royal family. While the exact sums involved remain unclear, the task force's preliminary report in September indicated that funds from the Brunei Investment Agency had been embezzled. The public eagerly awaited the final report to assess the extent of the losses and the government's commitment to transparency. On 29 June 1998, Pengiran Ismail also attended the fourth ASEAN Ministerial Meeting on Haze in Singapore.

=== Termination and conviction ===
On 28 May 2001, Pengiran Ismail was removed from his ministerial position, following a public announcement by the Prime Minister's Office, with no reason given for the decision. He was succeeded by Ahmad Jumat, who continued in his role as deputy minister of education while also assuming the position of acting minister of development.

Pengiran Ismail faced legal troubles after being found guilty of accepting bribes and receiving gratifications during his tenure as minister of development. The trial, which began in 2005 and spanned several years, culminated in a conviction in 2010. He was found guilty of eight counts of accepting bribes and three counts of receiving gratifications, resulting in a seven-year prison sentence and a financial restitution of over B$4.2 million. The charges arose from his acceptance of gifts and valuables from Wong Tim Kai, the managing director of TED Sendirian Berhad, a major contractor in Brunei, between 1992 and 1999, during which TED was awarded numerous government contracts. Pengiran Ismail appealed the conviction, arguing that he was not a public servant in his role as IPS, but the court rejected this argument. The judge ruled that his actions were serious breaches of trust, involving substantial public funds, and ordered him to pay restitution or face additional imprisonment. On 18 February 2010, the Brunei High Court officially concluded the trial, convicting Pengiran Ismail on 11 corruption charges and sentencing him to seven years in prison.

== Later life ==
On 8 August 2019, Pengiran Ismail attended the signing of a memorandum of agreement between the Institution of Surveyors, Engineers and Architects (PUJA) Brunei and the Institution of Civil Engineers (ICE) UK. In 2021, he was present at the 10th anniversary celebration of the Football Association of Brunei Darussalam, which was held at the Parkview Hotel in Kampong Jerudong. Additionally, as one of the founders and key leaders of Koperasi Samakaya, Pengiran Ismail attended the cooperative's 45th anniversary celebration in Bandar Seri Begawan on 18 May 2023.

== Personal life ==
Pengiran Ismail has a son, Pengiran Shamsulhadi, who serves as the general manager contract and commercial at Petrokon Utama.

== Titles, styles and honours ==
=== Titles and styles ===
Pengiran Ismail was honoured by Sultan Hassanal Bolkiah with the cheteria title of Pengiran Indera Wijaya, bearing the style Yang Amat Mulia.

=== Honours ===
Pengiran Ismail has been bestowed the following honours:

- Order of Setia Negara Brunei First Class (PSNB) – Dato Seri Setia
- Order of Seri Paduka Mahkota Brunei First Class (SPMB) – Dato Seri Paduka
- Order of Paduka Seri Laila Jasa Second Class (DSLJ) – Dato Seri Laila Jasa
- Meritorious Service Medal (PJK)
- Long Service Medal (PKL)
- Proclamation of Independence Medal (1997)
- Sultan of Brunei Silver Jubilee Medal (5 October 1992)

Political offices
Preceded by Abdul Rahman Taib	2nd Minister of Development; 20 October 1986 – 28 May 2001	Succeeded by Ahmad Jumat
