= Hamdillah Abdul Wahab =

Brunei politician and engineer

Dato Paduka Hamdillah Abdul Wahab DPMB SNB
- حمدي الله عبدالوهاب
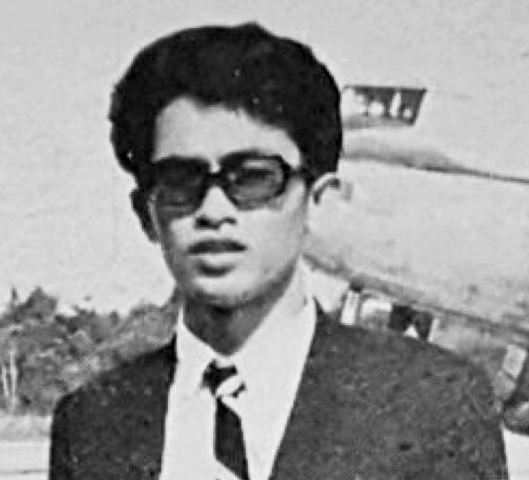
- Hamdillah c. 1966

Deputy Minister of Industry and Primary Resources
- In office 24 May 2005 – 29 May 2010
- Monarch: Hassanal Bolkiah
- Minister: Ahmad Jumat; Yahya Bakar
- Preceded by: Office established
- Succeeded by: Office abolished

Personal details
- Education: Sultan Omar Ali Saifuddien College
- Alma mater: McGill University (BEng)
- Occupation: Politician; engineer

Hamdillah bin Haji Abdul Wahab is a Bruneian politician and engineer who became the deputy minister at the Ministry of Industry and Primary Resources from 2005 to 2010. He is also the founding president of the Brunei Energy Association (BEnA) and the Brunei-Japan Friendship (BJFA).

== Education ==
After graduating from Sultan Omar Ali Saifuddien College in 1966, Hamdillah attended McGill University in Montreal, where he studied chemical engineering until 1974. He had positions as a plant technician at the Shell Stanlow Refinery in the United Kingdom, a technical advisor at the Shell International Head Office in Den Haag, a research assistant at the Pulp & Paper Research Institute at McGill University, and plant manager at the Shell Pernis Refinery in Rotterdam, Holland.

== Career ==
At Brunei LNG (BLNG), Brunei Shell Funds, Brunei Shell Petroleum, and Brunei Shell Tankers, Hamdillah held the position of director of the board. He also served on the steering committee of the Brunei Gas Masterplan, a member of the Belait Municipal Council, was a member of the Universiti Brunei Darussalam (UBD) council, and was an advisor to ketua kampung of Kampong Lumut under the Ministry of Home Affairs.

At BLNG, he served as CEO. In November 2000, he chaired the APEC CEO Summit, E-Trade Fair, and SME Business Forum. He served as the co-chair of the SME Informal Caucus in 2000, the SME Committee in 1997, and an ASEAN Business Advisory Council (ABAC) member from 1996 to 2000.

On 24 May 2005, Hamdillah was appointed as the Deputy Minister of Industry and Primary Resources, under Ahmad Jumat. He became the first private sector employee to be appointed to a government position. He acts as the representative minister while the minister is absent or on leave. Despite the strong trade numbers between ASEM (Asia–Europe Meeting) member nations, he stated there was still more space for development in September 2005.

Despite holding a ministerial position in the ministry, Hamdillah would also become the chairman of the Brunei HoB National Council. He highlighted the necessity of completing the paper that outlined the institutional structures and procedures that would govern the HoB Initiative. He pointed out that similarly sustainable money was necessary for the HoB's sustainable development. In order to achieve the shared goals, "our friends from the World Wildlife Fund will be assisting us to develop a long term financing scheme," he stated.

== Other works ==
Following his tenure with the Brunei government, he was reported to have transitioned into a regional businessman with a plethora of industry interests.

The Brunei Japan Friendship Association (BJFA) chose Hamdillah as its president. The BJFA has placed a renewed focus on volunteerism, business, and youth development under his direction. He and the Japanese ambassador would often provide encouraging messages to visiting Japanese high school and university students. In July 2018, he also gave an overview of JBFA's initiatives to strengthen ties between Brunei and Japan, including a one-week study tour to Japan for Bruneian university students interested in industry and culture.

== Personal life ==
Hamdillah have a sibling named Dato Paduka Haji Mohammad Alimin, chairman of Royal Brunei Airlines (RBA). According to what his brother said in an interview with Inspire, his family was deeply religious. Their mother would ensure that they had to abide by the regulations. In addition, Mohammad Alimin said that their father, Abdul Wahab, did not spend enough time with them throughout their formative years since it was an acknowledgement of his own limitations, which included his inability to read and write and the trouble he had signing his name.

== Honours ==
Hamdillah is known to be awarded the following honours:

National

- Order of Seri Paduka Mahkota Brunei Second Class (DPMB; 1998) – Dato Paduka
- Order of Setia Negara Brunei Third Class (SNB; 1993)

Foreign

- Japan:
  - Order of the Rising Sun Second Class (3 November 2013)
