= Adina binti Othman =

Bruneian bureaucrat (born 1955)

Datin Paduka Adina binti Othman DPMB SNB
- ادينا بنت عثمان
- Datin Adina in Tokyo, 2015

3rd Deputy Minister of Culture, Youth and Sports
- In office 29 May 2010 – 22 October 2015
- Monarch: Hassanal Bolkiah
- Minister: Hazair Abdullah
- Preceded by: Yakub Abu Bakar
- Succeeded by: Office abolished

Personal details
- Born: 31 May 1955 (age 71) Kuala Belait, Belait, Brunei
- Parent: Othman @ Chua Kwang Soon
- Education: University of Kent (BA)

Adina binti Othman @ Chua (born 31 May 1955) is a Bruneian bureaucrat of Chinese descent whom served as the Deputy Minister of Culture, Youth and Sports between 2010 and 2015 and was the first woman in Brunei to hold the position of the deputy minister.

== Early life and education ==
Adina is born on 31 May 1955 in Kuala Belait, Belait. She has a bachelor's degree in Southeast Asian studies and law, and a post-graduate degree in archives administration.

== Political career ==
Before her appointment as a Deputy Minister, Adina spent 32 years working at the Ministry of Culture, Youth and Sports. During her time at the ministry, she held a number of positions including Special Duties Officer, Head of Youth and Sport Affairs and Community Development Director. Alongside the Department of Youth and Sports, she also worked at the Museums Department.

In 2009, Adina received the Brunei Woman Leader in Civil Society Award. Based on her work in youth and communal development, she was appointed as Brunei's representative to the ASEAN Commission on the Promotion and Protection of the Rights of Women and Children in April 2010. Here, she represented Brunei with regards to children's rights issues. She held the position until October 2011.

In the 2010 Bruneian cabinet reshuffle on 29 May, Adina was appointed deputy minister of by Sultan Hassanal Bolkiah, in a move seen as adding "new blood" to the new cabinet. She served as the acting minister for a period in 2015. Her tenure came to an end during the 2015 cabinet reshuffle on 22 October.

Datin Adina has a number of articles published in peer-reviewed journals. Additionally, she has contributed to other research articles, two of which are titled "Breaking the Cycle of Poverty" and "Decline in Moral Values among the Youth of Brunei Darussalam." She has participated in numerous panels that have covered social welfare, community service, and youth development.

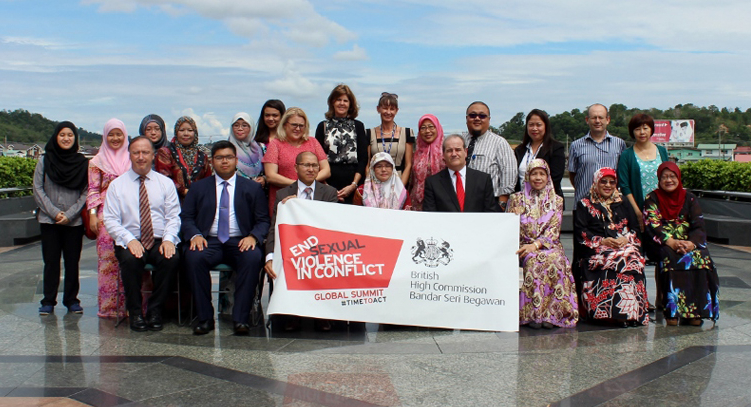
Adina at an event to combat sexual violence in 2014

== Honours ==
Throughout her career, Adina has earned the following honours:

- Order of Seri Paduka Mahkota Brunei Second Class (DPMB; 15 July 2011) – Datin Paduka
- Order of Setia Negara Brunei Third Class (SNB; 15 July 2010)

Political offices
Preceded by Yakub Abu Bakar	3rd Deputy Minister of Culture, Youth and Sports; 29 May 2010 – 22 October 2015	Succeeded by Office abolished
