= Yahya Bakar =

Bruneian politician (born 1954)

Yang Dimuliakan Pehin Orang Kaya Seri Utama Dato Seri Setia Yahya Bakar PSNB SPMB DSNB PJK PIKB PKL CVO
- يحي بكر
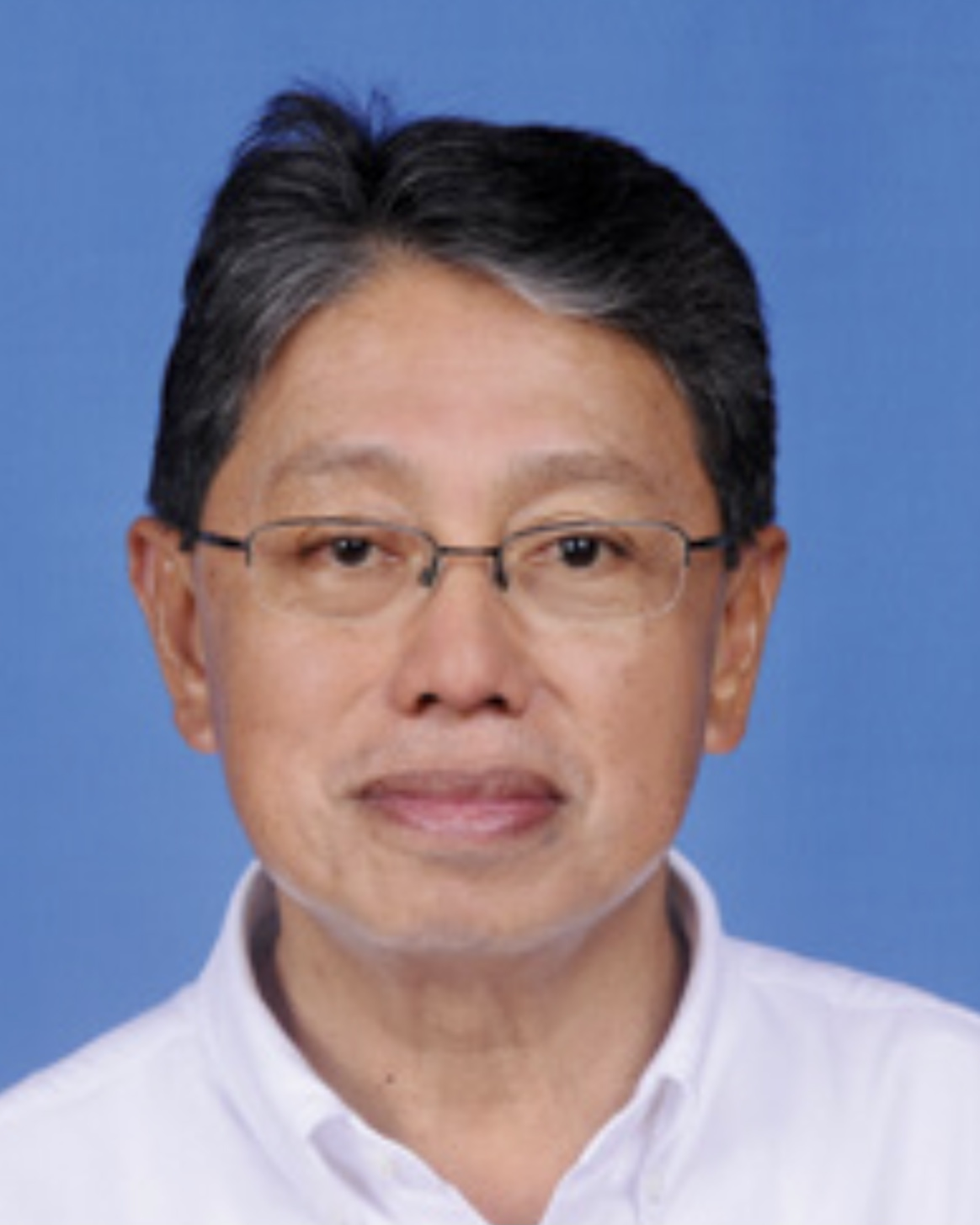
- Minister Yahya in 2015

3rd Minister of Industry and Primary Resources
- In office 22 August 2008 – 22 October 2015
- Monarch: Hassanal Bolkiah
- Deputy: Hamdillah Abdul Wahab
- Preceded by: Ahmad Jumat
- Succeeded by: Ali Apong

1st Minister of Energy
- In office 24 May 2005 – 22 August 2008
- Preceded by: Office established
- Succeeded by: Mohammad Daud

Personal details
- Born: 4 May 1957 (age 69) Lurong Dalam, Kampong Ayer, Brunei
- Relatives: Abdullah Bakar (brother)
- Education: Stirling University (BA); Fletcher School of Law and Diplomacy (MA)
- Occupation: Civil servant; politician

Yahya bin Bakar (born 4 May 1954), also referred to Pehin Dato Yahya Bakar, is a Bruneian aristocrat and politician whom formerly held the position of Minister of Energy from 2005 to 2008, and Minister of Industry and Primary Resources from 2008 to 2015.

== Early life and education ==
Yahya is born on 4 May 1957 at Kampong Lurong Dalam of Kampong Ayer, and obtained his BA (Hons) Economics from the Stirling University in 1979, Diploma of Education from the Institute of Education, National University of Singapore in 1982, MA in International law and Diplomacy from Fletcher School of Law and Diplomacy in 1987.

== Career ==
Yahya first began his career as an education officer from 1979 to 1983; an administrative officer at the Ministry of Foreign Affairs (KHELN) from 1983 to 1987; the Deputy Director general of ASEAN, KHELN from 1987 to 1989; the Director of the Department of Economics, KHELN from 1989 to 1990; the Confidential and Secret Secretary to Prince Mohamed Bolkiah, KHELN from 1990 to 1992; the senior administrative officer in the Office of His Majesty the Sultan and Yang Di-Pertuan of Brunei Darussalam from 1992 to September 1997; the permanent secretary in the Prime Minister's Office (PMO) from 1 October 1997 to 23 May 2005; appointed as Director of the Anti-Corruption Bureau from 7 July 1997 9 May 2000; the chairman of the Brunei Investment Agency (BIA) from 22 January 2000 to 27 November 2001 and from February 2003 to 22 August 2008; and member of the Privy Council on 6 May 2003.

In the 2005 Bruneian cabinet reshuffle on 24 May, Yahya was appointed Minister of Energy in the PMO. He was later reappointed on 22 August 2008, as Minister of Industry and Primary Resources.

=== Heart of Borneo ===
These were the main points made by Pehin Yahya Bakar during a public forum on 5 September 2012, at the Institute of Southeast Asian Studies (ISEAS), Singapore, about protecting nature in the Heart of Borneo (HoB). Expanding on his first call to action, the Minister urged a revitalization and fresh focus on the three nations' Heart of Borneo goal, which they announced in Bali in 2007. This vision calls for the efficient management of forest resources, the preservation of a system of productive forests, protected areas, and other sustainable land uses across the HoB, all while ensuring the welfare of the populace. The Minister stated that the initiative urgently needed extra funding. not only by the affected nations but also by the rest of the world. He also cautioned that having only financial resources was insufficient. He demanded an increase in human resources as well, and education was one of the finest methods to achieve this.

If we squander the Bornean rainforests, we threaten life itself. We must stay focused and commit more resources in order to preserve the last remaining tropical rainforests of the world – especially in the Heart of Borneo (HoB). There is a definite need to ‘reconvene’ the meeting of the Ministers responsible for Forestry from Brunei Darussalam, Indonesia and Malaysia to take stock of the achievements so far and to refresh the HoB Declaration mandate after five years of progress on HoB issues. We need to continue to educate the public at large. It is vital to maintain and sustain public interest and momentum in the HoB Initiative as there are many other vested interests that have other more destructive plans for the HoB. Our education sector has the greatest opportunity to truly empower us and our future generations to make a difference.

— Pehin Orang Kaya Seri Utama Dato Seri Setia Awang Haji Yahya bin Begawan Mudim Dato Paduka Haji Bakar, World Wide Fund

=== US-ABC ===
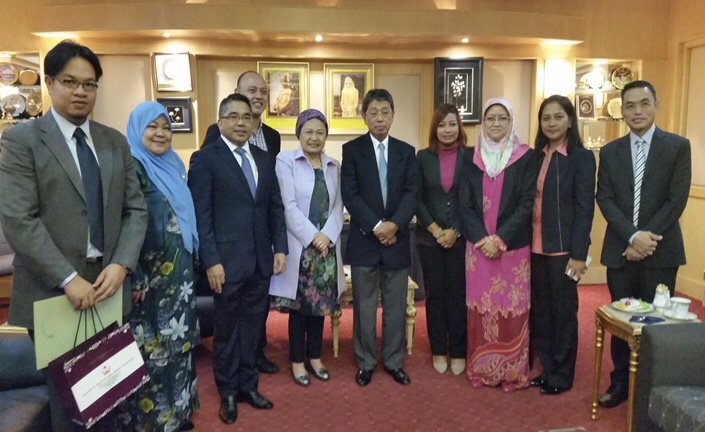
Minister Yahya together with the delegation from National Commission on Muslim Filipinos in 2015.

On 22 May 2015, Pehin Dato Yahya urged the creation of a Brunei Darussalam-United States Small Business Alliance to aid Brunei in diversifying its economy and developing new markets for products other than oil and gas. He made this remark yesterday during a discussion session for Bruneian SMEs held at the Design and Technology Building in Anggerek Desa and sponsored by the US-Asean Business Council (US-ABC). He also emphasized the necessity for the nation to strengthen the capacities of its SMEs for them to become highly competitive, innovative, and capable of gaining from the globalization process and the TPP, given the strong forces of globalization and the upcoming Trans-Pacific Partnership (TPP).

=== International Day of Forests 2014 ===
During a speech begin by him at the International Day of Forests 2014 Launch Ceremony and the "GREENING THE CITY, SAVING THE PLANET: MAKING A DIFFERENCE, ONE TREE AT A TIME" Program Launch, he emphasized the need to strike a balance between social-economic development and environmental stability, and that the Ministry of Industry and Primary Resources has taken several proactive steps to further protect and manage the nation's forest resources. Additionally, the Ministry of Industry and Primary Resources will take strategic action to transfer timber harvesting from the forest reserve to the non-forest reserve or stateland forests in the Inter Riverine Zone (also known as IRZ) between the Belait and the Tutong Rivers in order to ensure that the forest resources are conserved. This strategy, known as the "Tree Farmland Concept," will mix logging and harvesting with replanting and reforestation activities.

Following the 2015 Bruneian cabinet reshuffle on 22 October, his tenure as minister came to an end.

== Other appointments ==
Throughout his career, he has also held several key positions such as the acting chairman of the board of directors of Brunei Investment Agency (BIA), member of the Brunei Oil and Gas Authority (BOGA), member of the board of directors of Brunei Shell Petroleum (BSP) Company, member of the board of directors of the Semaun Holding Company, member of the board of directors of the Semaunprim Company, member of the board of directors of SEIWA Enterprise, member of the board of directors of SEAGRO, and member of the board of directors of SEMAUN SEAFOOD.

== Personal life ==
Yahya is married to DNorlina binti Abu Bakar, and together they have 5 children; 2 sons and 3 daughters. He is also the younger brother of Dato Abdullah Bakar, former Minister of Communications. Permanent Secretary at the Ministry of Defence, Captain (Retired) Dato Abdul Rahman is another sibling of his. His hobbies are reading and playing badminton.

== Honours ==
Yahya was bestowed the Manteri title of Yang Berhormat (The Honourable) Pehin Orang Kaya Seri Utama on 11 July 1996. Moreover, he has earned the following honours;

National

- Order of Setia Negara Brunei First Class (PSNB; 15 July 2006) – Dato Seri Setia
- Order of Setia Negara Brunei Second Class (DSNB)
- Order of Seri Paduka Mahkota Brunei First Class (SPMB; July 1998) – Dato Seri Paduka
- Meritorious Service Medal (PJK; 15 February 1999)
- Excellent Service Medal (PIKB; 1989)
- Long Service Medal (PKL)
- Proclamation of Independence Medal (1997)
- Sultan of Brunei Silver Jubilee Medal (5 October 1992)

Foreign

- United Kingdom
  - Commander of the Royal Victorian Order (CVO; 1992)
- France
  - Commander of the Legion of Honour (1997)
- Thailand
  - Knight Grand Cross of the Order of the White Elephant (PCh (KCE); August 2002)

Political offices
Preceded by Ahmad Jumat	3rd Minister of Industry and Primary Resources; 22 August 2008 – 22 October 2015	Succeeded by Ali Apong
Preceded by Office established	1st Minister of Energy; 24 May 2005 – 22 August 2008	Succeeded by Mohammad Daud
Business positions
Preceded by Abdullah Bakar	Chairman of Bank Islam Brunei Darussalam; 2010–2013	Succeeded by Bahrin Abdullah
