= Hazair Abdullah =

Bruneian politician (born 1953)

Yang Dimuliakan Pehin Orang Kaya Pekerma Laila Diraja Dato Seri Setia Hazair Abdullah PSNB DPMB PJK PIKB PKL
- هزااير عبدالله
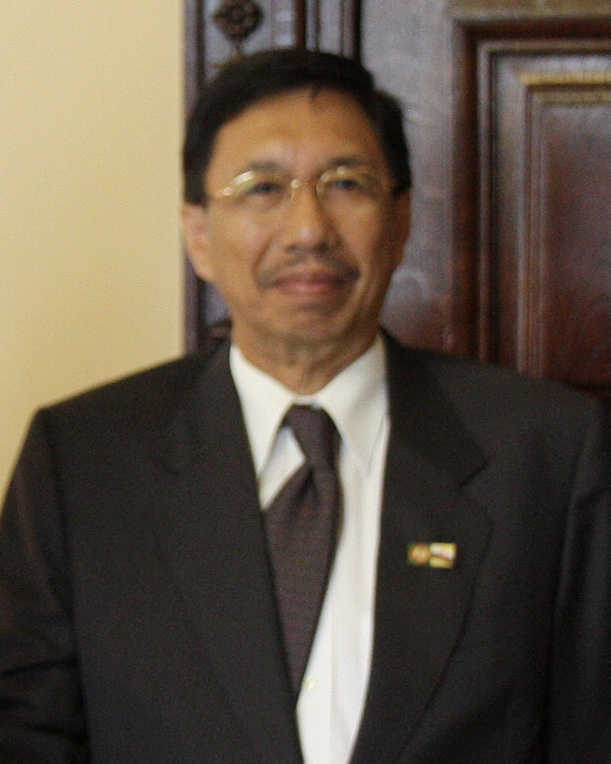
- Minister Hazair in 2012

5th Minister of Culture, Youth and Sports
- In office 29 May 2010 – 22 October 2015
- Monarch: Hassanal Bolkiah
- Deputy: Adina Othman
- Preceded by: Ahmad Jumat
- Succeeded by: Halbi Mohammad Yussof

Deputy Minister of Health
- In office 24 May 2005 – 29 May 2010
- Minister: Suyoi Osman
- Preceded by: Office established
- Succeeded by: Office abolished
Other positions
Chairman of Royal Brunei Airlines
In office 31 March 2003 – 1 June 2005
Preceded by	Alimin Abdul Wahab
Succeeded by	Abdul Hamid Yassin

Personal details
- Born: 6 August 1953 Kampong Lurong Dalam, Kampong Ayer, Brunei
- Died: 21 October 2026 (aged 73)
- Spouse: Rosnah Johari
- Children: 4
- Education: Staffordshire University (BA)
- Profession: Politician
- Cabinet: Cabinet of Brunei

Hazair bin Haji Abdullah @ Hazari (6 August 1953 – 21 October 2026) was a Bruneian aristocrat and politician who formerly held the position of Deputy Minister of Health (MOH) from 2005 to 2010, and Minister of Culture, Youth and Sports (MCYS) from 2010 to 2015. Notably, he was also the Brunei Representative of Human rights commission to ASEAN, chairman of the Royal Brunei Airlines and subsidiaries from 2003 to 2005, Public Service Reform Committee, Public Service Day Committee, E-Government Executive Committee, Chairman of the Police Commission, Criminal Law Act Advisory Committee, and the deputy chairman of the Employee Trust Fund.

== Early life and education ==
Hazair was born on 6 August 1953 at Kampong Lurong Dalam, in Kampong Ayer, and educated at the Berakas Primary School, Delmia Satu Primary School and Sultan Omar Ali Saifuddien College. He obtained his B.A. (Hons) in Politics and International Relations at North Staffordshire Polythenic on 31 December 1979. Additionally, he undertook the Diploma Course in Foreign Service Oxford University from 1985 to 1986, the London Business School Senior Executive Program Course in 1977, and Foreign Service Course Canberra in 1982.

== Political career ==
Hazair first began his career as an education officer at the Education Department in 1979, and later an administrative officer in the Personnel Department, an administrative officer in the Office of the General Counsel of His Majesty the Sultan and Yang Di-Pertuan of Brunei Darussalam, the High Commission of Brunei Darussalam in Kuala Lumpur and London, a senior administrative officer at the Office of the General Counsel to His Majesty the Sultan and Yang Di-Pertuan of Brunei Darussalam in the Prime Minister's Department (JPM) from 1986 to 1991, the director of Information from 1991 to 1996, a senior administrative officer at JPM from 1996 to 1997, the JPM permanent secretary from 1 October 1997 to 23 May 2005.

Hazair's ministerial career began after his appointed as the Deputy Minister of Health from 24 May 2005 to 28 May 2010. During the 2010 Bruneian cabinet reshuffle, he was appointed Minister of Culture, Youth and Sports on 29 May.

In his opening remarks at the 10th ASEAN Socio-Cultural Community Council, he expressed confidence that, if the momentum of previous years was maintained, ASEAN will accomplish its socio-cultural goals. He said that by including the human element in ASEAN's larger efforts at regional cooperation and community development, it would guarantee that its member states and inhabitants would equally benefit from growth and the advantages of economic integration. Additionally, it was said that ASEAN has maintained to value human growth and development in recent years. He said that the focus of Brunei Darussalam's presidency this year, "Our People, Our Future Together," was creating an ASEAN Community that was focused on its citizens and socially responsible.

Hazair stated on 3 June 2014, that Bruneian youth should respond to criticism of the application of Syariah law with poise and maturity. According to him, Brunei has consistently been under fire from outside sources for its implementation of the Syariah Penal Code Order 2013, primarily on social media. Young professionals have spoken out in favor of Sultan Hassanal Bolkiah's choice to enact syariah law and have taken an unshakable stand against criticism, mockery, and disdain that have come from outside, he said.

The theme "Generation with a Vision" will once again be chosen for the National Day events, which organizers have already begun planning. He said that the committee decided to stick with the topic until it is appropriate to modify it during the inaugural Executive Committee Meeting for the 31st National Day festivities on 23 September 2014. His tenure ended in the 2015 Bruneian cabinet reshuffle on 22 October.

=== e-Government ===
Hazair gave a speech in conjunction with the Canada Innovation Forum on 29 November 2001, in which he highlighted the factors affecting the Brunei government's transition initiatives toward the implementation of E-government. These variables encompassed three core strategies that were part of the e-Government programs. The third developmental stage, he continued, refers to social resources that may be used to leverage capacity, capability, and innovation at the front of an ICT-led economy. He also emphasized that the commitment and cooperation of the entire civil service, as well as an understanding of the challenges that will be faced, are crucial to the success of the implementation of the e-Government Programme into the Brunei Civil Service as a major national agenda item.

=== Recycling ===
Dato Hazair is a supporter of recycling programs throughout the country. In a visit to the initiative allows the general population to exchange recyclables for rice, he stated:

It is already certain that a programme like Green Xchange will help instil a culture of love and care in society for cleanliness and care towards the environment. The involvement of youth today can be connected to "International Volunteer Day" ...the youth present here prove that not only are they active, but possess the spirit of patriotism and responsibility towards the society and country they live in.

— Pehin Orang Kaya Pekerma Laila Diraja Dato Seri Setia Haji Hazair bin Haji Abdullah, Society for Community Outreach & Training

== Death ==
Hazair died on 21 October 2026 at the age of 73. His remains were laid to rest at the Royal Mausoleum, Bandar Seri Begawan.

== Personal life ==
Hazair is married to Rosnah binti Johari and have four children; two sons and two daughters. The family resides in Jalan Muara, Kampong Salambigar.

== Books ==
- Hazair bin Haji Abdullah, (Awang Haji.) (1996). Peranan dan tanggungjawab rakyat kebawah Duli Yang Maha Mulia Paduka Seri Baginda Sultan dan Yang Di-Pertuan Negara Brunei Darussalam (in Malay). Jabatan Penerangan, Jabatan Perdana Menteri, Negara Brunei Darussalam.

== Titles, styles and honours ==
=== Titles and styles ===
On 10 April 2004, Hazair was honoured by Sultan Hassanal Bolkiah with the manteri title of Pehin Orang Kaya Pekerma Laila Diraja, bearing the style Yang Dimuliakan.

=== Honours ===
In addition to earning the following honours;

- Order of Setia Negara Brunei First Class (PSNB; 15 July 2011) – Dato Seri Setia
- Order of Setia Negara Brunei Fourth Class (PSB; 15 July 1990)
- Order of Seri Paduka Mahkota Brunei Second Class (DPMB) – Dato Paduka
- Meritorious Service Medal (PJK)
- Excellent Service Medal (PIKB)
- Long Service Medal (PKL)
- Proclamation of Independence Medal (1997)
- Sultan of Brunei Silver Jubilee Medal (5 October 1992)

Political offices
Preceded by Ahmad Jumat	5th Minister of Culture, Youth and Sports; 29 May 2010 – 22 October 2015	Succeeded by Halbi Mohammad Yussof
Preceded by Office established	Deputy Minister of Health; 24 May 2005 – 29 May 2010	Succeeded by Office abolished
Business positions
Preceded by Alimin Abdul Wahab	Chairman of Royal Brunei Airlines; 31 March 2003 – 1 June 2005	Succeeded by Abdul Hamid Yassin
