= Ministry of Culture, Youth and Sports (Brunei) =

Government ministry of Brunei

Ministry of Culture, Youth and Sports, Brunei Darussalam
- Kementerian Kebudayaan, Belia dan Sukan
- National emblem of Brunei

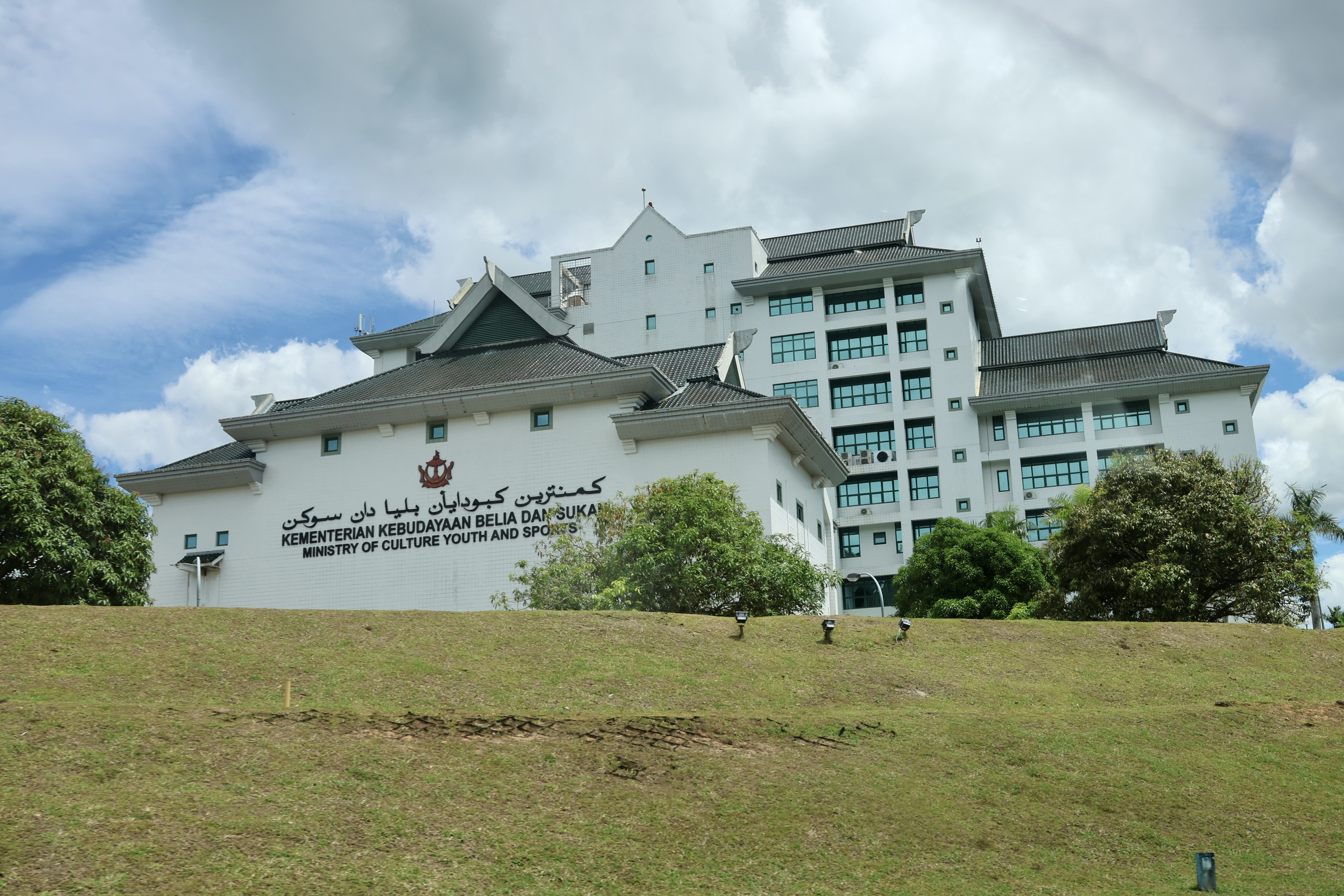
- Ministry of Culture, Youth and Sports building

Ministry overview
- Formed: 1 January 1984; 42 years ago
- Jurisdiction: Government of Brunei Darussalam
- Status: active
- Headquarters: Bandar Seri Begawan, Brunei-Muara, Brunei Darussalam; 04°55′30″N 114°57′27″E
- Employees: 1,741 (2024)
- Annual budget: ▲BND93 million (2022)
- Minister responsible: Pengiran Dato Seri Setia Haji Shamhary bin Pengiran Dato Paduka Haji Mustapha (Note: He was appointed Minister of Culture, Youth and Sports on 4 June 2026, having previously served as Minister of Transport and Infocommunications from 2022 to 2026), Minister of Culture, Youth and Sports
- Website: www.KKBS.gov.bn

Ministry of Culture, Youth and Sports, Brunei Darussalam (MCYS; Malay: Kementerian Kebudayaan, Belia dan Sukan; KKBS) is a ministry in the Government of Brunei Darussalam responsible for the policies and development of the country's national culture, youth, sports, community development and social welfare. The ministry was established immediately upon Brunei's independence on 1 January 1984. It is headed by the Minister of Culture, Youth and Sports. The incumbent is Pengiran Dato Seri Setia Haji Shamhary bin Pengiran Dato Paduka Haji Mustapha, who assumed office on 4 June 2026 following the cabinet reshuffle announced by His Majesty the Sultan of Brunei. The ministry is headquartered in the Diplomatic Enclave, Jalan Kebangsaan, Bandar Seri Begawan, in the Brunei-Muara District, Brunei.

== Role in ASEAN ==
The Ministry of Culture, Youth and Sports serves as Brunei Darussalam's national coordinating ministry for the ASEAN Socio-Cultural Community (ASCC). Through its Research, Development and International Affairs Division, the ministry functions as the National Secretariat for the ASCC, coordinating national positions, monitoring the implementation of ASEAN commitments, facilitating inter-ministerial consultations, and supporting Brunei Darussalam's participation in the ASEAN Socio-Cultural Community Council (ASCC Council) and the Senior Officials Committee for the ASEAN Socio-Cultural Community (SOCA).

The ministry also serves as Brunei Darussalam's lead agency for several ASEAN sectoral bodies through its respective divisions.

- The Youth and Sports Development Division represents Brunei in the Senior Officials Meeting on Youth (SOMY) and the Senior Officials Meeting on Sports (SOMS);
- The Culture and Arts Division serves as the national focal point for the Senior Officials Meeting on Culture and Arts (SOMCA); and
- The Social Services Division represents Brunei in the Senior Officials Meeting on Social Welfare and Development (SOMSWD), the ASEAN Committee on Women (ACW), the Senior Officials Meeting on Rural Development and Poverty Eradication (SOMRDPE), and the ASEAN Commission on the Promotion and Protection of the Rights of Women and Children (ACWC).

== Organisations ==
The ministry oversees the following government organisations:

- Brunei History Centre (Pusat Sejarah Brunei) — responsible for the official research and dissemination on the history of Brunei;
- Museums Department (Jabatan Muzium-Muzium) — manages public museums nationwide, as well as heritage and archaeological sites;
- Language and Literature Bureau (Dewan Bahasa dan Pustaka, DBP) — the country's language authority and operator of public libraries;
- Youth and Sports Department (Jabatan Belia dan Sukan, JBS) — oversees the development of national youth and sports, national athletes and public sports facilities;
- Community Development Department (Jabatan Pembangunan Masyarakat, JAPEM) — mainly manages the provision of welfare to the disabled, the needy and orphans;
- National Archives (Arkib Negara) — the country's national archives;
- Youth Development Centre (Pusat Pembangunan Belia, PPB) — a post-secondary institution providing basic vocational training skills;
- National Service Programme (Program Khidmat Bakti Negara, PKBN) — the country's voluntary military national service.

The Sports School (Sekolah Sukan), the sole sports school in the country, was formerly managed by the ministry but has since been transferred to the Ministry of Education.

== Budget ==
In the fiscal year 2022–2023, the ministry has been allocated a budget of B$98 million, (Note: ≈US$72 million as of March 2023) a 5.7 percent increase from the previous year.

== List of ministers ==
=== Ministers ===
No.	Portrait	Minister	Term start	Term end	Time in office	Ref.
1		Jefri Bolkiah	1 January 1984	20 October 1986	2 years, 292 days	
2		Hussain Yusof	20 October 1986	24 May 2005	18 years, 216 days	
3		Mohammad Daud	24 May 2005	22 August 2008	3 years, 90 days	
4		Ahmad Jumat	22 August 2008	29 May 2010	1 year, 280 days	
5		Hazair Abdullah	29 May 2010	22 October 2015	5 years, 146 days	
6		Halbi Mohd Yussof	22 October 2015	29 January 2018	2 years, 99 days	
7		Aminuddin Ihsan	30 January 2018	7 June 2022	4 years, 128 days	
8		Nazmi Mohamad	7 June 2022	4 June 2026	3 years, 362 days	
9		Pengiran Shamhary Pengiran Mustapha	4 June 2026	incumbent	125 days	

=== Deputy Ministers ===
No.	Portrait	Minister	Term start	Term end	Time in office	Ref.
1		Ali Mohammad Daud	20 October 1986	1 January 1989	2 years, 73 days	
2		Selamat Munap	1 January 1989	20 September 2004	14–15 years	
3		Yakub Abu Bakar	20 September 2004	20 January 2007	2 years, 122 days	
4		Adina Othman	29 May 2010	22 October 2015	5 years, 146 days	
