= ASEAN Schools Sports Council =

- Abbreviation: ASSC
- Headquarters: Brunei

The ASEAN Schools Sports Council is an apolitical regional sports organization that promotes sports among ASEAN member countries. This sport organization was formed in 1978 to coordinate championship programs and activities in ASEAN countries. In 2008 the ASSC members agreed to adopt a multi-sport format similar to the Southeast Asian Games (SEA Games) for its competitions, and this gave birth to ASEAN School Games

== Objectives ==
- To promote ASEAN Solidarity in our youth through school sports;
- To provide opportunities for school athletes to benchmark their sporting talents in the ASEAN region; and
- To provide opportunities for school athletes to interact and engage in cultural exchange within ASEAN.
