= Ministry of Economy, Trade and Industry (Brunei) =

Government ministry of Brunei

Coordinates: 4°55′09″N 114°56′38″E

- Kementerian Ekonomi, Perdagangan dan Industri
- National emblem of Brunei

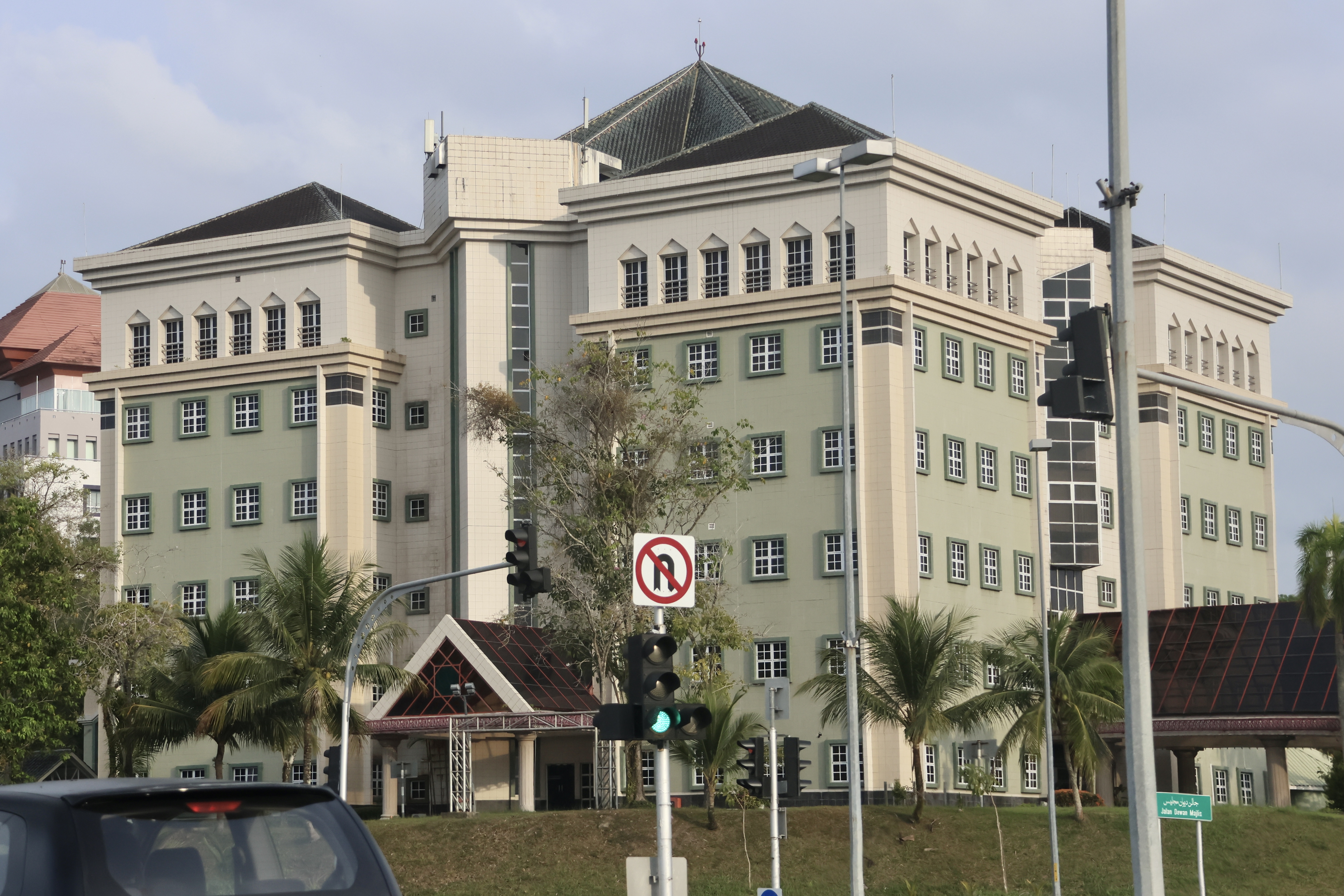
- METI's headquarters

Ministry overview
- Formed: 30 November 1988; 37 years ago
- Jurisdiction: Government of Brunei
- Headquarters: Bangunan Kementerian Ekonomi, Perdagangan dan Industri, Jalan Dewan Majlis, Bandar Seri Begawan, Brunei BB3913
- Employees: 1,426 (2024)
- Annual budget: ▲$96 million BND (2022)
- Minister responsible: Dato Seri Setia Dr. Haji Abdul Manaf bin Haji Metussin (Note: The official Malay name upon the appointment was Dato Seri Paduka Dr. Haji Abdul Manaf bin Haji Metussin.), Minister
- Deputy Minister responsible: Hajah Tutiaty Haji Abdul Wahab, Deputy Minister
- Website: www.mprt.gov.bn

The Ministry of Economy, Trade and Industry (METI; Malay: Kementerian Ekonomi, Perdagangan dan Industri, KEPI) is a cabinet-level ministry in the government of Brunei which oversees economic diversification, trade, industry, agriculture, fishing, forestry and tourism in the country. METI is currently led by a minister, and the incumbent is His Honourable Dato Seri Setia Abdul Manaf Metussin, who took office since 7 June 2022. The ministry is headquartered in Jalan Dewan Majlis, Bandar Seri Begawan.

== Background ==
The ministry was previously known as Ministry of Primary Resources and Tourism (MPRT; Kementerian Sumber-Sumber Utama dan Pelancongan), and the Ministry of Industry and Primary Resources (MIPR; Kementerian Perindustrian dan Sumber-Sumber Utama). The renaming was announced during a cabinet reshuffle announced by Sultan Hassanal Bolkiah on 4 June 2026, where it was intended to strengthen policy coordination, accelerate economic diversification, support sustainable economic growth, and create employment opportunities.

== Organisation ==
The ministry manages the following departments:

- Trade (Perdagangan)
- Industry (Bahagian Industri dan Ekosistem Perniagaan)
- Agriculture and Agrifood Department (Jabatan Pertanian dan Agrimakanan)
- Department of Fisheries (Jabatan Perikanan)
- Forestry Department (Jabatan Perhutanan)
- Tourism Development Department (Jabatan Kemajuan Pelancongan)

== Budget ==
In the 2022–23 fiscal year, the ministry has been allocated a budget of B$96 million, (Note: ≈US$69 million as of July 2022) a 40 percent increase from the previous year.

== Ministers ==
No.	Portrait	Minister	Term start	Term end	Time in office	Ref.
1		Abdul Rahman Taib	30 November 1988	24 May 2005	16 years, 175 days	
2		Ahmad Jumat	24 May 2005	22 August 2008	3 years, 90 days	
3		Yahya Bakar	22 August 2008	22 October 2015	7 years, 61 days	
4		Ali Apong	22 October 2015	7 June 2022	6 years, 228 days	
5		Abdul Manaf Metussin	7 June 2022	Incumbent	4 years, 59 days	
