= Bolkiah (disambiguation) =

Wikimedia disambiguation page

Bolkiah may refer to:

- Prince Jefri Bolkiah member of the Bruneian royal family
- House of Bolkiah a royal family of Brunei Darussalam
