= St John's Lodge, London =

Country estate in England

St John's Lodge
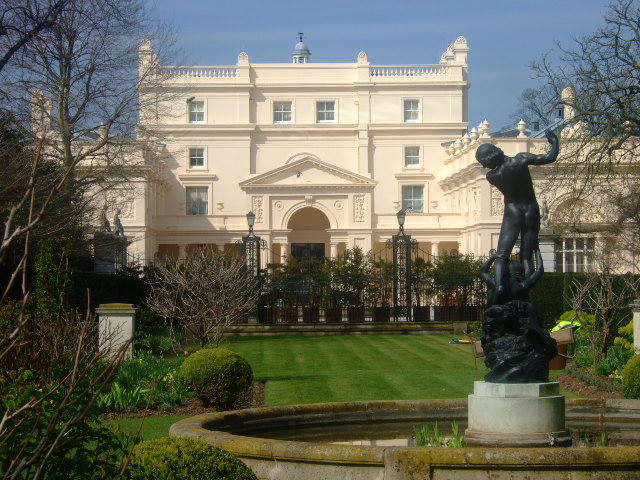
- St John's Lodge, in Regent's Park, London

- Location within Greater London
- 51.52957°N 0.15250°W
- Location: Inner Circle, Regent's Park, City of Westminster, London, England

History
- Built: 1812
- Built for: Charles Augustus Tulk

Site notes
- Architect: John Raffield
- Owner: Royal family of Brunei Darussalam

Listed Building – Grade II*
- Official name: St John's Lodge, Regent's Park
- Designated: 5 February 1970
- Reference no.: 1277478

St John's Lodge is a Grade II* heritage-listed private residence located in Regent's Park, in the City of Westminster, London, England. Since 1994 it has been owned by the royal family of Brunei Darussalam and is the London home of Prince Jefri Bolkiah of Brunei. St John's Lodge is located on the Inner Circle of Regent's Park, which until 1965 was in the Metropolitan Borough of St Marylebone and is now part of the City of Westminster.

== History ==
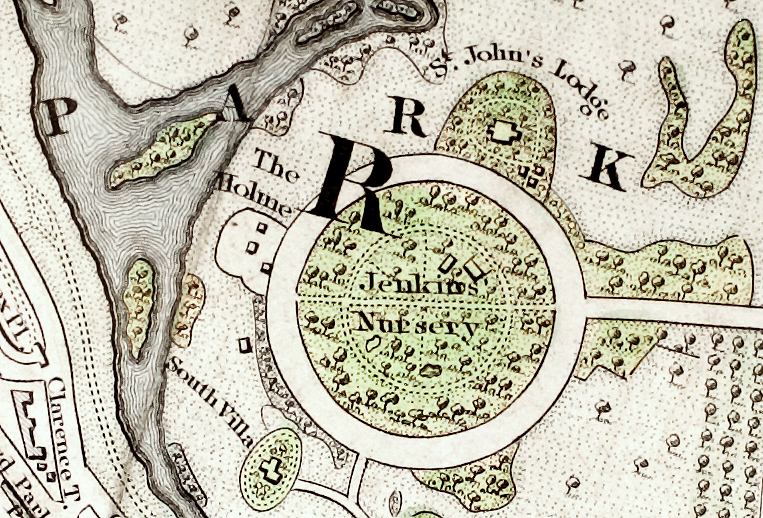
Map of the Inner Circle, c. 1833.

St John's Lodge was the first villa to be built in Regent's Park in 1812 and was designed for Charles Augustus Tulk by architect John Raffield. The Royal Parks service described St John's Lodge and The Holme as the only two villas remaining from John Nash's original conception of Regent's Park, which would have included a royal palace.

Other owners of the lodge have included Lord Wellesley, Sir Isaac Goldsmid, and John Crichton-Stuart, 3rd Marquess of Bute. The residence was occupied by the University of London's Institute of Archaeology from 1937 to 1959, and by the history and classics departments of Bedford College from 1959 to 1983. The adjoining gardens have been open to the public since 1928. St John's Lodge was bought in 1987 by the development company Messila House for £9 million who doubled it in size to 35,000 square feet (3,300 m^{2}) before being sold in 1994 to the royal family of Brunei Darussalam for £40 million, making it the most expensive private house in the UK at the time.

== Bibliography ==
- Stourton, James (2012). Great Houses of London. London: Frances Lincoln. ISBN 978-0-7112-3366-9. OCLC 814522913.
