= Car collection of the 29th Sultan of Brunei =

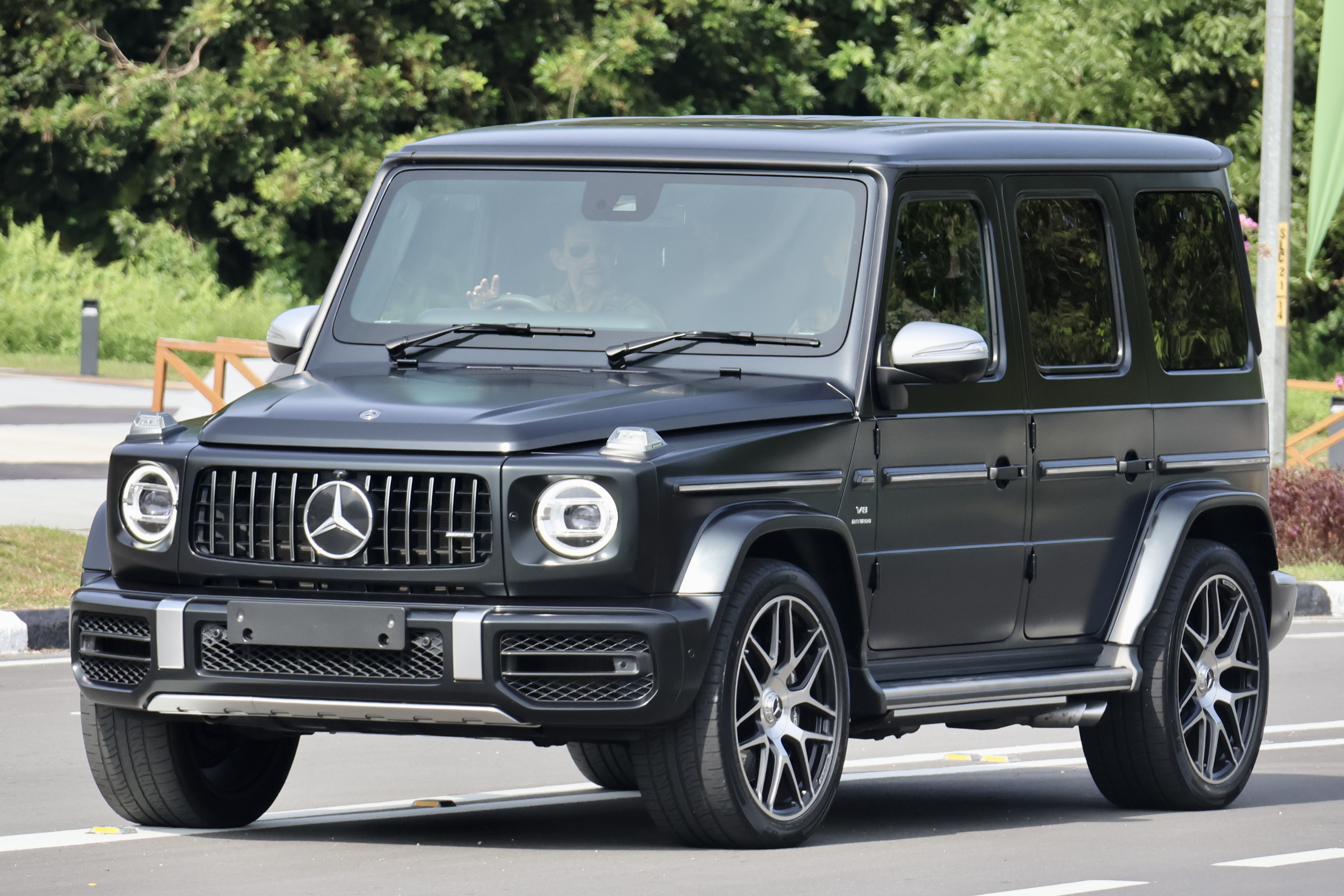
Sultan Hassanal Bolkiah driving his Mercedes-Benz G63 AMG in 2024

The car collection of the Sultan of Brunei is the largest private car collection in the world, consisting of approximately 7,000 cars, which have an estimated combined value over US$5 billion. Within his collection of cars, the Sultan's collection of Ferrari F40s, McLaren F1s, and Rolls-Royce vehicles are particularly notable due to the rarity of the vehicles and their value. Brunei holds the Guinness World Record for the largest private Rolls-Royce collection, with around 150 cars, while the Sultan and his brother, Prince Jefri Bolkiah, are said to own an additional 1,998 luxury vehicles.

== Ownerships ==
The vast automobile collection that is frequently credited to Hassanal Bolkiah, 29th Sultan of Brunei, really belonged to Prince Jefri Bolkiah, his third brother. Up until 1997, Prince Jefri oversaw Brunei's oil and gas earnings through the Brunei Investment Agency (BIA) and his investment company, Amedeo Development Corporation. Oil prices crashed in 1997 amid the Asian financial crisis, and an audit found Prince Jefri had embezzled $14.8 billion, which caused Amadeo to fail under $10 billion in debt. Prince Jefri relinquished a large number of assets, including more than 2,000 automobiles, 500 homes, yachts, planes, and pricey purchases from Asprey, Ferrari, and Rolls-Royce, as part of a 2000 deal with the Bruneian government.

Prince Jefri and his oldest son, Pengiran Muda Abdul Hakeem, amassed a collection of over 3,500 cars by the end of the 1990s. Additionally, Crown Prince Al-Muhtadee Billah owned several luxurious sports cars, including a Pagani Huayra, Ferrari 599 GTB, Mercedes McLaren SLR, and Lamborghini Murciélago LP640.

== Collection ==
The vehicle collection is held within a sizeable property guarded by a tall razor-wire-topped wall and a front gate that can withstand bombs. Visitors are required to give up their passports and photos upon arrival, and they must remain with a guide. German Shepherds and armed Gurkhas guard the area. The property is made up of eight two-story structures, each measuring around 250 feet (76 m) in length and 60 feet in width. There are roughly 120 automobiles each level.

The first structure is devoted to Porsches from the 959 to the late 1990s models, and each floor has a different theme. There are black-on-black 1996–1997 Mercedes-Benz 500 automobiles on another floor. Aston Martins, Rolls-Royces, Bentleys, and 1990s Ferraris, among which are many 456s and 550s, as well as experimental XTRAC automatic transmissions are among the vehicles housed in other buildings. A small number of 550s have been fitted with infrared cameras for night driving and coated in matte black finishes that reflect radar, which is rather sophisticated technology for the late 1990s. Rows of right-hand drive TestaRossas (TR), 512 TRs, and 512 Ms are shown on another floor. Coachbuilt Ferraris are housed in a different building and include five F90s, five FXs, three Mythos, four 456 four-doors, four 456 Venice Cabriolets, and four 456 Venice station wagons. Serial number 7795 of a right-hand-drive 275 GTS is the unique Ferrari from the Enzo period.

A shop with glass walls that held three McLaren F1s, a 288 GTO Evo, an F50, and an F40 LM was situated in between the eight enormous buildings. The F40 LM included power windows, air conditioning, red piping, black leather interior, and black exterior trim. The building's air conditioning was turned off, so the showroom, which was extremely hot, effectively functioned as a greenhouse. Under the structure was a windowless theater crammed with rows of exotic cars, including 288 GTOs and right-hand drive F40s.

A corrugated tin roof partially protected the two long, two-story buildings in the back of the property from the sun, but not from the rain. They were spaced apart by about fifty feet. About 300 black 1995–1997 Mercedes-Benz SELs and SLs were parked in the shade, many with their windows down, to rot in the severe tropical climate. These unique collector cars, which included several AMG specials with huge engines, wood or carbon fibre-trimmed interiors, and subjected to tropical heat, monsoon winds, and rain, eventually deteriorated. This forgotten assemblage was called "the reef," as it appeared they would be most useful as a man-made reef in the ocean.

A suitable roof provided superior protection for a late-1990s Rolls-Royce convertible that was parked next to the Mercedes-Benz fleet but its interior has similarly deteriorated as the leather wrap was hanging loosely from the steel rim, the heat had melted the foam cushioning of the steering wheel onto the driver's seat, and the rest of the inside has been covered in mold. A single-story structure adjacent held about sixty distinct automobiles, most of them were brilliant yellow. Twelve late-model Lamborghinis, such as the Countach and Diablo SE30, and four-wheel-drive Bentley station wagons, such as the Turbo R Val-d'Isère and Sports Estate, were part of this collection.

Here were also kept a few non-yellow cars, such as a black 456 Venice wagon with side windows that reflected. Exotic motorbikes lined one side room, and hundreds of empty Patek Philippe, Cartier, and Rolex watch boxes occupied another. A line of "lesser" automobiles, including a single Corvette, stood behind one of the buildings; they were all worn out from the heat and rain. In 1998, technicians abandoned the collection, leaving none of the cars in operable condition. Once the biggest collection of coachbuilt and luxury exotic cars in the world, it was now a car cemetery watched over solely by a few Gurkhas and dogs.

== Bentley collection ==
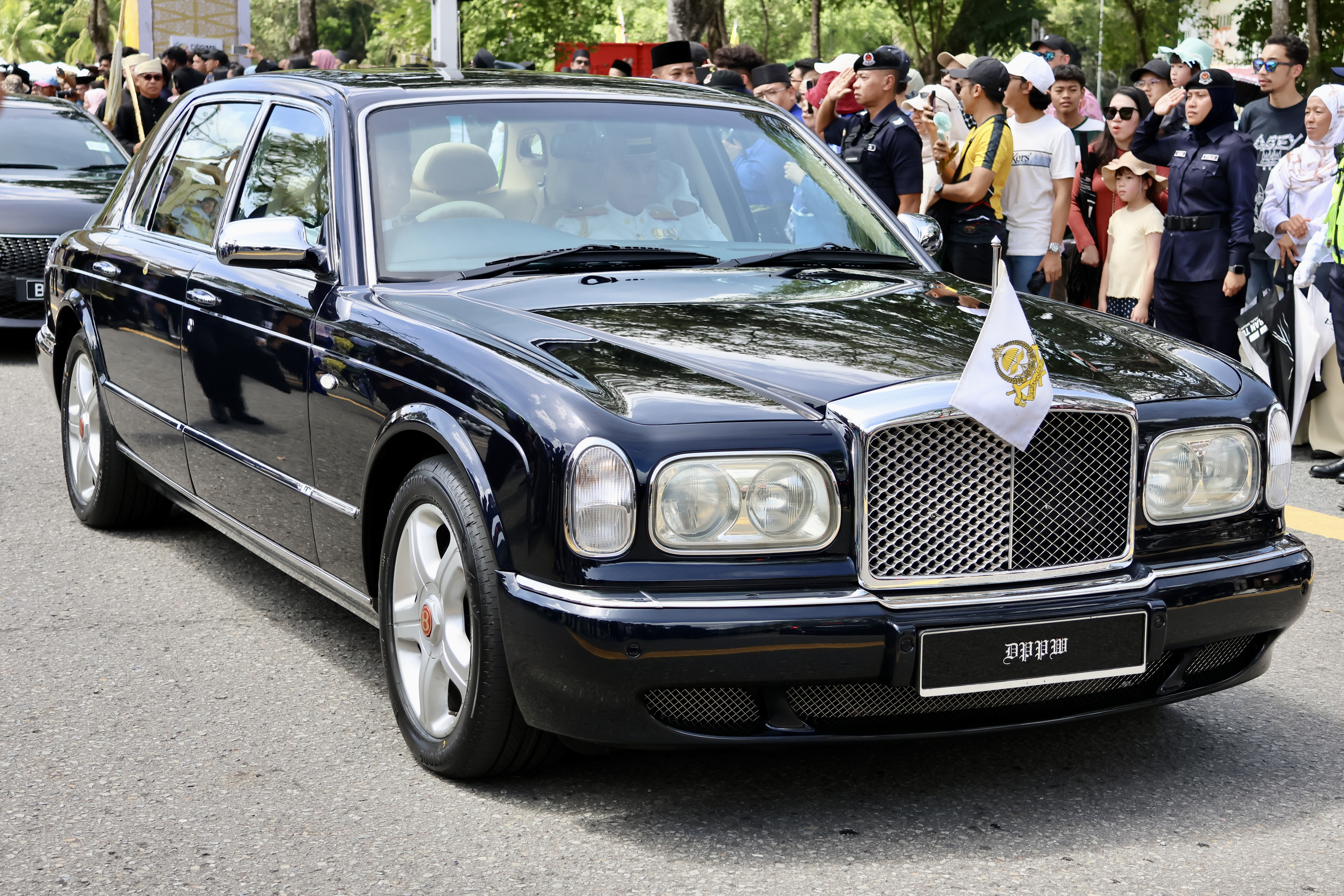
Arnage used by Prince Mohamed Bolkiah in 2024

By the end of the 1990s, Prince Jefri and Pengiran Muda Abdul Hakeem had accumulated more than 650 Bentleys, a rather high amount for the Crewe plant of Rolls-Royce. Because the orders were so rare and distinctive, the Mulliner Park Ward division of Rolls-Royce established a dedicated "Blackpool team" to create, develop, and test the customised vehicles. Known by names like Dominator, Phoenix, and Camelot, these Bentleys featured production copies of the Java concept vehicle, four-wheel-drive cars, and customised versions of the Continental R coupe. The majority of these uncommon automobiles are kept in air-conditioned warehouses in Brunei, under the constant watch of Gurkha troops, and are never seen in the open.

The Dominator, similar to an early Bentayga and Bentley's first attempt at an SUV, was an unconventional vehicle for the 1990s, resembling a 1990s Range Rover with Bentley styling and priced at $4 million each, with the Sultan purchasing three; all of which are extremely rare. (Note: The Bentley Dominator is a luxury SUV produced specifically for the Sultan of Brunei in 1996. Six Bentley Dominators were constructed for the Sultan with an approximated cost of US$4.6 million per vehicle.) At £146,094, the Continental R, which made its debut at the 1991 Geneva Motor Show, surpassed the next most expensive Bentley by £22,000 to become the most expensive vehicle in the world. The Sultan of Brunei bought the first bright red show model while it was still on display, which launched the country's sizeable market for the vehicle, including customised models such as four-door saloons, estates and convertibles.

While retaining the front-end styling of the Continental R, included models that were completely reskinned with names ranging from the simple B2 and B3 to the more imaginative Imperial, Spectre, Monte Carlo, Grand Prix, and Buccaneer. The B2 was a reskinned Bentley Continental R with an estimated total of 17 units, built exclusively for Brunei. Like the previously mentioned, the B3 was designed by Pininfarina; built in 1994 to 1995, the Sultan acquired about a dozen of these special models, each featuring a 6.75-litre V8 with a Garrett turbocharger. The vintage 2-door, 2+2 sports coupe known as the Buccaneer, powered by a 6.75-liter turbocharged V8, was developed specifically for Brunei and designed by GMD (Geoff Matthews Design) of Coventry, with production by FD (France Design) of Le Pin, France. In 1994, the Sultan and his brother commissioned the Grand Prix, a bespoke V8-powered Bentley with an aluminium body and a top speed of 305 km/h, notable for its unique feature: the letter "H" on the fifth position of the chassis number, signifying it as a non-standard model for select customers like the Brunei royal family. Additionally, Prince Jefri commissioned Continental R, with design contributions from Robin Page.

== Bugatti collection ==
The Bugatti EB 110 is a rear mid-engine sports car manufactured from 1991 to 1995. The royal family ordered a "few" EB 110s for the collection, including four EB 110 SS models with the respective production codes of 01, 02, 03, 13. SS01 was sold in the UK in the early 2000s. SS02, SS03 and SS13 are still in the royal family garages as of 2010, with one in a 1990s paint scheme.

== Ferrari collection ==
The Brunei royal family received the first three F50 vehicles when manufacture of the vehicle started in May 1995 as well as funding the development of the Ferrari F50 GT, with three of the cars intended for them. However, the program was canceled due to internal conflicts and regulatory concerns despite the significant investment. Named after Pengiran Muda Bahar, the Ferrari 550 with a hardtop and automatic gearbox suffered significant damage but was fully restored around 2014, and is the only 550 Bahar made and seen outside Brunei until sometime later where a low quality photo was taken and published showing the 550 Bahar being spotted at a traffic light in Brunei.

=== FX ===
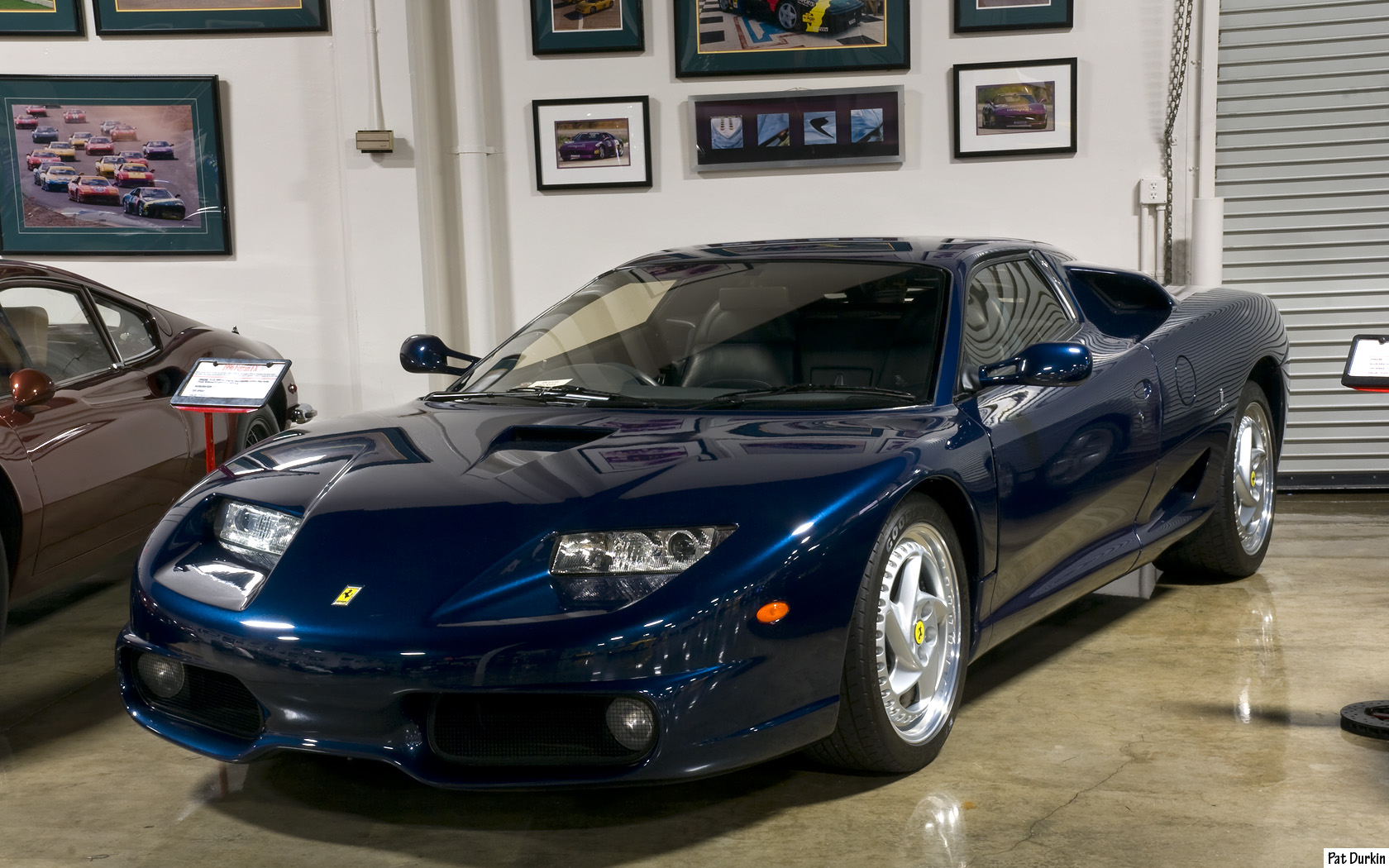
1996 Ferrari FX with blue exterior on display in Tustin 2008

A Ferrari FX, commissioned by the Brunei royal family, was originally a Ferrari F512M that was extensively modified into a unique vehicle with a body designed by Pininfarina and outfitted with a sequential paddle-shift gearbox by Williams. The FX, built in a series of seven, features an aluminum and carbon fiber body, upgraded cooling system, and a distinctive two-tone interior. While he intended to keep the FX hidden as part of his vast collection, details of the car leaked, causing excitement among enthusiasts. One of the FX models, a dark blue example (#103396), was equipped with a Williams Racing paddle shift gearbox that was operated by hydraulics. However, it was not delivered to Brunei and was later purchased by collector Dick Marconi for his museum in the Marconi Automotive Museum, Southern California.

=== F90 ===
The F90 was developed as a result of Prince Jefri's 1988 order to Pininfarina to design a very rare and distinctive supercar based on the Testarossa chassis. The prince became a top client for Pininfarina after placing an order for six vehicles, having initially ordered just one. The prince insisted on starting again with a fresh design even though he had nearly finished the Mythos. In 2002, the outcome of this unique assignment was made public when a picture of a red F90, one of the prince's collection of automobiles, was posted online.

=== 456 Night Vision/Venice series ===
Two of the Ferrari 456 cars in the royal family's collection have night vision, demonstrating cutting-edge technology that is rarely found in mass-produced automobiles. Aside from the Night Vision examples, there came the exclusive 456 Venice series which involved versions of the 456 GTs in estate, saloon and convertible form in which 7 estates and at least 6 saloons and 6 estates were made as well as special wheels made specifically for the Venice series. They came in red, yellow, black, forest/emerald green, silver, and even titanium which is only seen on one of the 456 Venice estates, some of which are only seen in the collection and others, like the forest green, silver and black Venice estates, the forest green Venice convertible and the silver Venice saloon, which have occasionally been seen outside with the black Venice estate being the most recent. Collectively, these automobiles illustrate the era's focus on custom coachbuilding as well as the royal family's penchant for unique and avant-garde car designs.

=== 288 GTO Evoluzione ===
The Ferrari 288 GTO Evoluzione is one of the Ferraris in the collection. This car, which was officially one of six, was supposed to be Ferrari's entry in Group B rallying before the series was canceled because it was too fast, too lethal, and too uncontrollable. The one in the collection featured a built-in radio and was street-converted by Pininfarina.

=== F40 ===
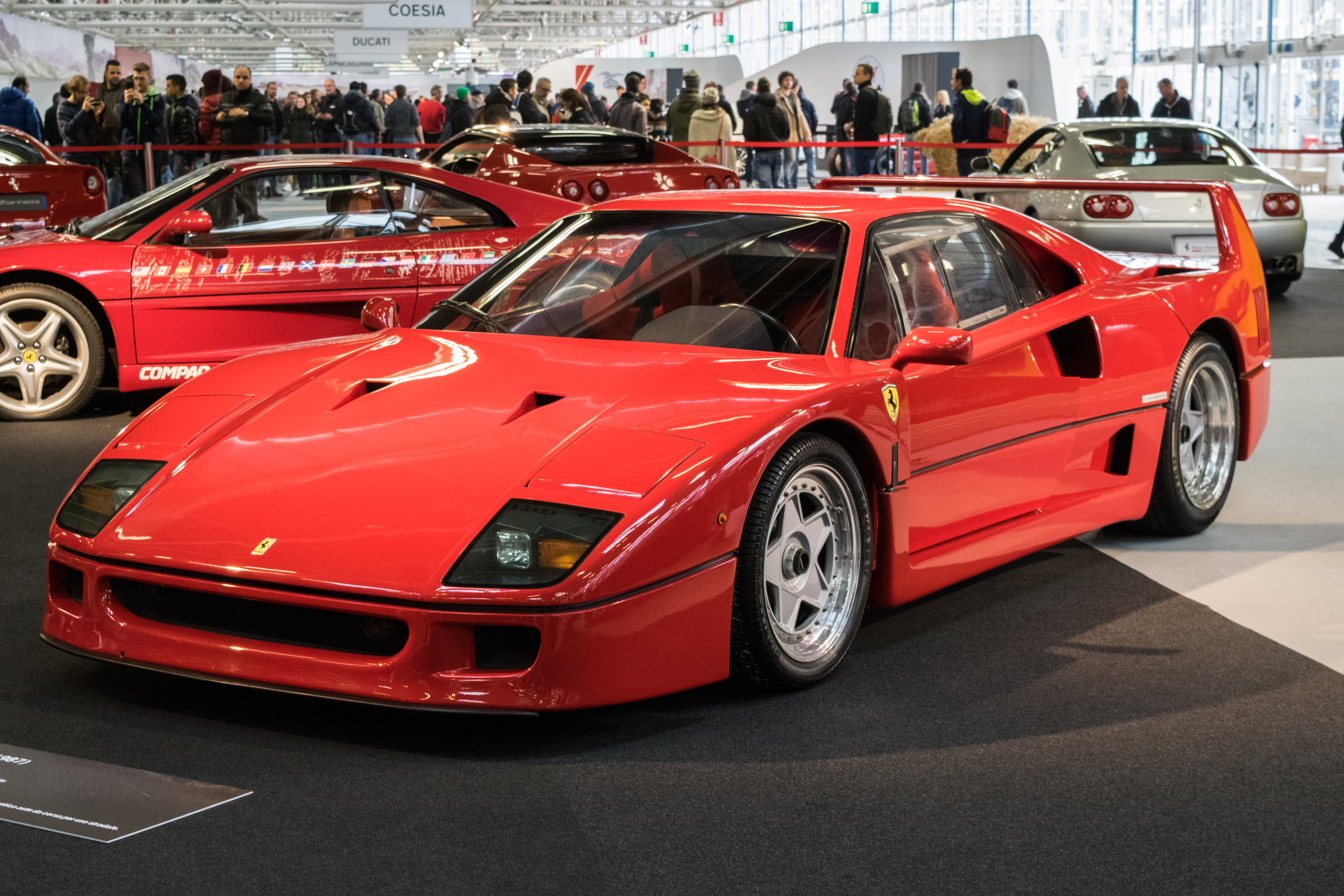
Ferrari F40 with rosso corsa exterior in Bologna 2014

The Ferrari F40 was a mid-engine sports car produced from 1987 to 1992 to celebrate Ferrari's 40th anniversary of the company's founding in 1947. Of the eleven known Ferrari F40s purchased by Prince Jefri, ten underwent cosmetic and performance modifications performed by Italian car designer firm Pininfarina, with nine of the cars being modified under the supervision of Paolo Garella, the Pininfarina Prototype Manager of the 1990s.

Under the supervision of Paolo Garella, Pininfarina modified nine Ferrari F40s for Prince Jefri, including seven road cars and two F40 LMs. The custom road cars were equipped with air-conditioning, a radio, electric windows, and a tilt-able steering wheel column, as per the Prince Jefri's requests. Additionally, Prince Jefri acquired two of the nineteen Michelotto F40 LMs produced by Ferrari.

Only three of the eleven Ferrari F40s have exchanged ownership from Prince Jefri. One of these cars was the original F40 LM purchased for Brunei in 1992 which has since gone through four separate owners before ultimately being purchased by Shinji Takei in 1996. The two other vehicles were the right hand drive converted yellow F40, and right hand drive converted matte grey F40, which were both purchased back from the Brunei royal family by John Collins, a Ferrari dealer who worked for Talacrest, a UK-based Ferrari specialist.

The matte grey Ferrari F40 was originally converted to rosso corsa with LM seats in the early 2000s but was restored to its matte grey exterior with a red stripe and retained its LM seats in 2018 by DK Engineering. Meanwhile, the yellow Ferrari F40 was restored to its original configuration with a rosso corsa exterior and red cloth interior, maintaining its right-hand drive setup. These two F40s are currently the only known right-hand drive F40s in public circulation.

== McLaren collection ==
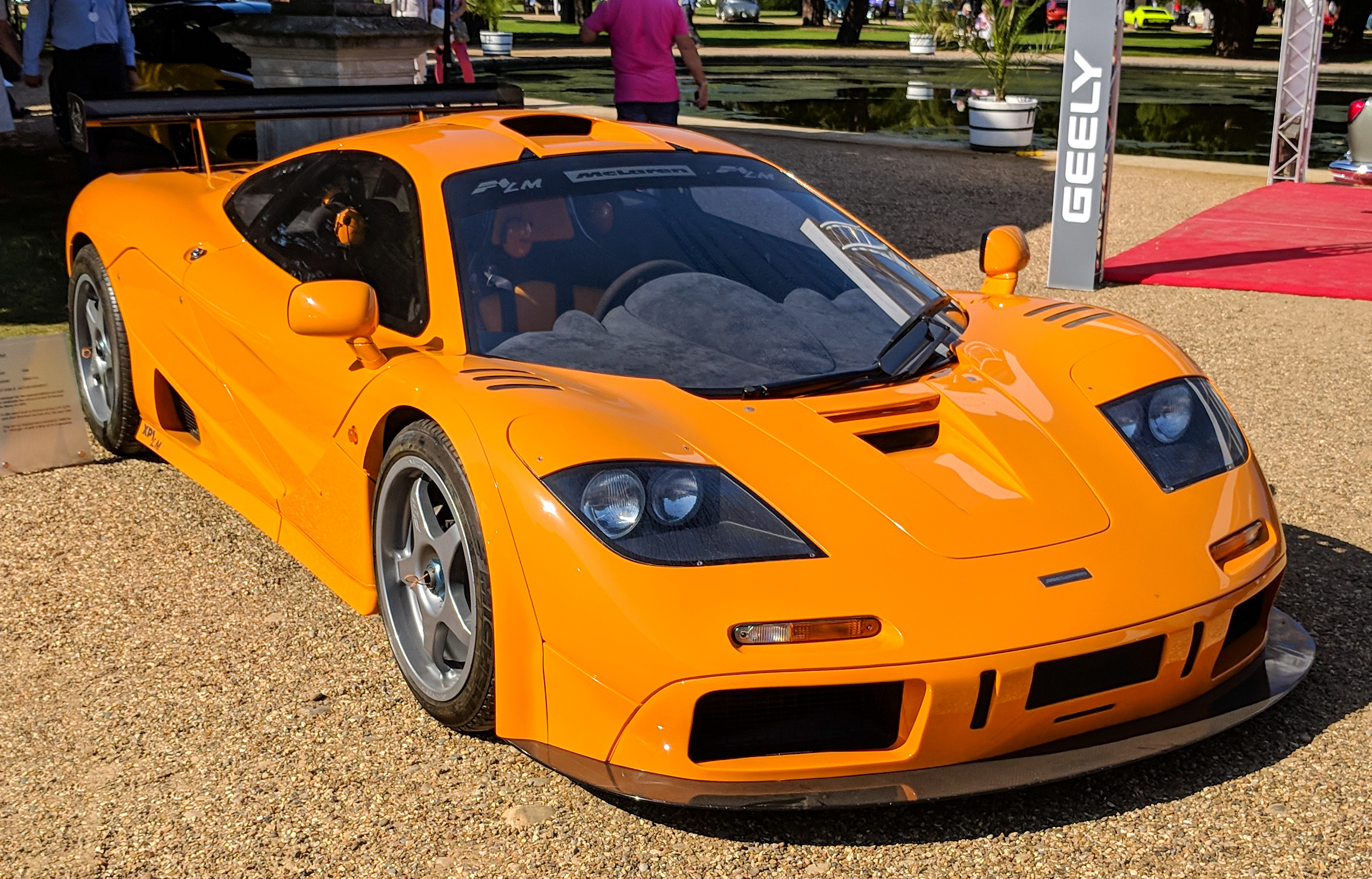
1995 McLaren F1 with orange exterior in London 2018

The McLaren F1 was a mid-engine sports car manufactured from 1992 to 1998, with a total of 106 cars being produced. Due to the extremely limited number of production, the cars are extremely rare and are valued north of US$20 Million. The Sultan of Brunei purchased ten of the 106 McLaren F1s produced, and these included five road cars, three F1 LMs, one F1 GT, and one F1 GTR. Despite Gordon Murray's desire for all F1 LMs to be completed in Historic Orange, out of all three F1 LMs first requested, two of them are done in a unique livery. The sultan still owns the lone LM of the two non-historic oranges. Since the heyday of the collection, only six Mclarens remain. One of the unique livery F1 LMs has been reported in the Sultan of Johor's collection, while one roadcar was wrecked and then scrapped. The F1 that was scrapped was chassis 004. This car was finished in Grand Prix red and during the test drive of chassis 004 by McLaren test drivers, the driver lost control and crashed on the Tutong highway. Some parts were used as spares while chassis 004 was sent to McLaren. Two F1 roadcars have been sold and are now located abroad.

== Rolls-Royce collection ==
As of 2011, the Sultan of Brunei holds the Guinness World Record for the largest private Rolls-Royce collection, with more than 500 Rolls-Royce vehicles.

=== Phantom VI ===
The Rolls-Royce Phantom VI was produced from 1968 to 1990, and was commonly used by the British monarchy. The Sultan of Brunei custom ordered four Silver Clouds, named the Rolls-Royce Cloudesque. The car was a modernised version of the Rolls-Royce Silver Cloud, produced from 1955 to 1966, having undergone engine modifications and transmission upgrades and in August 2026, one of the Cloudesques, a dark blue example, was spotted on the roads of Brunei and convoyed by a dark blue Rolls-Royce Phantom VI Landaulette.

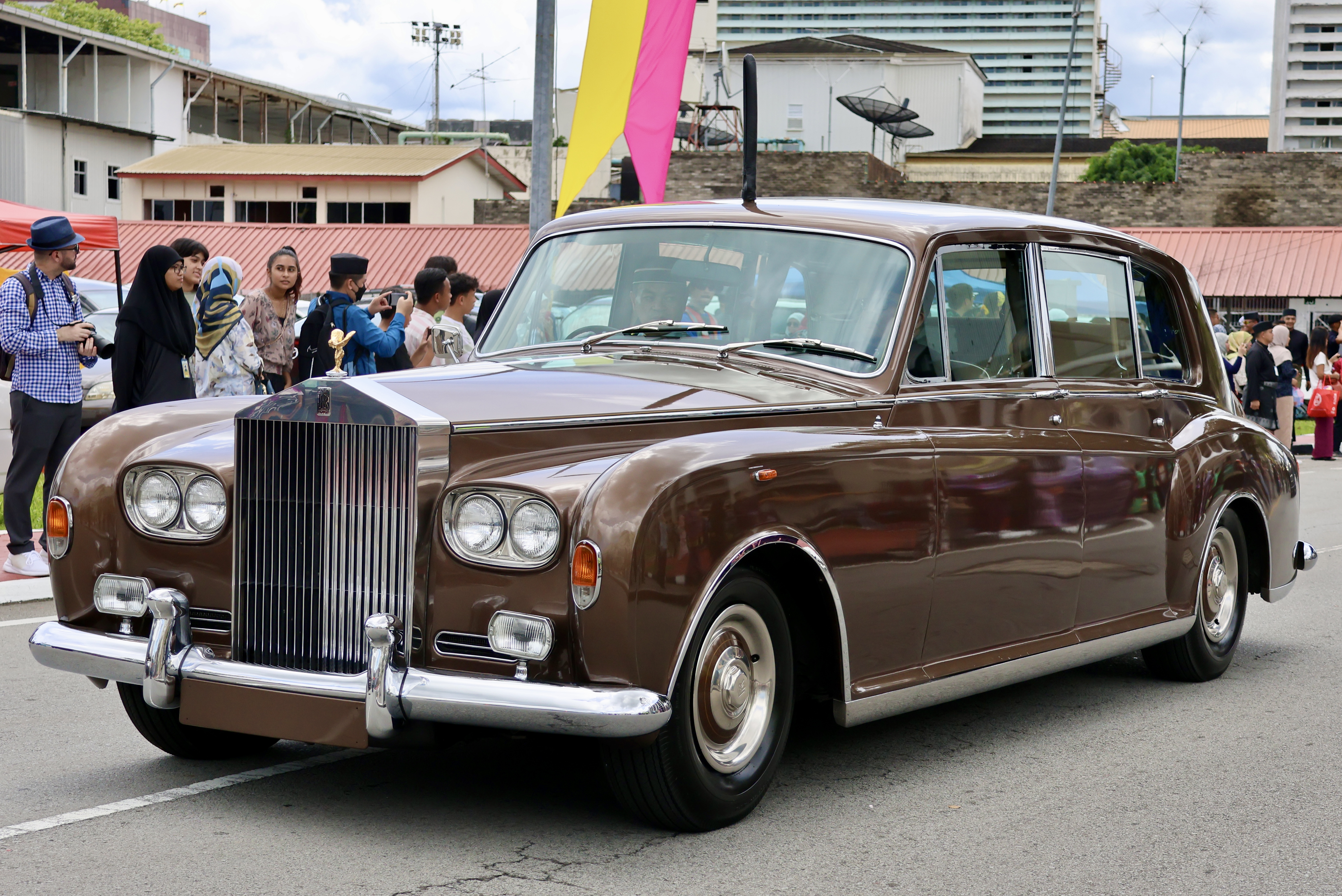
Brown Phantom VI in Pusat Bandar in 2024

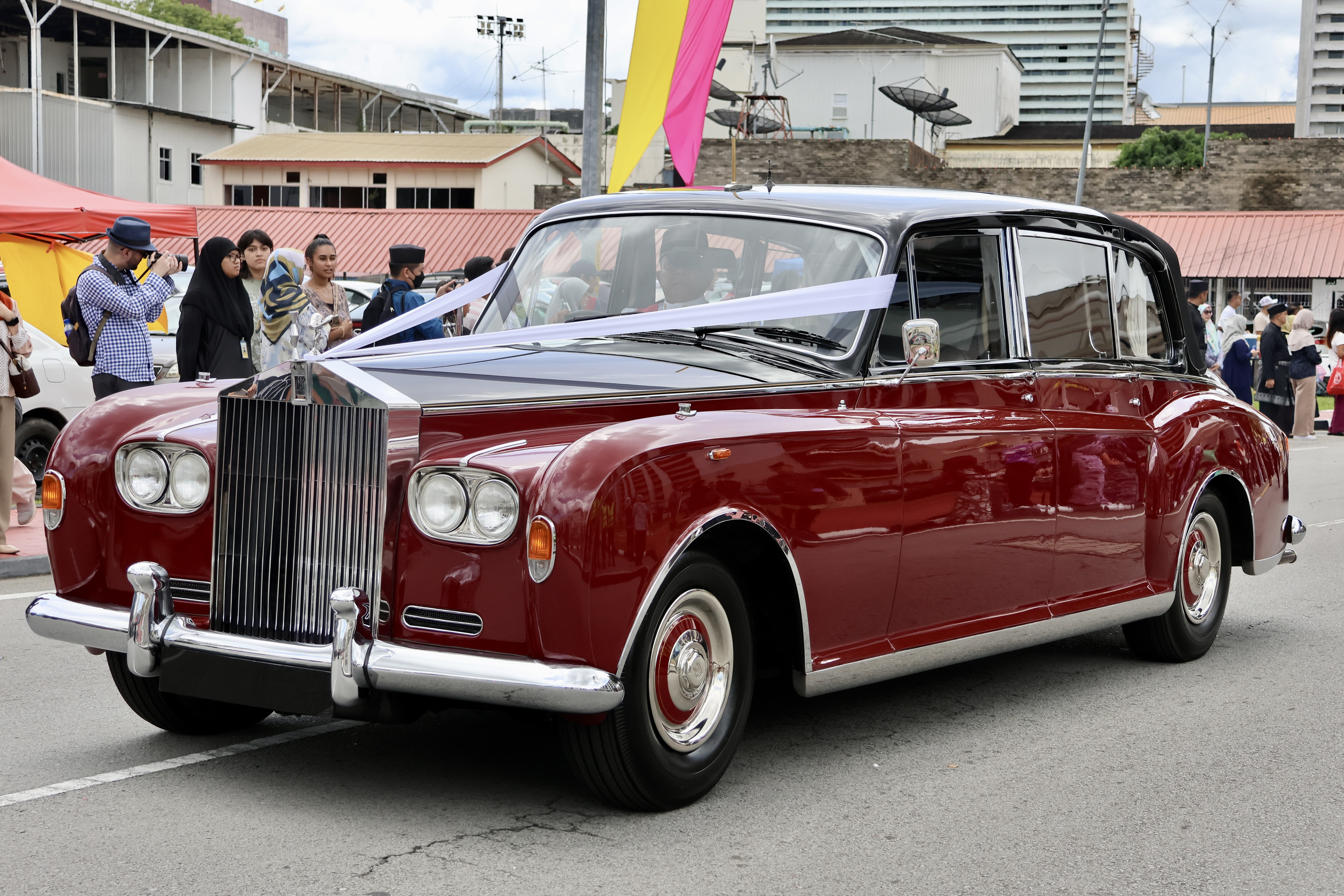
Maroon Phantom VI with wedding ribbons in Pusat Bandar in 2024

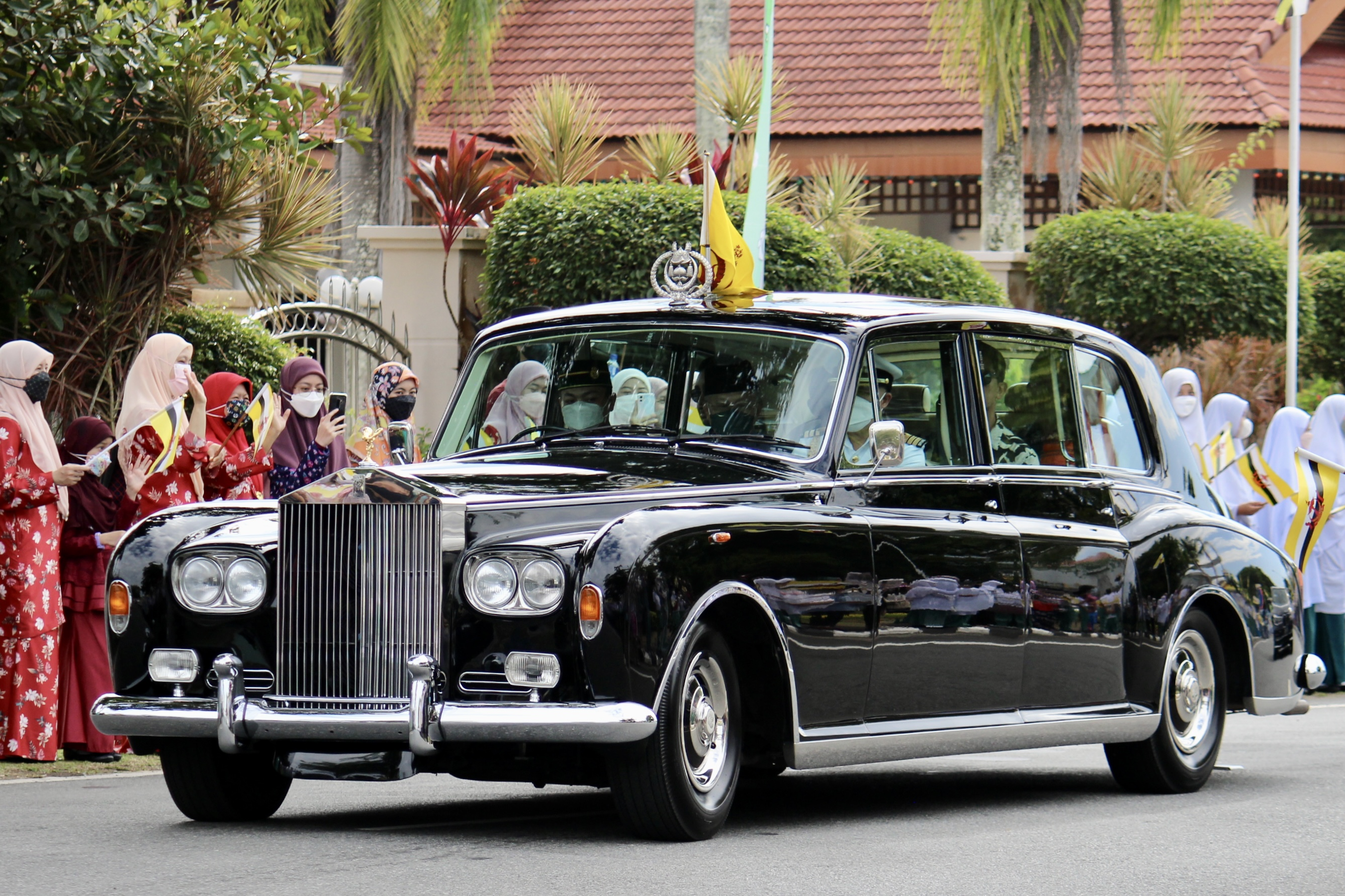
Black Phantom VI used by the Sultan in 2022

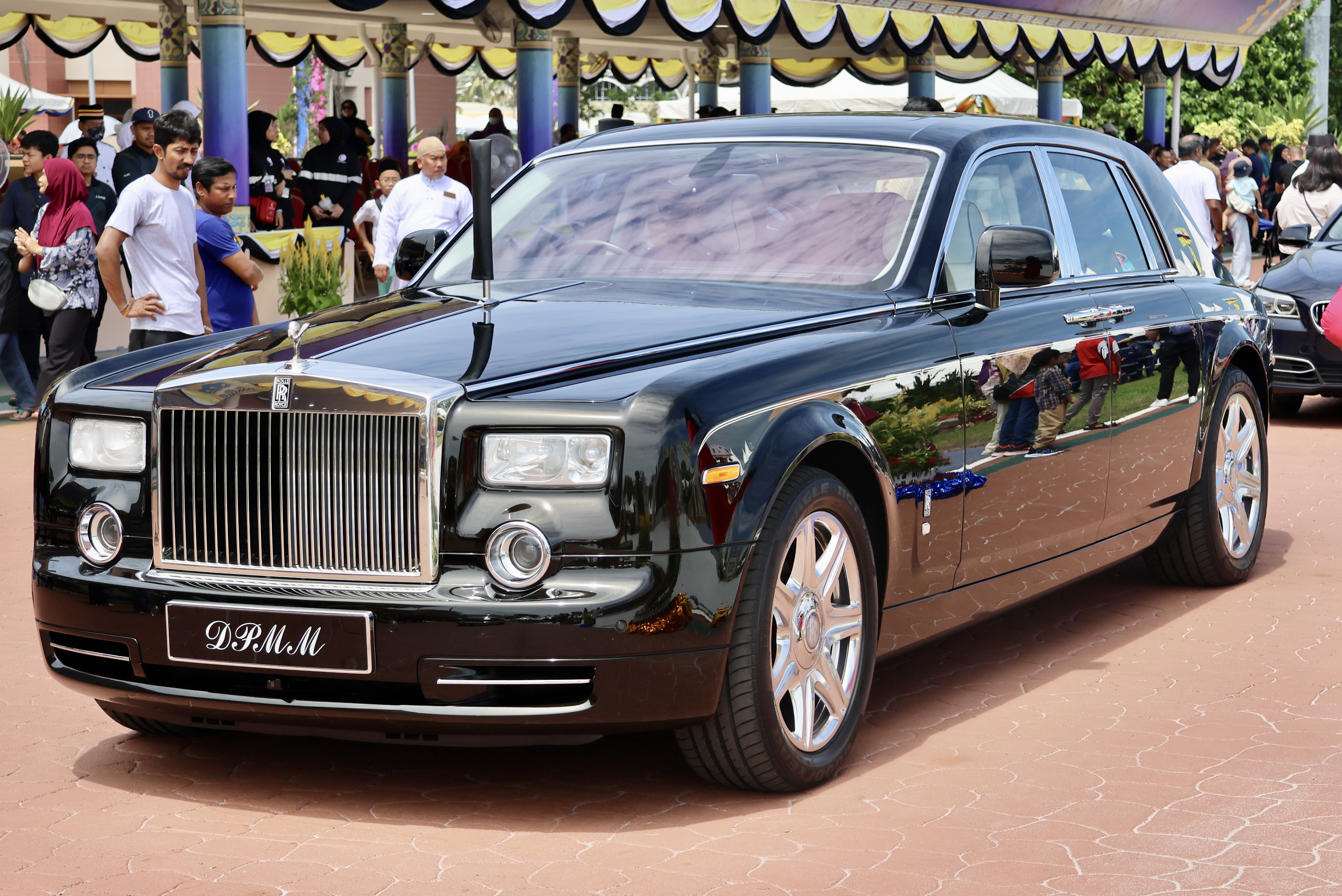
Phantom VII used by Prince Al-Muhtadee Billah in 2023

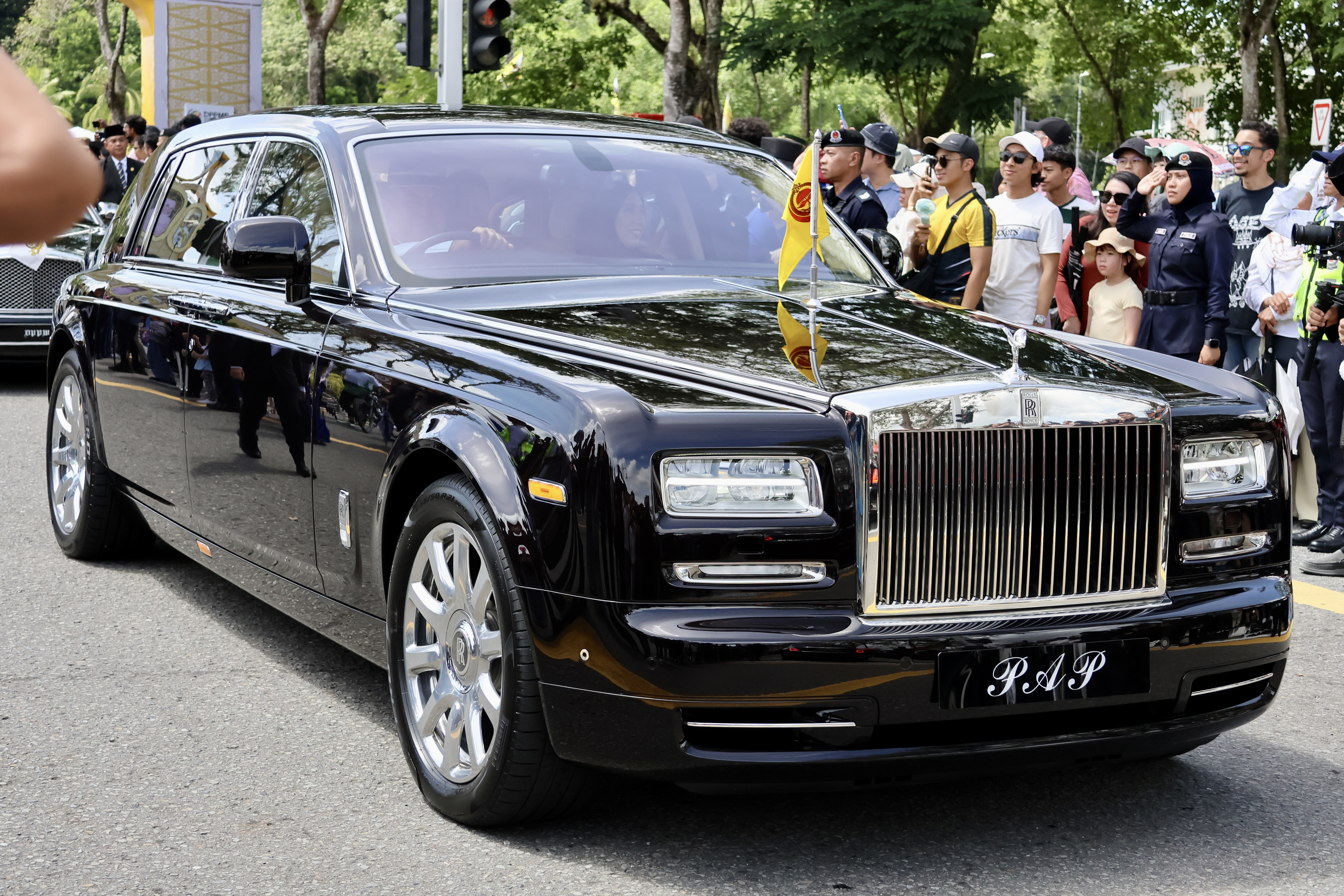
Phantom VII used by princesses in 2024

=== Silver Spur II ===
The Rolls-Royce Silver Spur II was a luxury limousine produced by Rolls-Royce from 1989 to 1993. One of the more famous Silver Spurs was a 6-door landaulette conversion done by either Robert Jankel or Hooper and featured a foldable seat in the back. It was mainly used as a wedding car and during the wedding of Pengiran Anak Abdul Rahim and Princess Rashidah of Brunei as well as the wedding of Al-Muhtadee Billah and Princess Sarah, it was plated with gold decorations and a canopy.

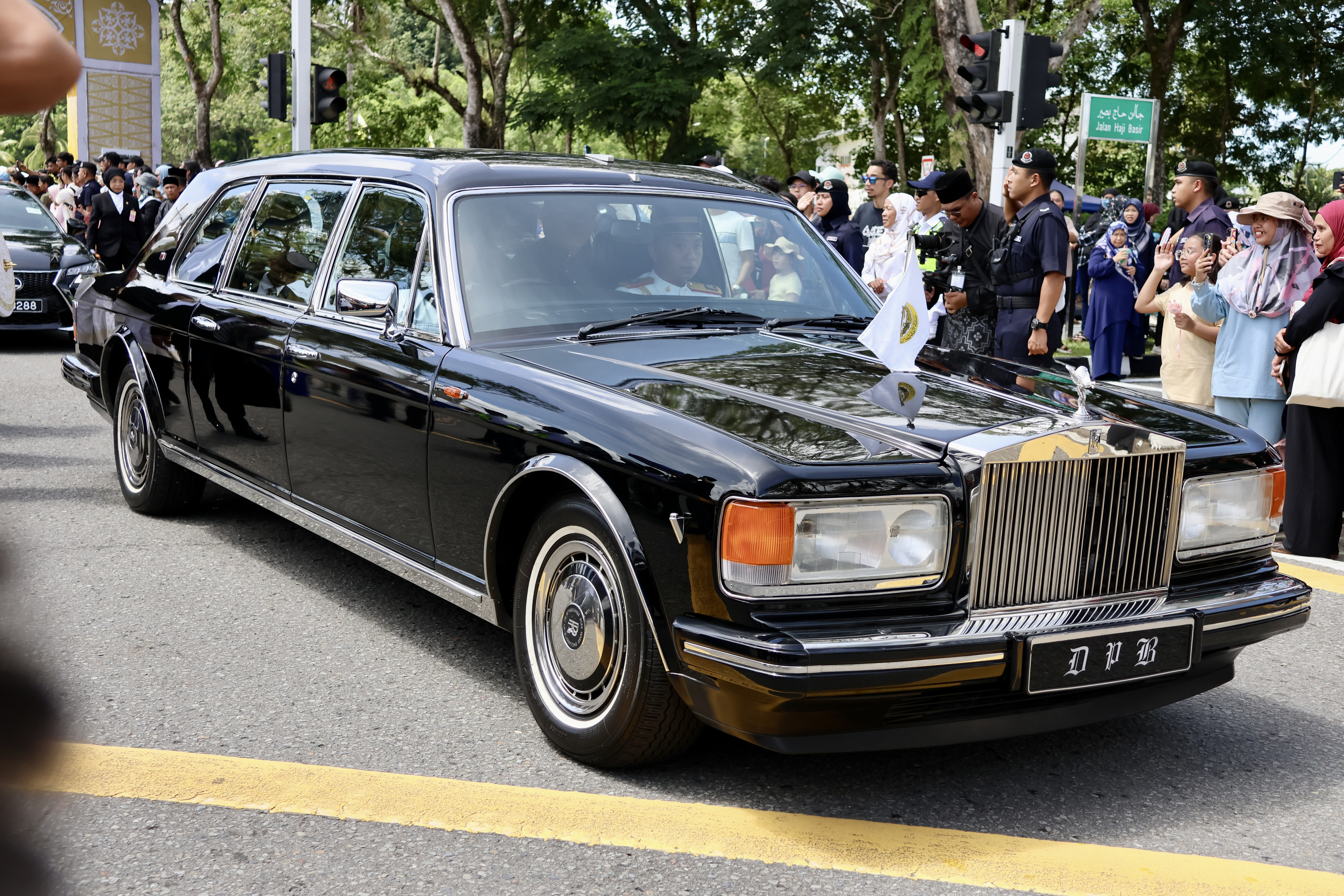
Silver Spur I used by Prince Sufri Bolkiah in 2024

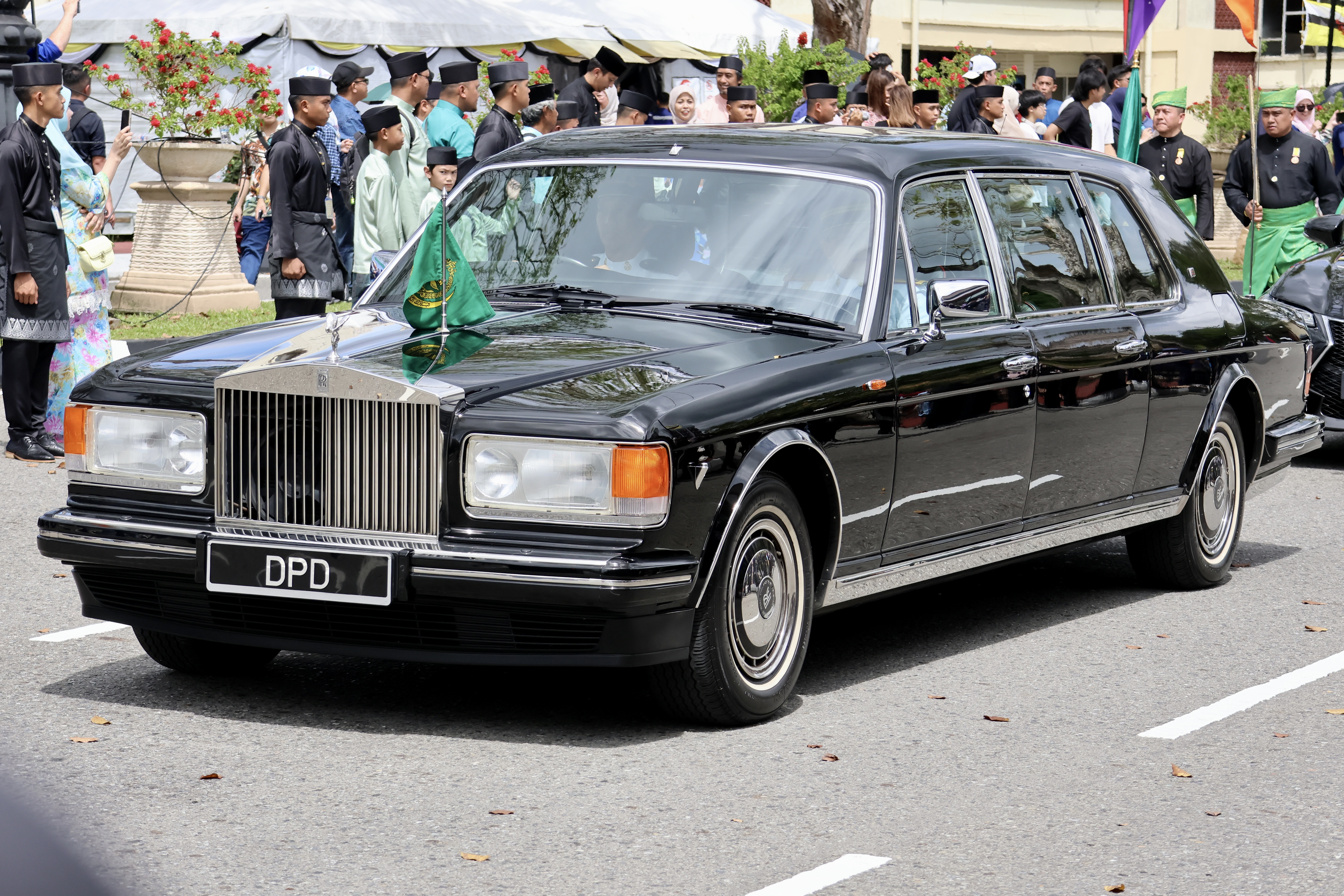
Silver Spur I in Pusat Bandar in 2024

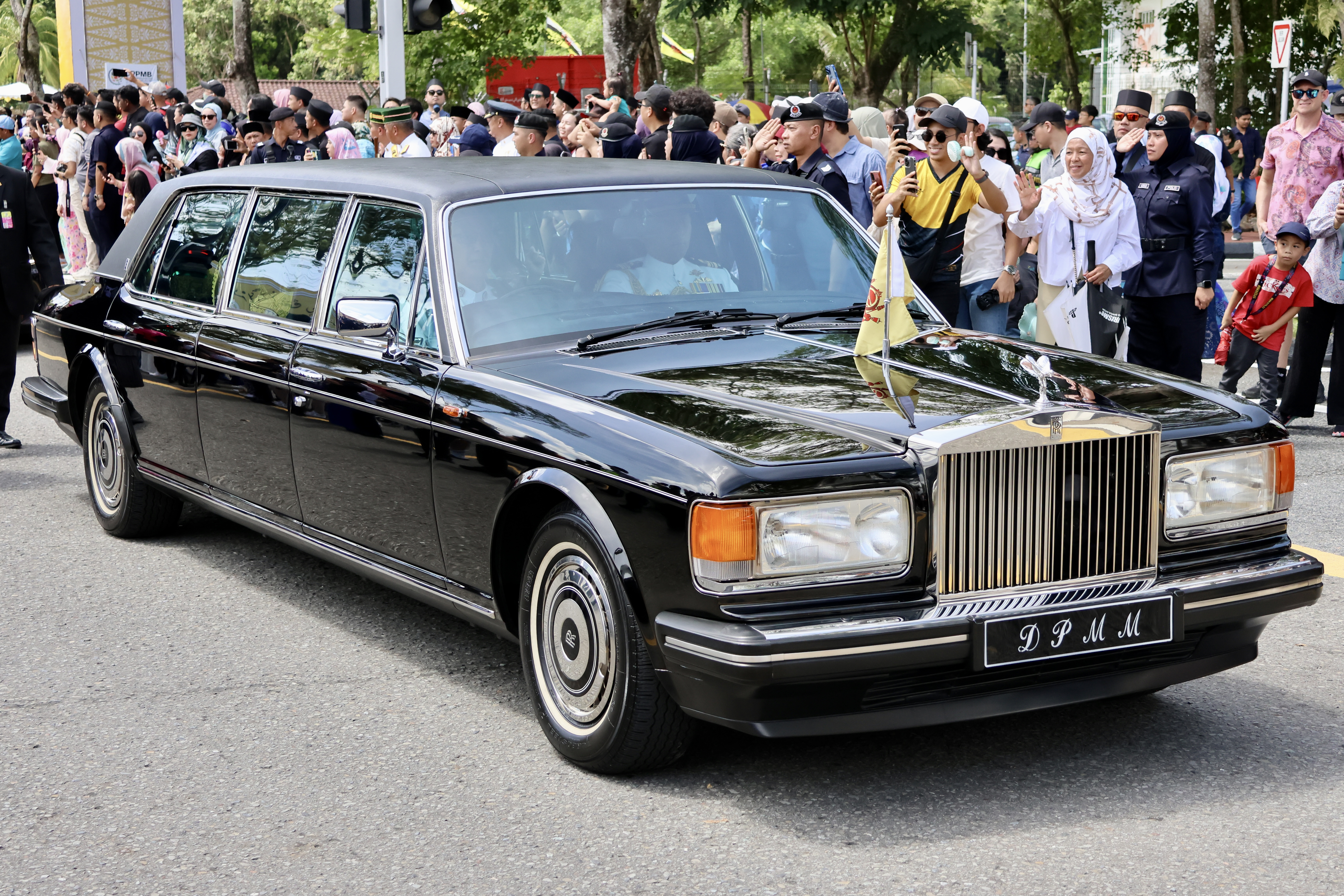
Silver Spur II used by Prince Al-Muhtadee Billah in 2024

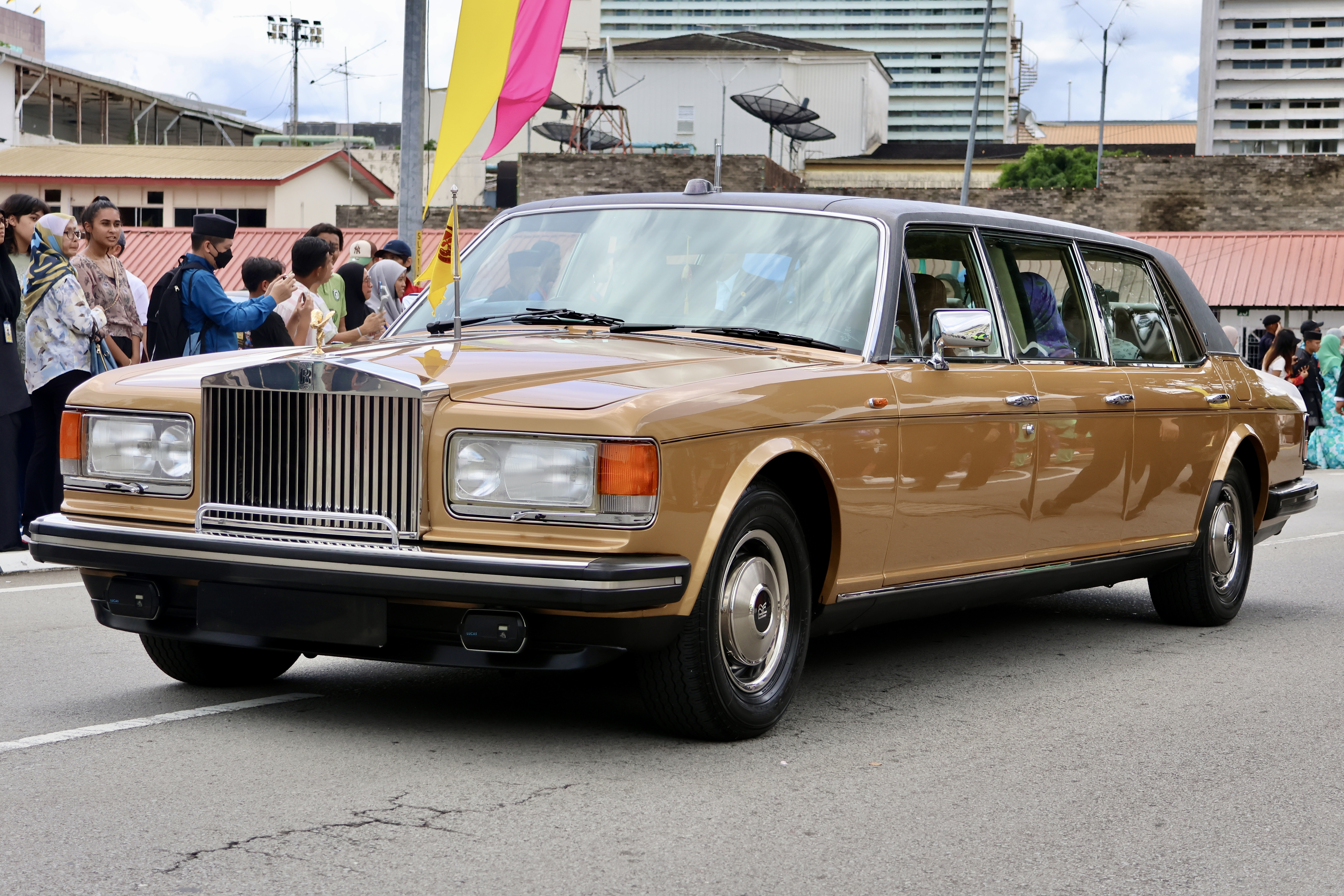
Silver Spur II used by princesses in 2024

== Other vehicles ==
- BMW Nazca M12 Concept - A concept sports car designed and built by Italdesign, similar to the C2. A black example was reportedly in the collection as of 2020, but it wasn't verified until 2024.
- GMT400 - Right-hand drive versions of the eighth-generation GMC Suburban were made for Prince Jefri, featuring Pininfarina insignia and were equipped with varying bodykits and special interior designs that were done by Stillen. They were mostly painted in black except for one that featured a camoflauged appearance. 14 were made and as of now, only 3 examples had already left the collection but are still residing in Brunei.
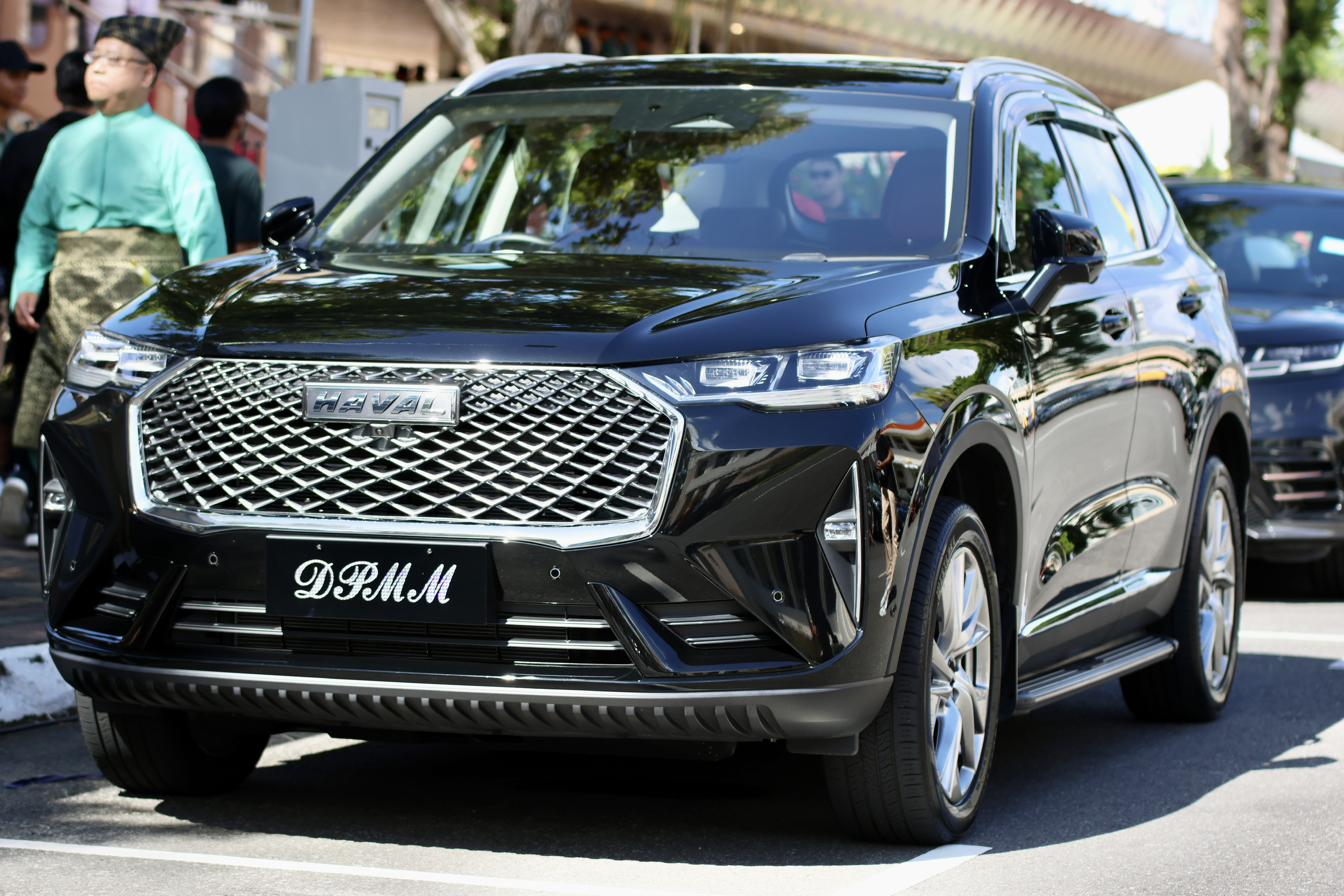
Prince Al-Muhtadee Billah's Haval H6 in 2023

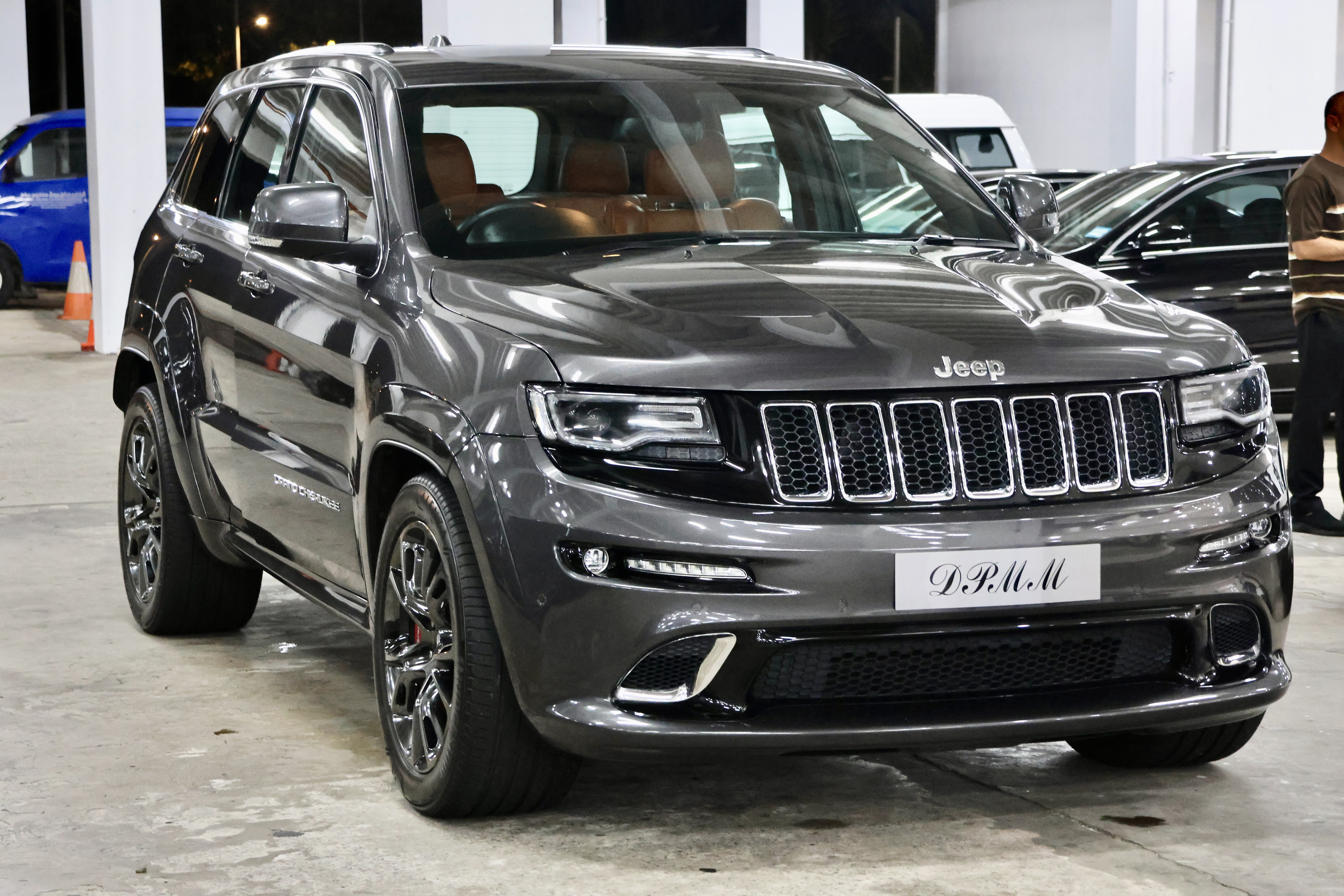
Prince Al-Muhtadee Billah's Jeep Grand Cherokee in 2024

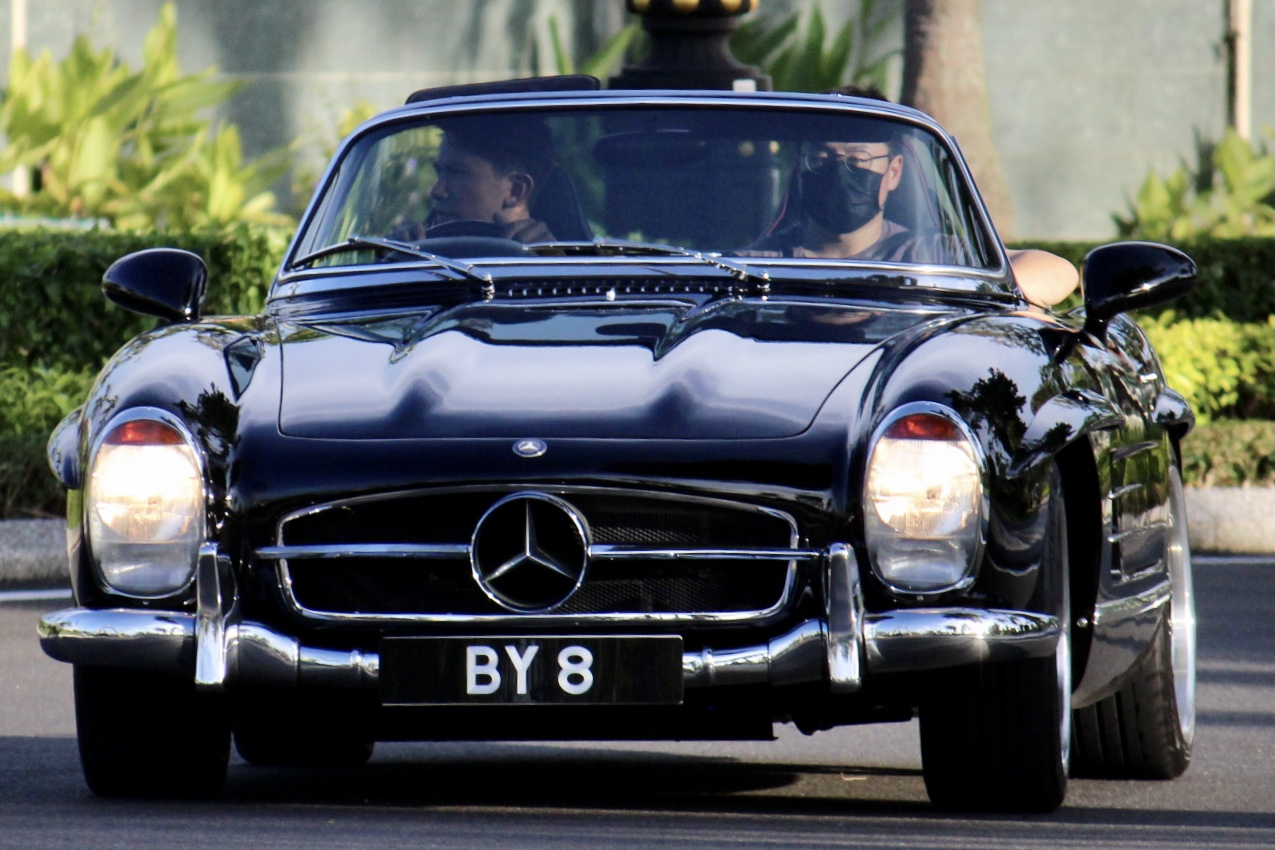
Prince Abdul Mateen's Mercedes-Benz 300 SL in 2022

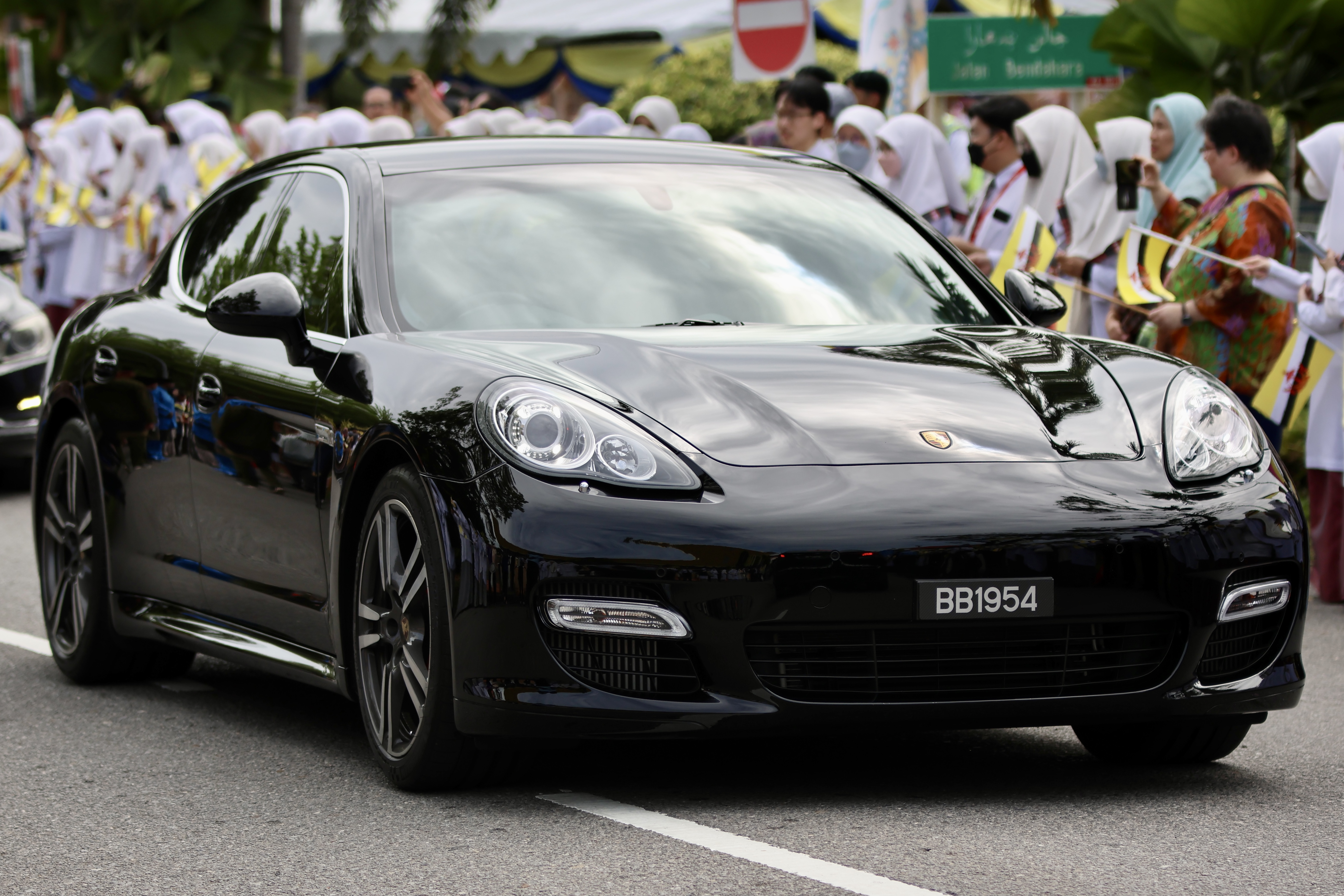
Prince Jefri's Porsche Panamera in 2023

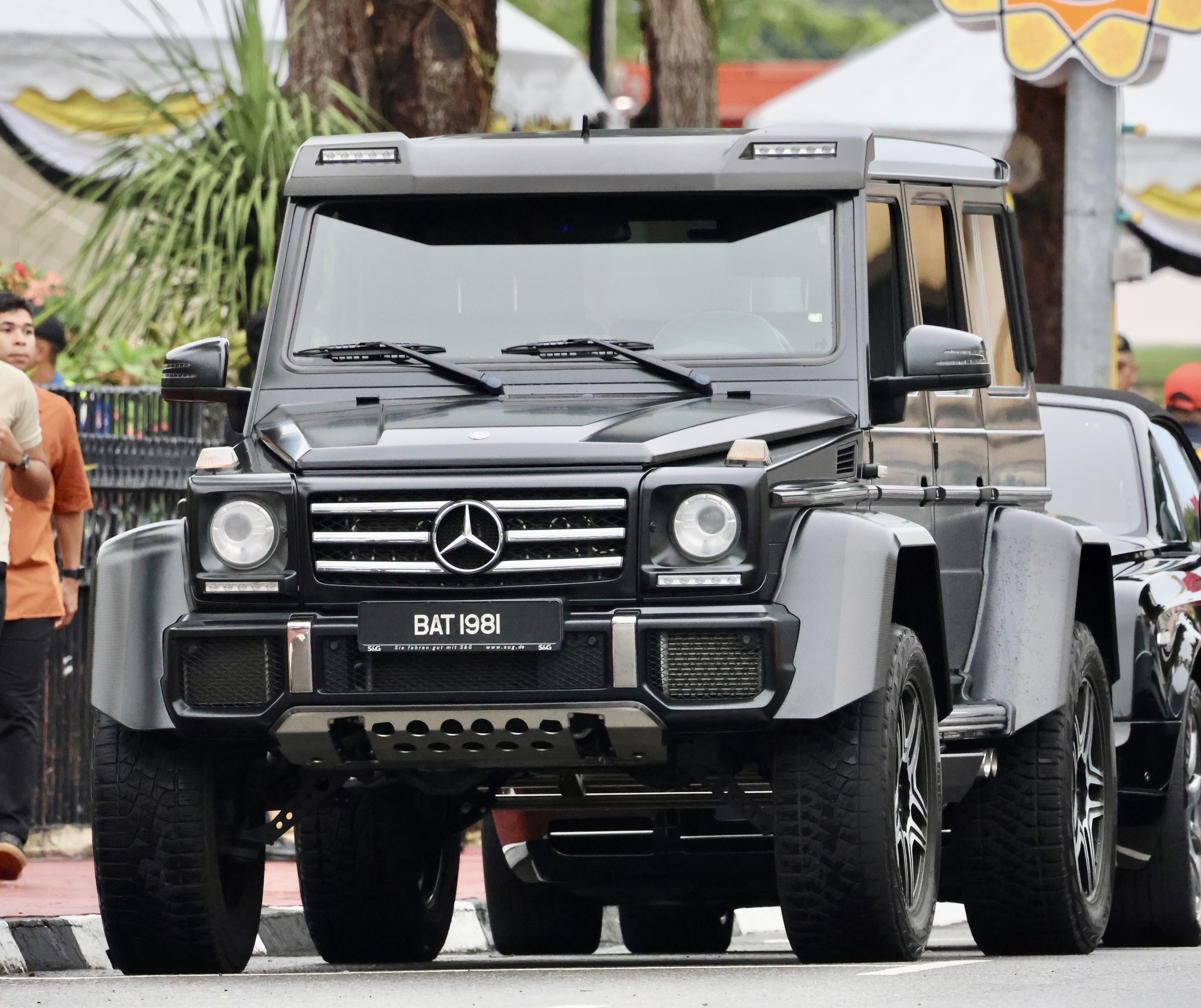
Pengiran Muda Bahar's Mercedes-Benz G500 4×4² in 2024

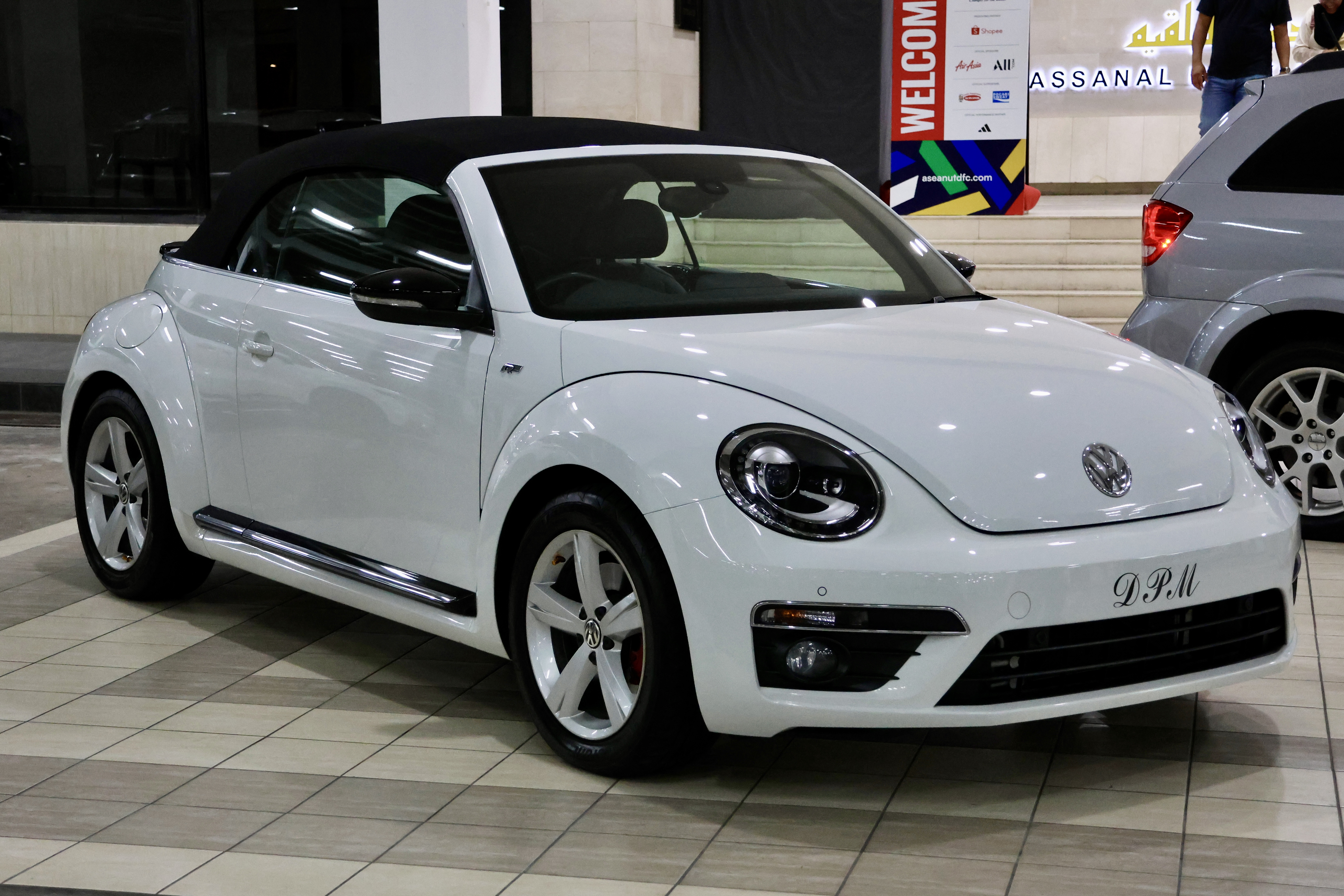
Prince Abdul Malik's Volkswagen Beetle Cabrio in 2024
