= Hussain Mohammad Yusof =

Bruneian politician (1933–2012)

Yang Dimuliakan Lagi Dihormati Pehin Orang Kaya Digadong Seri Lela Dato Seri Paduka Hussain Mohammad Yusof SPMB DSNB PHBS PJK
- حسين محمد يوسف
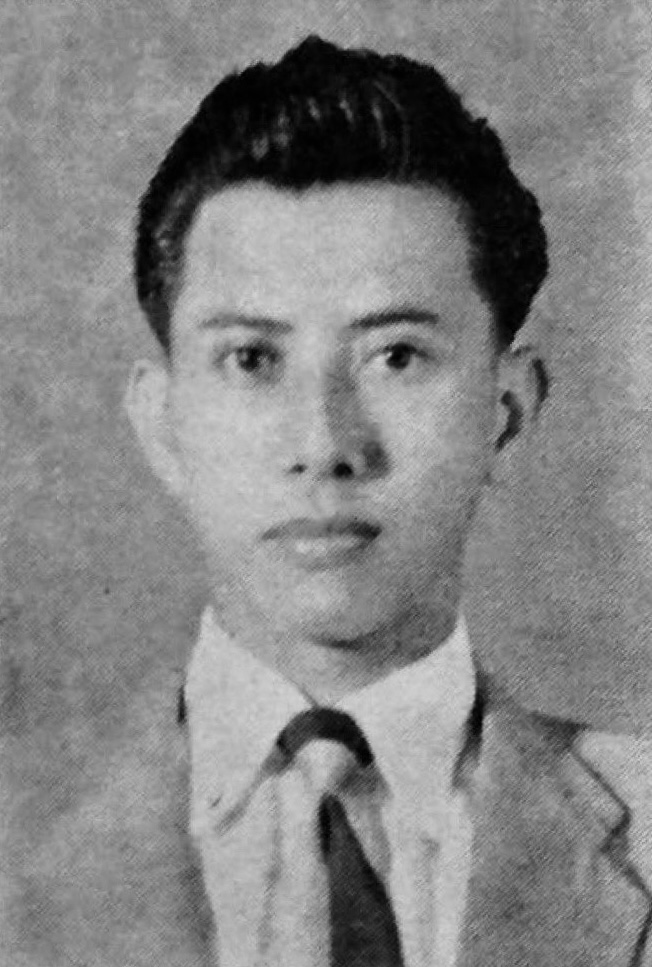
- Portrait of Hussain in c. 1959

2nd Minister of Culture, Youth and Sports
- In office 20 October 1986 – 24 May 2005
- Monarch: Hassanal Bolkiah
- Deputy: Ali Mohammad Daud; Selamat Munap
- Preceded by: Jefri Bolkiah
- Succeeded by: Mohammad Daud

Personal details
- Born: 27 July 1933 Kampong Ujong Tanjong, Kampong Ayer, Brunei
- Died: 3 December 2012 (aged 79) Muara, Brunei-Muara, Brunei
- Parent: Yusof Husain (father)
- Education: Devonshire College
- Profession: Politician; civil servant
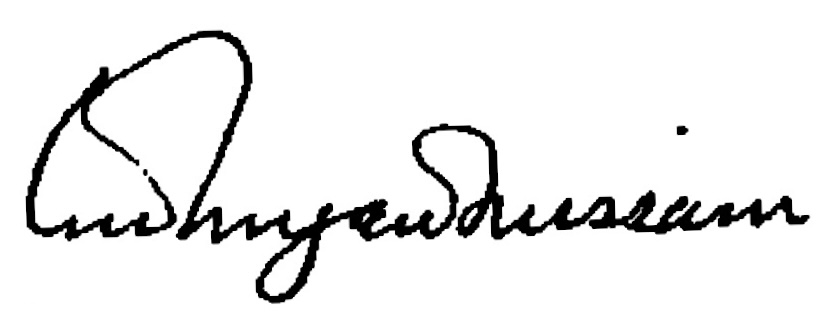
- Signature

Hussain bin Haji Mohammad Yusof (27 July 1933 – December 2012), sometimes spelled Hussein, was a Bruneian aristocrat and politician who held the position of Minister of Culture, Youth and Sports (MCYS) from 1986 to 2005. Notably, he had also served on the Adat Istiadat Council, the Council of Succession, the Council of Cabinet Ministers, and the Privy Council.

== Early life and education ==
Hussain was born on 27 July 1933, at Kampong Ayer's Kampong Ujong Tanjong. He was the son of the nobleman Pehin Orang Kaya Digadong Seri Diraja Dato Laila Utama Haji Awang Mohammad Yusof and Datin Hajah Dayang Fatimah; he had a brother named Dato Paduka Haji Ahmad, Tutong District Officer from 1983 to 1984.

Hussain received his education in Brunei's Malay schools as well as English institutions at Malaya and Labuan. In 1951, he began working for the Bruneian government as a clerk, and five years later, he was named Pension Advisory Officer. He was chosen to become an officer in the Brunei Civil Service in April of 1958. Acting Deputy Pension Manager Hussain was one of the 19 young Bruneian officials and students who will be taking government scholarships to study in the UK and Australia. He was slated to depart by air on 18 September 1959 from Brunei. He spent nine months studying administration at Devonshire College in Torquay. Following that, he worked for a year at the British Colonial Office in London before going back to Brunei.

== Early career ==
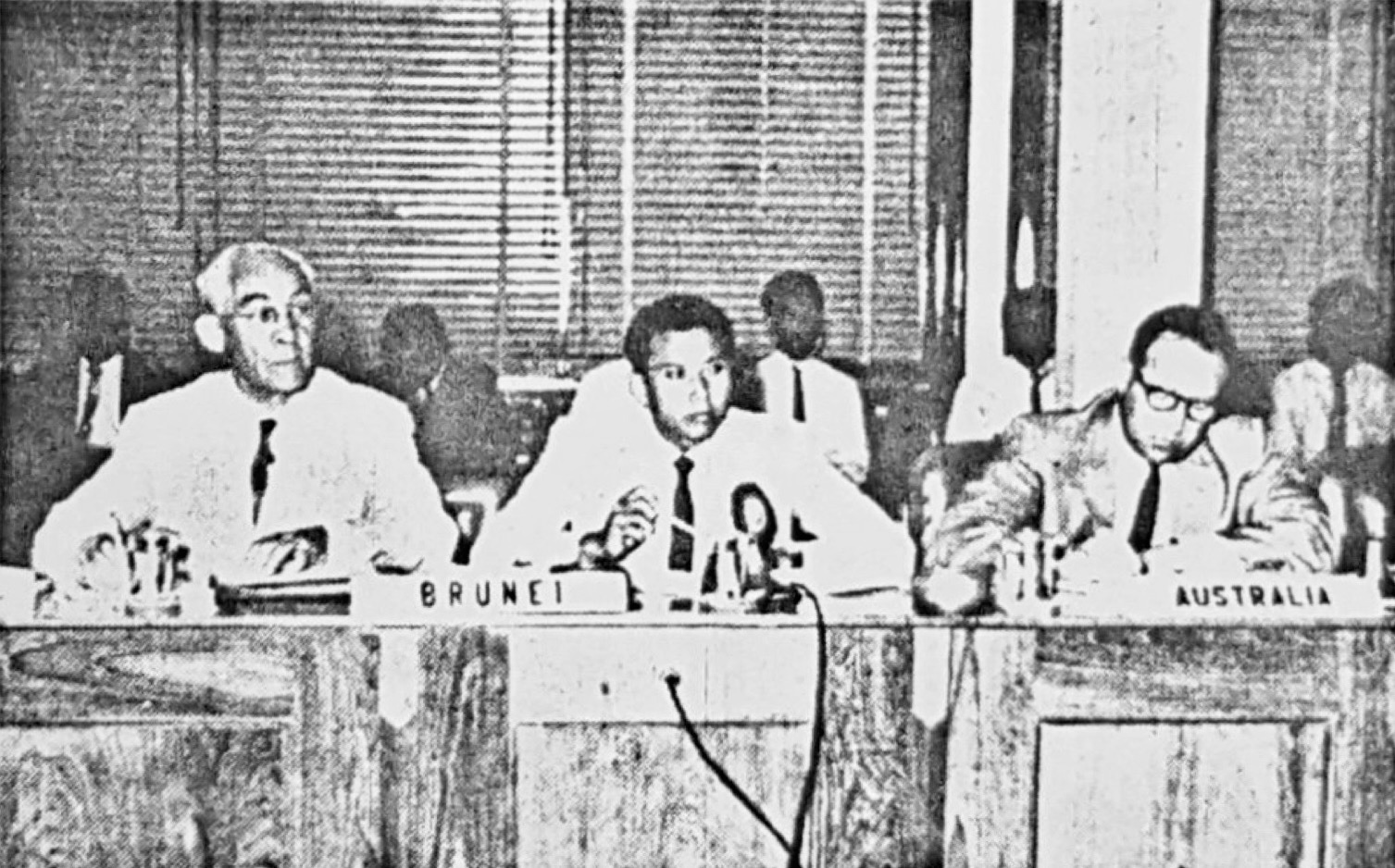
Hussain (middle) at the FAO and ECAFE conferences in 1963

On 1 January 1963, he began work with the Brunei Administrative Service (BAS) as their Grade 1 officer. Husin, accompanied by J.S. Gould, the UN Economic Advisor to the Government of Brunei, represented Brunei at the Food and Agriculture Organization (FAO) and the United Nations Economic Commission for Asia and the Far East (ECAFE) conferences in Bangkok from 2 to 14 September 1963. He would be reappointed as an Assistant State Financial Officer on 1 April 1967, and was later promoted on 1 January 1972. Lastly, he became the director in the MCYS from 1 July 1974 until 20 October 1986.

As a director at the MCYS on 29 January 1975, Pehin Hussain affirmed that the government of Brunei would hold training for the youth in cloth weaving, silversmiths and coppersmiths, barbers and tailors. This aims to qualify them into holding office or respective working fields. The Scout Association has designated 1 July of each year as Brunei's Scouts' Day to mark the country's admission as a member of the World Scout Movement. It hosted a thanksgiving ceremony on 4 October 1981. Hussein received the certificate appointing him as the Chief Scout of Brunei once Sultan of Brunei agree to visit to the council. The Kampong Pelambayan Mosque was built in 1983 and officially opened on 20 April 1984 by him.

== Ministerial career ==
On 20 October 1986, Hussain was appointed as minister in the MCYS.

Pehin Hussain when speaking during the inauguration of the 51st/2000-2001 Brunei Malay Teachers Association (PGGMB) General Meeting on 24 June 2001, he added that all these activities would be able to further fuel the name of PGGMB in contributing towards 'ASEAN Awareness' as contained in the Vision of ASEAN 2020. Additionally, he has also stated:

As an NGO who is stable and authoritative, after experiencing various ups and downs in life, the leadership of PGGMB and all its board, I already believe know how to compensate for the agenda of the struggle PGGMB faces in the future. The PGGMB leadership has been able to put together a 'Plan of Action' on projects based on the strategy of its struggle entrusted by all the board members.

— Yang Berhormat Pehin Orang Kaya Digadong Seri Lela Dato Seri Paduka (Dr.) Haji Awang Hussain, Pelita Brunei, 27 June 2001

The Brunei Darussalam Red Crescent Society, a longstanding NGO, is strengthening its authority through educational programs for members. Pehin Hussain emphasized the importance of such initiatives during Flag Day 2002, urging collaboration with the government for the welfare of vulnerable groups. He also called for increased charitable activities and addressing social issues, particularly among youth, through self-discipline-focused educational programs.

Sultan Hassanal Bolkiah went to the Royal Ceremony of Crown Prince Al-Muhtadee Billah and Sarah which took place with full wedding ceremony at Baitur Rahmah, Istana Nurul Iman on 24 August 2004. The ceremony started with Pehin Hussain praying to Pengiran Anak Abdul Aziz that the Royal Ceremony was ready. In the 2005 Bruneian cabinet reshuffle on 24 May, his tenure as minister came to an end.

== Death ==
On 4 December 2012, Sultan Hassanal Bolkiah paid his condolences to his family, after Hussein had died on 3 December at the age of 79. Abdul Aziz Juned, state mufti, conducted a collective prayer. Family members, Cabinet Ministers, past ministers, and top government officials were all there to pay their respects at the late former minister's residence in Jalan Damuan. At around 5 o'clock in the afternoon, according to family members, he died quietly in his sleep at home. He was then taken to Raja Isteri Pengiran Anak Saleha (RIPAS) Hospital for a medical examination.

== Personal life ==
Pehin Hussain was married and had one child. At the time of his death, he has four grandchildren and five great-grandchildren.

== Titles and honours ==
=== Titles ===
Hussain holds the title of Yang Berhormat (The Honourable) Pehin Orang Kaya Digadong Seri Lela on 24 August 1992, making him a member of Manteri. Additionally, he had previously held the title of Pehin Orang Kaya Udana Laila on 16 August 1972, and later Pehin Jawatan Luar Pekerma Raja on 12 April 1975.

=== Awards ===
He has been given the following awards:

- Youth Leadership Merit (2006)

=== Honours ===
Hussain has obtained an International Honorary Doctorate from the United States Sports Academy on 22 July 2000. Additionally, he has earned the following honours;

- Order of Seri Paduka Mahkota Brunei First Class (SPMB) – Dato Seri Paduka
- Order of Setia Negara Brunei Second Class (DSNB) – Dato Setia
- Sultan Hassanal Bolkiah Medal (PHBS)
- Meritorious Service Medal (PJK)

Political offices
Preceded by Jefri Bolkiah	2nd Minister of Culture, Youth and Sports; 20 October 1986 – 24 May 2005	Succeeded by Mohammad Daud
