= Prince Jefri Bolkiah =

Bruneian prince (born 1954)

Jefri Bolkiah جيفري بولكيه
- Pengiran Di-Gadong Sahibul Mal
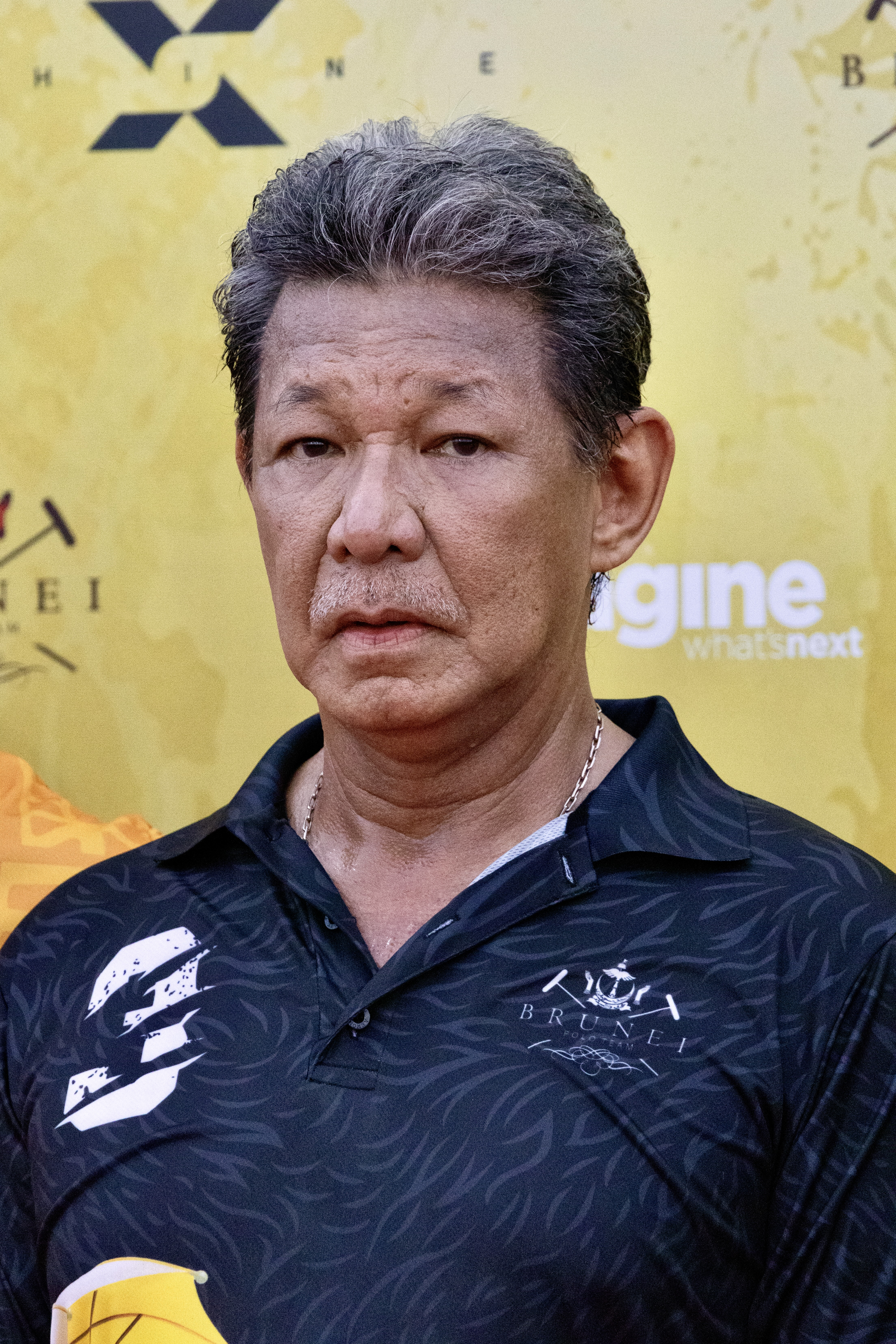
- Jefri Bolkiah in 2024

Minister of Finance
- In office 20 October 1986 – 23 February 1997
- Prime Minister: Hassanal Bolkiah
- Deputy: Ahmad Wally Skinner
- Preceded by: Hassanal Bolkiah
- Succeeded by: Hassanal Bolkiah

Minister of Culture, Youth and Sports
- In office 1 January 1984 – 20 October 1986
- Prime Minister: Hassanal Bolkiah
- Preceded by: Office established
- Succeeded by: Hussain Yusof
- Born: 6 November 1954 (age 72); Istana Darul Hana, Brunei Town, Brunei
- Spouse: Pengiran Norhayati (m. 1972) Evangeline Teodoro del Rosario (divorced) Ayen Munji (m. 1994; div. 2000) Claire Kelly (m. 2003)
- Issue: List: Abdul Hakeem; Hamidah Jamalul; Bahar; Samantha Richelle; Badi Francisco; Karraminah Clarrise; Faiq; Hassan Kiko
Names
- Jefri Bolkiah ibni Omar Ali Saifuddien Sa'adul Khairi Waddien
Regnal name
- Pengiran Muda Haji Jefri Bolkiah ibni Al-Marhum Sultan Haji Omar Ali Saifuddien Sa'adul Khairi Waddien
- House: Bolkiah
- Father: Sultan Omar Ali Saifuddin III
- Mother: Pengiran Anak Damit
- Education: Sultan Omar Ali Saifuddien College; Sports career
- Country: Brunei
- Sport: Polo
Medal record
Polo
Representing Brunei
SEA Games
Gold medal – first place	2019 Philippines	Men's tournament

Jefri Bolkiah ibni Omar Ali Saifuddien III (born 6 November 1954) is a member of the Bruneian royal family as the son of the Sultan Omar Ali Saifuddien III. He held several key ministerial positions, most notably as the finance minister from 1986 to 1997. During this time, he also chaired the Brunei Investment Agency (BIA), which manages much of the country's wealth and oversees its overseas investments. Additionally, he is the deputy chairman 3 of the Jabatan Adat Istiadat Negara.

== Early life and education ==
Pengiran Muda Jefri Bolkiah was born on 6 November 1954 at Istana Darul Hana in Brunei Town, later known as Bandar Seri Begawan. He is the fourth son of Sultan Omar Ali Saifuddien III and Pengiran Anak Damit, as well as the fifth younger sibling of Sultan Hassanal Bolkiah. Prince Mohamed Bolkiah and Prince Sufri Bolkiah are his two other brothers, while Princess Masna, Princess Nor'ain, Princess Umi Kalthum Al-Islam, Princess Amal Rakiah, Princess Amal Nasibah, and Princess Amal Jefriah are his six sisters. In 1967, at the age of 13, he underwent the circumcision ceremony alongside Sufri Bolkiah.

On 31 August 1972, Jefri Bolkiah married Pengiran Norhayati binti Pengiran Dato Paduka Haji Abdul Rahman in a grand ceremony. In his spare time, he was involved in sports, particularly polo, and took part in various charitable activities. Like his older brother Sufri Bolkiah, he attended Sultan Omar Ali Saifuddien College before furthering his studies abroad.

== Political career ==
Upon Brunei's independence in 1984, Jefri Bolkiah was appointed deputy minister of finance and minister of culture, youth, and sports. He later served as the minister of finance from 20 October 1986 to 23 February 1997, overseeing the country's substantial oil and gas revenues through the BIA, where he also held the position of chairman. During his tenure, he established the Amedeo Development Corporation, a network of companies and investment vehicles managed by his son, Pengiran Muda Abdul Hakeem. It evolved into a holding corporation with the goal of promoting the growth of Brunei's private sector. Amedeo quickly became the largest private conglomerate in the nation, with 27 companies specialising in non-hydrocarbon industries like infrastructure (port management, electrification, and telecommunications), tourism (The Empire Brunei and Jerudong Park), real estate, and finance. It was also involved in the acquisition of the luxury goods company Asprey.

Jefri Bolkiah was a key figure in Brunei's economic aspirations during the 6th National Development Plan (RKN 6), which lasted from 1991 until 1995. The strategy sought to construct 2,000 industrial ventures, generate 40,000 employment, and draw in US$2 billion in foreign direct investment outside the hydrocarbon industry by the year 2000. Tighter regulation of the oil and gas industry was prioritised alongside economic diversification. He was the head of the Brunei Oil and Gas Authority, which was founded on 1 April 1993, and also ran his own business, Jasra International Petroleum.

As BIA-related construction projects were booming, Jefri Bolkiah led the establishment of the Development Bank of Brunei in January 1995 and co-founded the Baiduri Bank in August 1994. His efforts to advance a Western-style financial framework, alongside the government's concurrent growth of an Islamic finance sector, were evident in these projects. The establishment of an export zone in Muara in May 1994, the partial privatisation of port management, the lowering of import duties on 650 goods and equipment in April 1995, and the opening of a container terminal in early 1996 were among the noteworthy milestones that followed under his direction. Brunei's economic prospects were bolstered by the discovery of a large gas resource and its categorisation as a developed country by the World Bank in 1996, despite stalled investment outside of petroleum due to antiquated tax regulations. This acknowledgement highlighted the country's social advancements, such as the quadrupled health budget in the RKN 7.

Following the 1997 Asian financial crisis, the sultan ordered external audits of BIA's finances, revealing that Jefri Bolkiah had allegedly embezzled $14.8 billion. Although he denied the charges, the Brunei government accused him of misappropriating state funds. Amid growing tensions with the sultan over the management of Brunei's vast wealth, Jefri stepped down as finance minister. By July 1998, the Amedeo Group collapsed under a $10 billion debt. Shortly thereafter, on 31 July, the sultan stripped him of control over the country's investment arm and telecoms empire, following widespread reports of significant financial losses in the conglomerate he managed. In June 1998, the Bruneian government established a finance task force to investigate the operations of the BIA. Between 1983 and 1998, around $40 billion in "special transfers" were made from BIA accounts, raising significant concerns about the management of these funds. Under the authority granted by emergency decrees, Arthur Andersen's partners assumed management of his businesses as executive managers.

== Legal issues ==
=== Brunei government ===
Jefri Bolkiah has been involved in numerous legal disputes with the state of Brunei, leading to one of the most expensive legal battles in history. An independent investigation into significant financial transfers revealed that approximately $14.8 billion was transferred to Jefri Bolkiah's accounts, $8 billion to the sultan's, and $3.8 billion for government purposes. However, the purpose and recipients of the remaining funds remain unidentified. Due to the blurred lines between royal and state finances, it has been challenging to ascertain the full truth behind these transactions. He was subsequently accused of misappropriating state funds for personal investments through the BIA and the Amedeo Group, leading to his removal as head of BIA.

In February 2000, the Bruneian government sought a court order to freeze his overseas assets, prompting Jefri Bolkiah to countersue in New York. After extended negotiations, a settlement agreement was signed in May 2000, though its terms were never publicly disclosed. He claimed he received assurances from the sultan that he could retain certain properties to maintain his lifestyle, a claim the BIA denied. Following the agreement, he began returning assets, including over 500 properties in Brunei and abroad, 2,000 cars, 100 paintings, five boats, and nine aircraft. By 2001, 10,000 items from his collection were auctioned. This agreement was not publicly disclosed, and after a series of legal battles, the UK's Privy Council ruled in 2007 that the agreement was enforceable.

Despite this, the BIA accused Jefri Bolkiah of failing to disclose all his accounts and allowing withdrawals from frozen funds, leading to renewed legal action. After several appeals, the case reached the Privy Council in London, Brunei's highest court of appeal due to its historical ties to Britain. The Privy Council dismissed Jefri's claims that he had the right to retain certain properties, calling his arguments "simply incredible," and ruled in favour of the Brunei government and the BIA, ordering him to return the remaining assets.

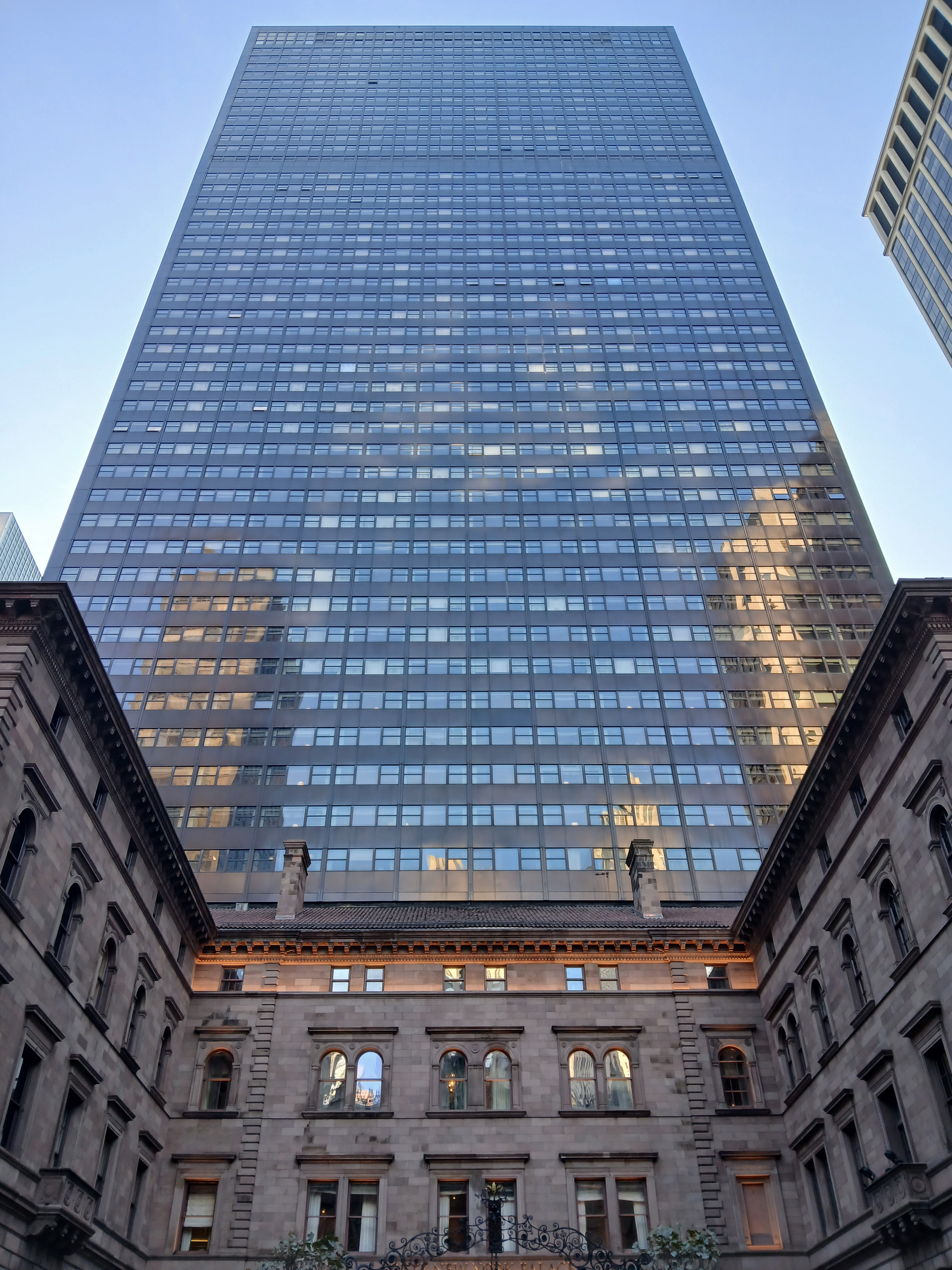
The Lotte New York Palace Hotel

The ruling did not end the litigation. The BIA pursued further legal action in Malaysia and the Cayman Islands, gaining control of key assets, including the Hotel Bel-Air in Los Angeles and The New York Palace Hotel in Manhattan. They also reopened proceedings in the British High Court, accusing him of providing misleading information about his assets. Scheduled for June 2008, the contempt hearing was postponed when he failed to attend, instead travelling to Paris. Judge Peter Smith issued a warrant for his arrest, which, as of November 2010, remains active, meaning he would face arrest if he entered the UK.

=== Shannon Marketic lawsuit ===
On 3 March 1997, Shannon Marketic, a former Miss USA, accused Jefri Bolkiah, the sultan, and others of luring her and several women to Brunei under false pretences to join a harem, alleging abuse by members of the royal court. She claimed that she was hired to make a promotional appearance for the sultan in 1996, but upon arriving in Brunei, her passport was confiscated, and she was detained for 32 days while performing in an Asian male discotheque, where she was allegedly sexually harassed by some men. Although her complaint was filed in a U.S. federal court, the case was eventually dismissed as Jefri Bolkiah was granted diplomatic immunity. The media later uncovered similar stories from other young women, but all such claims were rejected by the sultan and his court.

=== Manoukian property dispute ===
In February 1998, Jefri Bolkiah was sued by his former business partners, Bob and Rafi Manoukian, for £80 million over two disputed property deals. The Manoukians claimed that he reneged on agreements and led a wildly extravagant lifestyle, including flying in prostitutes from around the world. He countersued, but the dispute was later settled out of court.

=== Derbyshire ===
In 2006, Jefri Bolkiah initiated legal proceedings in both the UK and the U.S. against his former advisors, barrister Thomas Derbyshire and his wife Faith Zaman, accusing them of misappropriating funds. The couple, who had worked for him since 2004 and managed several of his companies, were accused of diverting proceeds from property sales and charging personal expenses to corporate credit cards. They denied any wrongdoing, claiming all contested expenses were for him and his family, and counter-sued for $12 million, alleging unpaid fees. Despite the case being valued at $7 million, Brunei reportedly spent $60 million in legal costs, with him testifying as a key witness for the state, which frequently questioned his credibility and compliance with court orders.

=== Leaked statues controversy ===
In November 2010, explicit statues of Jefri Bolkiah and his fiancée, Micha Raines, were leaked, adding further controversy. However, Judge Ira Gammerman deemed these details, along with Jefri's wealth, multiple marriages, BIA's challenges to his credibility, and the outstanding British arrest warrant, irrelevant to the case and barred them from being mentioned in court. After nearly six weeks of trial, the jury returned a near-unanimous verdict against him on all but one count, ordering him and the New York Palace Hotel to pay $21 million to the Derbyshires. Brunei announced its intention to appeal the verdict.

== Personal life ==
=== Marriages and issue ===
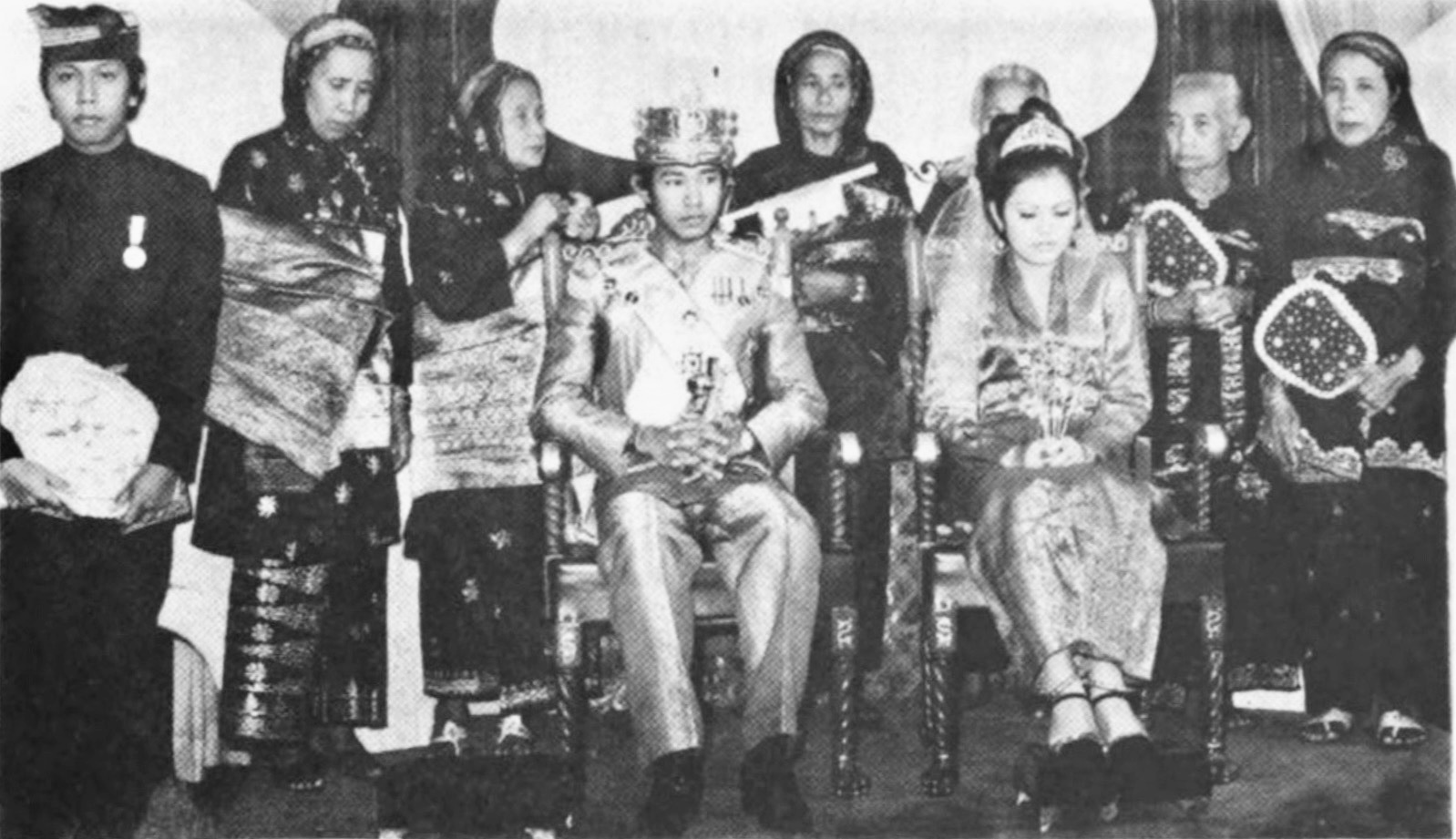
Wedding of Jefri Bolkiah and Pengiran Anak Norhayati in 1972

It is not known how many times Jefri Bolkiah has been married or how many children he has. In 2008, he was reported to be married to three women and divorced from two others. At the same time he had "seventeen children aged between 2 and 35" from seven different women.

In 1972, Jefri married Pengiran Anak Isteri Pengiran Anak Norhayati binti Pengiran Jaya Negara Pengiran Haji Abdul Rahman. They remain married and have three children together.

- Pengiran Muda Abdul Hakeem (born 13 June 1973), married.
  - Pengiran Anak Abdul Halim Ar-Rahman
- Pengiran Anak Hamidah Jamalul Bulqiah (born 26 April 1977), married to Pengiran Anak Abdul 'Ali Yil-Kabier
  - Pengiran Anak Abdul Muta'ali Haziq Hamidullah
  - Pengiran Anak Adriana Haziqah Jaida Bulqiah
  - Pengiran Anak Alisha Husnara Jaida Bulqiah
- Pengiran Muda Bahar (born 20 August 1981), married to Princess Azemah Ni'matul Bolkiah

He later married Evangeline Teodoro del Rosario who used the name Fatimah binti Abdullah while they were married. They have four children.

- Samantha Richelle del Rosario (born 16 December 1988), an actress married to Anton del Rosario
- Karraminah Clarisse 'K.C.' del Rosario, a model and actress
- Joanna del Rosario
- Badi Francisco del Rosario, a musician married to Ana Sabrina
  - Malena del Rosario

In 1994, Jefri married Filipino actress Ayen Munji, with whom he has one son. They divorced in 2000.

- Hasan Kiko Munji Bolkiah (born 1995)

Sometime before 1998, Jefri married American, Jefridah Mohammed Louis.

Jefri also has two children with an unnamed Malay wife.

- Faiq bin Prince Jefri Bolkiah (born 9 May 1998), a professional footballer
- Qiana binti Prince Jefri Bolkiah (born 9 May 1998)

Around 2003, Jefri married New Zealander, Claire Kelly. She took the name Salma binti Abdullah when they married and together they have two sons. In 2008, they were living in St John's Lodge, London.

Over the years, he has faced numerous accusations, including lawsuits from women claiming he paid them to travel to Brunei for sexual purposes. Allegations suggest he maintained a harem of up to 25 women for several years. Among them was writer Jillian Lauren, who documented her experiences in the book Some Girls: My Life in a Harem.

=== Personal interests ===
Jefri Bolkiah is known for his extravagant lifestyle. His costly possessions included a private Boeing 747, a large art collection including works by Édouard Manet, Pierre-Auguste Renoir and at least twenty-one works by Edgar Degas, along with a collection of 2,000 luxury cars including specially commissioned unique Aston Martins, a number of properties including the Plaza, Athénée hotel in Paris and Hotel Bel-Air in Los Angeles, the New York Palace Hotel in Manhattan, and others in Paris, Las Vegas and St John's Lodge, in Regent's Park, London, and businesses such as the luxury goods manufacturer Asprey. By the 2000s, due to his legal issues he was forced to sell many of his assets and exiled from Brunei, although as of September 2009 he appears to have been allowed to return to Brunei and has been seen in public with the royal family.

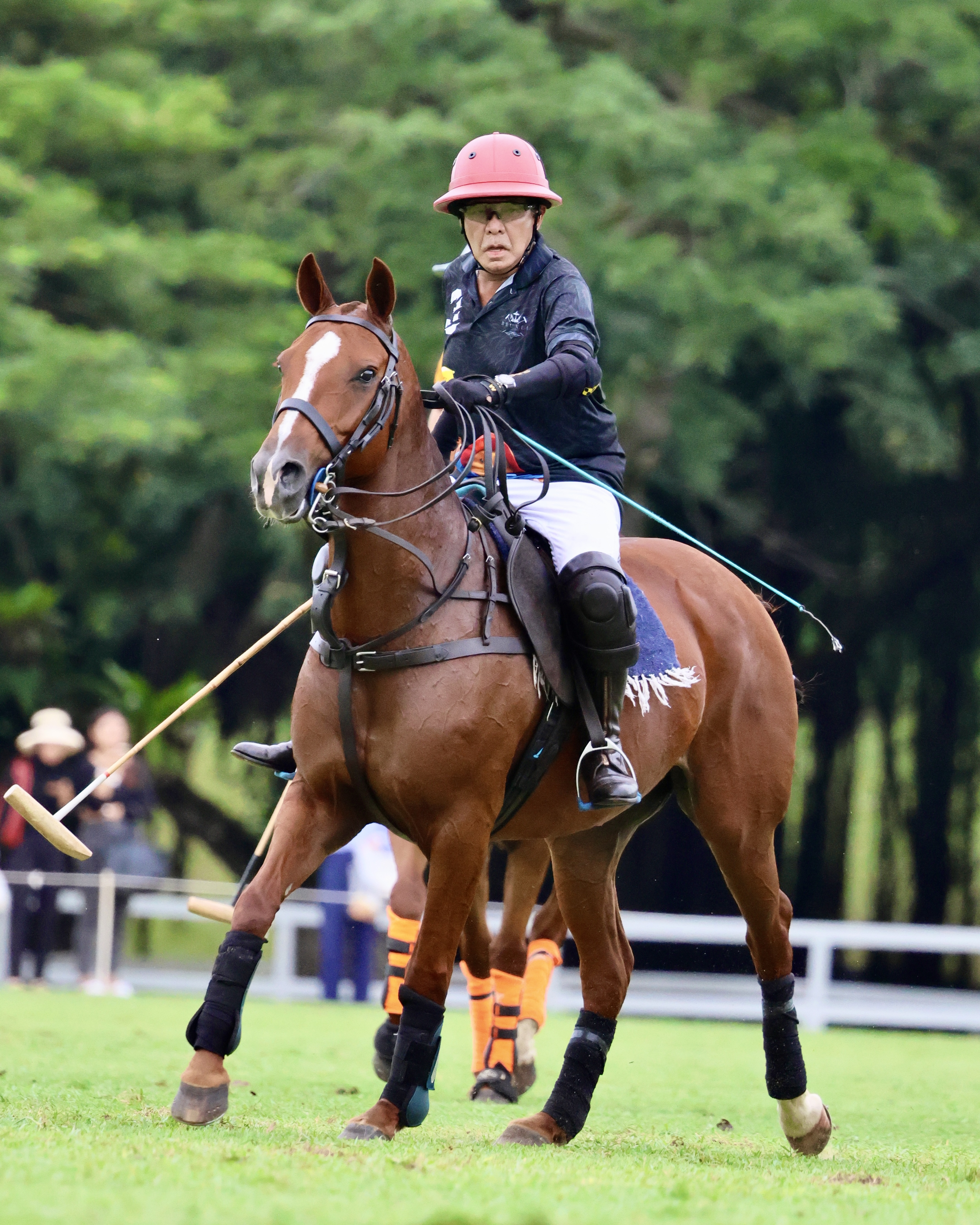
Jefri Bolkiah taking part in the 2024 Charity Polo Tournament

Jefri Bolkiah played for Brunei's national polo team, which defeated Malaysia 7-4 in the Division B: 0-2 goals category to win a gold medal at the 30th SEA Games. This was Brunei's second gold medal at the competition and the first time since their debut in 1977 that they have won multiple gold medals abroad. Throughout the game, the squad held a commanding lead, and their success was aided by a third chukka effort. After losing to Malaysia in the qualification round, this victory came after that. On 23 June 2024, Jefri Bolkiah participated in the Charity Polo Tournament at the Royal Brunei Polo and Riding Club in Jerudong as a member of the BEARS team, securing a 2–1 victory over the TIGERS. On 13 July, he participated in the finals of the sultan's Polo Cup 2024 at the same venue, leading the AHMIBAH team to a second runner-up position.

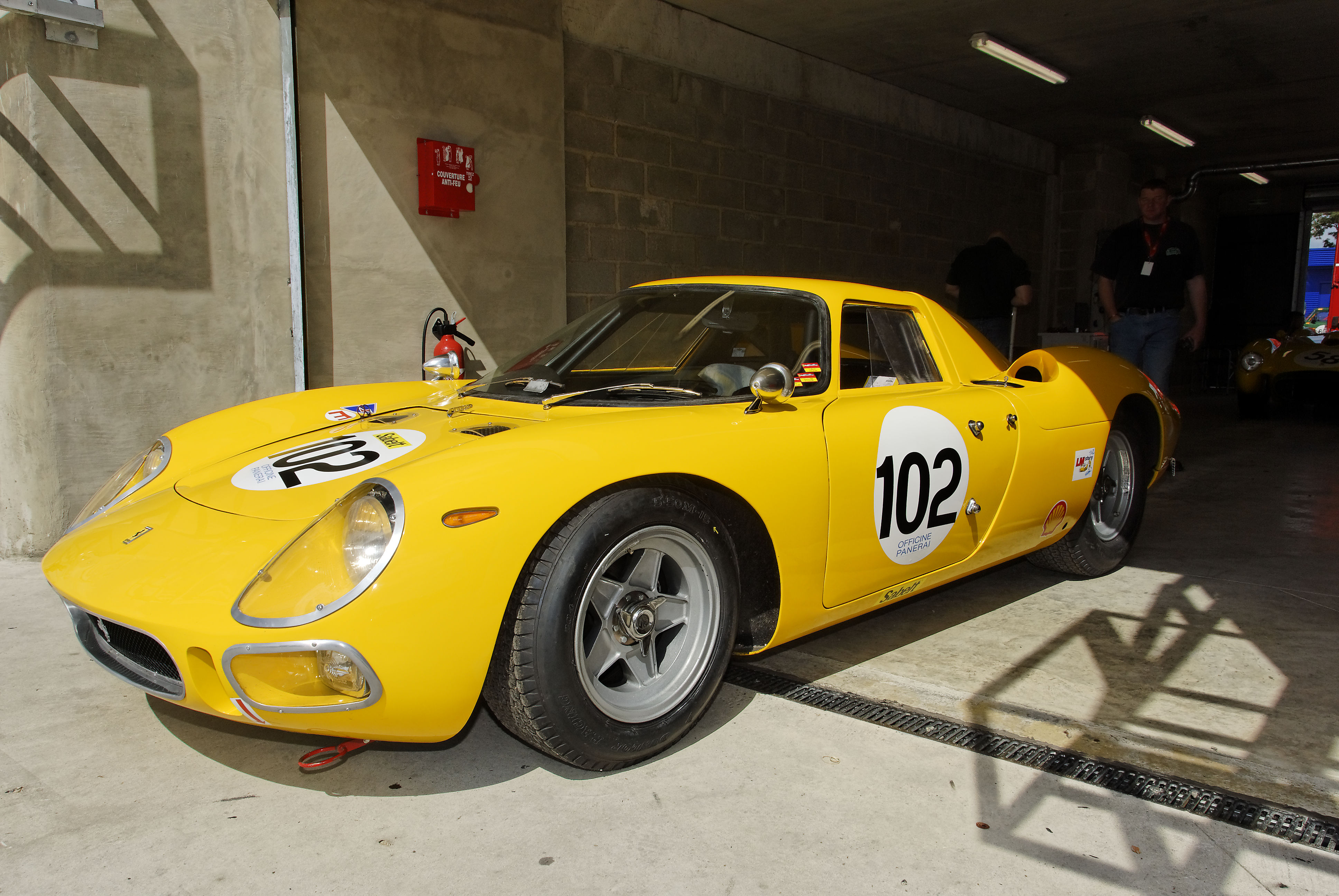
A 1965 Ferrari 250 LM, formerly owned by Jefri Bolkiah

The vast car collection of the Brunei royal family, often attributed to Sultan Hassanal Bolkiah, was primarily amassed by Jefri Bolkiah. At its peak, the collection exceeded 2,000 vehicles, including rare models such as ten McLaren F1s, eleven specially customised Ferrari F40s, multiple Porsche 959s, Bugatti EB110s, and unique creations like the Bentley Dominator and Pininfarina-modified Ferrari 456 variants. However, much of the collection's current status remains unclear. Following financial difficulties, a significant portion, reportedly co-owned by him and the sultan, is believed to have been abandoned, leaving the fate of many vehicles uncertain.

Feadship delivered the 55 metres (180 ft) superyacht, M/Y Tits, to Jefri Bolkiah in 1996. The owner's main deck, which includes a dining area, gym, office, and a spacious master suite with a private lounge, walk-in wardrobe, and elaborate bathroom, is part of the yacht's impressive exterior spaces, which were designed by the renowned British designer Andrew Winch. The VIP stateroom on the bridge deck has a grand piano, and the elevator, which is housed in a fireproof glass box, connects the four decks with separate crew staircases and entrances to ensure discreet service. Additionally, the yacht came with tenders named Nipple 1 and Nipple 2. The boat gained notoriety for its contentious moniker, presumed to have been chosen by him, which garnered significant attention, was regarded as unusual, and frequently caused embarrassment during public appearances. Mostly based in Brunei, the boat was rarely seen outside of its territorial waters. Its one outing was to the 1996 APEC conference, where it was allegedly requested to depart because of the connotations of its name. M/Y Tits' contentious existence came to an end in the early 2000s when it was sold and renamed Claire.

The construction of the yacht Dubai was a complicated procedure that involved three changes of ownership. With a gross tonnage of 12,488GT, the yacht was the largest yacht in the world by volume when it was first commissioned by Jefri Bolkiah. It was designed by Winch and constructed in Germany by Blohm+Voss. However, only the steel hull and a portion of the aluminum superstructure were finished when the project ceased in 1998. At the Blohm+Voss yard, the boat was left on a floating dock while liquidators looked for possible buyers. In the end, the yacht's original planned royal owners were replaced when it was sold to the Dubai government.

== Titles, styles and honours ==
=== Titles and styles ===
Styles of Prince Jefri Bolkiah
- Reference style: His Royal Highness
- Spoken style: Your Royal Highness
- Alternative style: Duli Tuanku

Personal standard of Pengiran Di-Gadong Sahibul Mal

Jefri Bolkiah was appointed the wazir title Duli Yang Teramat Mulia Paduka Seri Pengiran Di-Gadong Sahibul Mal with the consent of the sultan on Wednesday afternoon, 8 November 1979.

=== Honours ===
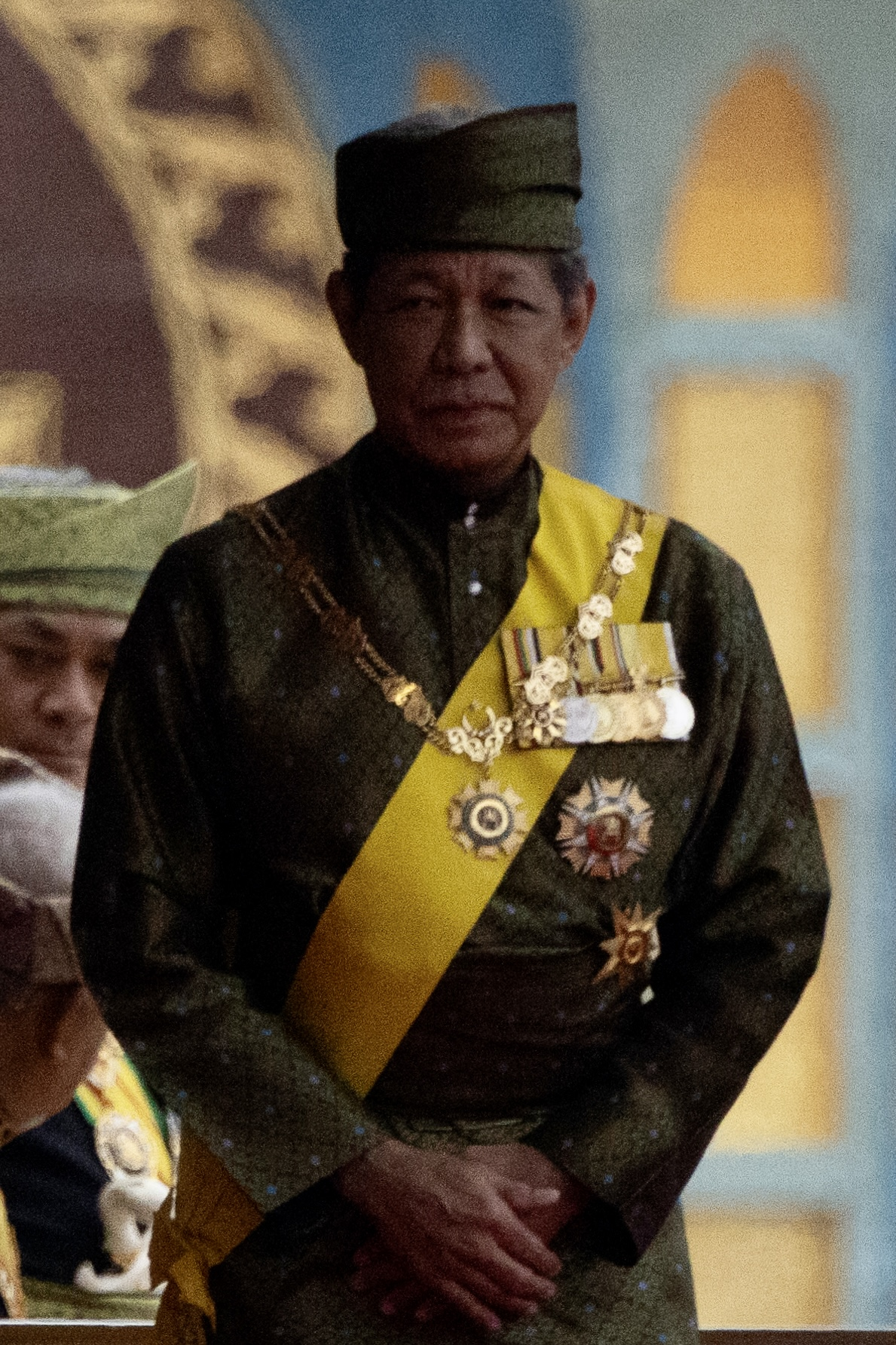
Jefri Bolkiah in his ceremonial dress in 2024

Jefri Bolkiah has been bestowed the following national honours :

- Order of the Crown of Brunei (DKMB)
- Order of Laila Utama (DK I) – Dato Laila Utama (26 December 1970)
- Sultan Hassanal Bolkiah Medal (PHBS; 1 August 1968)
- Pingat Bakti Laila Ikhlas (PBLI; 1975)
- Sultan of Brunei Golden Jubilee Medal (5 October 2017)
- Sultan of Brunei Silver Jubilee Medal (5 October 1992)
- Proclamation of Independence Medal (1984)
- Meritorious Service Medal (PJK; 2021)

He has also been bestowed upon several foreign honours :

- Malaysia :
  - Order of the Defender of the Realm Grand Commander (SMN) – Tun (8 April 1989)
  - Order of the Crown of Johor Knight Grand Commander (SPMJ) – Dato'
  - Order of Sultan Ahmad Shah of Pahang Grand Knight (SSAP) – Dato' Sri
  - Order of Cura Si Manja Kini Grand Knight (SPCM) – Dato' Seri
  - Order of Sultan Salahuddin Abdul Aziz Shah Knight Grand Companion (SSSA) – Dato' Seri
  - Recipient of the 9th Yang di-Pertuan Agong Installation Medal (18 September 1989)
- Morocco :
  - Order of Muhammad First Class
- Saudi Arabia :
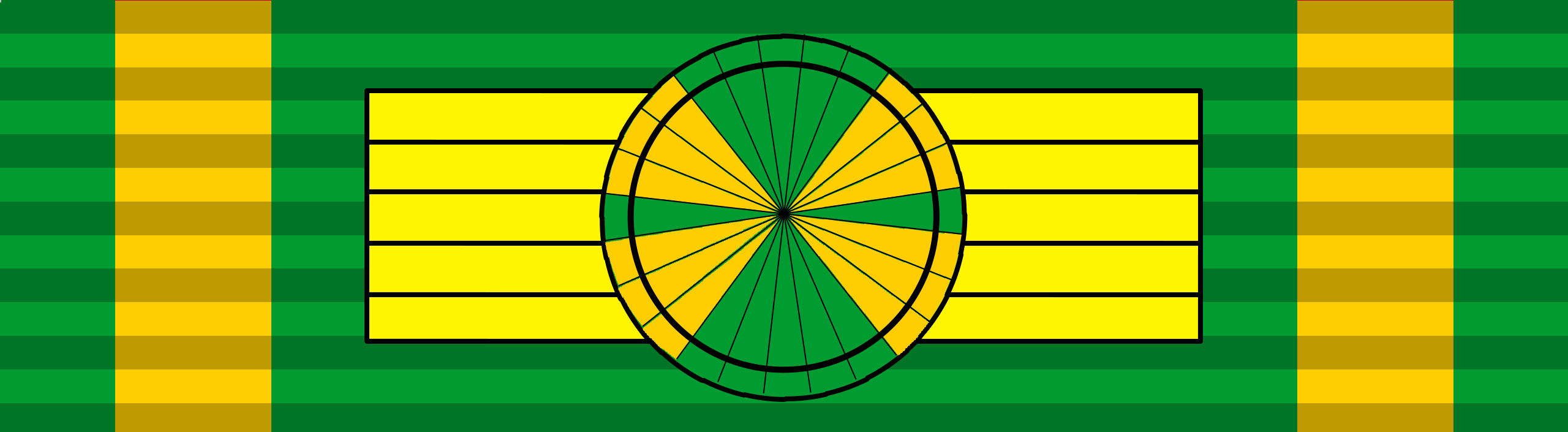
  - Order of Abdulaziz Al Saud First Class (1990)
- Singapore :
  - Order of Nila Utama First Class (DUNU; 12 February 1990)
- South Korea :
  - Grand Order of Mugunghwa
  - Order of Diplomatic Service Merit First Grade
- Thailand :
  - Order of the White Elephant Knight Grand Cordon (MPCh (GCE))
- United Kingdom :
  - Royal Victorian Order Honorary Knight Grand Cross (GCVO) – Sir (3 November 1992)

=== Things named after him ===
- Jefri Bolkiah Mosque, a mosque opened in Kampong Batong on 26 July 2013.
- IBTE Jefri Bolkiah Campus, a post-secondary vocational institute in Kuala Belait.

Political offices
Preceded by Hassanal Bolkiah	2nd Minister of Finance; 20 October 1986 – 23 February 1997	Succeeded by Hassanal Bolkiah
Preceded by Office established	1st Minister of Culture, Youth and Sports; 1 January 1984 – 21 October 1986	Succeeded by Hussain Yusof
Prince Jefri Bolkiah House of Bolkiah Born: 6 November 1954
Preceded by Abdul Aleem	Succession to the Bruneian throne 18th position	Succeeded by Abdul Hakeem
Regnal titles
Preceded by Pengiran Anak Khamis	Pengiran Di-Gadong Sahibul Mal; 1979–present	Incumbent
