= Ali Apong =

Bruneian politician (born 1958)

Dato Seri Setia Ali Apong PSNB DPMB PJK PIKB PKL
- علي اڤوڠ
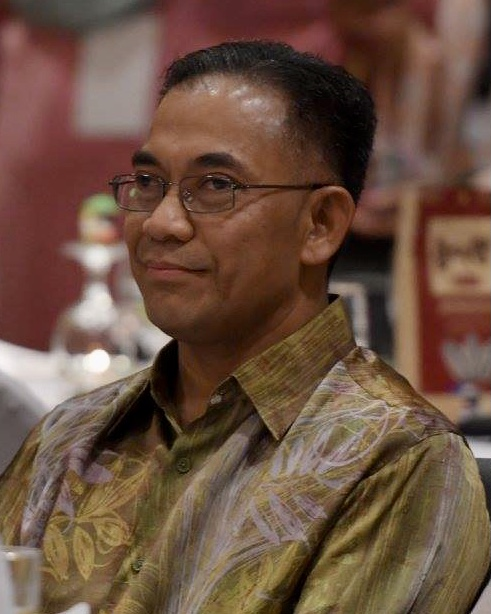
- Ali in 2017

4th Minister of Primary Resources and Tourism
- In office 22 October 2015 – 7 June 2022
- Monarch: Hassanal Bolkiah
- Preceded by: Yahya Bakar
- Succeeded by: Abdul Manaf Metussin

Deputy Minister at the Prime Minister's Office
- In office 18 November 2010 – 22 October 2015 Serving with Abdul Wahab Juned
- Preceded by: Eusoff Agaki
- Succeeded by: Hamdan Abu Bakar; Roselan Daud

3rd Deputy Minister of Development
- In office 29 May 2010 – 18 November 2010
- Minister: Abdullah Bakar
- Preceded by: Mat Suny
- Succeeded by: Suhaimi Gafar
Other positions
Chairman of Brunei Economic Development Board
In office 18 November 2010 – 8 October 2018
| Preceded by | Timothy Ong (Acting) |
| Succeeded by | Amin Liew Abdullah |

Personal details
- Born: 19 October 1958 (age 67) Kampong Kuala Abang, Tutong, Brunei
- Education: University of Reading (BA); Imperial College London (MBA)
- Occupation: Civil servant; politician

Ali bin Haji Apong (born 19 October 1958) is a Bruneian politician who serves as the Deputy Minister of Development and for the Prime Minister's Office from 2010 until 2015. He later became the Minister of Primary Resources and Tourism (MPRT) from 2015 until 2022.

== Early life and education ==
Ali Apong is born on 18 August 1958, in Kampong Kuala Abang, Tutong. He graduated from University of Reading with honours degree in Economics and later earned both his postgraduate diploma in Management and Master of Business Administration from the Imperial College of Science, Technology and Medicine.

== Early career ==
He first began his career as an Investment Officer in the Brunei Investment Agency (BIA) in 1983, followed by a later appointment to an Assistant Managing Director on 1 September 1997. From 1999 until early 2002, he was part of a Ministry of Finance and Economy team to establish the Brunei International Financial Centre, before returning to his previous position in the BIA. In 2004, Ali Apong was appointed as a Permanent Secretary in the Ministry of Finance and Economy on October 21, 2004, and later transferred to the Prime Minister's Office (PMO) with the same position on 24 September 2009. On 18 November 2010, he was appointed as the chairman of the Brunei Economic Development Board.

== Ministerial career ==
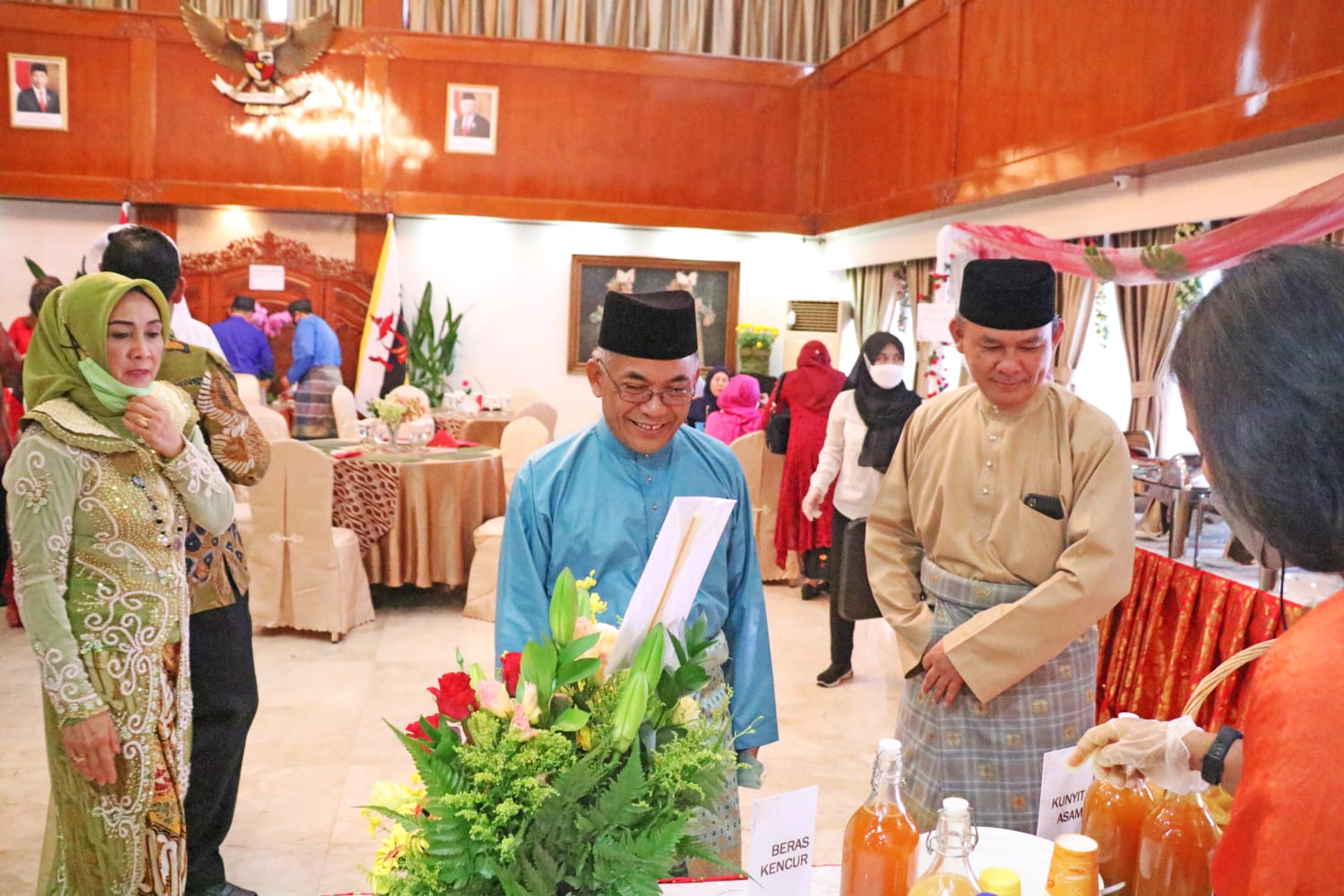
Ali and Aminuddin Ihsan in the Embassy of Indonesia during the 2022 Eid Al-Fitr celebration.

Ali was appointed deputy minister of development in the 2010 Bruneian cabinet reshuffle on 29 May. Later that year, on 18 November, he was reappointed deputy minister in the PMO, until another cabinet reshuffle on 22 October 2015, where it was then announced that he had been reappointed as the first minister for the newly established Ministry of Primary Resources and Tourism.

Ali Apong had previously stated that sophisticated aquaculture technology employed by international businesses might increase output and encourage self-sufficiency earlier in March 2019. In the previous six years, the aquaculture industry in Brunei has reported a 440 percent rise in output, going from 302 tonnes (297 long tons; 333 short tons) ($3 million) in 2011 to 1,632 tonnes ($17 million) in 2017.

Ali retained his position in the 2018 Bruneian cabinet reshuffle, which replaced six ministers.

By maximising the 1,000 hectares that are currently being actively farmed in Brunei, self-sufficiency can rise to 10% in 2020, according to him. Nine rice fields in Brunei-Muara are supplied with water by the Imang Dam, which has been upgraded and expanded in capacity.

Officials in Bandar Seri Begawan began by halting the coronavirus's spread to the sultanate during the COVID-19 outbreak in Brunei. In January 2020, the ministers of education and health of Brunei, Hamzah Sulaiman, Isham Jaafar, and Ali Apong, minister of primary resources and tourism, held a news conference to announce travel restrictions from China, namely the epicenter of Hubei Province.

In order to better understand the natural ecosystem of Brunei's forests, Ali Apong has urged for ongoing scientific study. The Brunei Darussalam Conference On Forest: Forests And Biodiversity: Unveiling Its Economic Potential, held in connection with the Brunei Mid-Year Conference and Exhibition (MYCE) 2021, included him as the keynote speaker yesterday. He said:

These include clearing of forest areas to make way for these activities that result in deforestation and building dams for irrigation purposes, which may cause floods resulting in net forest loss, as well as loss of wildlife. That is why in the agriculture industry, it is important for us to consider modern or vertical farming, which includes different use of land to ensure the highest yield per hectare, instead of simply using up more land that only produces low yield. Forests provide us with the air we breathe, timber that we use, food for our sustenance, medicines to cure sickness and other essentials for our well-being. Forests also support environmental stability, provides watershed protection, prevent soil erosion, mitigate climate change and are also habitats for wildlife.

The cabinet reshuffled again on 7 June 2022, his position as the Minister was succeeded by Abdul Manaf Metussin.

== Honours ==
Ali has earned the following honours:

- Order of Setia Negara Brunei First Class (PSNB) – Dato Seri Setia
- Order of Seri Paduka Mahkota Brunei Second Class (DPMB; 15 July 2005) – Dato Paduka
- Meritorious Service Medal (PJK)
- Excellent Service Medal (PIKB)
- Long Service Medal (PKL)

== See also ==
- Cabinet of Brunei

Political offices
| Preceded by Yahya Bakar | 4th Minister of Primary Resources and Tourism; 22 October 2015 – 7 June 2022 | Succeeded by Abdul Manaf Metussin |
| Preceded by Eusoff Agaki | Deputy Minister at The Prime Minister's Office; 18 November 2010 – 22 October 2015 | Succeeded by Hamdan Abu Bakar; Roselan Daud |
| Preceded by Mat Suny | 3rd Deputy Minister of Development; 20 May 2010 – 18 November 2010 | Succeeded by Suhaimi Gafar |
Business positions
| Preceded by Timothy Ong (Acting) | Chairman of Brunei Economic Development Board; 18 November 2010 – 8 October 2018 | Succeeded by Amin Liew Abdullah |
