= Abdul Rahman bin Ibrahim =

Bruneian civil servant and politician (born 1954)

Yang Dimuliakan Pehin Orang Kaya Laila Setia Dato Seri Setia Abdul Rahman bin Ibrahim PSNB DPMB PIKB PKL
- عبدالرحمن بن إبراهيم
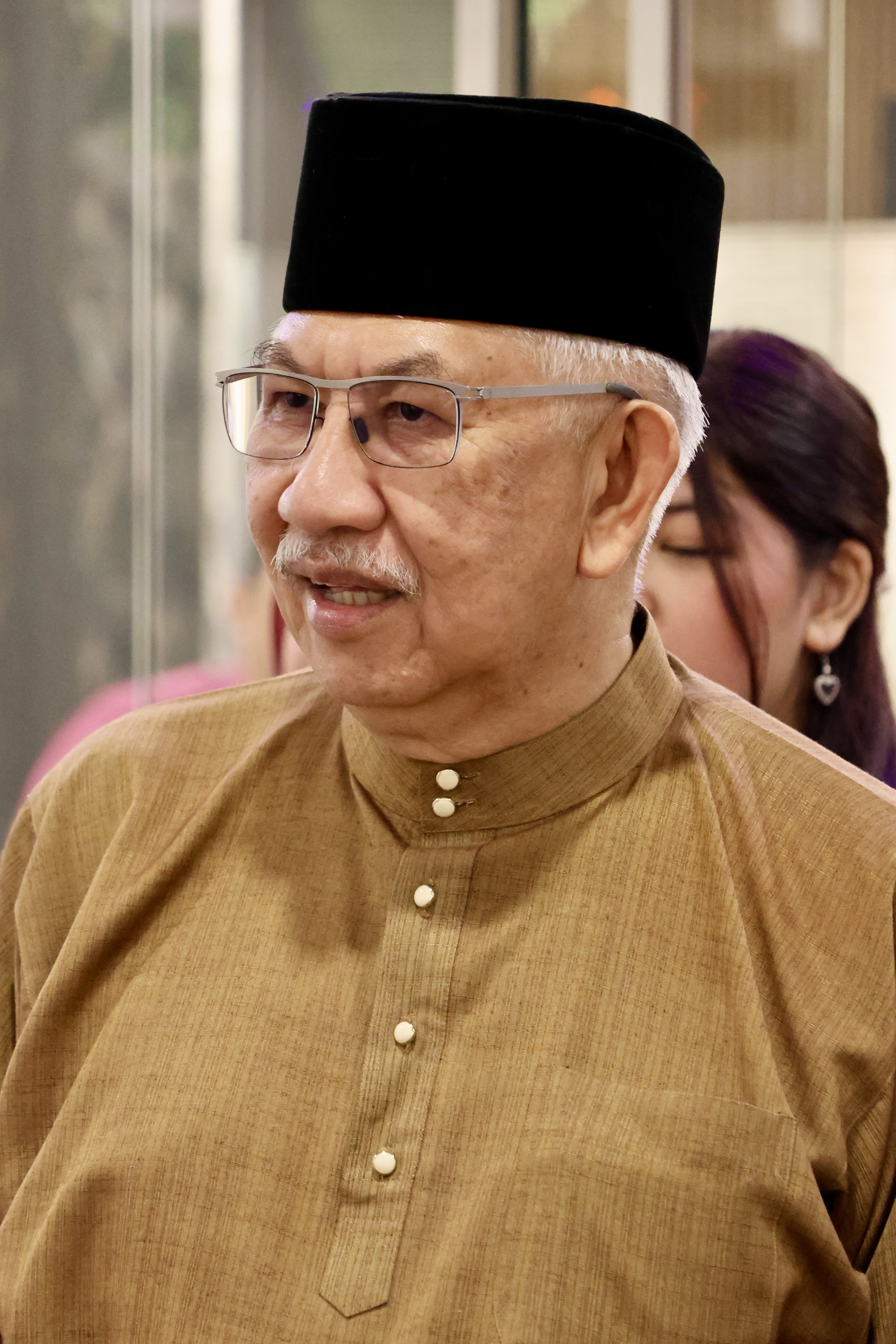
- Abdul Rahman in 2024

Member of the Legislative Council
- Incumbent
- Assumed office 20 January 2023

Minister at the Prime Minister's Office
- In office 22 October 2015 – 27 September 2018 Serving with Lim Jock Seng
- Monarch: Hassanal Bolkiah
- Deputy: Hamdan Abu Bakar; Roselan Daud
- Succeeded by: Isa Ibrahim; Amin Liew Abdullah; Abdul Mokti Daud

1st Minister of Finance II
- In office 24 May 2005 – 30 January 2018
- Deputy: Bahrin Abdullah
- Preceded by: Office established
- Succeeded by: Amin Liew Abdullah

Deputy Minister of Finance
- In office 20 September 2004 – 24 May 2005
- Minister: Hassanal Bolkiah
- Preceded by: Yakub Abu Bakar
- Succeeded by: Bahrin Abdullah

Personal details
- Born: 31 October 1954 (age 71) Kampong Peramu, Kampong Ayer, Brunei
- Spouse: Sapiah Sabtu
- Education: Sultan Omar Ali Saifuddien College; University of Hull (BSc); Arthur D. Little School of Management; London Business School
- Profession: Civil servant; politician

Abdul Rahman bin Haji Ibrahim (born 31 October 1954) is a Bruneian aristocrat, civil servant and politician who serve as a member of the Legislative Council of Brunei (LegCo) since 2023. He has formerly held office as the deputy minister of finance from 2004 to 2005, minister of finance II from 2005 to 2018, and as minister at the Prime Minister's Office (PMO) from 2015 to 2018.

== Early life and education ==
Abdul Rahman bin Haji Ibrahim was born on 31 October 1954 in Kampong Peramu of Kampong Ayer. He completed his primary and secondary education at Sultan Omar Ali Saifuddien College before pursuing higher studies at the University of Hull, United Kingdom, where he graduated with a Bachelor of Science (Hons) in economics in 1978. In 1986, he earned a Certificate of Professional Studies from the Arthur D. Little School of Management in the United States, and in 1996, he attended a senior management program at the London Business School in the United Kingdom.

== Ministerial career ==
=== Early career ===
Abdul Rahman began his career in the Brunei government in 1992 as the director of financial institutions at the Ministry of Finance (MoF). He later served as the director of the economic planning unit at the same ministry in 1995, before becoming the director of budget in 1998. In 2000, he was appointed permanent secretary at the Ministry of Industry and Primary Resources, and in 2001, he returned to MoF in the same role while simultaneously holding the position of acting managing director of the Brunei Investment Agency.

As permanent secretary, Abdul Rahman was involved in various international discussions. On 26 June 2001, he met with Malaysia's Ng Yen Yen to explore joint tourism projects targeting Chinese tourists. The talks focused on a "double gold" package promoting visits to both Brunei and Malaysia, alongside potential collaborations with airlines for charter flights. In addition, he was appointed a board member of the Employees Trust Fund (Tabung Amanah Pekerja) for the term 2002–2004. On 11 December 2003, Abdul Rahman, alongside the sultan, met with Japanese authorities in Tokyo to discuss ASEAN–Japan relations and the further development of Brunei–Japan ties.

=== Deputy Minister of Finance ===
Abdul Rahman's ministerial career began on 20 September 2004, when he was appointed deputy minister of finance with the consent of Sultan Hassanal Bolkiah, succeeding Yakub Abu Bakar. Later, as chairman of Brunei Shell Marketing's board of directors, he oversaw the opening of the company's new headquarters in the PGGMB Building in Bandar Seri Begawan on 9 December.

=== Minister of Finance II ===
Abdul Rahman's brief tenure as deputy minister ended when he was promoted to minister of finance II in the 2005 Bruneian cabinet reshuffle on 24 May. In his role as acting minister of finance, he addressed the 13th ASEAN Customs Directors-General Meeting on 6 June, emphasising ASEAN Customs' role in fostering regional integration, combating money laundering, terrorism financing, and commercial fraud, and harmonising trade and investment. On 11 October, he urged the banking industry to support the growth of small and medium-sized businesses (SMEs)in Brunei by offering accessible financial plans to reduce the nation's dependence on the oil and gas sector and encourage expansion in other economic areas.

On 28 February 2006, Abdul Rahman called on gas station operators to prioritise local employment, noting that over 30% of the workforce consisted of foreign nationals. He also stressed the importance of adopting modern technology to enhance efficiency and safety. On 27 April, he represented Brunei at the Asian Development Bank's (ADB) official event in Manila, where the country became the 65th member, and exchanged documents with ADB President Haruhiko Kuroda. Later, on 25 May, he met with ketua kampungs and penghulus to discuss MoF's strategic plans, new laws, and initiatives such as Sukuk Al-Ijarah and the merger of two Islamic banks.

Abdul Rahman presented the Supply Bill for 2007/2008 at the LegCo meeting on 6 March 2007 at the International Convention Centre in Berakas. On the same day, he explained that the increase in the budget for the PMO was due to the special salary adjustment introduced in June 2006, the hiring of additional personnel, particularly in the police force, and several ongoing projects such as maintenance. He also announced the government's estimated income for the 2007/2008 financial year, projected at B$1.855 billion, primarily from the oil and gas sector, while forecasting a 2.6–3% growth despite fluctuations in global oil prices.

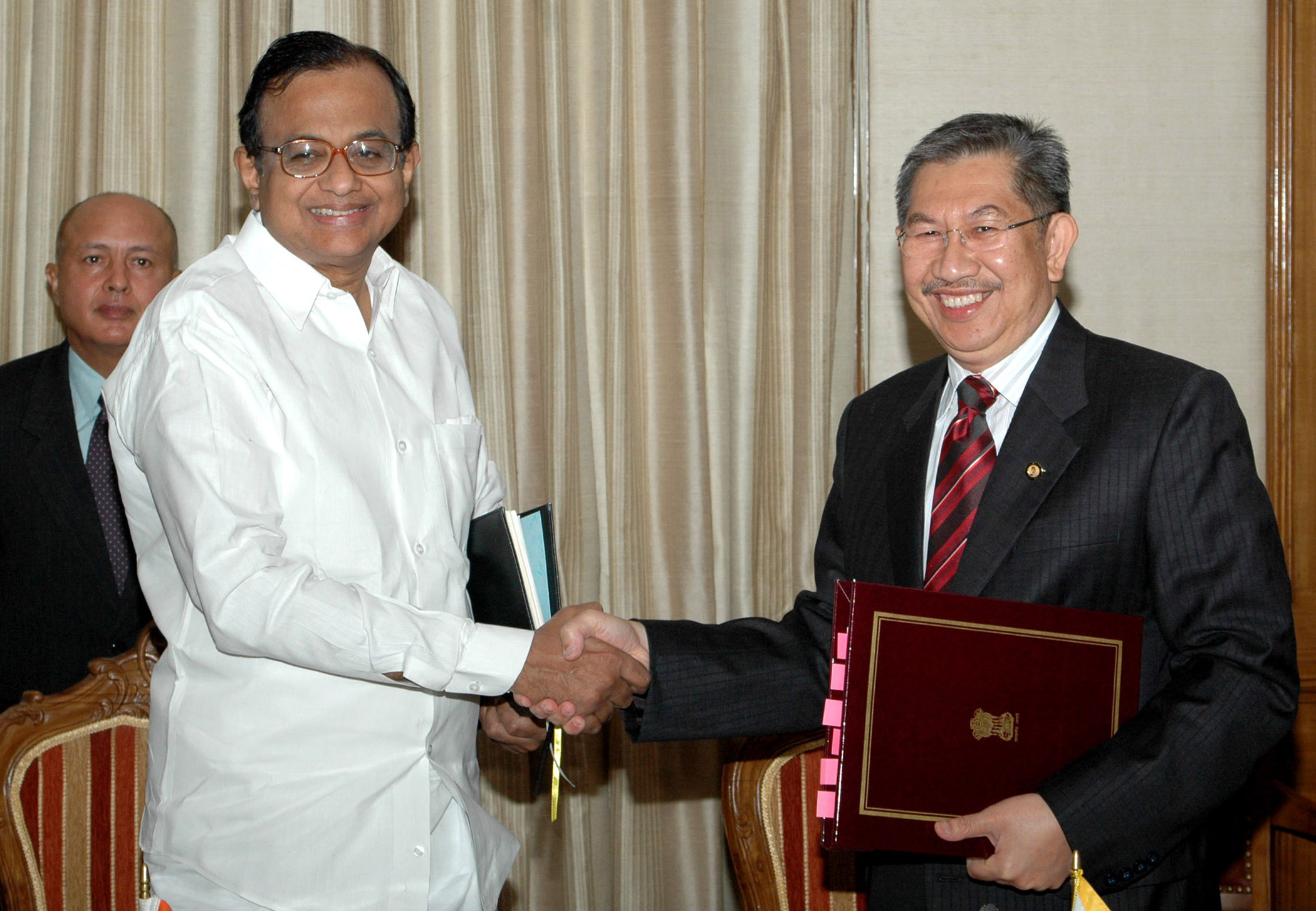
Chidambaram and Abdul Rahman exchanging the signed document of the 2008 agreement in New Delhi

The 2008 agreement between Brunei and India on investment promotion and protection was signed by Abdul Rahman and P. Chidambaram. Representing Brunei, he focused on promoting economic cooperation and safeguarding investments in both countries. The agreement ensures free fund flow, protection from expropriation, nondiscriminatory treatment, and outlines dispute resolution through arbitration. These measures, aimed at supporting economic progress, commercial ventures, and technology transfer, were largely formalised through his efforts.

On 15 March 2009, Abdul Rahman highlighted the 2010/2011 budget's emphasis on human resource development, poverty alleviation, and national security, stressing the importance of education, private sector growth, and reducing reliance on natural resources. He also underscored efforts to diversify the economy, reform taxation, and invest in human capital. Later, on 8 December, he commended Brunei's progress in global competitiveness, attributing the achievements to the sultan's leadership, while outlining initiatives to strengthen the financial sector, attract talent, and lower corporate taxes to boost investment. At the first International Conference on Islamic Finance in Gadong on 1 March 2010, Abdul Rahman further emphasised the need to uphold syariah principles, enhance governance, foster innovative financial products, and improve syariah compliance capabilities.

During the sixth session of LegCo on 15 March 2010, Abdul Rahman presented the 2010/2011 budget, focusing on defence, public safety, social welfare, poverty reduction, food security, private sector growth, and human capital development. The budget allocated $1.05 billion for disaster and pandemic response, offered tax breaks for SMEs, and aimed to boost local employment. He stressed the importance of reducing reliance on oil and gas by investing in infrastructure, education, and training, aligned with Wawasan Brunei 2035. The next day, he outlined pension payment options for retirees aged 70+ or with disabilities, including bank payments or appointing a representative. He also committed to exploring temporary payment centres. Abdul Rahman retained his role as minister of finance II after a cabinet reshuffle on 29 May.

On 2 March 2011, Abdul Rahman addressed the challenges of rice production and Brunei's reliance on imports, highlighting efforts to boost domestic crop production and explore partnerships with neighbouring countries to invest in overseas farms. During the seventh session of LegCo on 14 March, he cautioned against discussing currency interchangeability without careful consideration of its impact on public confidence and market stability. Responding to Goh King Chin, he noted the 43-year benefits of the Brunei–Singapore agreement in maintaining financial stability for economic growth. While acknowledging the effect of exchange rates on export competitiveness, he stressed the importance of prioritising currency stability and inflation management.

During the eighth session of LegCo on 4 March 2012, Abdul Rahman discussed the government's ongoing efforts since 1984 to improve civil servants' financial well-being through bonuses, pay raises, and allowances such as housing, education, and transport subsidies. He highlighted that Brunei's tax-free salaries and benefits provide better take-home pay compared to many countries. He noted that raising public sector pay by 10-15% would require substantial funding. On 8 March, he spoke about the Tekad Pemedulian Orang Ramai audit, launched in 2003, which has now been conducted in 24 departments, with improvements in client satisfaction from 49% in 2002 to 68% in 2011. He also mentioned initiatives like the CRM system and regular feedback sessions, and responded to a proposal for a universal emergency number. On 12 March, he addressed delays in payment claims, explaining that the necessary evaluations by various ministries were the cause. The Treasury Department reduced processing time from 14 to 5 days with the Treasury Accounting and Financial Information System, and a new invoice tracking system, still in trial, will be gradually implemented to address delays caused by documentation issues.

Abdul Rahman attended a royal audience at Istana Nurul Iman on 22 August 2013, where ministers and delegation leaders from Trans-Pacific Partnership member nations, as well as the Crown Prince and senior officials were present.

At the 10th session of LegCo on 13 March 2014, Abdul Rahman presented MoF's budget for the 2014–2015 fiscal year, focusing on priorities such as food security, public sector efficiency, and national financial management. He highlighted increased funding for salaries, recurring expenses, and special projects, including a $400 million bridge project linking Brunei–Muara and Temburong Districts. He also discussed the establishment of a Youth Entrepreneurship Centre in Kampong Jaya Setia. In May, Abdul Rahman became the 43rd Lee Kuan Yew Exchange Fellow, and in December, he signed three MoUs with South Korea in Seoul, covering agriculture, education, and fiscal matters, attended by both the sultan and President Park Geun-hye.

=== Minister at the Prime Minister's Office ===
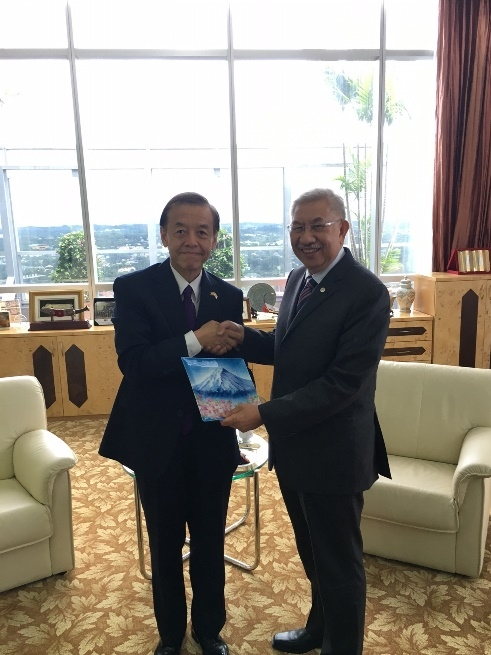
Motohiko Kato (left) and Abdul Rahman (right) in 2017

Abdul Rahman retained his position as minister of finance II after a cabinet reshuffle on 22 October 2015, which also involved the reassignment of several senior officials. In addition to this role, he was appointed as a minister at the PMO.

During the 12th LegCo session on 8 March 2016, Abdul Rahman announced that the Ministry of Defence would receive $451.79 million for the 2017–2018 fiscal year to enhance inter-agency cooperation, defence diplomacy, and military readiness, while stressing the importance of financial prudence and innovation in defence technology. The following day, he responded to Othman Uking's query on elder care, emphasising the duty of family members to care for aging parents and highlighting government support for those without family, including living allowances, housing, and healthcare. On 21 March, he introduced the Programme and Performance Budgeting method to improve ministry evaluations, with Salbiah Sulaiman stressing efficient fund usage in line with the sultan's advice on managing large budgets.

During the 13th session of LegCo on 7 March 2017, Abdul Rahman introduced the 2017/2018 Supply Bill, highlighting priorities such as prudent spending, productivity, business promotion, human capital development, and public welfare, with a proposed expenditure of $5.3 billion and a continuing budget deficit. He stressed the need to increase revenue and maintain fiscal discipline while improving education, healthcare, and business processes. On 20 March, he revealed that $461 million was owed to government agencies and urged lawmakers to promote timely fee payments. He also discussed efforts to diversify the economy, attract investment, support small businesses, and launched the i-RDY initiative to boost productivity and job prospects for local graduates. He concluded by emphasizing the importance of raising productivity for national growth.

Abdul Rahman's ministerial career came to an end following the cabinet reshuffle on 27 September 2018, which saw the replacement of six ministers, including himself.

== Legislative Councillor ==
=== 19th LegCo session ===
On 20 January 2023, Abdul Rahman was appointed to the new LegCo. During the 19th LegCo session on 4 March, he emphasized the importance of national cohesion in addressing global challenges such as pandemics, socioeconomic issues, and climate change. He highlighted the need for public trust and coordination among all parties, with a focus on digitisation, social assurance, unemployment, poverty reduction, education, and economic stability. He also noted that attracting foreign direct investments could positively impact regional companies. On 7 March, he discussed the allocation of funds for the PMO and related ministries for the 2023/2024 financial year, suggesting the creation of a platform to support MSMEs and young entrepreneurs.

=== 20th LegCo session ===
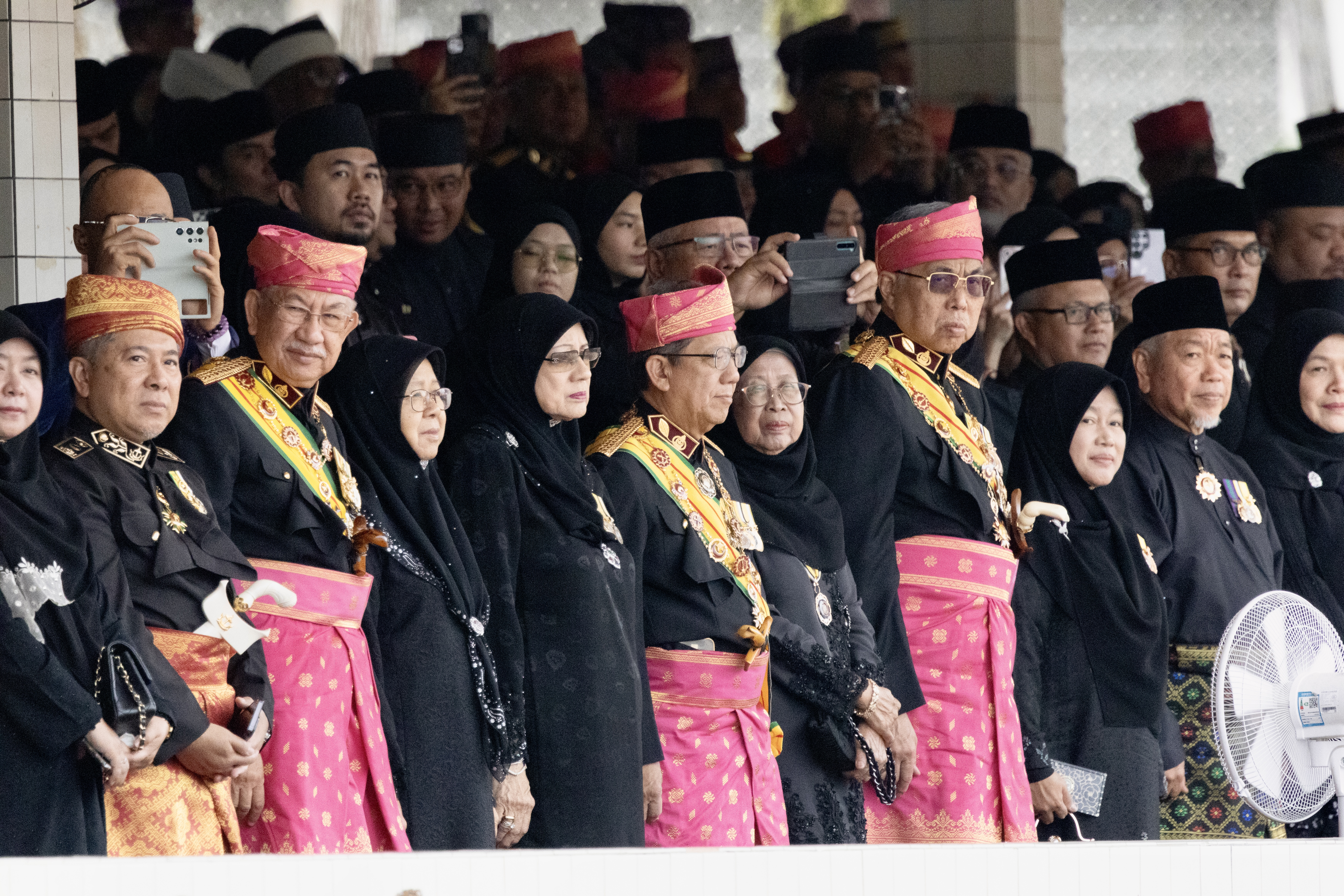
In court uniform, from left to right: Norarfan Zainal, Abdul Rahman, Suyoi Osman and Adanan Yusof in the 2024 sultan's birthday celebration

On 28 February 2024, Abdul Rahman called for a review of policies regarding foreign investors and Bruneians over 60, warning that the current approach could undermine investor trust and harm the economy, including job prospects. He highlighted the potential benefits of RKN 12 in improving living standards, economic growth, and attracting FDIs, and proposed issuing homestay permits or visas for up to ten years to boost international investment. On 7 March, during the LegCo session, he urged a more efficient halal certification process, with Abdul Manaf Metussin emphasising the Brunei Darussalam Food Authority's role in ensuring food safety and quality.

On 13 March 2024, Romaizah Mohd Salleh reported a decrease in student absenteeism in Brunei, with only 212 out of 75,835 students recorded as truant, citing factors like poor academic performance and lack of support. Since 2014, 864 students have benefited from the Education Loan Assistance Scheme, with 692 graduating, including 122 with first-class honours who are exempt from repayment. In response to a proposal to expand the loan scheme, she noted the current list meets national needs as per the Manpower Planning and Employment Council. On 14 March, he suggested flexible work hours for civil servants to better manage parental duties. In his adjournment speech on 23 March, he called for constructive feedback on policy formulation and emphasized transparency in Wawasan Brunei 2035 and the potential of RKN 12 to boost investor confidence.

== Personal life ==
Abdul Rahman is married to Datin Sapiah binti Haji Sabtu. They have three sons and two daughters, and the family resides in Jalan Pengiran Babu Raja, Kampong Kiarong.

== Titles, styles and honours ==
=== Titles and styles ===
On 10 April 2004, Abdul Rahman was honoured by Sultan Hassanal Bolkiah with the manteri title of Pehin Orang Kaya Laila Setia, bearing the style Yang Dimuliakan.

=== Honours ===
Abdul Rahman has been bestowed the following honours:

- Order of Setia Negara Brunei First Class (PSNB; 15 July 2006) – Dato Seri Setia
- Order of Seri Paduka Mahkota Brunei Second Class (DPMB) – Dato Paduka
- Sultan Hassanal Bolkiah Medal First Class (PHBS; 15 July 2010)
- Excellent Service Medal (PIKB)
- Long Service Medal (PKL)
- Proclamation of Independence Medal (10 March 1997)
- Sultan of Brunei Silver Jubilee Medal (5 October 1992)
- National Day Silver Jubilee Medal (23 February 2009)

Political offices
Preceded by Office established	1st Minister of Finance II; 22 October 2015 – 27 September 2018	Succeeded by Amin Liew Abdullah
Preceded by Yakub Abu Bakar	Deputy Minister of Finance; 20 September 2004 – 24 May 2005	Succeeded by Bahrin Abdullah
