= Hamdan Abu Bakar =

Bruneian politician and civil servant

Dato Seri Paduka Hamdan Abu Bakar SPMB DPMB
- همدان ابو بكر

Deputy Minister at the Prime Minister's Office
- In office 22 October 2015 – 27 September 2018 Serving with Roselan Daud
- Monarch: Hassanal Bolkiah
- Minister: Abdul Rahman Ibrahim; Lim Jock Seng
- Preceded by: Abdul Wahab Juned; Ali Apong
- Succeeded by: Elinda C.A. Mohammad

Personal details
- Born: Brunei
- Profession: Politician; civil servant

Hamdan bin Haji Abu Bakar is a retired Bruneian politician and civil servant who served as the Deputy Minister at the Prime Minister's Office (PMO) from 2015 to 2018.

== Career ==
In 1989, Hamdan started working for the Brunei Ministry of Foreign Affairs as a Diplomatic Officer. After working his way up, he was named Director of the Internal Security Department (ISD) in 2010. He was concurrently named the PMO's Permanent Secretary (Security and Enforcement) in December 2010.

Sultan Hassanal Bolkiah appointed Dato Hamdan as the Deputy Minister at the PMO after he announced a cabinet reshuffle on 22 October 2015. With effect on that same day, the Sultan approved his appointment as the director of the ISD. Complying with FATF Recommendation 1 requires conducting a National Risk Assessment on money laundering and terrorist financing. As Dato Hamdan pointed out in January 2016, Brunei's first NRA intends to identify and manage these risks through a year-long project and workshops.

On 28 March 2017, Dato Hamdan met with Singapore's Police Commissioner Hoong Wee Teck to discuss crime, safety issues, and the strong cooperation between the Royal Brunei Police Force and the Singapore Police Force. In Manado, Indonesia, from 28 to 29 July, Dato Hamdan participated in the Sub Regional Meeting on Foreign Terrorist Fighters and Cross-Border Terrorism where he shared the country's strategies and experience in countering terrorism and discussed regional cooperation on this issue with other participating countries.

In the presence of representatives from both nations, including Dato Hamdan, the Brunei Intellectual Property Office (BruIPO) and the Japan Patent Office (JPO) inked an agreement on 28 August 2017, to begin the Patent Prosecution Highway Plus (PPH+) program. The Third ASEAN Plus Japan Ministerial Meeting on Transnational Crime was called by the ASEAN Ministers and Japan on 21 September. It was co-chaired by the ministers of Japan, Hachiro Okonogi, and Brunei, Dato Hamdan, to discuss the conclusions of previous meetings of high-ranking officials on transnational crime.

On 30 January 2018, Brunei's monarch announced an unexpected cabinet reshuffle, leading to the stepping down of several long-serving ministers and the non-reappointment of Deputy Minister Dato Hamdan.

== Honours ==
Dato Hamdan has earned the following honours;

National

- Order of Seri Paduka Mahkota Brunei First Class (SPMB; 15 July 2017) – Dato Seri Paduka
- Order of Seri Paduka Mahkota Brunei Second Class (DPMB)

Foreign

- Singapore:
  - Meritorious Service Medal (PJG; 24 November 2015) (Note: Dato Hamdan has been instrumental in enhancing counter-terrorism cooperation and intelligence sharing between Brunei and Singapore, earning him the Meritorious Service Medal for his contributions to regional security.)

== Notes ==
Political offices
Preceded by Abdul Wahab Juned; Ali Apong	Deputy Minister at the Prime Minister's Office; 22 October 2015 – 27 September 2018	Succeeded by Elinda C.A. Mohammad
