= Eusoff Agaki Ismail =

Bruneian politician (born 1949)

Dato Seri Paduka Eusoff Agaki Ismail SPMB PHBS
- اييوسوفف اڬكي اسماعيل

Deputy Minister at the Prime Minister's Office
- In office 24 May 2005 – 18 November 2010
- Preceded by: Office established
- Succeeded by: Abdul Wahab Juned; Ali Apong

Personal details
- Born: 26 March 1949 (age 77) Brunei
- Spouse: Joanna Agaki
- Education: University of Hull (BA; MPhil); Harvard University (MPA)
- Occupation: Politician

Eusoff Agaki bin Haji Ismail (born 26 March 1949) is a retired Brunei politician who was appointed as the deputy minister at the Prime Minister's Office (PMO) from 2005 to 2010.

== Education ==
Eusoff Agaki graduated from Sultan Omar Ali Saifuddien College in class 1964, together with Sultan Hassanal Bolkiah, Abu Bakar Apong and Goh King Chin. Additionally, he has a Bachelor of Arts in Southeast Asian Studies from the University of Hull in the United Kingdom, a Master of Philosophy from the same institution, as well as a Master of Public Administration from Harvard University.

== Career ==
As Royal Customs and Excise's deputy controller, Eusoff Agaki began working for the Government of Brunei in 1974 and remained there until 1992. Following this, he worked for the Ministry of Finance before being named director of special duties on 1 November 1994, a position he maintained until 15 November 1995. He would then be named director of the ASEAN European Commission Management Center (AEMC). From roughly three and a half years until 25 May 1999, he served in this capacity. On that date, he was named acting special duty officer at the PMO. He rejoined the Royal Customs and Excise on 2 April 2000, and worked there as a controller for around five years.

Eusoff Agaki was appointed as Deputy Minister at the PMO on 24 May 2005, the day the sultan revealed Brunei's fourth cabinet. He co-currently serves as the director of the Internal Security Department (ISD). At the Centre for Strategic and Policy Studies (CSPS) in Gadong on 24 January 2008, the inaugural E-Government Leadership Forum (EGLF) of 2008 was held where he attended as the 'Executive owner' and the project's chairman in Brunei. From 25 to 27 February 2009, he attended the 3rd ASEAN Defence Ministers’ Meeting (ADMM) in Pattaya, Thailand. Ministers met informally with their colleagues outside of the gathering to discuss the state of their respective countries' defense cooperation and other matters of concern. He had separate bilateral discussions with Teo Chee Hean and Phùng Quang Thanh. Eusoff Agaki's tenure as deputy minister ended in the 2010 Bruneian cabinet reshuffle on 29 May.

== Books ==
- Haji Ismail, Eusoff Agaki (1991). Brunei Darussalam : its re-emergence as a sovereign and independent Malay-Muslim Sultanate. University of Hull.

== Honours ==
Eusoff Agaki has earned the following honours;

- Order of Seri Paduka Mahkota Brunei First Class (SPMB; 15 July 2006) – Dato Seri Paduka
- Order of Seri Paduka Mahkota Brunei Second Class (DPMB; 15 July 2003) – Dato Paduka
- Sultan Hassanal Bolkiah Medal (PHBS; 15 July 2006)

Political offices
| Preceded by Office established | Deputy Minister at The Prime Minister's Office; 24 May 2005 – 18 November 2010 | Succeeded by Abdul Wahab Juned; Ali Apong |
