= Abdul Wahab Juned =

Bruneian politician and civil servant (born 1949)

Dato Paduka Abdul Wahab Juned DPMB SMB SNB PSB PJK PIKB PKL
- عبدالوهاب جونيد

Deputy Minister at the Prime Minister's Office
- In office 29 May 2010 – 22 October 2015 Serving with Ali Apong
- Monarch: Hassanal Bolkiah
- Preceded by: Eusoff Agaki
- Succeeded by: Hamdan Abu Bakar; Roselan Daud

Personal details
- Born: 2 May 1949 (age 77) Setia Pahlawan Lama, Kampong Ayer, Brunei
- Spouse: Hasnah Apong
- Education: University of Salford (BSc); University of London (PCE); University of York (MSc); Universiti Brunei Darussalam (MA)
- Profession: Politician; civil servant

Abdul Wahab bin Juned (born 2 May 1949) is a politician and civil servant from Brunei who served as the country's Deputy Minister at the Prime Minister's Office (PMO) from 2010 to 2015. Additionally, he is a member of the Core Group of the Brunei Darussalam Economic Council (BDEC) and serves on committees focused on economic policy facilitation, infrastructure, finance, and the promotion of trade and services.

== Early life and education ==
Abdul Wahab bin Juned, born on 2 May 1949, is originally from Kampong Setia Pahlawan Lama, Kampong Ayer.

Abdul Wahab earned a Bachelor of Science (Hons) in Biology from the University of Salford on 10 July 1975, followed by a Postgraduate Certificate in Education from the University of London on 1 August 1978. He later completed a Master of Science in Biology and Biological Education from the University of York on 8 July 1983. Additionally, he obtained a Master of Arts in Public Policy from the Universiti Brunei Darussalam, studying from 3 August 1992 to 2 August 1993.

== Early career ==
Abdul Wahab has held various significant roles throughout his career, beginning as an education officer in the Education Department from 1975 to 1983. He then transitioned to administrative positions in the Brunei Administrative Service, serving in the Chief Minister and State Secretary Office, the Ministry of Development, and the Ministry of Education. His expertise further extended to the Ministry of Industry and Primary Resources, where he held senior administrative roles and became Director of the Brunei Industrial Development Agency (BINA) from 1995 to 1997. Additionally, he served as Chief Postmaster General from 1998 to 1999 and Director of Information at the Department of Information from 25 May 1999 to 19 March 2000.

He was named Director General of the BDEC Secretariat from 2000 to 2001, and his role there included supervising the council's national economic revitalisation measures following the 1997 Asian financial crisis. In 2001, he was appointed as the Permanent Secretary in the PMO, a position he held until his retirement from the public sector in 2004. After that, he briefly served as Permanent Secretary until 2005, after which he was appointed Chairman of the Public Service Commission (PSC) for a five-year term. With over 35 years of experience in various government roles, his last position before his current appointment was as Chairman of the PSC.

== Ministerial career ==
The appointment of Abdul Wahab as the Deputy Minister at the PMO in the 2010 Bruneian cabinet reshuffle on 29 May, marked a major change in his professional career. In order to explore bilateral programs covered under the Broadcasting MOU, such as cooperative TV and radio productions and student activities, he met with the group from Singapore in 2011. A delegation led by Singaporean MP Zaqy Mohamad paid him a courtesy call at the PMO on 25 June 2011, as part of their visit for the co-production of "Xpedisi Siswa" and "Titian Minda 2011" with MediaCorp Singapore.

On 12 September 2012, Abdul Wahab, in his welcoming remarks, highlighted the premier talk at the Knowledge Convention on the crucial role of women in family health, emphasising research on the role of parents in shaping a credible society. On 25 June 2013, he stressed at the Launching Ceremony of the Flag Waving Campaign the importance of displaying national pride through flag waving as a symbol of unity and love for the country, especially during celebrations like the Sultan's birthday, and warned against attitudes that could weaken national identity.

In order to track the development of the new extension building for the Information Department and the Anti-Corruption Bureau project under the 10th National Development Plan (RKN 10), Abdul Wahab went with Crown Prince Al-Muhtadee Billah on 28 May 2014. He underlined on 11 September, the value of civic engagement and consciousness in producing future leaders and preserving Bruneian identity. He emphasized that civic engagement is essential for successful leadership and comprehending community needs in addition to academic knowledge, highlighting the importance of cultural and societal values that should not be overlooked in spite of improvements in education and experience.

At the Civil Service Institute (IPA) on 8 August 2015, Abdul Wahab presided over the launch of Dewan Ittisal, a new e-learning and e-conference training hall designed to increase the availability of digital training resources for public workers. On 27 August, he stressed the importance of young people drawing inspiration and guidance from their parents, teachers, and national leaders to navigate life's complexities. He highlighted the need for education and socio-cultural values to counteract negative influences and urged students to balance their knowledge with Brunei's values, emphasising hard work, independence, and loyalty to the nation.

He was replaced as deputy minister by Hamdan Abu Bakar and Roselan Daud in a cabinet reshuffle ordered by Sultan Hassanal Bolkiah on 22 October 2015.

== Personal life ==
Abdul Wahab is married to Datin Hajjah Hasnah binti Haji Apong @ Abdul Rahman and has one daughter and one son. In his leisure time, he enjoys playing golf.

On 9 December 2012, Abdul Wahab, along with Ali Apong, greeted the Crown Prince at the Inter-Ministry Golf Tournament held at the Royal Brunei Golf and Country Club, where he won first prize in the VVIP category and also secured prizes for "nearest to pin" and "longest drive."

== Honours ==
Abdul Wahab has earned the following honours;

- Order of Seri Paduka Mahkota Brunei Second Class (DPMB; 15 July 2002) – Dato Paduka
- Order of Seri Paduka Mahkota Brunei Third Class (SMB; 1992)
- Order of Setia Negara Brunei Third Class (SNB; 1997)
- Order of Setia Negara Brunei Fourth Class (PSB; 1988)
- Meritorious Service Medal (PJK; 2000)
- Excellent Service Medal (PIKB; 1987)
- Long Service Medal (PKL; 1999)
- Proclamation of Independence Medal (1984)

Political offices
Preceded by Eusoff Agaki Ismail	Deputy Minister at the Prime Minister's Office; 29 May 2010 – 22 October 2015	Succeeded by Hamdan Abu Bakar; Roselan Daud
