= Elinda C.A. Mohammad =

Brunei politician

Datin Seri Paduka Elinda C.A. Mohammad SPMB
- ايليندا محمد

Deputy Minister at the Prime Minister's Office
- In office 30 January 2018 – 18 January 2020
- Monarch: Hassanal Bolkiah
- Minister: Isa Ibrahim; Abdul Mokti Daud
- Preceded by: Hamdan Abu Bakar; Roselan Daud
- Succeeded by: Riza Yunos; Sufian Sabtu

Personal details
- Born: Brunei
- Education: University of London (LLB); University of Malaya (CLP)
- Occupation: Politician; lawyer

Elinda binti Haji C.A. Mohammad is a retired politician and lawyer from Brunei who previously served as the Deputy Minister at the Prime Minister's Office (PMO) from 2018 to 2020, and Director of Anti-Corruption Bureau (ACB) in the same tenure.

== Education and early career ==
In 1988, Elinda graduated with honours from the University of London in the United Kingdom with an LL.B. in law. In 1988, she began her career in the Anti-Corruption Bureau of the Government of Brunei. Her Certificate in Legal Practice (CLP) was awarded by the University of Malaya in 1995. She was admitted to the Supreme Court of Brunei Darussalam as an advocate and solicitor in 1997, and she continued to practice till 31 December 2005. She began working in the ACB in 2006, where she handled legal and foreign affairs.

== Ministerial career ==
She was appointed on 3 November 2012, to serve as a Senior Special Duties Officer (Security, Law, and Welfare) in the Ministry of Home Affairs. She was appointed as the PMO's Permanent Secretary (Law & Welfare) and Director of ACB on 2 November 2017. She was appointed as the Deputy Minister of the PMO, following a cabinet reshuffle on 30 January 2018. The Sultan appointed Elinda and Romaizah, two women, to ministerial posts during the reorganization. Her position as director of the ACB may provide insight into the true cause of the Sultan's unannounced reorganisation.

=== Drug laws ===
According to Elinda, Brunei has reaffirmed its unwavering commitment to bolstering extra-regional and regional cooperation in the fight against transnational drug law with other ASEAN members. In her remarks during the 2018 Hanoi, Vietnam, 6th ASEAN Ministerial Meeting on Drug Matters (AMMD), she emphasised Brunei's implementation of a zero-tolerance policy for a drug-free nation, noting that it had yielded positive outcomes. Brunei adopted an approach to drug policy that involved the entire government and the entire country.

During the 62nd Commission of Narcotic Drugs (CND) in Vienna on 14 March 2019, she stated that Brunei has a comprehensive policy that addresses drug usage in particular and encompasses national security, health, and socioeconomic development. The nation recognises the need to bolster regulations in response to the worldwide rise in drug abuse, even as it attempts to retain control over the local drug problem. Public awareness campaigns are part of the approach, with a focus on informing the public about the possible risks associated with herbal products. In line with ASEAN's objective for a Drug-Free ASEAN, Brunei is committed to regional and global collaboration to combat transnational drug offenses. With a concerted effort against illicit drugs for a Drug-Free community at the national, regional, and international levels, the commitment to international collaboration is stressed in order to confront the mounting problems of the global and regional drug situation.

=== Termination ===
This notice complies with Sultan Hassanal Bolkiah's directive and states that, as of 18 January 2020, Elinda's services are no longer needed for her role as director of the ACB or as deputy minister in PMO.

== Honours ==
Elinda has earned the following honours:

- Order of Seri Paduka Mahkota Brunei First Class (SPMB; 15 July 2018) – Datin Seri Paduka
