= 2010 Bruneian cabinet reshuffle =

Brunei cabinet reshuffle undertaken by Hassanal Bolkiah

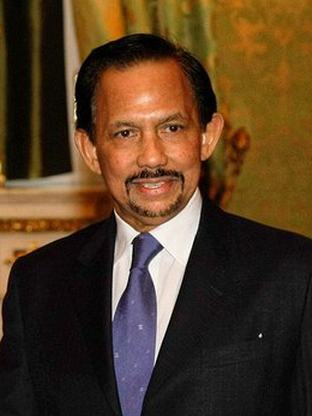
Hassanal Bolkiah

Hassanal Bolkiah carried out the fourth reshuffle of his government on 29 May 2010, appointing the first female deputy minister and replacing three ministers. The announcement was delivered during a televised speech at 3:50 pm. The previous cabinet had been reshuffled in 2005 for a five-year term, followed by the next one in 2015.

The cabinet reshuffle had modifications implemented were a minor step toward better governance, even though many ministers kept their jobs and the sultan still served as finance, defence, and the prime ministership. The nation's first female cabinet member, Adina Othman, was appointed deputy minister of culture, youth and sports in the new administration. Four deputy ministers were sworn in as new cabinet ministers, and three existing ministers kept their current portfolios.

According to the sultan's televised speech, the cabinet reshuffle aimed to enhance efficiency, foster dynamic leadership, and align with national objectives. It was significant for the appointment of Brunei's first female attorney general and deputy minister, reflecting the sultan's commitment to gender inclusion. By combining experienced leaders with fresh talent, the reshuffle sought to drive economic growth and competitiveness. However, Jane's Intelligence suggested that the reshuffle was an effort to replace conservative ministers with a more corporate and technically experienced team. Despite ongoing concerns about restrictions on freedoms and gender discrimination, as noted in the U.S. Department of State's 2009 Human Rights Report, Brunei has made gradual progress in women's rights, including the removal of a policy requiring female civil servants to resign upon marriage and the appointment of high-profile women to leadership positions.

On 9 June 2010, members of the newly formed cabinet were sworn in for a five-year term during a ceremony at the palace. On 8 July, the sultan chaired the first cabinet meeting following the reshuffle, which was also held at the palace.

== Cabinet-level changes ==
Colour key
- Joined the Cabinet
- Left the Cabinet

| Minister | Position before reshuffle | Result of reshuffle |
|---|---|---|
| Hazair Abdullah | Deputy Minister of Health | Became Minister of Culture, Youth and Sports |
| Abu Bakar Apong | Minister of Communications | Became Minister of Education |
| Abdullah Bakar | Minister of Development | Became Minister of Communications |
| Mohammad Daud | Minister of Energy at the Prime Minister's Office | Left the government |
| Suyoi Osman | Minister of Health | Became Minister of Development |
| Badaruddin Othman | Deputy Minister of Religious Affairs | Became Minister of Home Affairs |
| Pengiran Mohammad | Deputy Minister of Education | Became Minister of Religious Affairs |
| Zain Serudin | Minister of Religious Affairs | Left the government |
| Abdul Rahman Taib | Minister of Education | Left the government |
| Yasmin Umar | Deputy Minister of Defence | Became Minister of Energy at the Prime Minister's Office |
| Adanan Yusof | Minister of Home Affairs | Became Minister of Health |

== Junior ministerial changes ==
Colour key
- Joined the Cabinet
- Left the Cabinet

| Minister | Position before reshuffle | Result of reshuffle |
|---|---|---|
| Bahrin Abdullah | Permanent Secretary at the Ministry of Finance | Became Deputy Minister of Finance |
| Hamdillah Abdul Wahab | Deputy Minister of Industry and Primary Resources | Left the government |
| Ali Apong | Permanent Secretary at the Prime Minister's Office | Became Deputy Minister of Development |
| Dani Ibrahim | Deputy Minister of Home Affairs | Left the government |
| Eusoff Agaki Ismail | Deputy Minister at the Prime Minister's Office | Left the government |
| Yusoff Ismail | Member of the Public Service Commission | Became Deputy Minister of Education |
| Abdul Wahab Juned | None | Became Deputy Minister at the Prime Minister's Office |
| Halbi Mohammad Yussof | High Commissioner of Brunei to Malaysia | Became Deputy Minister of Home Affairs |
| Adina Othman | Director of Community Development (Note: Non-ministerial position) | Became Deputy Minister of Culture, Youth and Sports |
| Mustappa Sirat | Permanent Secretary I at the Ministry of Defence | Became Deputy Minister of Defence |
| Pengiran Bahrom | Deputy Permanent Secretary at the Ministry of Religious Affairs | Became Deputy Minister of Religious Affairs |

== Later changes ==
The sultan ordered the Brunei Economic Development Board (BEDB) and the Department of Economic Planning and Development to be placed under the Prime Minister's Office, appointing Ali Apong as deputy minister and chairman of BEDB, replacing Timothy Ong, effective 18 November 2010.

Colour key
- Joined the Cabinet
- Left the Cabinet

| Minister | Position before reshuffle | Result of reshuffle | Effective from |
|---|---|---|---|
| Ali Apong | Deputy Minister of Development | Became Deputy Minister at the Prime Minister's Office | 18 November 2010 |
