= 2015 Bruneian cabinet reshuffle =

Brunei cabinet reshuffle undertaken by Hassanal Bolkiah

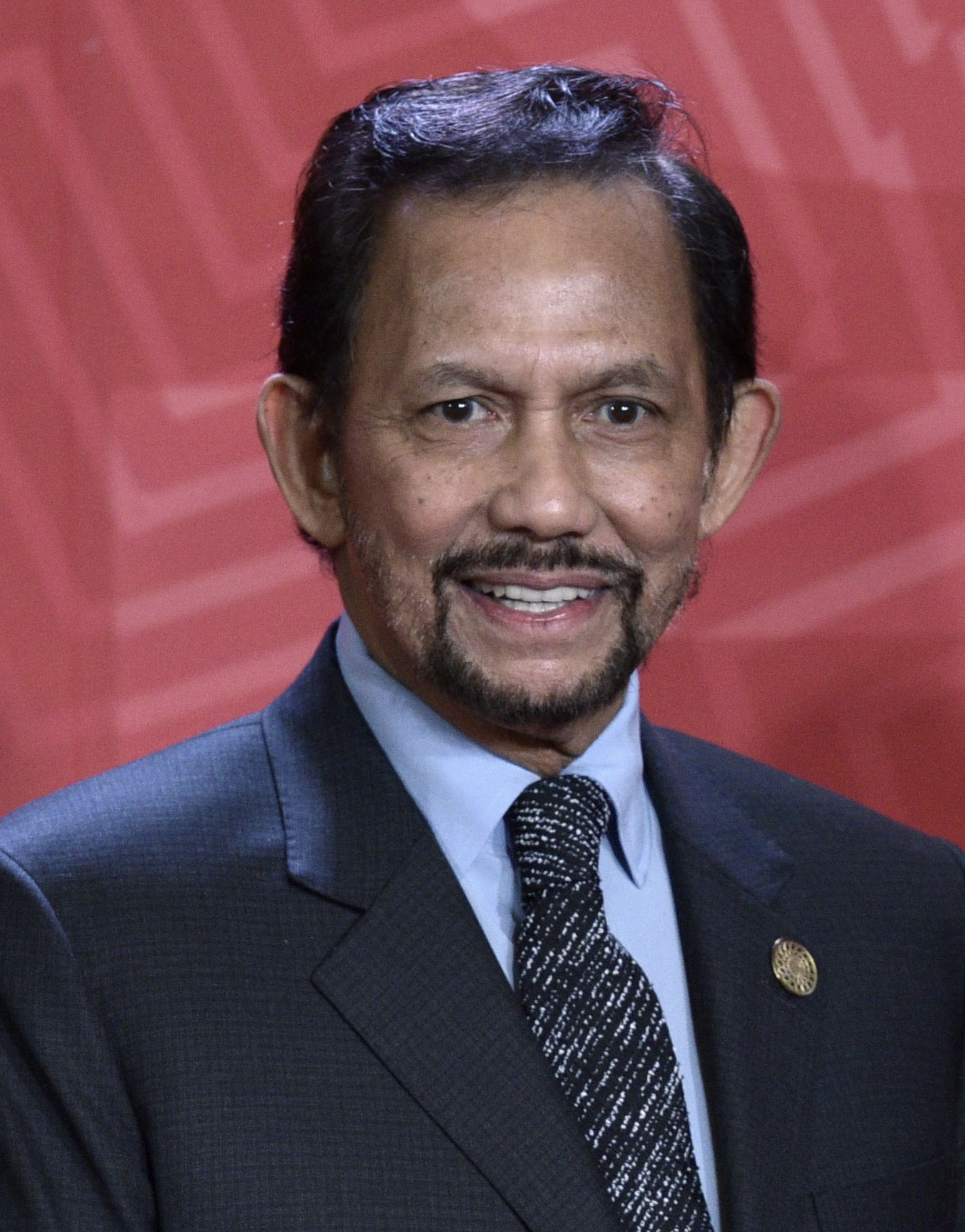
Hassanal Bolkiah

Hassanal Bolkiah carried out the fifth reshuffle of his government on 22 October 2015, replacing nine cabinet ministers. The announcement was delivered during a televised speech at 2:20 pm. The previous cabinet had been reshuffled in 2010 for a five-year term, followed by the next one in 2018.

Most notably, the sultan appointed himself as minister of trade and foreign affairs, a role previously held by his brother, Prince Mohamed Bolkiah, since 1984. The 2015 cabinet reshuffle further consolidated the sultan's authority, with him taking over the foreign affairs and trade portfolio following his brother's retirement. Simultaneously, the sultan retained control of key portfolios, including finance, defence, and the prime ministership. This reorganisation represented a significant step in centralising power within the monarchy, with Crown Prince Al-Muhtadee Billah being the only remaining direct member of the royal family in the new administration as the senior minister at the Prime Minister's Office (PMO).

A possible reason for the cabinet reshuffle could be the sultan's emphasis on the importance of effective governance in fostering the nation's gratitude. During the televised announcement, he highlighted the critical role of the government and its machinery—comprising leaders, officials, and employees—stating that justice is the cornerstone of all good deeds. The sultan warned that without justice, welfare and blessings would inevitably diminish, which could have influenced his decision to reorganise the cabinet and reinforce the centralisation of power.

On 26 October 2015, members of the newly formed cabinet were sworn in for a five-year term during a ceremony at the palace. Three days later, on 29 October, the sultan chaired the first cabinet meeting following the reshuffle, which was also held at the palace.

== Cabinet-level changes ==
Colour key
- Joined the Cabinet
- Left the Cabinet

Minister	Position before reshuffle	Result of reshuffle
Bahrin Abdullah	Deputy Minister of Finance	Became Minister of Development
Hazair Abdullah	Minister of Culture, Youth and Sports	Left the government
Abu Bakar Apong	Minister of Education	Became Minister of Home Affairs
Ali Apong	Deputy Minister at the Prime Minister's Office	Became Minister of Primary Resources and Tourism
Abdullah Bakar	Minister of Communications	Left the government
Yahya Bakar	Minister of Primary Resources and Tourism	Left the government
Zulkarnain Hanafi	Permanent Secretary (Higher Education) at the Ministry of Education	Became Minister of Health
Hassanal Bolkiah	Prime Minister of Brunei; Minister of Defence; Minister of Finance	Prime Minister of Brunei; Minister of Defence; Minister of Finance; Minister of Foreign Affairs
Abdul Rahman Ibrahim	Minister of Finance II	Became Minister of Finance II and Minister at the Prime Minister's Office
Lim Jock Seng	Minister of Foreign Affairs and Trade II	Became Minister of Foreign Affairs and Trade II and Minister at the Prime Minister's Office
Prince Mohamed Bolkiah	Minister of Foreign Affairs and Trade	Left the government
Halbi Mohammad Yussof	Deputy Minister of Home Affairs	Became Minister of Culture, Youth and Sports
Suyoi Osman	Minister of Development	Became Minister of Education
Badaruddin Othman	Minister of Home Affairs	Became Minister of Religious Affairs
Pengiran Mohammad	Minister of Religious Affairs	Left the government
Mustappa Sirat	Deputy Minister of Defence	Became Minister of Communications
Adanan Yusof	Minister of Health	Left the government

== Junior ministerial changes ==
Colour key
- Joined the Cabinet
- Left the Cabinet

Minister	Position before reshuffle	Result of reshuffle
Hamdan Abu Bakar	Permanent Secretary (Security and Enforcement) at the Prime Minister's Office	Became Deputy Minister at the Prime Minister's Office
Amin Liew Abdullah	Finance and Business Development Director of Progen Holdings (Note: Non-government position)	Became Deputy Minister of Finance
Abdul Mokti Daud	Ambassador of Brunei to Saudi Arabia	Became Deputy Minister of Religious Affairs
Roselan Daud	Permanent Secretary at the Prime Minister's Office	Became Deputy Minister at the Prime Minister's Office
Suhaimi Gafar	Permanent Secretary (Technical and Professional) at the Minister of Development	Became Deputy Minister of Development
Yusoff Ismail	Deputy Minister of Education	Left the government
Abdul Wahab Juned	Deputy Minister at the Prime Minister's Office	Left the government
Hisham Hanifah	Permanent Secretary (Policy and Investment) at the Ministry of Finance	Became Deputy Minister of Finance
Abdul Aziz Mohd Tamit	Commander of the Royal Brunei Navy	Became Deputy Minister of Defence
Adina Othman	Deputy Minister of Culture, Youth and Sports	Left the government
Pengiran Bahrom	Deputy Minister of Religious Affairs	Became Deputy Minister of Education
Erywan Yusof	Permanent Secretary at the Ministry of Foreign Affairs and Trade	Became Deputy Minister of Foreign Affairs and Trade

== Later changes ==
Between the 2015 and 2018 cabinet reshuffles, several minor changes were introduced. On 21 September 2017, the PMO announced that Kamaluddin Bungsu had been appointed permanent secretary, and Jamain Julaihi was named deputy minister (energy) and industry. Later, on 1 December 2017, Zulkarnain Hanafi was replaced as minister of health in a minor cabinet reshuffle, marking the first such change since 2015. A swearing-in ceremony for the new health minister, Isham Jaafar, whose appointment took effect on the same day as Zulkarnain's dismissal, was held at the palace on 4 December.

Colour key
- Joined the Cabinet
- Left the Cabinet

Minister	Position before reshuffle	Result of reshuffle	Effective from
Jamain Julaihi	Permanent Secretary (Downstream and Power) at the Prime Minister's Office	Became Deputy Minister (Energy) and Industry at the Prime Minister's Office	21 September 2017
Zulkarnain Hanafi	Minister of Health	Left the government	1 December 2017
Isham Jaafar	Medical Director of Jerudong Park Medical Centre (Note: Non-ministerial position)	Became Minister of Health	1 December 2017
