= Suyoi Osman =

Bruneian civil servant and politician (born 1952)

Yang Dimuliakan Pehin Orang Kaya Indera Pahlawan Dato Seri Setia Suyoi Osman PSNB DPMB PSB PJK PIKB PKL
- سويوا عثمان
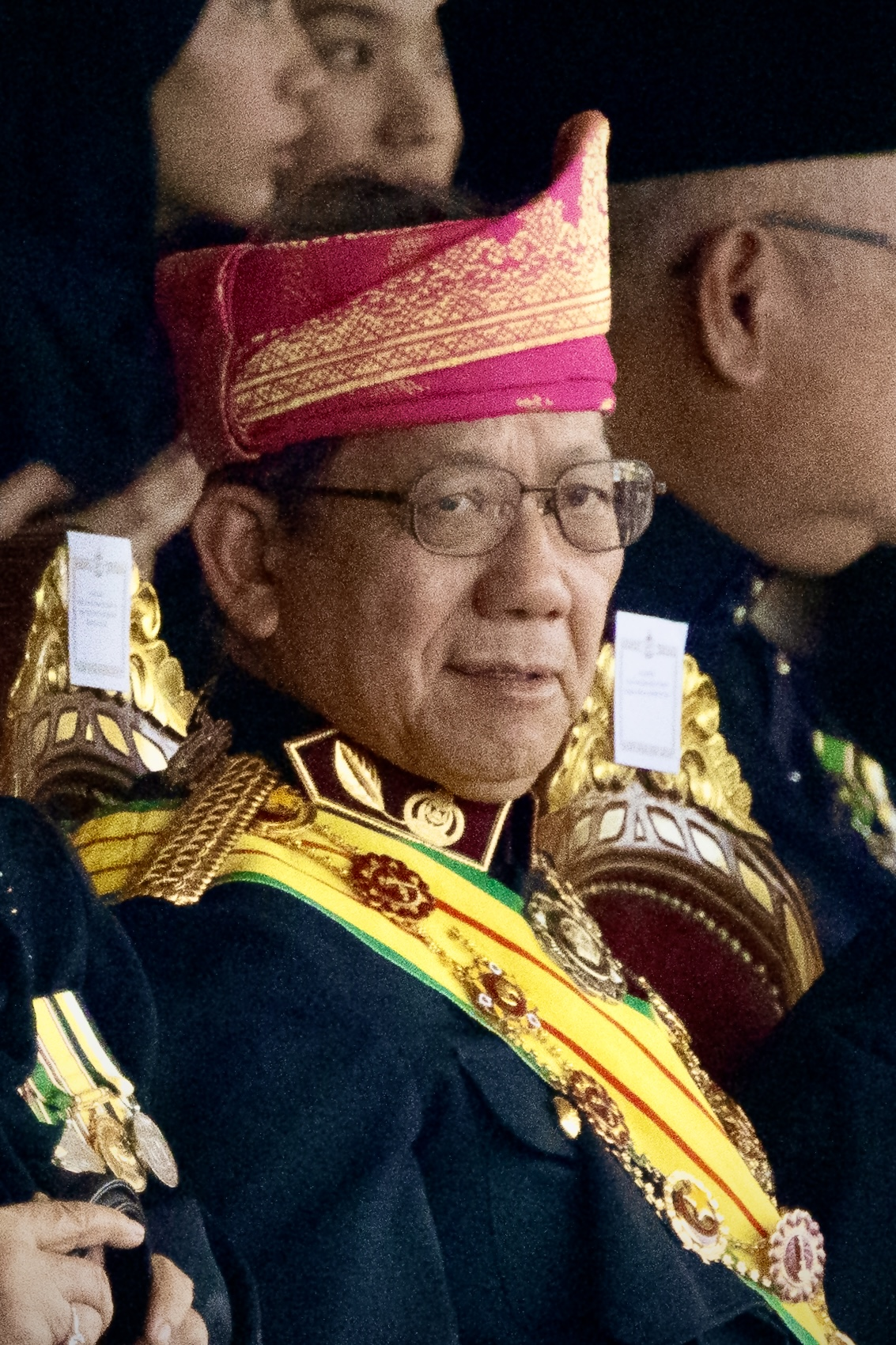
- Suyoi in 2024

Member of Legislative Council
- Incumbent
- Assumed office 20 January 2023

4th Minister of Education
- In office 22 October 2015 – 29 January 2018
- Monarch: Hassanal Bolkiah
- Deputy: Pengiran Bahrom
- Preceded by: Abu Bakar Apong
- Succeeded by: Hamzah Sulaiman

4th Minister of Development
- In office 29 May 2010 – 22 October 2015
- Deputy: Ali Apong
- Preceded by: Abdullah Bakar
- Succeeded by: Bahrin Abdullah

4th Minister of Health
- In office 24 May 2005 – 28 May 2010
- Deputy: Hazair Abdullah
- Preceded by: Abu Bakar Apong
- Succeeded by: Adanan Yusof

2nd Deputy Minister of Education
- In office 4 May 2002 – 24 May 2005
- Minister: Abdul Aziz Umar
- Preceded by: Ahmad Jumat
- Succeeded by: Pengiran Mohammad

Brunei Ambassador to France
- In office 7 October 1991 – 10 July 1996
- Preceded by: Pengiran Mustapha
- Succeeded by: Pengiran Idris

Personal details
- Born: 15 February 1952 (age 73) Kuala Belait, Belait, Brunei
- Education: Anthony Abell College
- Alma mater: University of East Anglia (BA); University of London; Johns Hopkins University (MPP)
- Profession: Civil servant; diplomat; politician

Suyoi bin Haji Osman (born 15 February 1952) is a Bruneian aristocrat, civil servant and politician who serve as a member of the Legislative Council of Brunei (LegCo) since 2023. He has formerly held office as the Brunei ambassador to France from 1991 to 1996, deputy minister of education from 2002 to 2005, minister of health from 2005 to 2010, minister of development from 2010 to 2015, minister of education from 2015 to 2018, and as minister of health from 2010 to 2015.

While leading the Ministry of Education (MoE), Suyoi introduced initiatives like the Brunei Darussalam National Standards for Literacy and Numeracy and the Literacy and Numeracy Coaching Program to enhance student outcomes, improve teaching quality, and strengthen school leadership. Under his leadership, Universiti Brunei Darussalam partnered with FPT University to establish the UBD–FPT Global Center in Da Nang, Sultan Sharif Ali Islamic University launched its Centre for Leadership and Lifelong Learning, and University of Technology Brunei achieved a four-star rating in the QS Evaluation.

== Early life and education ==
Suyoi bin Haji Osman was born on 15 February 1952 in Kuala Belait, a town in the Belait District. He began his early education at Anthony Abell College, completing his studies there in 1973. He later pursued higher education at the University of East Anglia, earning a Bachelor of Arts in development studies in 1975, followed by a Certificate in Education from the University of London. In 1986, he obtained a Master of Public Policy from the Paul H. Nitze School of Advanced International Studies at Johns Hopkins University.

== Ministerial career ==
=== Early career ===
Suyoi began his career as an education officer in 1976 before transitioning to the diplomatic service in 1982. He later served as deputy permanent representative of Brunei Darussalam to the United Nations in New York from 1987 to 1991. Following this, he was appointed as Brunei ambassador to France, a position he held from 1991 to 1995. In 1996, he became the director of the Research Department at the Ministry of Foreign Affairs and was appointed permanent secretary at the ministry in 1998. On 15 November 2000, during the APEC meeting at the International Convention Centre (ICC), Suyoi and Alexander Losyukov signed the Bilateral Consultation Protocol between Brunei and Russia to strengthen ties and foster collaboration in shared areas of interest.

=== Deputy Minister of Education ===
Suyoi's ministerial career began on 9 August 2002, when he was appointed deputy minister of education with the approval of Sultan Hassanal Bolkiah.

On 21 January 2003, he delivered a speech at the opening of the 2003 International Conference on the Use of English in Trade and Technology, underscoring the importance of integrating English and Malay in secondary education to promote cultural heritage, foster bilingualism, and drive economic and scientific progress. On 4 June, Suyoi highlighted the government's B$20.7 million investment in computerisation projects since 1999, emphasising efforts to connect schools to the information highway with high-quality computers, software, and qualified teachers. He also inaugurated the ICDL Testing Centre at SEAMEO-VOCTECH, reinforcing the alignment of ICT, e-government, and e-education initiatives. He was also instrumental in the founding of Sports School in 2003.

On 11 January 2004, Suyoi took part in a walkathon to raise funds for the Iraq Humanitarian Aid Fund, which saw nearly 6,000 participants, including government officials and private sector organisations, and he donated $18,177.80 raised from students, teachers, and government employees. On 5 July, during the Career Resource Centre launch, he stressed the value of optimism, perseverance, and work experience for growth, warned that frequent job changes may indicate poor adaptability, and urged the corporate sector to post job openings to support the centre’s career development goals. On 6 December, Suyoi chaired the 50th Technical and Physical Fitness Meeting and the 41st ASEAN Schools Sports Council Steering Committee Meeting, announcing Brunei as the host of the ASEAN Schools Golf Championship in June 2005 and expressing optimism about the meetings' impact on regional sports development.

In 2005, Wasan Vocational School and Business School was established during his term.

=== Minister of Health ===
In the 2005 Bruneian cabinet reshuffle on 24 May, Suyoi was appointed and promoted to minister of health by royal order as part of a cabinet reshuffle. Later that month, on the 30th, all cabinet ministers, including Suyoi, were summoned by Sultan Hassanal Bolkiah to take the oath at Istana Nurul Iman. Later that year, he addressed strategies for tackling both chronic and non-chronic illnesses, especially in light of the potential avian flu epidemic, sharing insights from the 6th Global Health Promotion Conference in Bangkok. During the conference, the Bangkok Charter was adopted to improve public health and empower individuals, and discussions also included plans for a regional "central bank" to store the avian flu drug oseltamivir, alongside calls for nations to contribute to a fund for the cause.

On 30 April 2006, Suyoi outlined the Ministry of Health's plans to alleviate the strain on RIPAS, including proposals for a new hospital or one for women and children, the completion of seven new operating rooms, ongoing construction at RIPAS, and improvements to hospitals in Kuala Belait, Tutong, and Temburong. On 22 May, during the World Health Organization's World Health Assembly, he was appointed as one of its vice presidents. Later, on 19 August, he led the groundbreaking ceremony for a new $3 million health centre in Sungai Liang, part of the 8th National Development Plan (RKN), with completion expected by the end of the following year.

Suyoi and Egypt's Health Minister Hatem El-Gabaly met on 27 January 2007, to discuss healthcare cooperation. The topics of discussion included food control, environmental regulations, cooperation on avian influenza, medical professional training, study opportunities for Bruneians in Egypt, and employment for Egyptian doctors in Brunei. On 9 February, he and Singapore's Health Minister Khaw Boon Wan inked an MoU to expand collaboration in healthcare areas such zoonoses, disease prevention, and medical research. Later on 29 May, he stated that although there are only 32 people living with AIDS in Brunei, the number is nevertheless alarming considering the size and population of the nation.

Suyoi led the groundbreaking ceremony on 25 August for the new health centre in Pekan Muara, which is 3.34 acres (1.35 ha) in size and has a two-story building. It will cost $4.6 million and serve over 23,000 people. Along with Crown Prince Al-Muhtadee Billah and other high-ranking government officials, Suyoi attended the official launch of the Integrated Health Screening and Health Promotion for Civil Servants Program on 5 September, which marked Brunei's 100th anniversary of health services. He emphasised the significance of health screenings, awareness campaigns, and MoH's efforts in preventative healthcare to address rising chronic diseases, high blood pressure, and kidney problems.

On 6 May 2009, Suyoi confirmed that Brunei remained free from the H1N1 flu virus and underscored the importance of increased precautions, such as isolating the ill and visitors from affected countries, using thermal scanners at airports, temporarily halting pork imports from high-risk nations, and boosting the stock of Tamiflu to cover 40% of the population. On 5 November, he announced that Brunei had received an initial shipment of 1,500 H1N1 vaccine doses, with 4,500 more on the way. By mid-December, 476,000 doses would be distributed, prioritising frontline workers and those with chronic conditions. He also reported 1,170 confirmed H1N1 cases in Brunei, with no hospitalised patients. In his World AIDS Day address on 1 December, Suyoi reiterated Brunei's commitment to providing free healthcare, including access to antiretroviral drugs, and discussed collaborative efforts to prevent and address HIV/AIDS, focusing on awareness programs and preventing mother-to-child transmission, while emphasising the need for ongoing vigilance amid rising rates of sexual transmission among the youth.

=== Minister of Development ===
As part of a cabinet reshuffle, Suyoi was appointed minister of development in the 2010 Bruneian cabinet reshuffle on 29 May, with his oath-taking ceremony following on 9 June. On 23 June, he announced plans to construct 10,000 homes by 2012 and an additional 7,500 by 2014 in collaboration with the Brunei Economic Development Board. He proposed "vertical development" housing post-2012 to optimise land use, acknowledging that it would address only half the demand. Speaking at the Land Department's 50th anniversary, he highlighted the Strata Titles Act (2009), which enables strata ownership under the RPN and STKRJ schemes, and called for progressive strategies to improve land management and planning. From 7 to 10 December, Suyoi led Brunei's delegation to the Cancún Climate Change Conference, where he underscored the nation's commitment to climate action. He highlighted measures such as improved drainage systems, flood mitigation, solar energy promotion, conserving 58% of forests under the Heart of Borneo initiative, and reducing energy use by 25% from 2005 to 2030. Suyoi also expressed hope for meaningful progress in global post-Kyoto climate negotiations.

In January 2011, Suyoi announced plans to build more homes under the RPN and STKRJ. He also confirmed that, with the sultan's approval, the Ministry of Development (MoD) would begin a project to restore and revitalise Kampong Ayer, aiming to make it more comfortable and in line with efforts to make Brunei the "most liveable" nation, with 56 homes to be completed in the project's first phase that year. Suyoi attended the 11th Meeting of the Sub-Regional Ministerial Steering Committee (MSC) on Transboundary Haze Pollution in Singapore on 17 February, where Brunei, Malaysia, Singapore, Thailand, and Indonesia made agreements to mitigate transboundary haze, including discussions on peatland management, early warning systems, and strategic studies to address fire-induced haze during the dry season. Suyoi highlighted at the 29th ASEAN Federation of Engineering Organisations Conference on 29 November that 50–80% of GDP in many countries comes from urban industrial and commercial activity, stressing the need to balance environmental preservation with urban development for better future quality of life.

During the ministry's sports festival on 21 January 2012, Suyoi raised concerns over the rising rates of obesity and overweight, citing a 2001 WHO report, and highlighted the increasing prevalence of non-communicable diseases such as diabetes, heart disease, cancer, and hypertension. He urged the adoption of healthier lifestyle choices, including a balanced diet and regular exercise. On 18 February, he launched the Further Learning Program for civil engineering graduates, aimed at enhancing Bruneian engineers' skills for national development in line with Wawasan Brunei 2035, stressing the importance of professional growth, adapting to new technologies, and embracing lifelong learning. In November 2012, Suyoi once again highlighted MoD's efforts to improve the quality of life in Kampong Ayer through the Upgrading Kampong Ayer Pilot Project, which includes constructing new homes, improving infrastructure, and promoting sustainable living practices.

On 5 March 2013, Suyoi inaugurated a pedestrian bridge on Jalan Pusar Ulak Radial Road, part of a project aimed at improving pedestrian safety near schools in Brunei. He also visited other key infrastructure projects, including the installation of a traffic signal system at Kiarong and the construction of a road and bridge to alleviate traffic congestion between Gadong and government complexes. On 17 July, he represented Brunei at the 15th Meeting of the Sub-Regional MSC on Transboundary Haze in Kuala Lumpur, where he expressed concerns about the rising number of hotspots in Borneo and Sumatra, called for stronger measures to address the issue, particularly during the dry season, and highlighted the importance of improved early warning systems and preparedness for future fires, while reaffirming Brunei's support for regional cooperation and initiatives to enhance fire control and reduce haze pollution.

On 24 February 2014, Suyoi discussed Brunei's progress over 30 years, focusing on advancements in housing and infrastructure, and highlighted ongoing projects to secure water supply, improve roads, interchanges, and bridges, tackle flooding, and increase housing availability, particularly in rural areas. On 12 March, he provided an update on the Belait Sixth Form Centre project in Mumong, which was halted due to a roof collapse, and the ongoing investigation and 'Stopped Work Order'. On 7 August, he attended the signing ceremony for the RPN Lugu housing project, overseen by Bina Puri Brunei, which, costing over $109 million, will provide 1,000 cluster homes and various public facilities. On 30 December, Suyoi visited the 91% completed 'Coastal Pipe Project', which aims to improve water supply through a 60-kilometre (37 mi) pipeline from Bukit Barun to Brunei–Muara, and inspected the flyover construction between Jalan Berakas and the Muara–Tutong Highway.

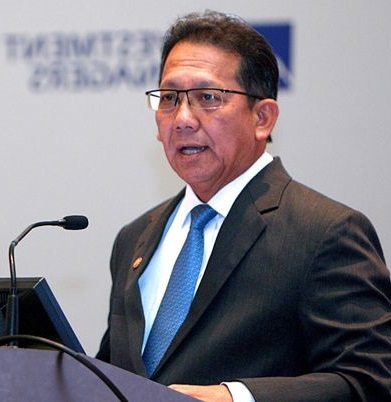
Suyoi speaking in 2015

In addition to giving updates on the status of the Temburong Bridge and Jalan Residency projects, Suyoi addressed complaints regarding delays in property title processing on 16 March 2015 and claimed that innovations, such as "simulating" procedures, would expedite duties like land subdivision and name changes. On 19 October, he discussed plans for a stock market, reforms to investor and legal frameworks, and emphasised Brunei's economic stability, while highlighting regulatory advancements and financial literacy programs, and expressing optimism about Brunei's success despite global economic concerns.

=== Minister of Education ===
On 22 October 2015, Suyoi was appointed as minister of education following a broader cabinet reshuffle, with several senior officials being reassigned, and he succeeded Ahmad Jumat.

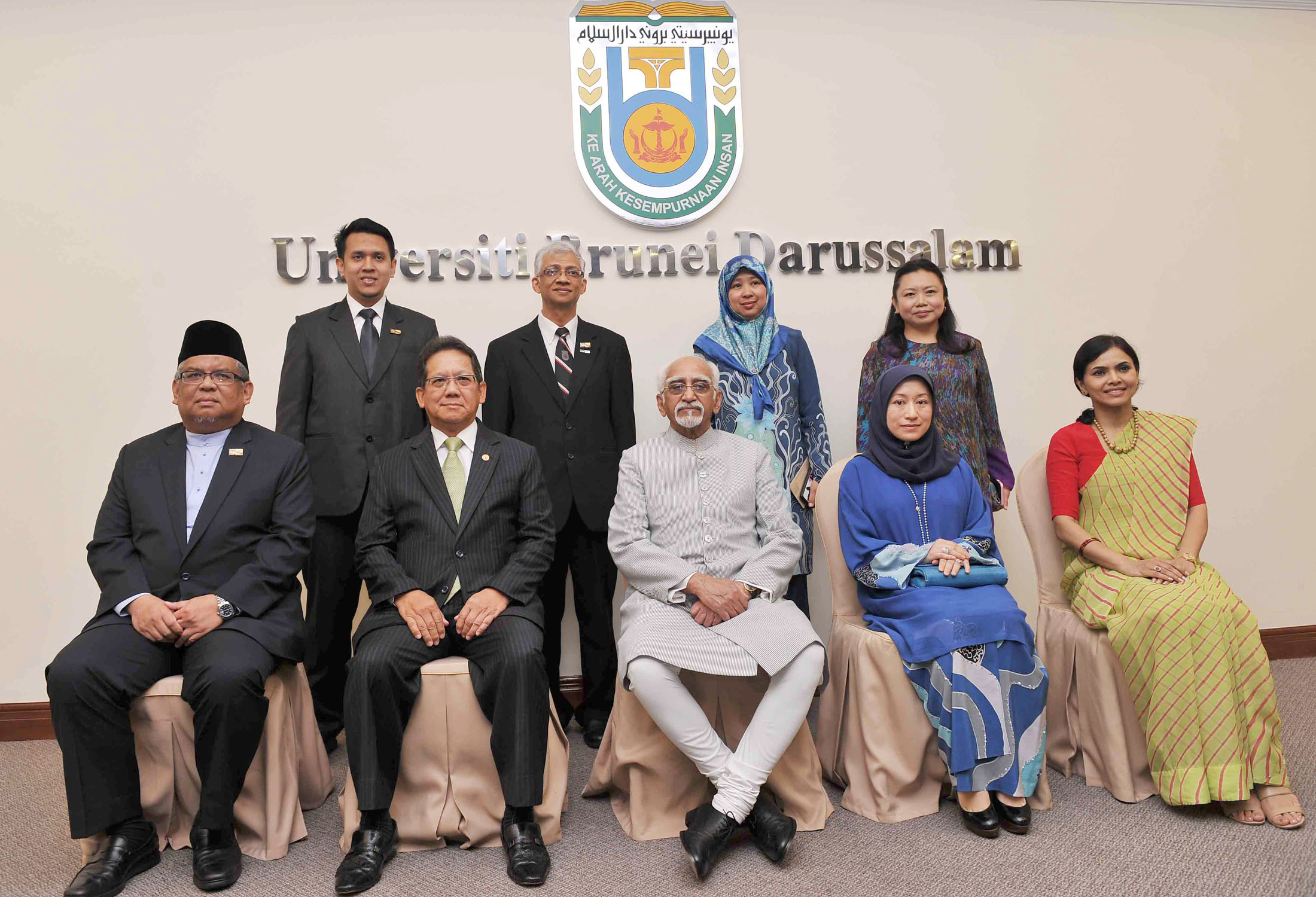
Suyoi (seated, second from right) joined M. Hamid Ansari (seated, centre) during a visit to UBD in 2016

On 18 January 2016, Suyoi raised the Primary School Assessment target to 79% and set a new goal for secondary schools, aiming for 60% of students to achieve five O-Level credits by 2017. Later, on 23 January, he highlighted MoE's efforts to improve education standards and equip students with relevant skills, stressing cooperation with LegCo and emphasising initiatives like the transformation of technical education and scholarship programmes. On 12 March, he clarified that several textbooks from SPN21 are no longer in use and that there are no plans for Melayu Islam Beraja (MIB) O-Level or A-Level exams, while a task force has been set up to ensure MIB is effectively implemented. On 14 March, he announced changes to school meals, replacing cooked food with fruits, bread, biscuits, and juices, and emphasised the need for ongoing monitoring to reduce waste. On 16 March, he revealed plans to track scholarship students' employability and urged universities to align courses with industry needs.

On 24 October 2017, Suyoi unveiled the ministry's redesigned portal, emphasising its role as a 24/7 resource for education updates, teaching materials, and feedback. He underscored its importance in maximising investments, promoting collaboration, and enhancing education through user contributions. On 5 November, he led Brunei's delegation to the 39th UNESCO General Conference in Paris, where he showcased the nation's commitment to quality education through initiatives like the 'Brunei Teacher Standards', SPN21, and the pivotal role of school leaders in delivering high-quality teaching. On 29 January 2018, Suyoi's tenure as minister concluded following a broader cabinet reshuffle, with several senior officials being reassigned, and he was succeeded by Hamzah Sulaiman.

== Legislative Councillor ==
=== 19th LegCo session ===
y command of the sultan, Suyoi was appointed to the LegCo of Brunei on 20 January 2023, under the "titled persons" category. During the 19th LegCo session on 7 March, she highlighted the potential of foreign direct investment to boost national income, create jobs for the local workforce, and stressed the importance of identifying job categories and required skills to prepare locals. On 20 March, she raised concerns about the impact of reduced government construction projects on the industry, prompting Amin Liew Abdullah to emphasise balancing demand and supply, attracting foreign investments, and diversifying industries, while Juanda Abdul Rashid noted a 1.2% rise in construction permits from 2016 to 2022. In November, Suyoi led a delegation to the 31st Asia Pacific Parliamentary Forum in the Philippines, where she showcased Brunei's efforts to combat transnational crimes and foster international security collaboration.

=== 20th LegCo session ===
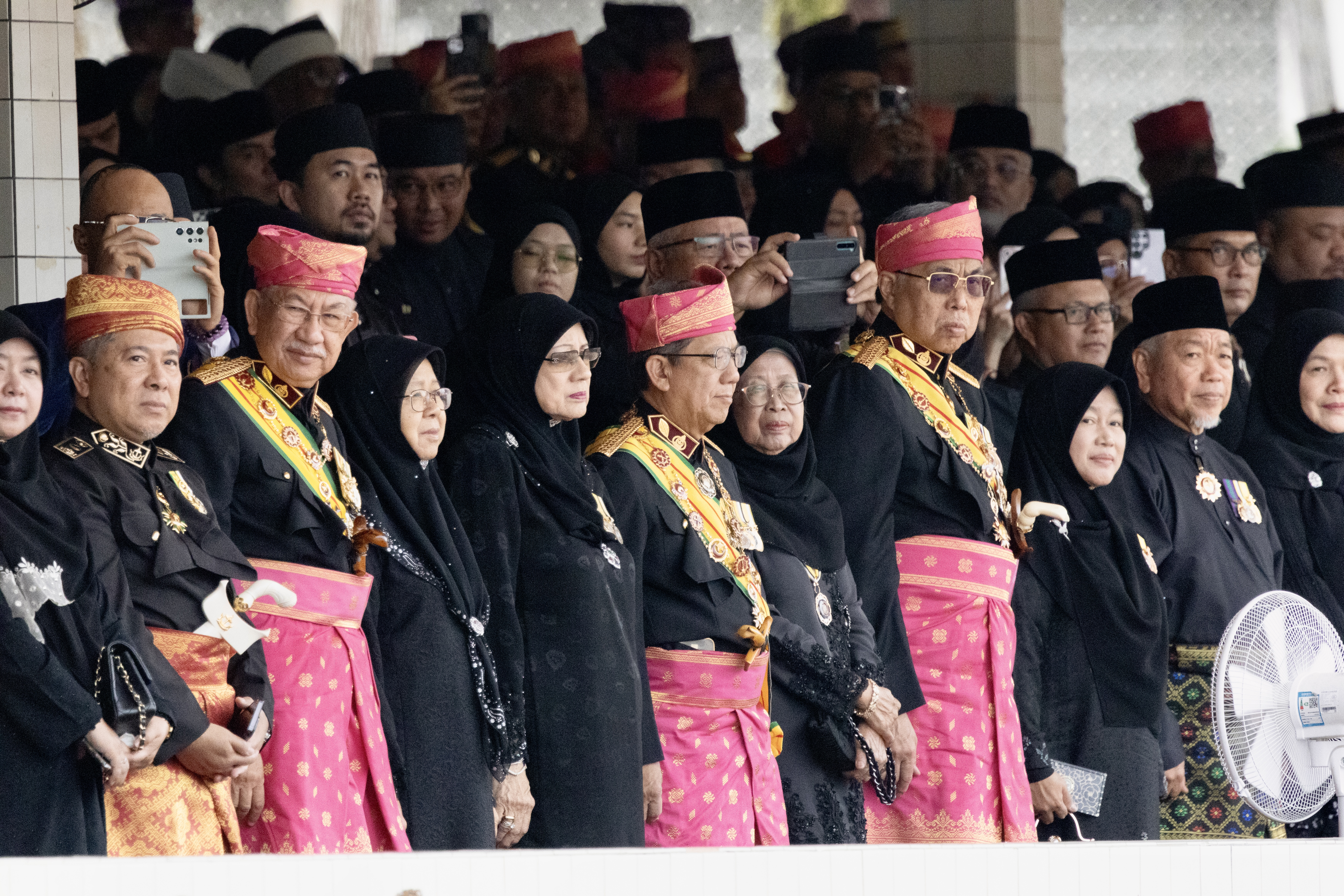
In court uniform, from left to right: Norarfan Zainal, Abdul Rahman Ibrahim, Suyoi and Adanan Yusof in the 2024 sultan's birthday celebration

At the 20th LegCo session on 4 March 2024, Suyoi urged penghulus and ketua kampungs to promptly address community issues, including maintenance, housing, and emergency aid for low-income families. Ahmaddin Abdul Rahman recognised their role as first responders, often using personal funds to assist, while Nazmi Mohamad highlighted continued support from relevant ministries and the Department of Community Development. Suyoi also suggested demolishing abandoned, dangerous government buildings to improve urban areas. Juanda Abdul Rashid reported that 639 vacant buildings had been demolished, and 213 are under evaluation for demolition or rehabilitation.

Suyoi raised concerns about abandoned, deteriorating government buildings, suggesting their demolition to improve urban areas. Juanda reported that of the 5,639 government buildings, 1,000 are unoccupied, with 639 demolished and 213 under evaluation for demolition or rehabilitation, including abandoned commercial buildings removed in 2023. On 7 March 2024, he called for more relief homes and a review of zakat aid distribution. Later on 13 March, he emphasised the need for schools meeting only the minimum standard to improve in areas such as leadership, curriculum, pedagogy, facilities, and community engagement.

== Personal life ==
Suyoi has a son, Mohd Aizul Hakim, who is a diplomat, and a daughter, Amalinda, who is a surgeon. The family resides in Jalan Muara, Kampong Sungai Tilong.

== Titles, styles and honours ==
=== Titles and styles ===
On 17 April 2004, Suyoi was honoured by Sultan Hassanal Bolkiah with the manteri title of Pehin Orang Kaya Indera Pahlawan, bearing the style Yang Dimuliakan.

=== Honours ===
Suyoi has been bestowed the following honours:

- Order of Setia Negara Brunei First Class (PSNB; 15 July 2006) – Dato Seri Setia
- Order of Setia Negara Brunei Fourth Class (PSB; 15 July 1990)
- Order of Seri Paduka Mahkota Brunei Second Class (DPMB) – Dato Paduka
- Meritorious Service Medal (PJK)
- Excellent Service Medal (PIKB)
- Long Service Medal (PKL)
- Proclamation of Independence Medal (10 March 1997)
- Sultan of Brunei Silver Jubilee Medal (5 October 1992)
- National Day Silver Jubilee Medal (23 February 2009)

Political offices
Preceded by Abu Bakar Apong	4th Minister of Education; 22 October 2015 – 29 January 2018	Succeeded by Hamzah Sulaiman
Preceded by Abdullah Bakar	4th Minister of Development; 29 May 2010 – 22 October 2015	Succeeded by Bahrin Abdullah
Preceded by Abu Bakar Apong	4th Minister of Health; 24 May 2005 – 28 May 2010	Succeeded by Adanan Yusof
Preceded by Ahmad Jumat	2nd Deputy Minister of Education; 4 May 2002 – 24 May 2005	Succeeded by Pengiran Mohammad
Diplomatic posts
Preceded by Pengiran Mustapha	Brunei Ambassador to France; 7 October 1991 – 10 July 1996	Succeeded by Pengiran Idris
