= Internal Security Department =

Internal Security Department may refer to:

- Internal Security Department (Brunei)
- Internal Security Department (Singapore)
