= 2018 Bruneian cabinet reshuffle =

Brunei cabinet reshuffle undertaken by Hassanal Bolkiah

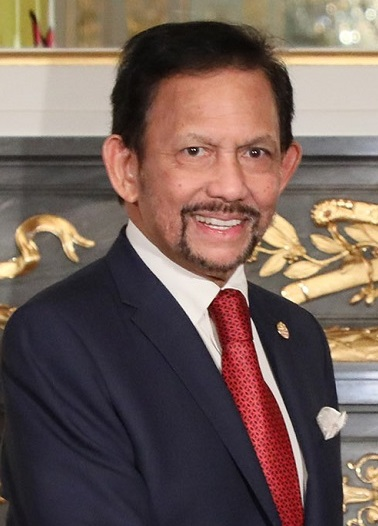
Hassanal Bolkiah

Hassanal Bolkiah carried out the sixth reshuffle of his government on 30 January 2018, replacing some of the nation's longest-serving ministers. The announcement was delivered during a televised speech at 2:30 pm. While the previous cabinet had been reshuffled in 2015 for a five-year term, the sultan unexpectedly introduced this significant change at the start of 2018.

The reshuffle saw six ministers replaced, two women appointed as deputy ministers, and several other promotions introduced. Among those replaced were Yasmin Umar, the minister of energy and industry, and Lim Jock Seng, the minister at the Prime Minister's Office (PMO) and minister of foreign affairs and trade II. In the PMO and Ministry of Education, two female deputy ministers took office, marking a notable step forward. Meanwhile, the sultan retained control of the key portfolios of foreign affairs, finance, defence, and the prime ministership. Crown Prince Al-Muhtadee Billah continued his role as senior minister in the PMO, while Isa Ibrahim, a trusted confidante of the sultan, returned to the cabinet as a PMO minister.

The government provided no clear explanation for the reshuffle, (Note: In his televised speech, Hassanal Bolkiah emphasised the importance of appointees conducting themselves with honour, loyalty, and fairness. He urged cabinet members to give due consideration to petitions, grievances, and constructive suggestions from their subordinates.) which came after the abrupt dismissal of Zulkarnain Hanafi as health minister on 1 December 2014. Addressing the nation, the sultan emphasised that the reshuffle aimed to bring fresh perspectives to senior leadership and accelerate the country's development, particularly in achieving the goals of Wawasan Brunei 2035. He also reaffirmed his commitment to combating corruption, a priority that gained prominence after Brunei dropped three places in Transparency International's global rankings, from 38 in 2013 to 41 in 2016. Notably, the nation improved its position to 32 in 2017.

On 1 February, the new government was sworn in at the palace to commence their national duties for the designated term. The sultan attended the ceremony at his palace, where the grand chamberlain, Pengiran Alauddin, read the letters of appointment. A week after the reshuffle, on 7 February, a Special Cabinet Ministers Meeting was held at the palace.

This was the last major cabinet reshuffle before the COVID-19 pandemic in Brunei, and was followed by one more reshuffle in 2022.

== Cabinet-level changes ==
Colour key
- Joined the Cabinet
- Left the Cabinet

Minister	Position before reshuffle	Result of reshuffle
Abdul Mutalib	Permanent Secretary at the Ministry of Home Affairs	Became Minister of Communications
Amin Liew Abdullah	Deputy Minister of Finance	Became Minister of Finance II
Bahrin Abdullah	Minister of Development	Left the government
Aminuddin Ihsan	High Commissioner of Brunei to the United Kingdom	Became Minister of Culture, Youth and Sports
Abdul Mokti Daud	Deputy Minister of Religious Affairs	Became Minister at the Prime Minister's Office
Suhaimi Gafar	Deputy Minister of Development	Became Minister of Development
Abdul Rahman Ibrahim	Minister of Finance II	Left the government
Isa Ibrahim	None	Became Minister at the Prime Minister's Office
Lim Jock Seng	Minister of Foreign Affairs and Trade II; Minister at the Prime Minister's Office	Left the government
Mat Suny	None	Became Minister of Energy and Industry
Halbi Mohammad Yussof	Minister of Culture, Youth and Sports	Became Minister of Defence II
Suyoi Osman	Minister of Education	Left the government
Mustappa Sirat	Minister of Communications	Left the government
Hamzah Sulaiman	Permanent Secretary (International, Economic, Finance, Research and Development) at the Prime Minister's Office	Became Minister of Education
Yasmin Umar	Minister of Energy and Industry	Left the government
Erywan Yusof	Deputy Minister of Foreign Affairs and Trade	Became Minister of Foreign Affairs and Trade II

== Junior ministerial changes ==
Colour key
- Joined the Cabinet
- Left the Cabinet

Minister	Position before reshuffle	Result of reshuffle
Ahmaddin Abdul Rahman	Permanent Secretary at the Ministry of Finance	Became Deputy Minister of Finance
Hamdan Abu Bakar	Deputy Minister (Media and Security) at the Prime Minister's Office	Left the government
Elinda C.A. Mohammad	Permanent Secretary (Law and Welfare) at the Prime Minister's Office; Director of the Anti-Corruption Bureau (Note: Non-ministerial position)	Became Deputy Minister at the Prime Minister's Office
Roselan Daud	Deputy Minister (Corporate, PENGGERAK and Economy) at the Prime Minister's Office	Left the government
Jamain Julaihi	Deputy Minister (Energy and Industry) at the Prime Minister's Office	Left the government
Hisham Hanifah	Deputy Minister of Finance	Left the government
Abdul Aziz Mohd Tamit	Deputy Minister of Defence	Left the government
Pengiran Bahrom	Deputy Minister of Education	Became Deputy Minister of Religious Affairs
Romaizah Salleh	Permanent Secretary at the Ministry of Education	Became Deputy Minister of Education
Matsatejo Sokiaw	Managing Director of PetroleumBRUNEI (Note: Non-ministerial position)	Became Deputy Minister of Energy and Industry

== Later changes ==
Between the 2018 and 2022 cabinet reshuffles, several minor changes were introduced. The first occurred on 18 April 2018, when the Department of Energy and Industry was elevated to ministerial level and renamed the Ministry of Energy and Industry. Later, on 31 July 2018, it was restructured and renamed the Ministry of Energy (Energy and Manpower) and Industry, also referred to as the Ministry of Energy, Manpower and Industry. On 10 August 2018, Marzuke Mohsin was appointed deputy minister of development.

On 20 September 2018, the Brunei government announced significant reforms, including renaming two ministries: the Ministry of Finance became the Ministry of Finance and Economy (MoFE), and the Ministry of Foreign Affairs and Trade was renamed the Ministry of Foreign Affairs. Abdul Manaf Metussin was promoted to deputy minister of finance, alongside several new appointments for permanent and deputy permanent secretaries, senior special duty officers, and ambassadors. These changes, approved by the sultan, were broadcast on national television. The oath-taking ceremony for both Marzuke and Abdul Manaf was held on 2 October 2018. Lastly for the year, the Ministry of Communications was renamed to the Ministry of Transport and Infocommunications on 15 December 2018.

Under the direction of the sultan, the Ministry of Energy, Manpower and Industry was reorganised and renamed the Ministry of Energy on 18 November 2019 to focus exclusively on energy-related matters. As part of this restructuring, the Manpower Council within PMO was replaced by the Manpower and Employment Council, and the industry portfolio was transferred to the Ministry of Finance and Economy (MoFE). Additionally, the Deputy Permanent Secretary (Corporate and Industry) was reassigned to the Ministry of Primary Resources and Tourism, while Pengiran Haji Mohd Hasnan was transferred to the Ministry of Culture, Youth and Sports. These changes came into effect on 19 November 2019.

Elinda C.A. Mohammad's tenure as director of the Anti-Corruption Bureau and deputy minister in the PMO ended prematurely on 18 January 2020. One of the final changes since the 2018 reshuffle occurred on 20 May 2022, when the Ministry of Energy was restructured into the Department of Energy under the PMO. Mat Suny stepped down, and Deputy Minister Matsatejo Sokiaw assumed leadership of the energy portfolio. As in previous instances, no explanation for the restructuring was provided in the official announcement.

Colour key
- Joined the Cabinet
- Left the Cabinet
- Portfolio renamed

Minister	Position before reshuffle	Result of reshuffle	Effective from
Mat Suny	Minister of Energy and Industry	Became Minister of Energy, Manpower and Industry	31 July 2018
Matsatejo Sokiaw	Deputy Minister of Energy and Industry	Became Deputy Minister of Energy, Manpower and Industry	31 July 2018
Marzuke Mohsin	Permanent Secretary (Technical and Professional) at the Ministry of Development	Became Deputy Minister of Development	10 August 2018
Abdul Manaf Metussin	Permanent Secretary at the Ministry of Primary Resources and Tourism	Became Deputy Minister of Finance and Economy	20 September 2018
Amin Liew Abdullah	Minister of Finance II	Became Minister of Finance and Economy II	20 September 2018
Erywan Yusof	Minister of Foreign Affairs and Trade II	Became Minister of Foreign Affairs II	20 September 2018
Abdul Mutalib	Minister of Communications	Became Minister of Transport and Infocommunications	15 December 2018
Mat Suny	Minister of Energy, Manpower and Industry	Became Minister of Energy	18 November 2019
Matsatejo Sokiaw	Deputy Minister of Energy, Manpower and Industry	Became Deputy Minister of Energy	18 November 2019
Elinda C.A. Mohammad	Deputy Minister at the Prime Minister's Office	Left the government	18 January 2020
Mat Suny	Minister of Energy	Left the government	20 May 2022
Matsatejo Sokiaw	Deputy Minister of Energy	Became Deputy Minister of the Department of Energy at the Prime Minister's Office	20 May 2022
