= Roselan Daud =

Bruneian politician and civil servant (born 1961)

Dato Seri Paduka Roselan Daud SPMB SNB PIKB PKL
- روسلن داود
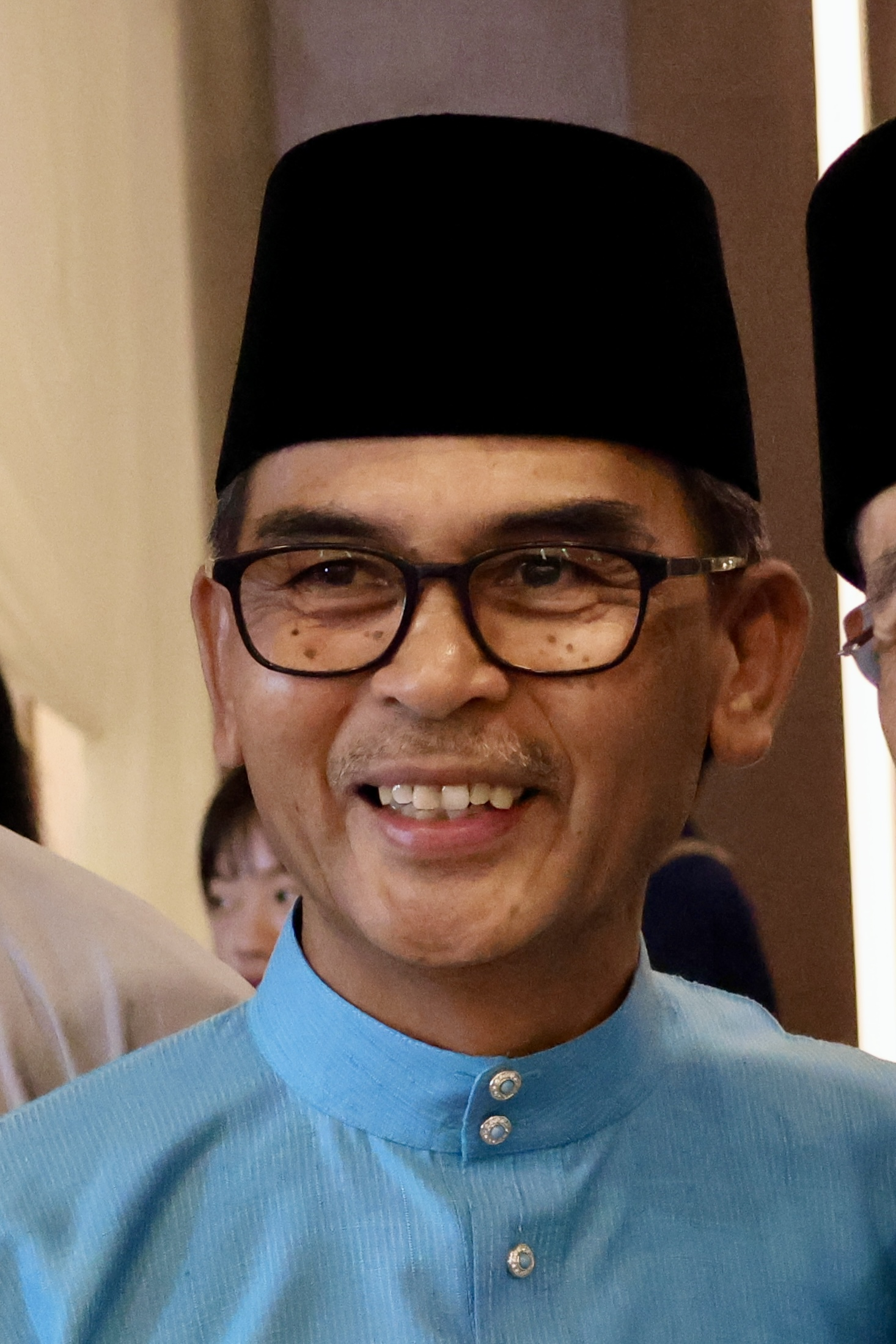
- Roselan in 2024

Deputy Minister at the Prime Minister's Office
- In office 22 October 2015 – 27 September 2018 Serving with Hamdan Abu Bakar
- Monarch: Hassanal Bolkiah
- Preceded by: Abdul Wahab Juned; Ali Apong
- Succeeded by: Elinda C.A. Mohammad

Personal details
- Born: 25 August 1961 (age 65) Brunei
- Spouse: Asmah Murni
- Education: University of Birmingham (BSc); University of Exeter Business School (MBA)
- Profession: Politician; civil servant

Mohamad Roselan bin Mohamad Daud (born 25 August 1961) is a politician and civil servant from Brunei who served as the country's Deputy Minister at the Prime Minister's Office (PMO) from 2015 to 2018.

== Early life and education ==
Mohd Roselan bin Mohd Daud, born on 25 August 1961, is originally from Brunei. He graduated with honours from the University of Exeter School of Business and Economics with a Master of Business Administration in Banking Management and a degree in Public Policymaking and Administration from the University of Birmingham. In Singapore, he finished his pre-university and secondary studies.

== Early career ==
Roselan began his career with the Brunei Administrative Service (BAS) in 1985 at the Ministry of Finance (MoF). In 1994, he was seconded to Tabung Amanah Islam Brunei (TAIB) as Deputy Chief Executive Officer and later became Managing Director of the Islamic Bank of Brunei (IBB) and Takaful IBB in 2002. He rejoined the MoF in 2006 as acting director of Financial Institutions and later as acting director of Research and International. In 2008, he briefly served as an Advisor to the executive director at the International Monetary Fund in Washington, D.C., before being appointed as Deputy Permanent Secretary (Policy & Administration) at the MoF.

Roselan served as a member of the APEC Business Advisory Council (ABAC) for Brunei Darussalam from 2003 to 2006. In October 2009, he was appointed as Permanent Secretary at the MoF and was later transferred to the PMO in the same role in October 2011. He currently serves as chairman of the board of directors for the Center for Strategic and Policy Studies (CSPS) and as a member of the Brunei Economic Development Board (BEDB), both appointments effective from November 2011.

On 23 August 2010, Roselan, with the consent of the Sultan of Brunei, issued the Additional Contributory Pension (Non-Employee) Order, 2010, declaring specific government officials, armed forces members, police officers, and prison officers in pensionable positions as non-employees for pension purposes. Later on 1 August 2011, he signed the Protocol to Implement the Fifth Package of Commitments on Financial Services under the ASEAN Framework Agreement on Services, confirming Brunei's completion of internal procedures for the protocol's entry into force. In June 2012, he stressed the importance of a sustainable National Land Transportation Master Plan in supporting Wawasan Brunei 2035, addressing challenges like traffic congestion, public transport limitations, and the need for better regional connectivity.

== Ministerial career ==
During the 2015 cabinet reshuffle on 22 October, Roselan was appointed the deputy minister at the PMO.

In April 2016, Roselan visited Singapore under the Ministry of Foreign Affairs' Distinguished Visitors Programme, engaging with Singaporean leaders and officials. On 15 September, Roselan underlined that the Bruneian government is dedicated to creating an environment that is favorable for investors and SMEs by streamlining procedures, expanding resource accessibility, and raising the ranking of ease of doing business.

In March 2017, Roselan highlighted that, despite 92.8% of Brunei's civil service staff receiving high performance grades for 2016, there is still room for improvement. He emphasised the need for a new Performance Management System, to be implemented in October, which aims to enhance the performance culture and efficiency within the Civil Service through better training and effective implementation. On 13 May, he underlined the significance of the Brunei–Malaysia Public Service Officer Exchange Program, emphasising its role in fostering closer personal relationships and supporting Wawasan Brunei 2035's goal of improving service quality. The program is a valuable platform for enhancing bilateral relations and improving public service performance.

He was replaced as deputy minister by Elinda C.A. Mohammad in a cabinet reshuffle ordered by Sultan Hassanal Bolkiah on 27 September 2018.

== Personal life ==
Roselan is married to Asmah binti Murni and has one daughter and two sons. In his leisure time, he enjoys playing football, badminton and golf.

== Honours ==
Roselan has earned the following honours;

- Order of Seri Paduka Mahkota Brunei First Class (SPMB; 15 July 2017) – Dato Seri Paduka
- Order of Seri Paduka Mahkota Brunei Second Class (DPMB; 15 July 2011) – Dato Paduka
- Order of Seri Paduka Mahkota Brunei Third Class (SMB; 2002)
- Order of Setia Negara Brunei Third Class (SNB; 2010)
- Order of Setia Negara Brunei Fourth Class (PSB; 1997)
- Excellent Service Medal (PIKB; 2001)
- Long Service Medal (PKL; 2009)

Political offices
| Preceded by Abdul Wahab Juned; Ali Apong | Deputy Minister at the Prime Minister's Office; 22 October 2015 – 27 September 2018 | Succeeded by Elinda C.A. Mohammad |
