= Yakub Abu Bakar =

Bruneian politician (1947–2007)

Dato Paduka Yakub Abu Bakar DPMB PSB PJK PIKB
- ياقوب ابو بكر
- Yakub in 2005

2nd Deputy Minister of Culture, Youth and Sports
- In office 20 September 2004 – 20 January 2007
- Monarch: Hassanal Bolkiah
- Minister: Mohammad Daud
- Preceded by: Selamat Munap
- Succeeded by: Adina Othman

Deputy Minister of Finance
- In office March 2003 – 20 September 2004
- Minister: Hassanal Bolkiah
- Preceded by: Ahmad Wally Skinner
- Succeeded by: Abdul Rahman Ibrahim

Personal details
- Born: 31 August 1947 Brunei
- Died: 20 January 2007 (aged 59) Singapore
- Resting place: Damuan Cemetery
- Spouse: Suzanah Rahmah
- Education: Harvard University
- Occupation: Civil servant; politician

Yakub bin Abu Bakar (31 August 1947 – 20 January 2007) was a politician from Brunei who served as the deputy minister of culture, youth and sports between 2005 and 2007, and deputy minister of finance from 2003 to 2004. He was also among the board of directors of Yayasan Sultan Haji Hassanal Bolkiah from 1992 to 1995.

== Early life and education ==
Yakub received his education at Harvard University and began working for the government in 1973 as an administrative officer, first for the Brunei Economic Development Board and later for the department of education. In September 1980, he was appointed postmaster-general. He further expanded his experience and served in the young Brunei diplomatic service in London before being promoted to permanent secretary at the ministry of finance between 1 September 1989 and 19 October 2001. He attended the 5th Meeting of the ASEAN Directors-General of Customs in Brunei from 22 to 23 May 1997.

== Ministerial career ==
For the following three years, Yakub served as deputy minister of finance. He held a number of additional positions, such as acting chairman of the Brunei Investment Agency (BIA) from 28 November 2001 to 8 February 2003. Additionally, he held the position of chairman of Brunei Shell Tankers for a while. He occasionally served as the acting minister of finance, with allusions to the dates of 5 January 2002, 12 June 2002, 18 June 2002, and 19 October 2003, with the Sultan of Brunei serving in that capacity from 1984 to 1986 and again from 1997 onward. He had also taken part in significant international gatherings throughout his career, such as the 7th APEC Finance Ministers Meeting in Brunei in September 2000, where he served as the organisation's chairman for finance and central bankers. On 20 September 2004, he was transferred to the role of minister of culture, youth and sports, a post he would hold until his death in 2007.

== Death ==
At the young age of fifty-nine, Yakub died in Singapore. His body was flown and delivered to the family's home in Kampong Jerudong around 11:35 a.m. On 21 January 2007, Sultan Hassanal Bolkiah gave his permission to visit and offer his condolences to his family at their home in Kampong Jerudong. Prince Abdul Mateen, Princess Masna, Princess Nor'ain, Princess Amal Umi Kalthum Al-Islam, and Princess Amal Nasibah were also in attendance. Abdul Aziz Juned led the gathering in Jenazah prayers. Incumbent and retired ministers, deputy ministers, permanent secretaries, other top government officials, as well as Yakub's family members, were present at the family's home. Once prayers were completed, he was buried at the Damuan Cemetery in Bandar Seri Begawan.

== Personal life ==
Yakub was born on 31 August 1947. He has four biological children with Datin Hajah Suzanah Rahmah binti Haji Abd Aziz, as well as four more through adoption.

== Honours ==
Throughout his career, Yakub has earned the following honours:

- Order of Seri Paduka Mahkota Brunei Second Class (DPMB) – Dato Paduka
- Order of Setia Negara Brunei Fourth Class (PSB)
- Excellent Service Medal (PIKB)
- Meritorious Service Medal (PJK)

Political offices
Preceded by Selamat Munap	2nd Deputy Minister of Culture, Youth and Sports; 20 September 2004 – 20 January 2007	Succeeded by Adina Othman
Preceded by Ahmad Wally Skinner	Deputy Minister of Finance; March 2003 – 20 September 2004	Succeeded by Abdul Rahman Ibrahim
