= Ahmad Wally Skinner =

Bruneian politician

Yang Dimuliakan Pehin Orang Kaya Setia Wangsa Dato Paduka Seri Laila Jasa Ahmad Wally Skinner PSLJ DPMB POAS PJK PKL
- أحمد ولي سكينر
- Official portrait

Deputy Minister of Finance
- In office 21 October 1986 – March 2003
- Monarch: Hassanal Bolkiah
- Minister: Prince Jefri Bolkiah; Hassanal Bolkiah
- Preceded by: Prince Jefri Bolkiah
- Succeeded by: Yakub Abu Bakar

Chairman of Royal Brunei Airlines
- In office 16 September 1992 – 7 September 1998
- Succeeded by: Alimin Abdul Wahab

Personal details
- Born: Wallace Skinner; February 14, 1924 Kudat, North Borneo, British Empire (now present-day Sabah, Malaysia)
- Died: May 16, 2014 (aged 90) Kampung Manggis Dua, Berakas, Bandar Seri Begawan, Brunei
- Resting place: Kampong Pulaie Muslim Cemetery, Bandar Seri Begawan, Brunei
- Occupation: Civil servant; politician

Ahmad Wally Skinner (14 February 1924 – 16 May 2014) was a Bruneian aristocrat and politician of British descent who formerly served as the Deputy Minister of Finance from 1986 to 2003. Additionally, he was the chairman of the board of directors of Royal Brunei Airlines (RBA) from 16 September 1992 to 8 September 1998.

== Career ==
Ahmad Wally Skinner started working for the government of Brunei in 1949 as a B-level clerk. From 1974 until his retirement on 14 February 1979, he held a number of positions in the government, including those of senior accountant, commissioner of cooperation development, and accountant. He was rehired on a contract basis from 1979 to 1982 as an accountant at the Brunei Government's office in London. Prior to being promoted to Permanent Secretary at the Ministry of Finance in 1984, he was designated as the Acting State Finance Officer upon his return to Brunei in 1983. Later, from 1986 till his retirement in March 2003, he held the position of Deputy Minister of Finance. RBA's chairman was Dato Mohammad Alimin since 21 September 1998, replacing acting chairman Pehin Dato Ahmad Wally Skinner. Following Shane Stone's resignation as Chief Minister of Australia's Northern Territory, Ahmad Wally Skinner issued a letter corresponding to it.

On 28 February 1998, Ahmad Wally Skinner attended the ASEAN Finance Ministers Meeting in Jakarta, Indonesia, where among other things, the financial condition in the area was discussed. The Second ASEAN Senior Finance Officials Meeting, held on 27 February 1998 in Jakarta, came before the meeting. A year before, he also attended the meeting of the ASEAN Finance Ministers, which took place in Kuala Lumpur on 2 December 1997 and was attended by the Finance Ministers of Australia, China, Hong Kong, Japan, Korea, and the United States.

The Ministry of Finance was implementing the second phase of the Treasury and Financial Information System (TAFIS) project. During the 2001 Ministry's Raya festivities at the International Convention Center, Ahmad Wally Skinner made this revelation. The finance ministry is putting TAFIS into place, he added, to raise the administrative bar for a more creative, successful, effective, and efficient public service. According to him, the initiative will allow the government to provide clients in the public and private sectors with excellent financial services.

== Death ==
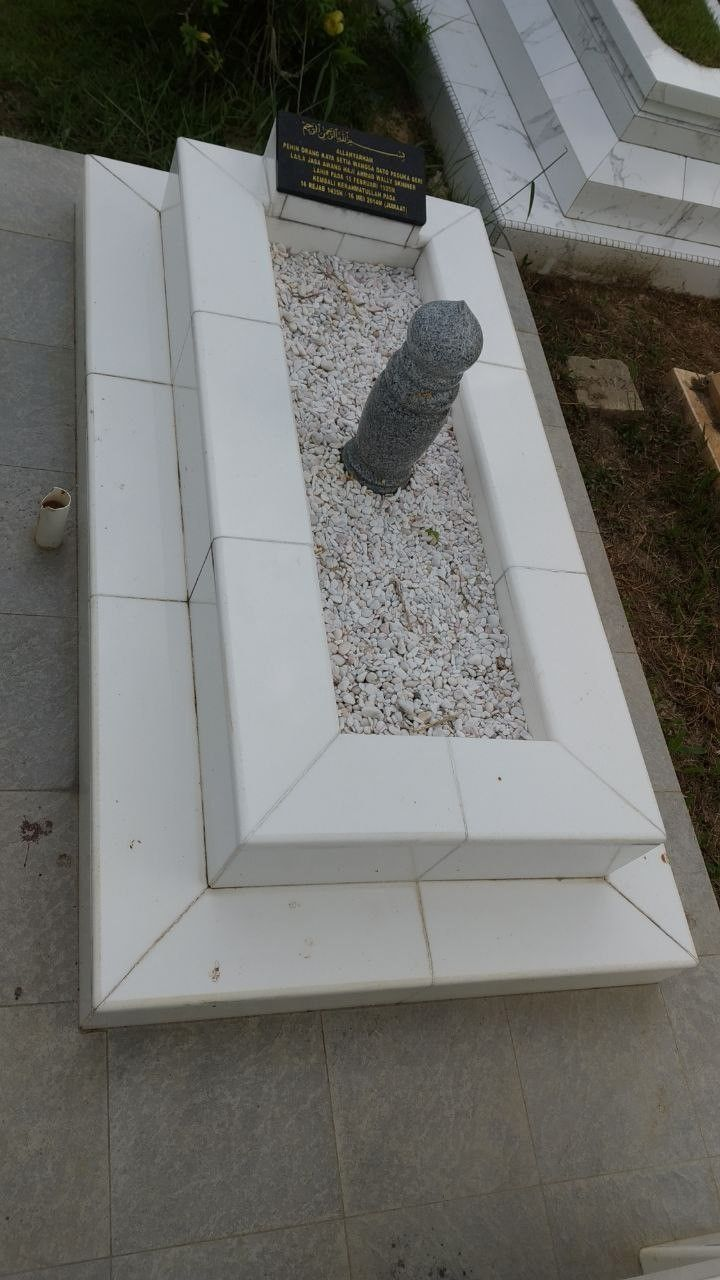
Grave of Pehin Ahmad Wally Skinner at Pulaie Muslim Cemetery, Kampong Pulaie

Pehin Dato Ahmad Wally Skinner, who died at the age of 90 in the wee hours of 16 May 2014, in which the Sultan, Hassanal Bolkiah and Prince Al-Muhtadee Billah paid their last respects, during Jenazah prayers at his residence in Kampong Manggis, Jalan Muara, Berakas 'B'. At Kampong Pulaie Muslim Cemetery, he was buried.

== Personal life ==
On 24 June 1944, Ahmad Wally Skinner married Fatimah Patricia McGeoch, a fellow British expatriate who was also a Muslim convert. Together, they have two children and seven grandchildren. They remain married until her death, for he had outlived her at the time of his demise.

== Titles, styles and honours ==
Ahmad Wally Skinner was bestowed the Manteri title of Pehin Orang Kaya Setia Wangsa on 21 May 1996, styled as Yang Dimuliakan. has earned the following honours;

- Order of Paduka Seri Laila Jasa First Class (PSLJ) – Dato Seri Laila Jasa
- Order of Seri Paduka Mahkota Brunei Second Class (DPMB) – Dato Paduka
- Omar Ali Saifuddin Medal (POAS)
- Meritorious Service Medal (PJK)
- Long Service Medal (PKL)

Political offices
Preceded by Jefri Bolkiah	Deputy Minister of Finance; 21 October 1986 – March 2003	Succeeded by Yakub Abu Bakar
Business positions
Preceded by –	Chairman of Royal Brunei Airlines; 16 September 1992 – 7 September 1998	Succeeded by Alimin Abdul Wahab
