= Embassy of Indonesia, Bandar Seri Begawan =

Embassy of the Republic of Indonesia in Bandar Seri Begawan Kedutaan Besar Republik Indonesia di Bandar Seri Begawan

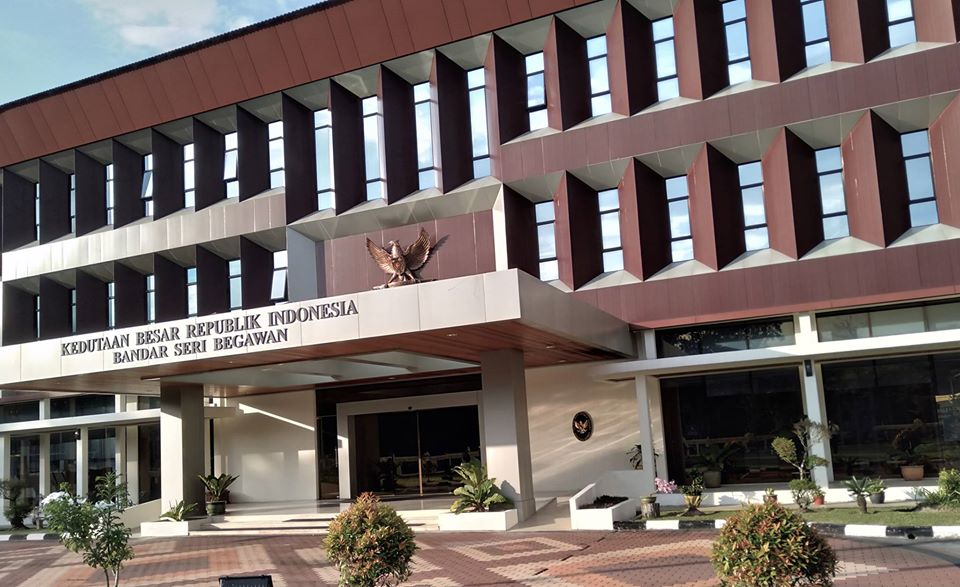
- Location: Bandar Seri Begawan, Brunei
- Address: Simpang 336-43; Jalan Kebangsaan; Kampong Kawasan Diplomatik; Mukim Kianggeh; Bandar Seri Begawan; Brunei
- Coordinates: 4.922513°N 114.958362°E
- Ambassador: Sudjatmiko
- Website: kemlu.go.id/bandarseribegawan/en/

The Embassy of the Republic of Indonesia in Bandar Seri Begawan (Indonesian: Kedutaan Besar Republik Indonesia di Bandar Seri Begawan) is the diplomatic mission of the Republic of Indonesia to Brunei Darussalam. Since 1 July 2014, the chancery has been located at Simpang 336-43, Kebangsaan Street in Kampong Kawasan Diplomatik. Prior to this location, the embassy was located at Simpang 528, Lot 4498, Muara Street in Kampong Sungai Hanching Baru.

Diplomatic relations between Indonesia and Brunei were established on 1 January 1984. The first Indonesian ambassador to Brunei was Zuwir Djamal (1983–1987). He presented his letter of credentials to Sultan Hassanal Bolkiah on 13 February 1984. The current ambassador, Sudjatmiko, was appointed by President Joko Widodo on 20 February 2018.

== Gallery ==
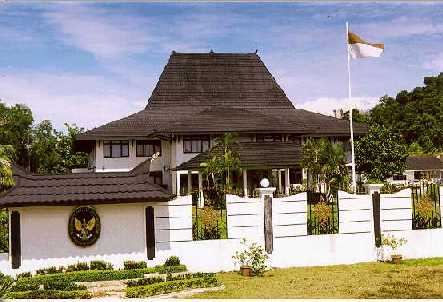
The previous chancery at Simpang 528, Lot 4498, Muara Street

== See also ==
- Brunei–Indonesia relations
- List of diplomatic missions of Indonesia
- List of diplomatic missions in Brunei
