= Internal Security Department (Brunei) =

Domestic intelligence agency of Brunei

- Jabatan Keselamatan Dalam Negeri جابتن كسلامتن دالم نڬري

Agency overview
- Formed: 1 August 1993; 33 years ago
- Preceding agency: Royal Brunei Police Force Special Branch
- Jurisdiction: Government of Brunei
- Headquarters: Jalan Utama Mentiri, Kampong Sungai Tilong, Mukim Berakas 'B', Brunei BC3315
- Parent agency: Prime Minister's Office
- Website: Official website

The Internal Security Department (Malay: Jabatan Keselamatan Dalam Negeri, or JKDN or KDN) is Brunei's domestic intelligence and secret police agency under the Sultan of Brunei at Prime Minister's Office. They are known to detain anyone suspected of being a threat to Brunei's national security for as long as needed.

They are involved in both criminal and intelligence matters.

== History ==
The ISD was created to replace the Royal Brunei Police's Special Branch division, which was disbanded on 1 August 1993.

In 2011, Tobishima Corporation was the contractor responsible for completing the Latifudin Complex Tungku Link in Rimba.

== Roles ==
The ISD is in charge of cases that involve subversion, espionage, sabotage, terrorism and promotion of racial/religious violence. However, the ISD collaborates with the Royal Brunei Police Force to maintain internal security.

== Organization ==
The ISD has its headquarters at Jalan Utama Mentiri with branch offices in Tutong, Belait and Temburong.
