= Prime Minister's Office (Brunei) =

Bruneian government ministry

- Jabatan Perdana Menteri
- National emblem of Brunei

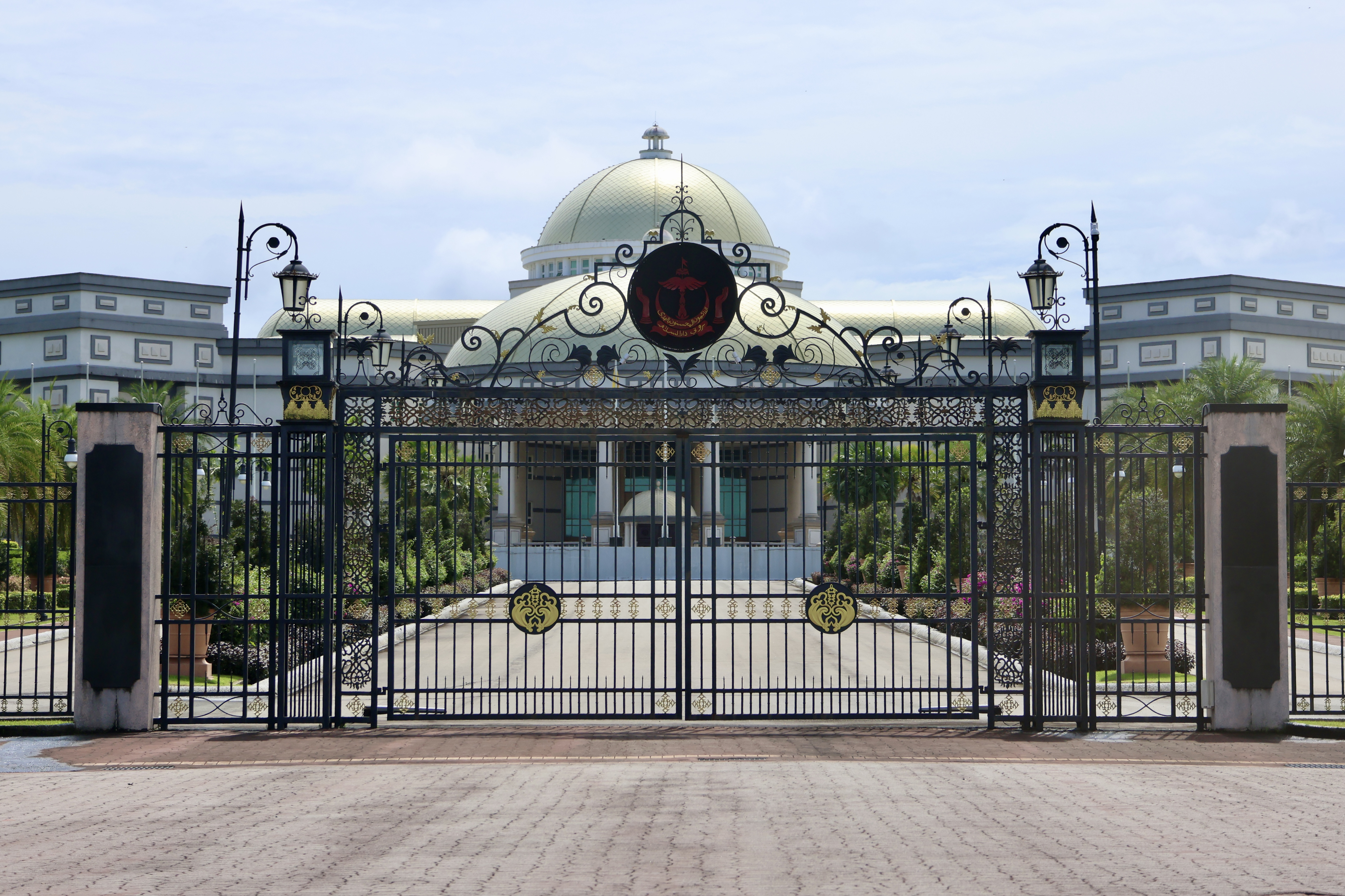
- Prime Minister's Office

Ministry overview
- Formed: 1 January 1984; 42 years ago
- Jurisdiction: Government of Brunei
- Headquarters: Bandar Seri Begawan, Brunei; 4°55′12″N 114°56′17″E
- Employees: 5,767 (2024)
- Annual budget: ▼$385 million BND (2022)
- Ministers responsible: Sultan Hassanal Bolkiah, Prime Minister; Crown Prince Al-Muhtadee Billah, Senior Minister at the Prime Minister's Office; Awang Isa Awang Ibrahim (Note: The official Malay name upon the appointment was Pehin Orang Kaya Laila Setia Bakti Di-Raja Dato Laila Utama Haji Awang Isa bin Pehin Datu Perdana Manteri Dato Laila Utama Haji Awang Ibrahim.), Special Advisor to His Majesty, and Minister at the Prime Minister's Office; Awang Halbi Mohd. Yussof (Note: The official Malay name upon the appointment was Pehin Datu Lailaraja Mejar Jeneral (Bersara) Dato Paduka Seri Haji Awang Halbi bin Haji Mohd. Yussof.), Minister at the Prime Minister's Office; Mohd Amin Liew Abdullah (Note: The official Malay name upon the appointment was Dato Seri Setia Dr. Awang Haji Mohd. Amin Liew bin Abdullah.), Minister at the Prime Minister's Office (also Second Minister of Finance and Economy)
- Deputy Ministers responsible: Azmi Hanifah (Note: The official Malay name upon the appointment was Haji Mohammad Azmi bin Haji Mohd Hanifah.), Deputy Minister of Energy at the Prime Minister's Office; Mohammed Riza Mohammed Yunos (Note: The official Malay name upon the appointment was Awang Mohammed Riza bin Dato Paduka Haji Mohammed Yunos.), Deputy Minister at the Prime Minister’s Office; Sufian Sabtu (Note: The official Malay name upon the appointment was Dato Paduka Awang Haji Sufian bin Haji Sabtu.), Deputy Minister at the Prime Minister’s Office
- Website: www.pmo.gov.bn

The Prime Minister's Office (PMO; Malay: Jabatan Perdana Menteri, JPM) is the leading and largest cabinet-level ministry in the government of Brunei. It serves as the immediate office of the country's prime minister, as well as oversees several key government departments. It was established immediately upon Brunei's independence on 1 January 1984, with Hassanal Bolkiah, the current Sultan of Brunei, being the first and only prime minister to date. The leadership also consists of a Senior Minister (Menteri Kanan), introduced in 2005 and has since been held by the Crown Prince Al-Muhtadee Billah, a Special Advisor (Penasihat Khas) to His Majesty, as well as in-house ministers and deputy ministers.

The ministry is located in Bandar Seri Begawan with two headquarters, one located at Istana Nurul Iman and another at a building at Jalan Perdana Menteri.

== Departments ==
The ministry oversees the largest portfolio in the cabinet with 19 departments. (Note: As of 2021) They include:

- Audit Department — office of the country's auditor general
- Anti-Corruption Bureau (Biro Mencegah Rasuah, BMR) — the country's anti-corruption agency
- Attorney General's Chambers (AGC) — office of the country's attorney general
- Brunei Research Department - Brunei's foreign intelligence service. (Note: Not to be confused with the Brunei Research Council)
- Civil Service Institute (Institut Perkhidmatan Awam, IPA)
- Councils of State Department (Jabatan Majlis-Majlis Mesyuarat) — oversees the Legislative Council, Council of Cabinet Ministers and Privy Council
- Energy Department — oversees the country's energy sector including the petroleum industry. It was formerly a separate ministry from 2018 until 2022.
- Internal Security Department (Jabatan Keselamatan Dalam Negeri, KDN) — responsible for the country's internal security
- Information Department (Jabatan Penerangan) — known for publishing of the government newspaper Pelita Brunei
- Management Services Department (Jabatan Perkhidmatan Pengurusan) — known for overseeing the implementation of Tekad Pemedulian Orang Ramai (TPOR), the customer service charter for government organisations
- Manpower and Employment Council (MPEC) – established in 2020, it is responsible for addressing the country's unemployment issues
- Narcotics Control Bureau (Biro Kawalan Narkotik, BKN) — responsible for combatting the smuggling and spread of narcotics in the country
- Public Service Commission (Suruhanjaya Perkhidmatan Awam, SPA) — a constitutional body responsible for civil service appointments, promotions and discipline
- Public Service Department (Jabatan Perkhidmatan Awam, JPA)
- Radio Television Brunei (RTB) — the country's sole public broadcaster
- State Custom and Traditions Department (Jabatan Adat Istiadat Negara, JAIN) — oversees the state and royal customs and ceremonies
- Royal Brunei Police Force (Pasukan Polis Diraja Brunei) — the country's police
- State Mufti Department (Jabatan Mufti Kerajaan) — office of the state mufti, who has the authority to issue state fatwas
- State Judiciary Department (Jabatan Kehakiman Negara) — oversees the country's civil and sharia courts

== Budget ==
The allocated budget for the fiscal year 2022–23 is about B$385 million (Note: ≈US$276 million as of July 2022), a 10.8 percent decrease from the previous fiscal year.

== Prime Minister's Office building ==
On 7 December 2012, the project was finished, and Jurusy Perunding offered comprehensive structural and civil engineering consulting services. This includes finishing off partially built structures, adding intermediate stories, expanding the building's footprint, carrying out exterior work, and fixing structural flaws.

According to UE E&C, United Engineers (B), a 90% owned subsidiary of the business, has been awarded a B$131.5 million tender to construct the PMO building complex in Bandar Seri Begawan. The follow-up construction project is scheduled to begin in December 2012 and last for 13 months. This project falls under funding for the 10th National Development Plan (RKN 10). The Bruneian government designated Nizam Wahab as the principal architect and consultant for OWMP International in the areas of interior and landscape design.

In time for Brunei's chaired 22nd ASEAN Summit Meeting, the project was finished in 18 months. With two wings around a central dome, the building's architecture is marked by symmetry. The surrounding scenery incorporates water fountains. The architectural plan incorporates conventional design features suitable for a governmental structure, with an emphasis on practical space. The six-story building complex has 92,000 square metres (990,000 sq ft) and house several governmental agencies and departments. Architecturally, the complex's interior areas were accentuated with specially made theatre seats that complemented the overall style of the structure.
