= Government agencies in Brunei =

This is the list of government agencies in Brunei.

== Ministries ==
Brunei, at present, has the following ministries:

- Prime Minister's Office (PMO)
- Ministry of Finance and Economy (MOFE)
- Ministry of Defence (MINDEF)
- Ministry Foreign Affairs (MFA)
- Ministry of Home Affairs (MOHA)
- Ministry of Education (MOE)
- Ministry of Primary Resources and Tourism (MPRT)
- Ministry of Development (MOD)
- Ministry of Culture, Youth and Sports (MCYS)
- Ministry of Health (MOH)
- Ministry of Religious Affairs (MORA)
- Ministry of Transport and Infocommunications (MTIC)

== Agencies ==
=== Prime Minister's Office ===
Prime Minister's Office, having status of a ministry, comprises the following agencies:

- Anti Corruption Bureau (BMR)
- Attorney-General's Chambers (AGC)
- Audit Department
- Civil Service Institute (IPA)
- Councils of State (Note: Privy Council, Council of Cabinet Ministers and Legislative Council are under the jurisdiction of this agency.)
- Department of Economic Planning and Statistics (DEPS)
- Department of Energy
- Government Printing Department
- Information Department
- Internal Security Department (KDN)
- Management Services Department (MSD)
- Narcotics Control Bureau (BKN)
- Public Service Commission (SPA)
- Public Service Department (PSD)
- Royal Brunei Police Force (RBPF)
- Radio Television Brunei (RTB)
- Royal Customs and Traditions Department (JAIN)
- State Judiciary
- State Mufti Department (JMK)

=== Ministry of Finance ===
The Ministry comprises the following agencies:

- Royal Customs and Excise Department
- State Supply and Storage Department
- Treasury Department

=== Ministry of Defence ===
The Ministry comprises the following agencies, but not limited to:

- Royal Brunei Armed Forces (RBAF)
- Sultan Haji Hassanal Bolkiah Institute of Defence and Strategic Studies (SHHBIDSS)

=== Ministry of Foreign Affairs and Trade ===
No agency under this Ministry (Note: Embassies and high commissions are under the jurisdiction of this Ministry.)

=== Ministry of Home Affairs ===
The Ministry comprises the following agencies:

- District offices (Belait, Brunei-Muara, Temburong and Tutong)
- Fire and Rescue Department (FRD)
- Immigration and National Registration Department (JIPK)
- Labour Department
- Municipal boards (Bandar Seri Begawan, Kuala Belait and Seria, and Tutong)
- National Disaster Management Centre (NDMC)
- Prisons Department

=== Ministry of Education ===
No agency under this Ministry (Note: Government education institutions are under the jurisdiction of this Ministry.)

=== Ministry of Primary Resources and Tourism ===
The Ministry comprises the following agencies:

- Agriculture and Agrifood Department
- Department of Fisheries (DOF)
- Forestry Department (JPH)
- Tourism Development Department

=== Ministry of Development ===
The Ministry comprises the following agencies:

- Housing Development Department (HDD)
- Environment, Parks and Recreation Department (JASTRE)
- Land Department
- Public Works Department (JKRB)
- Survey Department
- Town and Country Planning Department (JPBD)

=== Ministry of Culture, Youth and Sports ===
The Ministry comprises the following agencies:

- Community Development Department (JAPEM)
- Brunei History Centre
- Language and Literature Bureau (DBP)
- Museums Department
- National Service Programme (PKBN)
- Youth and Sports Department

=== Ministry of Health ===
No agency under this Ministry (Note: Government health facilities are under the jurisdiction of this Ministry.)

=== Ministry of Religious Affairs ===
The Ministry comprises the following agencies, but not limited to: (Note: Government religious schools are under the jurisdiction of this Ministry.)

- Seri Begawan Religious Teachers University College (KUPU SB)
- Sultan Haji Hassanal Bolkiah Tahfiz al-Quran Institute (ITQSHHB)

=== Ministry of Communications ===
The Ministry comprises the following agencies:

- Department of Civil Aviation (DCA)
- Land Transport Department (JPD)
- Meteorological Department (MET Brunei)
- Postal Services Department

=== Ministry of Energy and Industry ===
The Ministry comprises the following agencies:

- Department of Electrical Services (DES)
- e-Government National Centre (eGNC)
