= Lumut–Belait Highway =

Road in Brunei

Coordinates: 4.5832792°N 114.2968065°E

Lumut–Belait Highway
- Lebuhraya Lumut–Belait (Malay) ليبوهراي لوموت بلايت (Jawi)
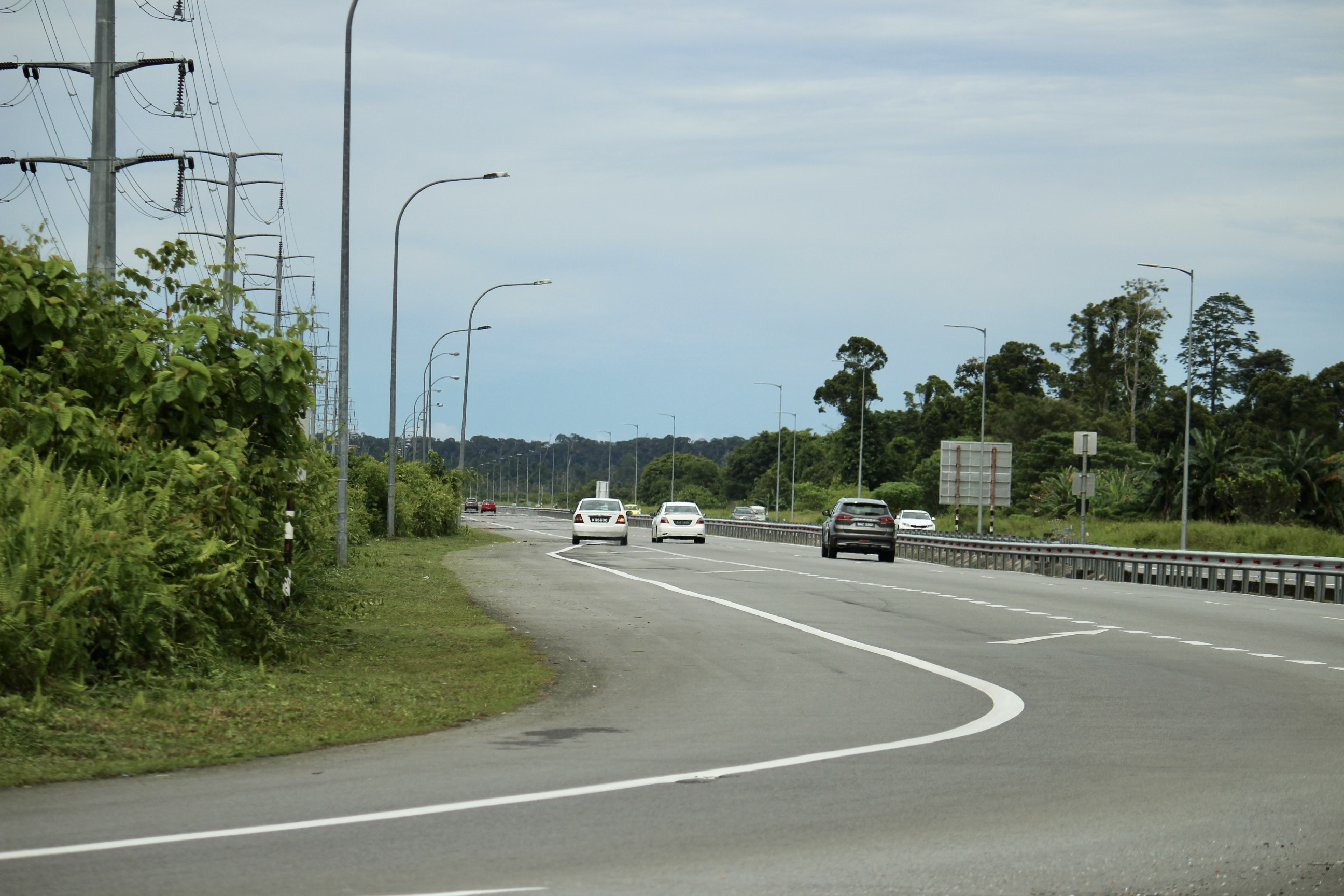

Route information
- Part of AH150
- Maintained by Public Works Department

Major junctions
- West end: Jalan Rasau By-Pass
- Jalan Seri Maharaja, Jalan Maulana, Jalan Lorong 3 Barat, Jalan Malawaring
- East end: Seria By-Pass, Telisai–Lumut Highway

Location
- Country: Brunei
- Districts: Belait
- Towns: Seria, Kuala Belait

Highway system
- Brunei National Roads System

Lumut–Belait Highway (Malay: Lebuhraya Lumut–Belait; Jawi: ليبوهراي لوموت بلايت) is a major highway in Belait District, Brunei. It bypasses the town centers of Seria and Kuala Belait, in addition to the Sungai Belait toll bridge, which is not present along the original route of the Pan Borneo Highway. Along the section of the original route of the Pan Borneo Highway between Kampung Sungai Teraban and Kampung Lumut, motorists may need to cross the Belait River via a river ferry service; therefore, the Belait River bridge at the Kuala Belait Highway enables motorists to cross the river directly without using the river ferry service which may become dangerous during bad weather. The section of the Kuala Belait highway that passes through Seria is generally known as the 'Seria Bypass'. Construction is under way to expand the part of the Kuala Belait Highway from a single carriageway highway to a dual carriageway highway.
