= Suhaimi Gafar =

Bruneian politician and civil engineer

Dato Seri Setia Suhaimi Gafar PSNB SPMB SNB PIKB PKL
- سوهايمي ڬفر
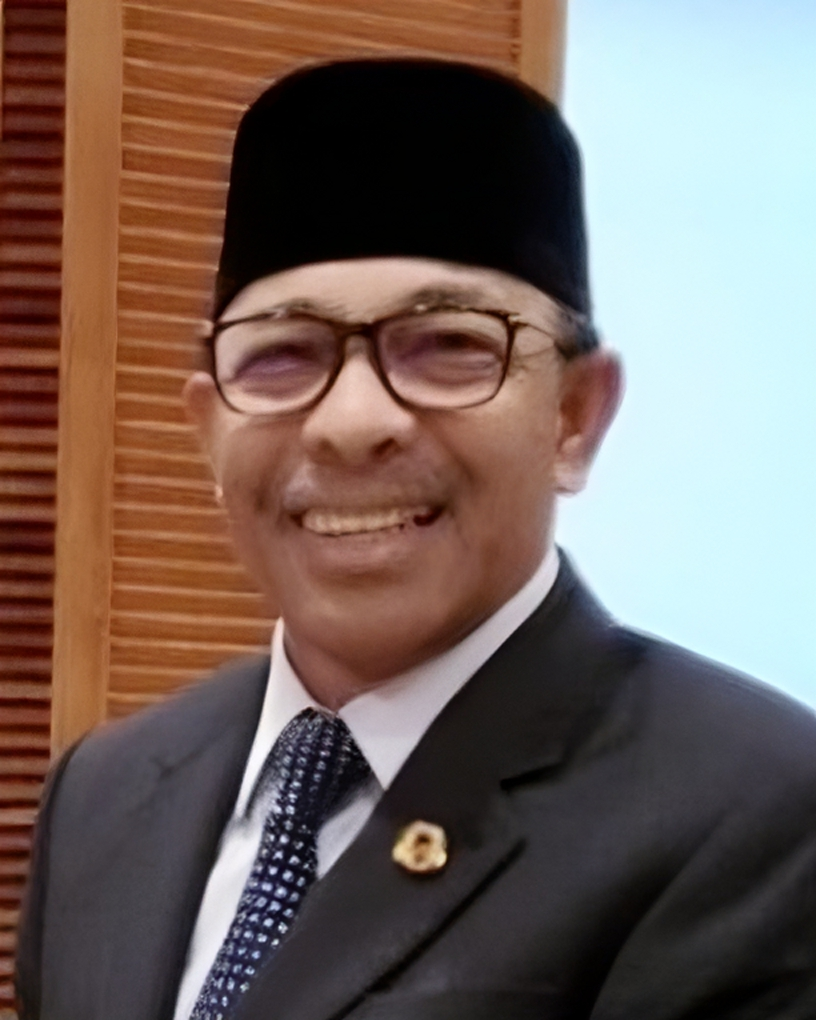
- Minister Suhaimi in 2018

7th Minister of Development
- In office 30 January 2018 – 7 June 2022
- Monarch: Hassanal Bolkiah
- Deputy: Marzuke Mohsin
- Preceded by: Bahrin Abdullah
- Succeeded by: Juanda Abdul Rashid

4th Deputy Minister of Development
- In office 22 October 2015 – 30 January 2018
- Minister: Bahrin Abdullah
- Preceded by: Ali Apong
- Succeeded by: Marzuke Mohsin

Personal details
- Born: Brunei
- Education: ASEAN Academy of Engineering and Technology (BE)
- Profession: Politician and civil engineer

Suhaimi bin Haji Gafar is a Bruneian politician and civil engineer who formerly served as the seventh Minister of Development from 2018 to 2022, and also the Deputy Minister from 2015 to 2018.

== Education ==
Suhaimi obtained his Bachelor of Engineering (BE) with civil engineering speciality from the ASEAN Academy of Engineering and Technology.

== Early career ==
In the Public Works Department, Suhaimi began his career in the government in 1985 as an engineer. He has held the following positions in the division; an engineer in 1985; working engineer in 1991; assistant director of Roads in 1996; Director of Roads in 2001; Director of Water Services in 2003; Director of Development in 2003; Director of Water Services in 2005; Deputy Director General of Public Works in 2005; Director General of Public Works in 2008. He was assigned to the Ministry of Development's Permanent Secretary (Technical and Professional) post in 2010.

== Ministerial career ==
During a cabinet reshuffle on 22 October 2015, Suhaimi was named deputy minister of development.

On 30 January 2018, at 2.30 p.m., the Sultan of Brunei, Hassanal Bolkiah, unexpectedly reshuffled the cabinet. Dato Suhaimi will be appointed as the new Minister of Development as part of the announcement. The Temburong Bridge, which is expected to be the longest oversea bridge in Southeast Asia, is now 75% finished and on schedule to be finished by November 2019, and after correcting work, which would take three to five months to complete, the B$1.6 billion project is anticipated to open to the public in 2020, Dato Suhaimi said on 14 February 2019. It was under his tenure, to witness the opening of the bridge on 17 March 2020.

In 2021, there would be 229,496 tonnes (225,871 long tons; 252,976 short tons) of rubbish disposed of in landfills, according to a statement for World Environment Day from Dato Suhaimi. According to the minister, it makes up the second-highest percentage of garbage in landfills, and during a national drive to collect marine debris from beaches, plastics, primarily plastic bottles, made up 80% of the trash that was gathered. He further stated:

As a person who inhabits on this Earth, we can tackle these issues by collectively incorporating the concept of sustainability into our lifestyle, with ‘Whole-of-Government’ and ‘Whole-of-Nation’ approaches. Simple sustainable lifestyle choices can be made through the switch to using re-usables and reducing the consumption of disposable or single-use plastics...

— Dato Seri Setia Ir Suhaimi Gafar, TheStar, 5 June 2022

In order to manage water sustainably, the Sultanate is dedicated to engaging with the local community, regional participants, and international participants. In his speech at the 4th Asia-Pacific Water Summit (4thAPWS) in Kumamoto, Japan on 23 April 2022, Dato Suhaimi bin Haji Gafar reaffirmed the Sultanate's commitment to tackling water concerns. Similar to the announcement of his appointment as minister, he was replaced by Dato Juanda after another cabinet reshuffle on 7 June later that year.

The B$13 million Lugu flyover project, one of Dato Suhaimi's last initiatives, was formally inaugurated on 20 February 2022, with the goal of enhancing road connectivity for Lugu residential neighbourhoods and granting essential access to the Muara–Tutong Highway. Safety barriers and double bridges were also included in the project. As part of Brunei's Green National Strategy under Wawasan Brunei 2035, 500 tree seedlings were also planted at the location with the goal of increasing forest coverage and carbon sinks through reforestation. Following a cabinet reshuffle on 7 June 2022, his tenure as minister of development came to an end.

== Honours ==
Bahrin has earned the following honours;

- Order of Setia Negara Brunei First Class (PSNB; 15 July 2018) – Dato Seri Setia;
- Order of Setia Negara Brunei Third Class (SNB; 15 July 2010)
- Order of Seri Paduka Mahkota Brunei First Class (SPMB; 15 July 2017) – Dato Seri Paduka
- Excellent Service Medal (PIKB)
- Long Service Medal (PKL)
- Sultan of Brunei Silver Jubilee Medal (5 October 1992)
- National Day Silver Jubilee Medal (23 February 2009)

Political offices
Preceded by Bahrin Abdullah	7th Minister of Development; 30 January 2018 – 7 June 2022	Succeeded by Juanda Abdul Rashid
Preceded by Ali Apong	4th Deputy Minister of Development; 22 October 2015 – 30 January 2018	Succeeded by Marzuke Mohsin
