= List of banks in Brunei =

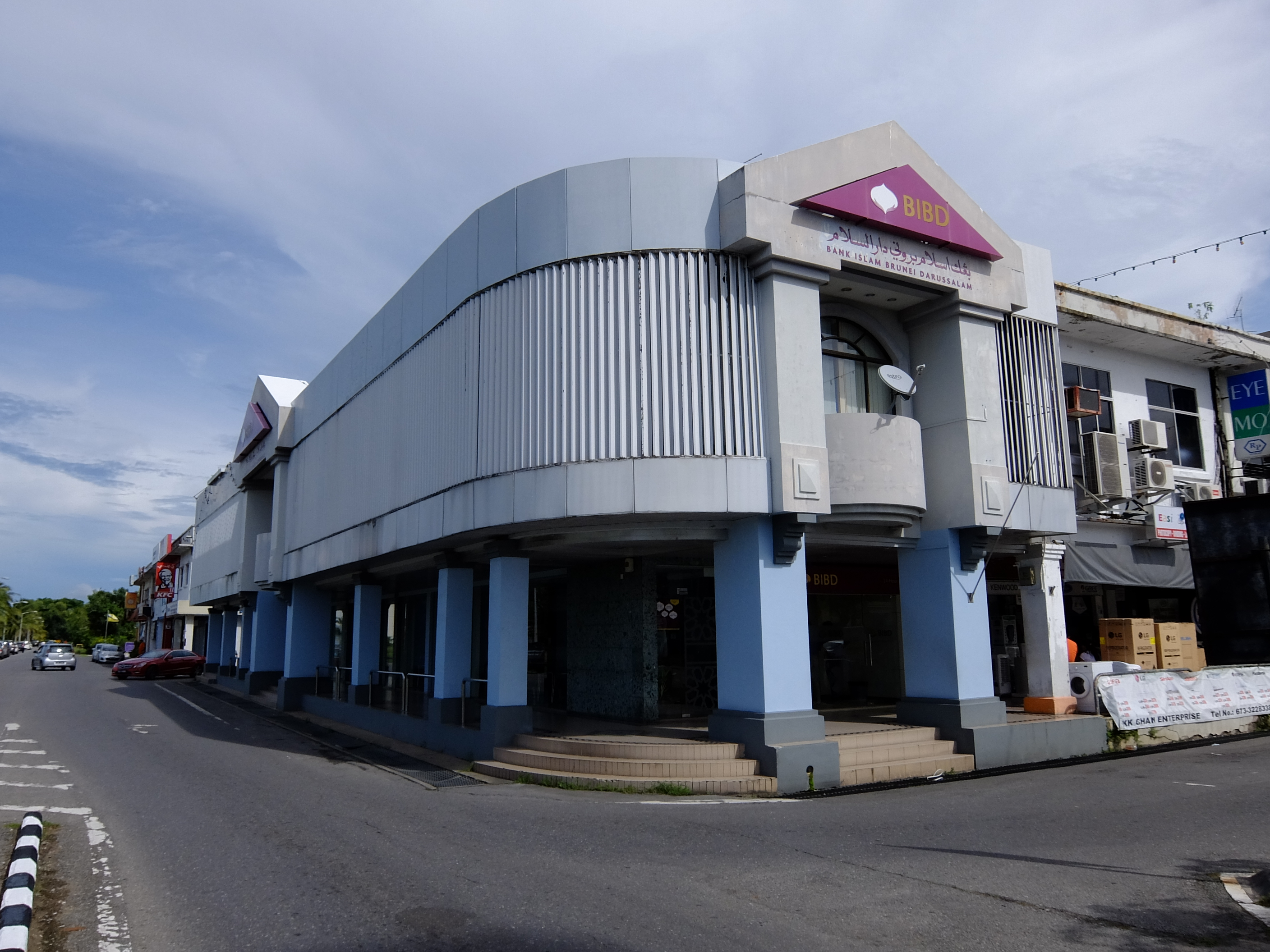
Bank Islam Brunei Darussalam

This is a list of banks in Brunei.

== Central Bank ==
- Brunei Darussalam Central Bank (BDCB)

== Local Banks ==
- Bank Islam Brunei Darussalam (BIBD)
- Baiduri Bank

== Foreign Banks ==
- Maybank (Malaysia)
- RHB Bank (Malaysia)
- Standard Chartered Bank (United Kingdom)
- United Overseas Bank (Singapore)
- Bank of China (China)

== Trust Fund ==
- Perbadanan Tabung Amanah Islam Brunei (TAIB)

== Finance Companies ==
- Baiduri Finance (Local)
- BIBD At-Tamwil (Local)

== Defunct banks in Brunei ==
- The Islamic Development Bank of Brunei (Local)
- The Islamic Bank of Brunei (Local)
- Citibank (Foreign)
- HSBC (Foreign)
