= Marzuke Mohsin =

Bruneian politician and architect

Dato Seri Paduka Marzuke Mohsin SPMB SNB PJK PIKB PKL
- مرزوقي محسن

5th Deputy Minister of Development
- In office 10 August 2018 – 7 June 2022
- Monarch: Hassanal Bolkiah
- Minister: Suhaimi Gafar
- Preceded by: Suhaimi Gafar
- Succeeded by: Position abolished

Personal details
- Born: Brunei
- Education: Leeds Polytechnic (BA); North London Polytechnic (PgD); Universiti Brunei Darussalam (MBA)
- Profession: Politician; architect

Marzuke bin Haji Mohsin is a Bruneian politician, civil servant and architect who served as the fifth Deputy Minister of Development (MoD) from 2018 to 2022. Additionally, he is a council member of Universiti Teknologi Brunei, chairman of Safety, Health and Environment National Authority, and an architect at Eco Bumi Partners.

== Education ==
Marzuke graduated with honours from Leeds Polytechnic in 1985 with a Bachelor of Arts in architecture and from North London Polytechnic in 1990 with a Post Graduate Diploma in architecture. He has been a Corporate Expert of Pertubuhan Ukur Jurutera & Arkitek (PUJA) since 1993 and a Chartered Member of the Royal Institute of British Architects (RIBA). In 2005, he resumed his studies at Universiti Brunei Darussalam, where he pursued a Master of Business Administration.

== Political career ==
In 1985, Marzuke started working for the Public Works Department (JKR) as an architect. In 1994, he was moved to senior architect, and the following year, he was elevated to executive architect. In 2001, he was promoted to Assistant Director of Development, and in 2005, he was appointed Director of Development. He was named Head of JKR in 2012 after serving as Director of Housing Development Department (JKP) from 2009 to 2011. On 10 March 2014, he was named Deputy Permanent Secretary of the MoD.

Marzuke was named the Deputy Minister of Development on 10 August 2018, and on 2 October, there was an oath-taking ceremony in the Istana Nurul Iman. Later at the 21st Ministry-Level QCC Convention, Marzuke pushed for the expansion of the Quality Control Circle (QCC) Convention approach to all departments within the Ministry of Development in order to enhance public services on 29 August. During the Cosmopolitan College of Commerce and Technology's 12th Convocation Ceremony on 28 November, he stressed the importance of graduates as major forces behind nation-building and urged them to make use of their knowledge, be creative, and contribute to society while carrying out Islamic ideals.

First Regional Faraday Challenge 2019 and Asia Pacific Community Volunteer Conference (AP-CVC) 2019 were organised by the Institution of Engineering and Technology (IET) Brunei Darussalam Local Network on 5 October 2019, at the Aman Hills Hotel, which he formally opened.

Marzuke oversaw the foundation laying of the 15.4189-acre Sultan Hassan Secondary School in Kampong Batu Apoi in July 2021. He led the Brunei delegation at the ASEAN–China High Ranking Forum on Green and Sustainable Development, which was conducted by video conference from 24 to 26 October 2021.

During the Operational Document Taskforce Workshop for the Brunei Darussalam National Climate Change Policy (BNCCP) on Waste Management, Marzuke stressed the significance of addressing Brunei's increasing waste generation through an integrated action plan, with a focus on waste minimisation, waste-to-energy technologies, and raising public awareness. In March 2022, he stressed that in order to improve public services and expedite decision-making in land development and building projects, government agencies, particularly those under the MoD, must embrace data-sharing of geospatial information. During a cabinet reshuffle on 7 June 2022, his ministerial career came to an end.

== Honours ==
Marzuke has earned the following honours;

- Order of Seri Paduka Mahkota Brunei First Class (SPMB; 15 July 2019) – Dato Seri Paduka
- Order of Setia Negara Brunei Third Class (SNB; 15 July 2010)
- Order of Setia Negara Brunei Fourth Class (PSB; 1996)
- Meritorious Service Medal (PJK; October 2009)
- Excellent Service Medal (PIKB; 2002)
- Long Service Medal (PKL; October 2010)
- ASEAN Federation of Engineering Organisations (AFEO) Distinguished Honorary Patron (2021)

Political offices
Preceded by Suhaimi Gafar	5th Deputy Minister of Development; 10 August 2018 – 7 June 2022	Succeeded by Office abolished
