= Brunei National Roads System =

Brunei National Roads System (Sistem Jalan Kebangsaan Brunei) (سيستم جالن كبڠسأن بروني)
- Symbol of the Brunei Highways

System information
- Maintained by Public Works Department

Highway names

System links
- Brunei National Roads System

Brunei National Roads System (Malay; Sistem Jalan Kebangsaan Brunei: Jawi; سيستم جالن كبڠسأن بروني) is the main national road network in Brunei. It was built and maintained by the Public Works Department.

Major highways in Brunei are built under dual carriageway standards, while other roads are built as single carriageways. Road signs are coloured green with white text (white with black text for denoting nearby locations).

== Speed limits ==
The maximum speed limit for dual carriageways in Brunei is generally 100 km/h. Meanwhile, the maximum speed limit for single-carriageway roads is 80 km/h. Lower speed limits may apply in urban areas.

== List of roads and highways ==
=== Highways ===
- Lumut–Belait Highway
- Muara–Tutong Highway
- Sultan Hassanal Bolkiah Highway
- Tungku Highway
- Tungku–Jerudong Highway
- Duli Pengiran Muda Mahkota Al-Muhtadee Billah Highway
- Tutong–Telisai Highway
- Seria By Pass Highway
- Telisai–Lumut Highway
- Brunei–Temburong Highway including Temburong Bridge

=== Notable roads ===
- Jalan Utama Berakas
- Jalan Serasa
- Jalan Muara
