= QTSS =

QTSS may refer to:

- Queenstown Secondary School, a secondary school in Queenstown, Singapore
- QuickTime Streaming Server, a server that was built into Apple's Mac OS X Server until OS X Server 10.6.8
