= Bank Islam Brunei Darussalam =

Islamic bank in Brunei

Coordinates: 4.8884701°N 114.9422676°E

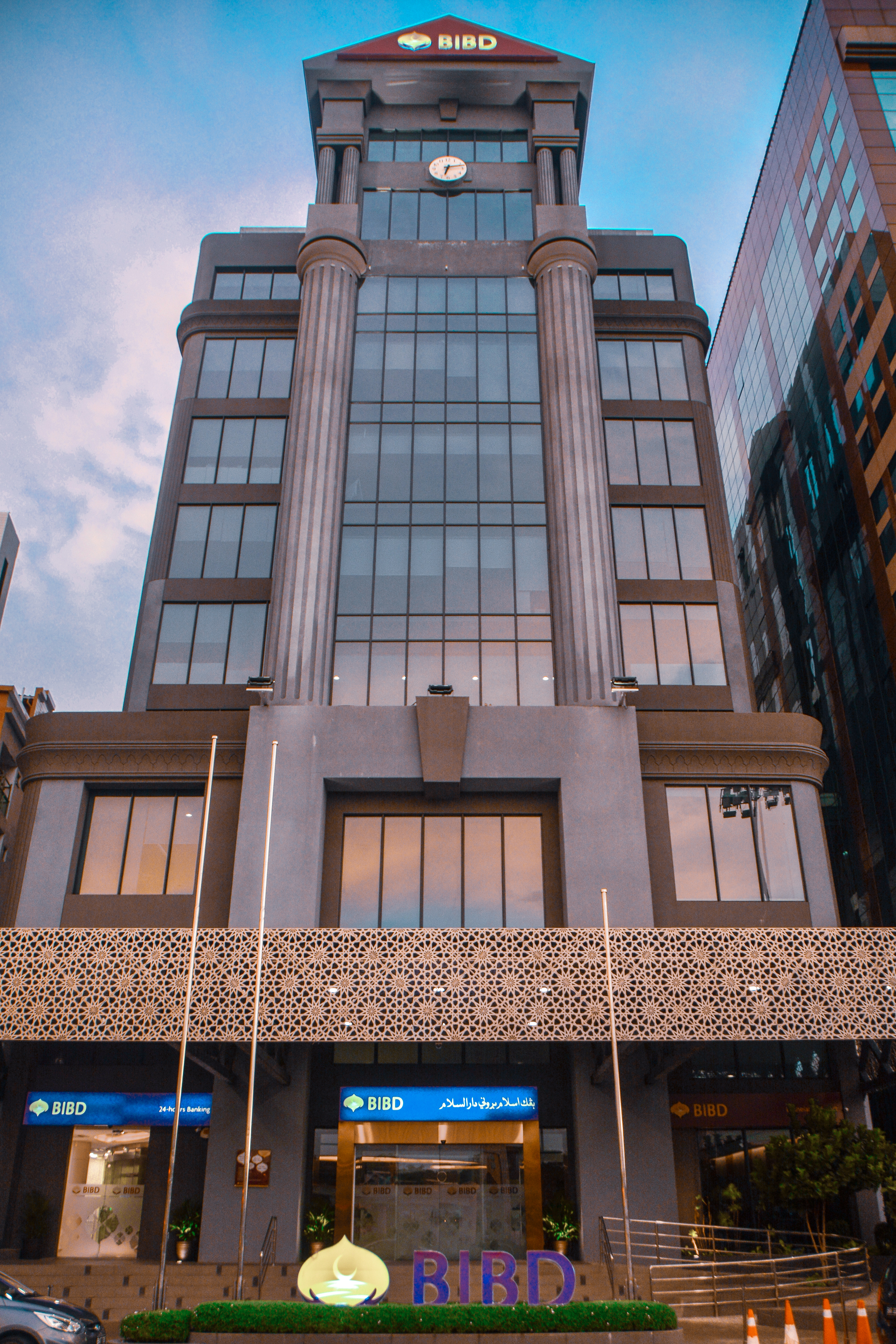
- BIBD headquarters in Pusat Bandar, Brunei
- Trade name: BIBD
- Native name: بڠک إسلام بروني دار السلام
- Company type: Private
- Industry: Islamic banking
- Predecessor: Development Bank of Brunei; Islamic Development Bank of Brunei
- Founded: 2005; 21 years ago
- Headquarters: Lot 159, Jalan Pemancha, Bandar Seri Begawan, Brunei BS8711
- Area served: Brunei
- Key people: Chairman: Amin Liew; CEO: Junaidi Masri
- Products: Financial services
- Services: Retail banking; investment banking; corporate banking; wealth management; finance and insurance; credit cards
- Revenue: ▲$376.5 million BND (2023)
- Operating income: ▲$178.7 million BND (2023)
- Total assets: ▲$11.244 billion BND (2024)
- Number of employees: c. 900 (2021)
- Parent: Brunei Investment Agency
- Subsidiaries: BIBD At-Tamwil; BIBD Securities; BIBD (Middle East); Syarikat Takaful Brunei Darussalam
- Rating: S&P: A−
- Website: www.bibd.com.bn

Bank Islam Brunei Darussalam (BIBD) is the main Islamic financial institution and the largest bank in Brunei. With the biggest network of branches and ATMs strategically placed throughout Brunei's four districts, BIBD has its headquarters situated in Bandar Seri Begawan.

== Overview ==
In Brunei, BIBD is the biggest Islamic bank. With B$10.7 billion in assets, the bank provides services to more than 200,000 retail, corporate, and foreign clients throughout Brunei. With its main office located in Pusat Bandar, BIBD has eighteen offices strategically placed throughout Brunei's four districts: Temburong, Brunei-Muara, Tutong, and Belait. Serving more than 25% of Bruneians, BIBD is the primary Islamic bank in the country and has the biggest contact center with digital mobile chat capabilities. It also has the largest ATM network in the nation.

The BIBD Group, which comprises the companies BIBD At-Tamwil, BIBD Securities, and BIBD (Middle East) Limited, reported $342.9 million in sales in 2018, a 5.2% increase over $325.9 million in revenue the previous year. A total of 724,749,512 ordinary shares, or B$133.2 million, have been granted to shareholders, according to BIBD's 2019 annual report. A 51 percent rise from 2018 to 18.38 cents per share was authorised by the bank's board of directors. According to the financial institution, in 2019 stockholders earned a return on equity of 12.3%.

== History ==
Initially founded in 1981 as the Island Development Bank (IDB), the financial organisation had several changes throughout time. On 13 January 1993, it was renamed the Islamic Bank of Brunei (IBB) and relocated to its current multi-million dollar building, while the Development Bank of Brunei (DBB) was established in 1995. Afterwards, DBB changed its name to the Islamic Development Bank of Brunei (IDBB) in 2001. In 2005, IBB and IDBB underwent a crucial merger that led to the establishment of Bank Islam Brunei Darussalam (BIBD). Sultan Hassanal Bolkiah inaugurated the Dar Takaful IBB Utama and Dar Takaful IBB2 buildings in Bandar Seri Begawan earlier on 5 May 2003.

After Fajr Capital obtained 29% stake BIBD in 2010, the bank underwent a transformation that culminated in the 2013 rebranding initiative. BIBD has achieved several noteworthy milestones, such as receiving an A− rating from S&P Global Ratings in 2015, introducing BIBD NEXGEN in 2018, and obtaining ISO 9001 Bureau Veritas Certification in 2019. As of 2019, there are 148,000 active users of BIBD's mobile application, which was recently relaunched under their digitization program, NEXGEN. In order to unify business operations and planning throughout the whole organisation, global enterprise software expert Ramco Systems announced the effective launch of its Enterprise Resource Planning (ERP) suite at BIBD in 2018.

As part of the bank's mobile payment strategy, BIBD chose the Rambus Token Service Provider (TSP) in 2019 to let its clients to conduct safe transactions. In January 2020, Fajr sold its shares to the BIA, so achieving full Bruneian ownership of the bank. BIBD won The Asian Banker's Best Managed Bank in Brunei award in 2019 and the Islamic Asset Manager of the Year title won by BIBD Asset Management in 2021. The adoption of IslamicMarkets Enterprise solutions by BIBD, as announced on 25 January 2021, by IslamicMarkets Limited. The BIBD Sustainability Leaders Awards will be introduced in 2023, according to BIBD, to honor and recognize young people in Brunei who are working to create a more sustainable future.

The bank has a long-standing history of supporting the government in achieving Wawasan Brunei 2035, both through its business practices as well as the bank's community-based initiatives such as BIBD Special Entrepreneurial Empowerment and Development Scheme (SEED) and BIBD ALAF. BIBD has also been a strong supporter of the development of local micro, small and medium enterprises (MSMEs) through its SME360 service.

== Senior leadership ==
- Managing Director and CEO: Junaidi bin Haji Masri (since 28 July 2022)
- Chairman: Mohd Amin Liew bin Abdullah (since 30 January 2018)

=== List of former chairmen ===
- Haji Abdullah bin Haji Bakar (2006–2010)
- Haji Yahya bin Haji Bakar (2010–2013)
- Haji Bahrin bin Abdullah (2013–2018)

=== List of former MD and CEOs ===
- Haji Muhammad Syaippudin bin Haji Abdullah (2006–2008)
- Javed Ahmad bin Kamil Hasan (2008–2015)
- Mubashar H. Khokhar (2015–2021)
- Hajah Noraini binti Haji Sulaiman (2021–2022)

== Shareholders ==
BIBD's website provides shareholders with access to information on the bank's financials, operations, and enterprises. This information is updated whenever there is a significant development in these domains, thus guaranteeing openness and complete disclosure of relevant information. The Sultan Haji Hassanal Bolkiah Foundation (YSHHB) and some 6,000 private Bruneian investors are among the other owners of BIBD, with the largest holding held by the government of Brunei through Brunei Investment Agency (BIA) and the Ministry of Finance and Economy (MoFE).

The four largest shareholders as of 2020 are:

	Name of Shareholders	%
1.	Khazanah Satu Sdn Bhd	33.87
2.	Salam Investments Limited	29.73
3.	Yayasan Sultan Haji Hassanal Bolkiah	25.24
4.	Public	11.16

== Subsidiaries ==
BIBD Group expands its reach through a number of wholly owned subsidiaries in addition to its main banking services. A subsidiary of BIBD At Tamwil Bhd is devoted to offering Islamic hire purchase options. In the meanwhile, BIBD Securities Sdn Bhd is focused on providing brokerage services and Islamic wealth management solutions for international stocks listed on the Singapore and Kuala Lumpur stock exchanges as well as local BIBD shares. Through its subsidiaries, Takaful Brunei Am and Takaful Brunei Keluarga, Syarikat Takaful Brunei Darussalam plays a crucial role in providing General and Family Takaful services. BIBD (Middle East) Limited functions as a wholly owned subsidiary under the regulation of the Dubai Financial Services Authority (DFSA), with a primary focus on offering Islamic financial services.

== Awards ==
- Best Retail Bank in Brunei by The Asian Banker (2013–2021)
- Strongest Bank in Brunei by Balance Sheet (since 2016)
- Safest Bank in Brunei by Global Finance (2016–2021)
- Best Managed Bank in Brunei by The Asian Banker (2019)
- Brunei's Bank of The Year by The Banker (2020–2021; 2023)
- Best Bank for Islamic Wealth Management Solutions in Brunei Darussalam by Cambridge Islamic Funds Awards (2024)
