= Telisai–Lumut Highway =

Highway in Brunei

Coordinates: 4.6761261°N 114.5354309°E

Telisai–Lumut Highway

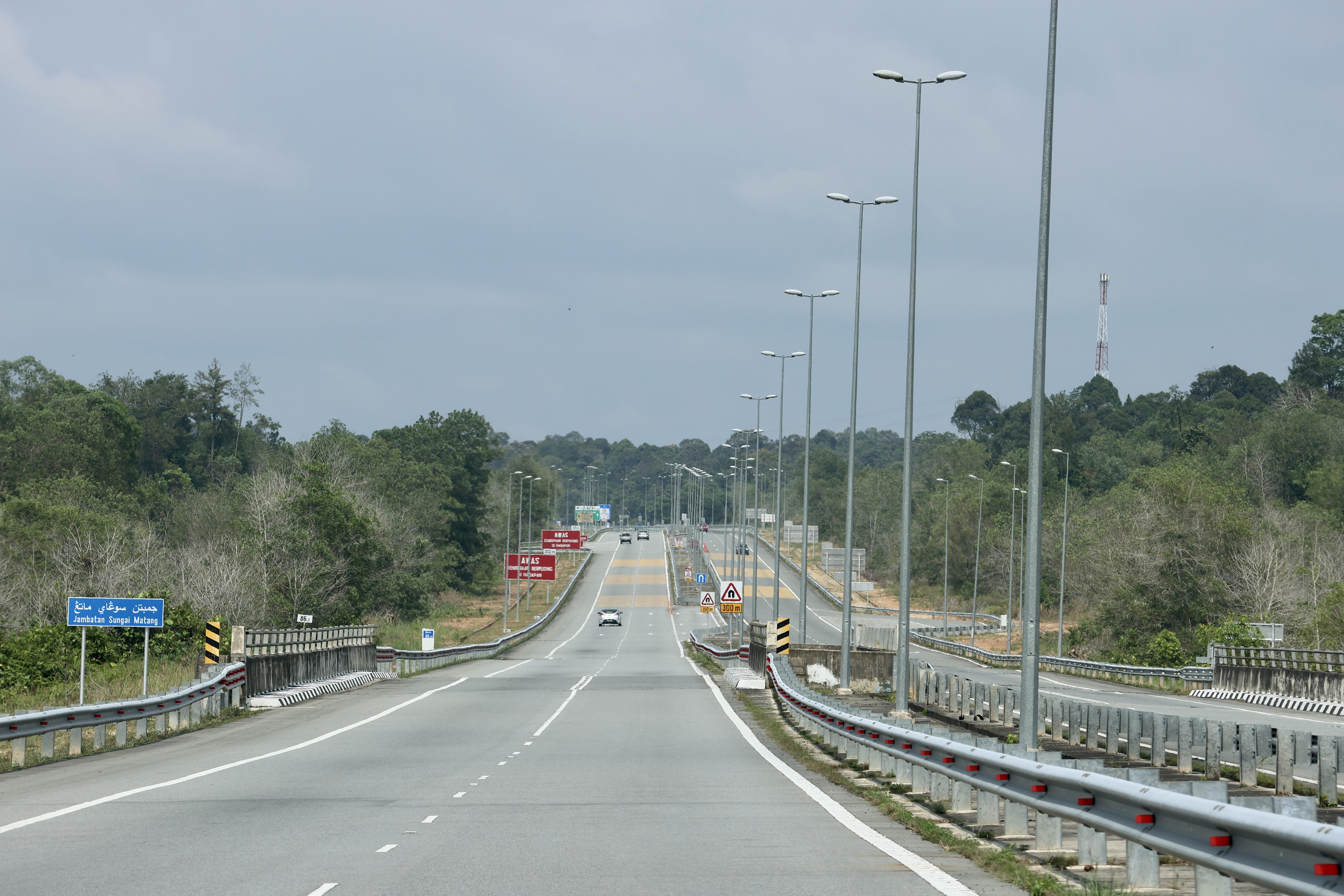

Route information
- Maintained by Public Works Department
- Length: 18.636 km (11.580 mi)
- History: Started in February 2010; Expected completion in February 2013; Opened 28 June 2016

Major junctions
- South-West end: Lumut (KM0)
- Jalan Labi (KM5.1); Jalan Penghubung Sungai Paku (KM10.37)
- North-East end: Telisai (KM18.636)

Location
- Country: Brunei
- Districts: Tutong, Belait
- Villages: Telisai, Sungai Paku, Labi, Sungai Liang, Lumut

Highway system
- Brunei National Roads System

Telisai–Lumut Highway is the third highway in Brunei Darussalam, being the other two which is the Muara–Tutong Highway and Sultan Hassanal Bolkiah Highway. The new highway was completed in late June 2016, and has been handled by the Brunei Economic Development Board (BEDB).

This dual carriageway will be built from Lumut Bypass (dual carriageway) stretching eastwards through the woods at about 3 kilometres south of the remaining stretch of Jalan Tutong-Seria (see note) (single carriageway), merging with the dual carriageway Tutong Bypass at north-east. The total length of the highway is 18.6 kilometres (11.6 miles).

The new highway will ease traffic between Tutong and Kuala Belait, cutting travel times between the affected stretch.

After more than 3 years delay, the highway was finally opened for public use on 28 June 2016.

== Notes ==
- Parts of the original Jalan Tutong-Seria single carriageway had been replaced by Tutong Bypass and Lumut Bypass dual carriageways, leaving the Telisai-Sungai Liang stretch only used by regulars.
