= Department of Environment, Parks and Recreation =

Government agency of Brunei

Coordinates: 4.8883111°N 114.9308337°E

- Jabatan Alam Sekitar, Taman dan Rekreasi جابتن عالم سکيتر تامن دان ريکرياسي
- National emblem of Brunei

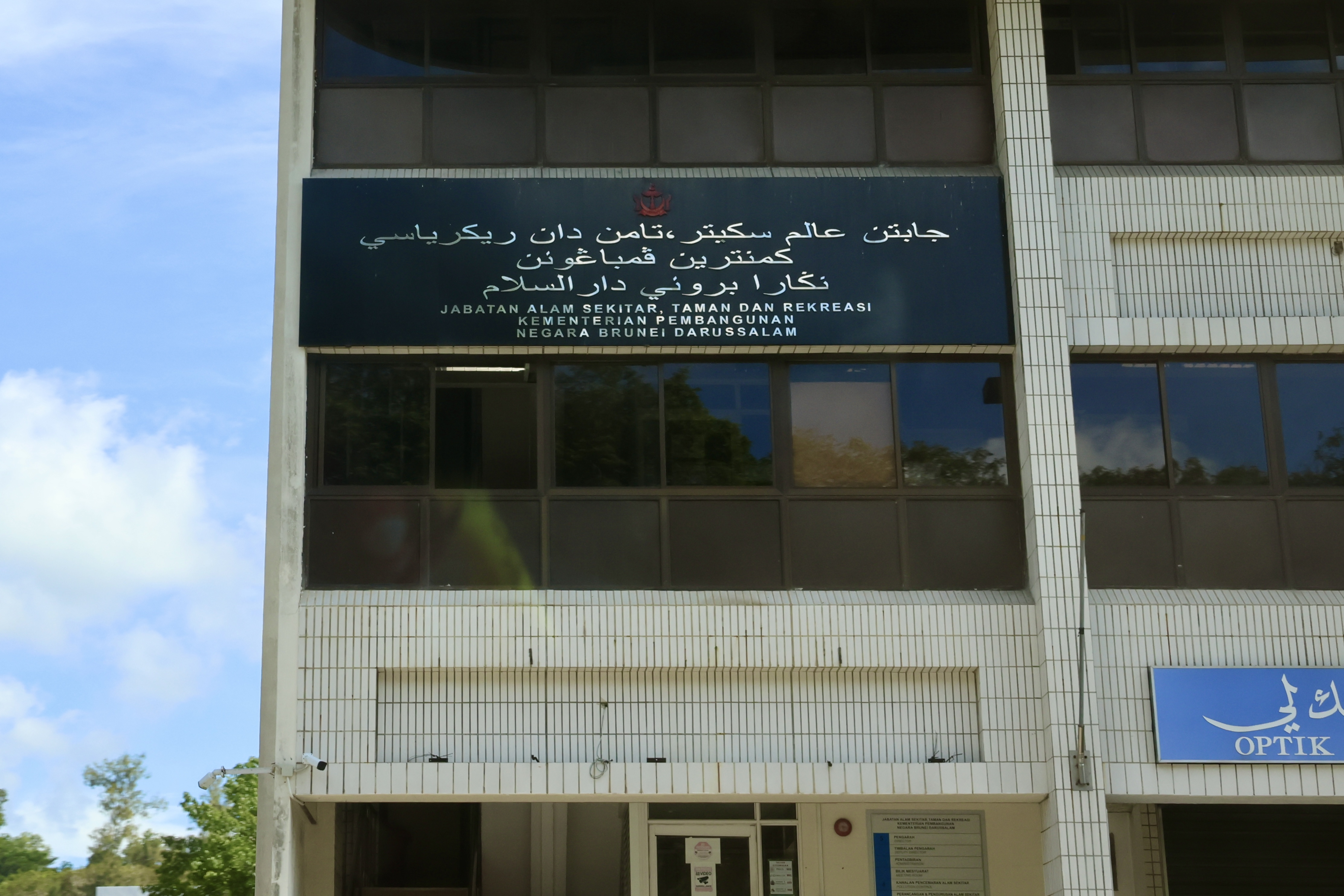
- JASTRe headquarters

Agency overview
- Formed: 1993; 33 years ago
- Jurisdiction: Government of Brunei
- Headquarters: Tumasek Plaza Building, Jalan Raja Isteri Pengiran Anak Saleha, Bandar Seri Begawan, Brunei BA2111
- Minister responsible: Juanda Abdul Rashid, Minister of Development
- Agency executive: Martinah Tamit, Director
- Parent agency: Ministry of Development
- Website: www.env.gov.bn

The Department of Environment, Parks and Recreation (Malay: Jabatan Alam Sekitar, Taman dan Rekreasi; Jawi: جابتن عالم سکيتر، تامن دان ريکرياسي; abbrev: JASTRe), also referred to as the Environment Unit, is a department overseen by the Ministry of Development. The Pollution Control Guidelines for Industrial Development in Brunei are under the custody of JASTRe.

== Background ==
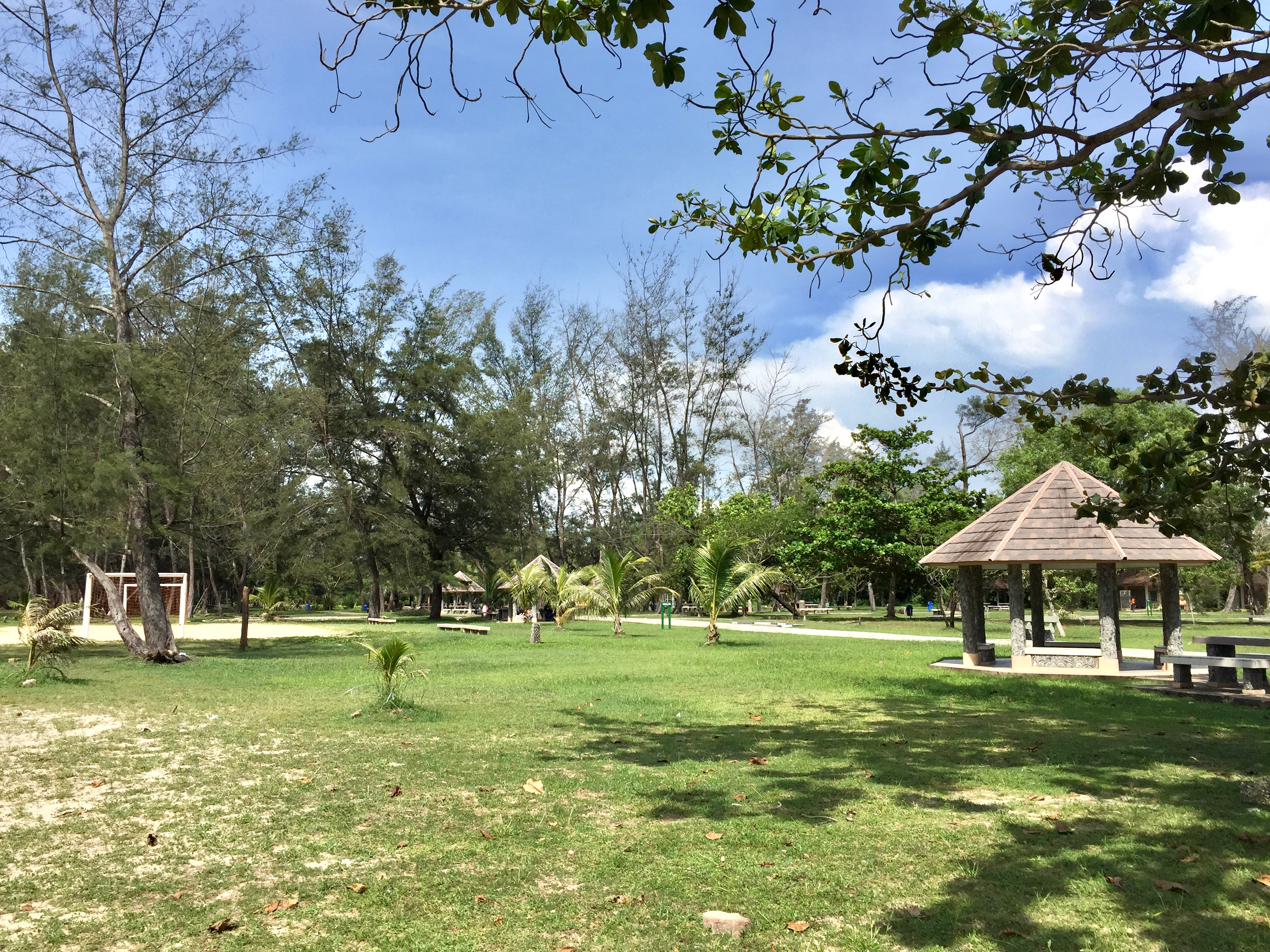
Muara Beach Recreational Park

In order to improve living standards and national economic competitiveness, the Department of Environment, Parks, and Recreation strives to preserve a good environment. 'Environmentally Sustainable Nation' designation for Brunei. It tries to preserve the environment and safeguard it so that it can continue to be clean, green, and safe. JASTRe estimates that daily trash deliveries to the landfill in Sungai Paku, Tutong range from 400–500 tonnes (390–490 long tons; 440–550 short tons). One person was predicted to produce 1.4 kilograms (3.1 lb) of garbage per day in 2015, of which 18% was paper. The following park and recreational facilities are under JASTRe:

=== Brunei-Muara District ===
- Muara Beach Recreational Park
- Serasa Recreational Beach
- Menteri Besar Recreational Park
- Damuan Recreational Park
- Mini Parit Recreational Park

=== Tutong District ===
- Pengkalan Pinang Recreational Beach

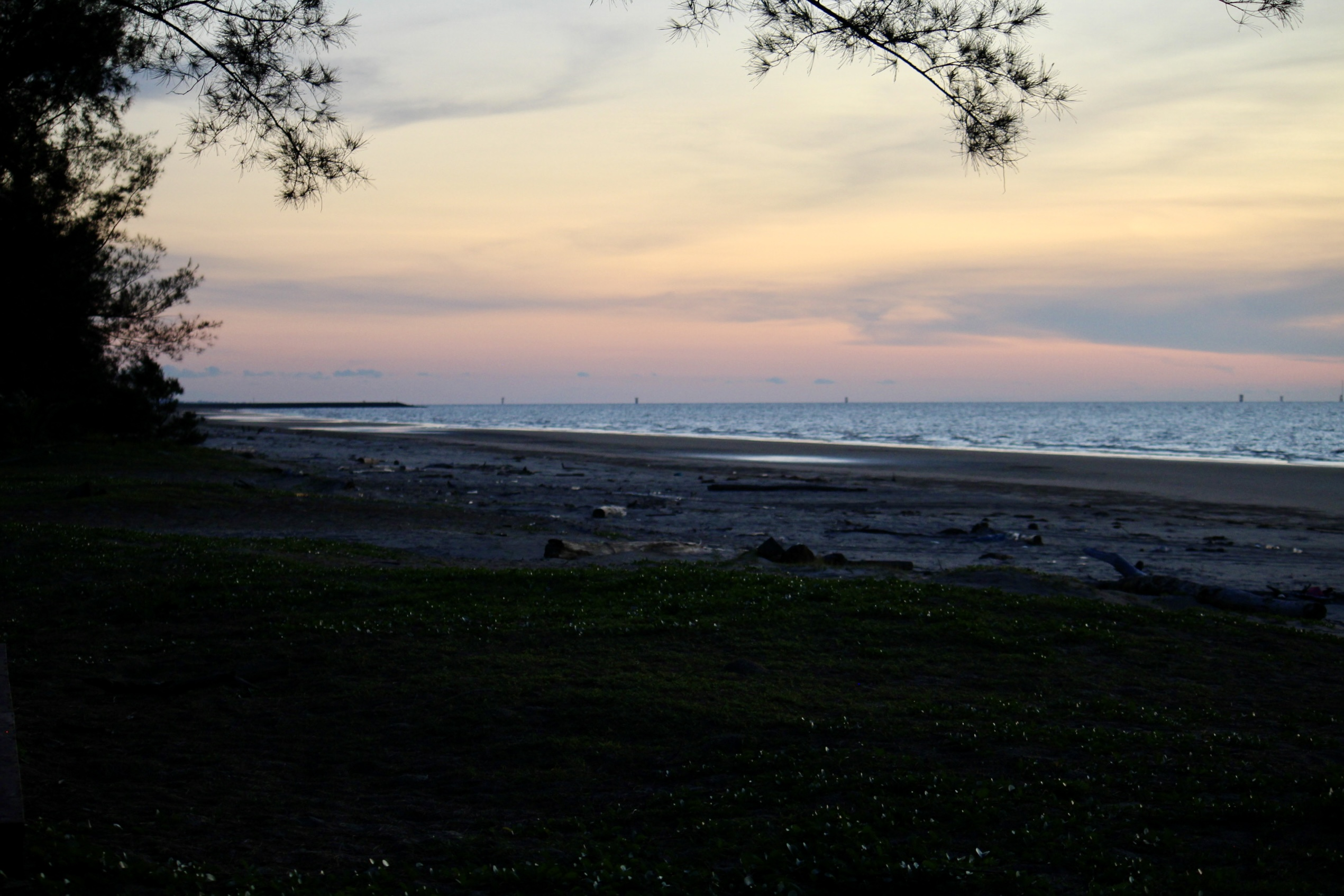
Lumut Recreational Beach

=== Belait District ===
- Lumut Recreational Beach
- Jubilee Anduki Recreational Park
- Sungai Mau Recreational Park
- Wasai Wong Kadir Recreational Park

=== Temburong District ===
- Batang Duri Recreational Park
- Muhibbah Recreational Park
- Taman Persiaran

== Legislation ==
=== Municipal Board Act (1920) ===
An Act to Consolidate and Modify the Municipal Boards Law.

=== Water Supply Act (1962) ===
This Act's main objective is to manage and regulate Brunei's water supply. The Water Authority is in charge of managing the supply and distribution of water as well as the maintenance and management of the waterworks. The Authority may also be given the authority to: declare any area of land or water to be a catchment area for the purpose of water supply; enter any land for the purpose of building, repairing, or maintaining waterworks; provide any person with water for domestic purposes; restrict or suspend the supply of water; cut off the supply of water in default of payment; demand deposits; and other things. The Act also outlines offenses related to water pollution, waste, obstruction, etc., as well as the construction and connection of pipes and fittings for the supply of water from the waterworks.

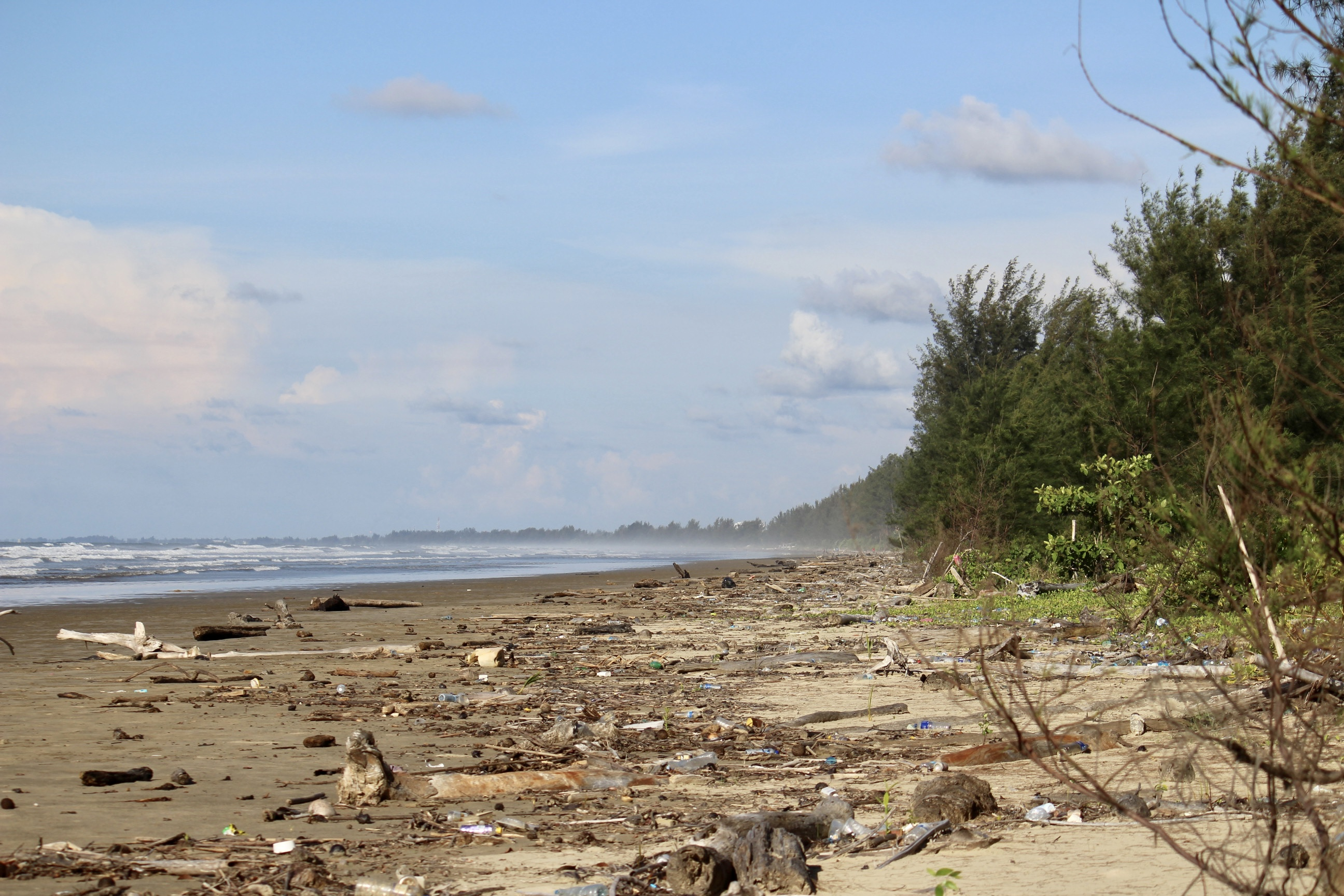
Litter seen accumulating on the Belait Beach in 2022

=== Hazardous Waste (Control of Export and Transit) Order (2013) ===
The guidelines for disposing of hazardous waste are laid out in this Order. It specifically defines waste as any waste that meets any of the criteria listed in Annex III to the Basel Convention or waste that falls under any of the categories listed in Annex I to the Basel Convention, unless it does not meet any of the criteria listed in Annex III to the Basel Convention. However, radioactive wastes and hazardous waste are excluded from this definition. Requirements for exports and transits to other countries, environmentally sound management of hazardous or other waste, substances not categorized as hazardous or other waste, a deadline for compliance with permit conditions, etc. are all covered by this provision. The Director of Environment, Parks and Recreation is the appropriate official to grant environmental licenses.

=== Environmental Protection and Management Order (2016) ===
The Environmental Protection and Management requirements are established by this Order, which has 41 sections, eight Parts, and two Schedules. This Order, which is applicable to Brunei Darussalam's territory, states that everyone has a responsibility to: (a) take, to the extent that it is reasonably practicable, such measures to ensure the protection and management of the environment, and to prevent, reduce, or control any potential hazards that could lead to pollution or damage to the environment; and (b) comply with this Order's requirements. Which has the following divisions: Preliminary (Part I); Administration, including Delegation of Powers and Authority (Part II); General Duty of Person and Prescribed Activities, including Environmental Officer (Part III); Powers (Part IV); Investigation of Environmental Incidents (Part V); Offenses and Penalties (Part VI); Codes of Practice (Part VII); General (Part VIII). Prescribed Activities and Details in Written Notification of Prescribed Activities are covered in schedules.

== History ==
The National Committee on the Environment's secretariat and environmental-related matters were coordinated by the Environment Unit, which was established in 1993 under the Ministry of Development. The formation of the Department of Environment, Parks and Recreation under the Ministry of Development, where the department will also be responsible for issues of landscape and maintenance of recreational areas in the nation, was approved by His Majesty the Sultan and Yang Di Pertuan Brunei Darussalam, according to the Prime Minister's Office.

On 1 May 2002, the Department of Environment, Parks, and Recreation was established. The department currently deals with issues relating to environmental cooperation at the national, bilateral, and international levels as well as waste management, environmental conservation and management, management of landscape and recreational areas, and environment cooperation.

The Memorandum of Understanding (MoU) with Singapore on environmental cooperation was initially signed on 27 August 2005, by the Ministries of Development in Singapore and Brunei, respectively, and the Ministries of Environment and Water Resources in Singapore, respectively, on behalf of their respective governments. The strong ties between Singapore and Brunei in the areas of the environment and water have been strengthened by the environment ministers renewing the MoU on Bilateral Partnership in Environmental Affairs between the two Ministries on 26 February 2015. The parties signed a MoU to advance their mutually beneficial and equal collaboration in the areas of environmental protection and sustainable development.

== Organisational structure ==
The structure of the department is as follows:

- Director of Environment, Parks and Recreation
  - Deputy Director of Environment, Parks and Recreation
    - Head of International Affairs Unit
    - Head of Pollution Control Division
    - Head of Environmental Planning and Management Division
    - Head of Landscape Division
    - Head of Parks and Recreation
    - Head of Belait Branch
    - Head of Tutong Branch
    - Head of Temburong Branch
    - Head of Finance Unit
      - Head of Project Unit
    - Administration Division
      - Assistant Administrator

== Initiatives ==
=== Guidelines ===
For the purpose of controlling emissions, effluents, and discharge from various development and construction activities, the Pollution Control Guidelines for the Industrial Development in Brunei Darussalam was adopted in 2002. The Brunei Darussalam Environmental Impact Assessment Guidelines serve as a framework for project proponents to investigate, anticipate, and evaluate environmental impacts, as well as research potential environmental protection measures linked to specified activities. To support the Pollution Control Guidelines for the Industrial Development in Brunei Darussalam, Environmental Impact Assessment Guidelines for Brunei Darussalam are also established.

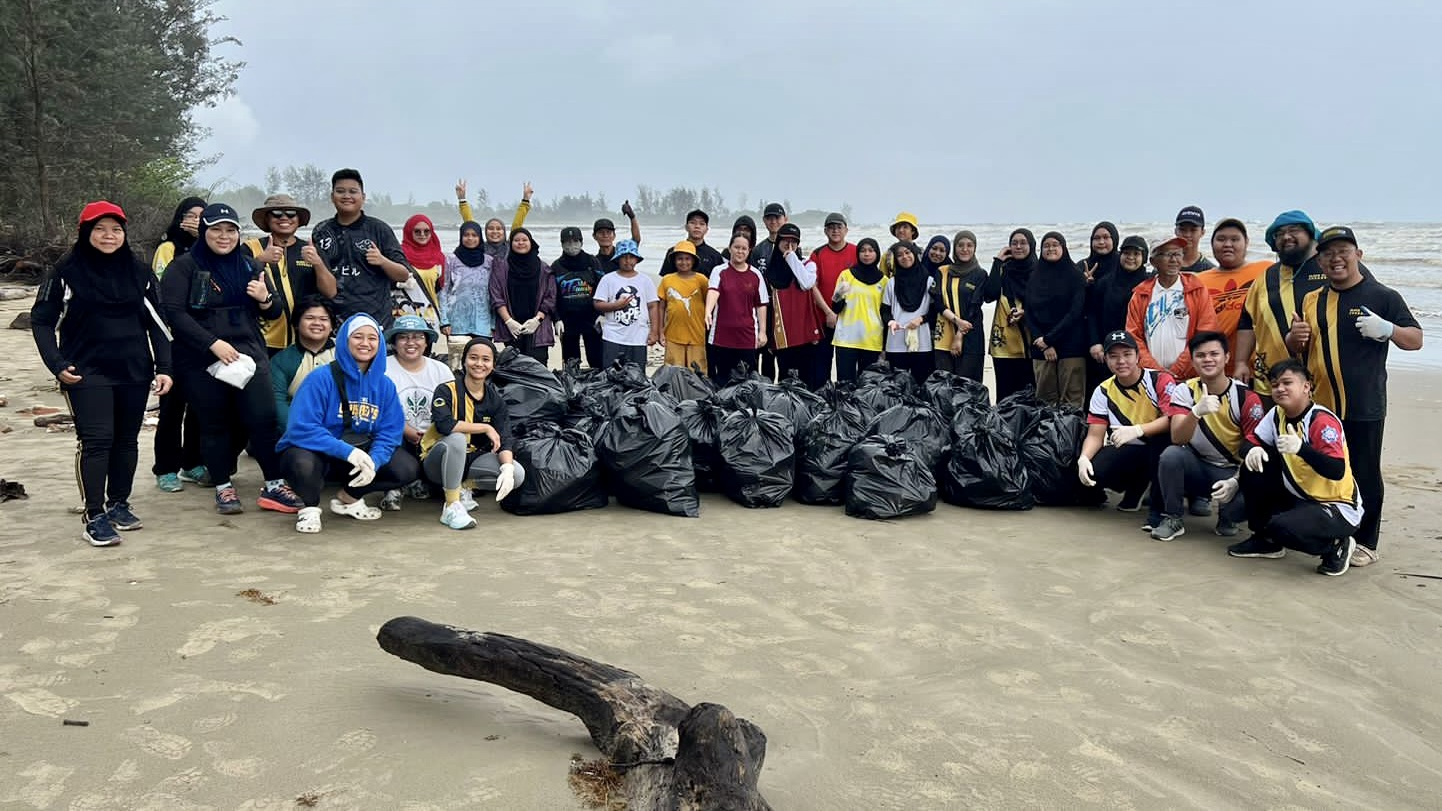
Beach cleanup conducted at Belait Beach in 2023

=== Beach Cleanup ===
JASTRe demonstrated their support by taking part in the RYS Beach Cleanup "RYS starts from You" on 22 November 2020. About 70 to 80 volunteers helped with the beach clean-up at Jerudong Beach in the early hours of the day. This resulted in the collection of about 750 kg of waste, the majority of which was plastic and abandoned nets.

On 11 June 2012, the Ministry of Development and JASTRe conducted a coastline cleaning at Meragang Beach and recovered 1,071 kg of trash, including 426 kg of plastic bottles.

Over 111 people, including Shell LiveWIRE Brunei alumni, staff from Progresif, and members of the general public, participated in a cleaning effort at Muara Beach on 23 September 2022. This beach clean-up is a part of Shell LiveWIRE Brunei's "Adopt-A-Beach" campaign, a neighborhood initiative designed to encourage people of all ages to take part in marine environment conservation and commit to maintaining Muara Beach's cleanliness for a year through a series of quarterly beach clean-ups. In collaboration with Progresif Sdn Bhd, JASTRE, the Ministry of Development, and the Beach Bunch Association, Shell LiveWIRE Brunei collected more than 241 kg of trash during the third Adopt-A-Beach initiative.

=== No Plastic Bag ===
As part of continuous efforts to limit the use of plastic and plastic waste products, JASTRe pushed its "No Plastic Bag" campaign. To conserve the environment and keep it free of pollution for the sake of future generations, the motto "It takes a nation to end plastic pollution" emphasizes the cooperation of all stakeholders, including private persons, governmental, private institutions, and organizations. Approximately 16% of the waste being supplied to Sungai Paku is made up of plastic waste, according to JASTRe figures. Plastic makes up around 20% of household waste in Brunei, especially during the holiday season.

=== Earth Day ===
As a follow-up to the "Take Your Action, Make A Difference" campaign that was launched on the 50th anniversary of Earth Day, the Ministry of Development is running a social media campaign through JASTRe in 2021. For World Environment Day in June 2021, the campaign will continue through that month. Several additional events have also been planned, including the expansion of the No Plastic Bag Every Day campaign to convenience stores, restaurants, and food stands. Its "Restore Our Earth" concept is centered on restoring the earth through minimizing and responding to the results of environmental harm, pollution, and climate change.

=== Recycling in Brunei ===
According to earlier information, there are six landfills in 2014. A daily average of 450 tonnes of trash are collected at the Sungai Paku dump, which has a 20-year lifespan, with 350 tonnes coming from the Brunei-Muara District. Currently operating recycling facilities in Brunei take a variety of recyclable material; some solely recycle scrap metal, while others accept plastic and paper. The JASTRe is still active in educating the general public about the value of protecting the environment and promoting recycling. One of the initiatives is to plan a JASTRe Recycling Day in the districts of Belait, Tutong, and Brunei Muara. JASTRe has welcomed a number of recycling businesses that offer garbage disposal together with recycling services for materials including steel, paper, and oil.

== See also ==
- Economy of Brunei
