= Prisons Department (Brunei) =

Government agency in Brunei

Coordinates: 4.8882607°N 114.8358990°E

- Jabatan Penjara جابتن فنجارا

Agency overview
- Formed: 1 March 1954; 72 years ago
- Jurisdiction: Government of Brunei
- Headquarters: Jalan Jerudong, Brunei–Muara, Brunei BG3122
- Annual budget: BND 3.768 million (2023)
- Minister responsible: Ahmaddin Abdul Rahman, Minister of Home Affairs
- Agency executive: Bahrin Yassin, Acting Director
- Parent agency: Ministry of Home Affairs
- Website: www.prisons.gov.bn

The Prisons Department (Malay: Jabatan Penjara) is a government agency under the Ministry of Home Affairs in Brunei, responsible for the management and administration of correctional facilities in accordance with the Prison Act and Prison Rules (Chapter 51 of the State Laws of Brunei Darussalam). Headquartered along Jalan Jerudong in the Brunei–Muara District, the department oversees the Jerudong Male Prison, Jerudong Female Prison, and Maraburong Prison. Its mission is to safeguard society through secure and humane custody while providing effective rehabilitation programmes aimed at transforming inmates into responsible and productive members of society, with the vision of becoming a leading rehabilitation institution.

The Prison Act (1979), which underwent two amendments in 1985 and 1989, serves as the foundation for the department's operations. The Criminal Procedure Act and the Penal Codes are also significant components of Brunei's criminal justice system.

== Overview ==
International standards are largely met by the conditions in Brunei's prisons and detention facilities. In 2013, there were 236 inmates at Maraburong Prison and 282 inmates at Jerudong Prison, 40 of whom were women (housed in a separate facility within the prison site). Juveniles are exempt from incarceration under Bruneian legislation. Nonetheless, adolescent offenders are sent by the courts to nearby rehabilitation facilities like Al-Hidayah. People awaiting trial made up about 10% of the prison population in 2013. Foreigners of different races, faiths, and nationalities made up over 25% of the prison population. There are five primary types of rehabilitation programs offered in Bruneian prisons: civic, social, moral, psychological, and physical rehabilitation.

The goal of all these initiatives is to influence prisoners to change their ways and become law-abiding, contributing members of society. Rehabilitative activities are not just carried out in correctional facilities; they also include other outreach programs outside of them to support convicts' families and promote their full rehabilitation and social reintegration. To help offenders recognise their current antisocial issues and ease their reintegration into society, the Bruneian government has provided basic counselling training to prison staff in all correctional facilities. According to a 2014 research, a large number of inmates experience relatively minor psychological issues like stress, anxiety, depression, and sleep difficulties.

== Prison history ==
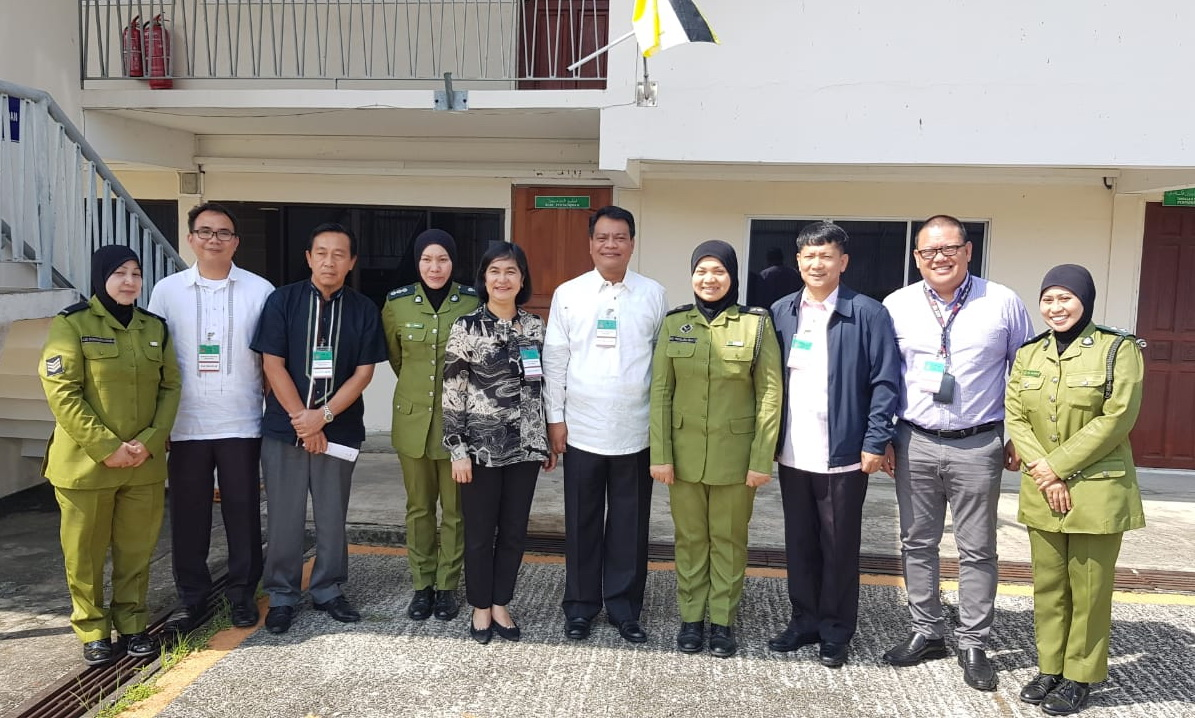
Philippine embassy's visit to the Women's Prison in 2019

Brunei's three correctional facilities are located in two areas: Jerudong Prison in Sengkurong 'A', Brunei–Muara, and Maraburong Prison in Keriam, Tutong. Jerudong Prison, the oldest in the country, was established by the Brunei Police Force on 1 March 1954, (Note: Although the police were in charge of its real administration, the assistant British Resident Morris was in charge of the prison department.) and the building could only accommodate 28 inmates. The prison was later transferred to the newly formed Prisons Department in 1959. In the early 1970s, rising security concerns due to prison break-outs and fugitive inmates led the government to recruit a significant number of retired Gurkhas from Singapore and Hong Kong to form a dedicated security force.

Jerudong Prison moved to its current location on 1 February 1980, with a capacity for 130 male and 16 female inmates. This facility receives all types of prisoners, including those on remand, those serving sentences from one day to life, death row inmates, and those under detention orders. The Women's Prison, which was initially managed by male prison officers, became a separate institution on 7 February 2002. It is located adjacent to the men's portion of Jerudong Prison.

Maraburong Prison, which opened on 1 August 2001, is specifically designed for male first- and second-time offenders. The facility includes a multipurpose hall, sports complex, high-security detention block, and a training center for cadets and wardens. The second phase of Maraburong Prison was completed in 2010, followed by the third in September 2018, has the capacity to hold up to 280 male prisoners. On 10 March 2023, a B$3.768 million budget was announced for significant upgrades to both Maraburong and Jerudong prisons, including the installation of CCTV systems.

== Rehabilitation ==
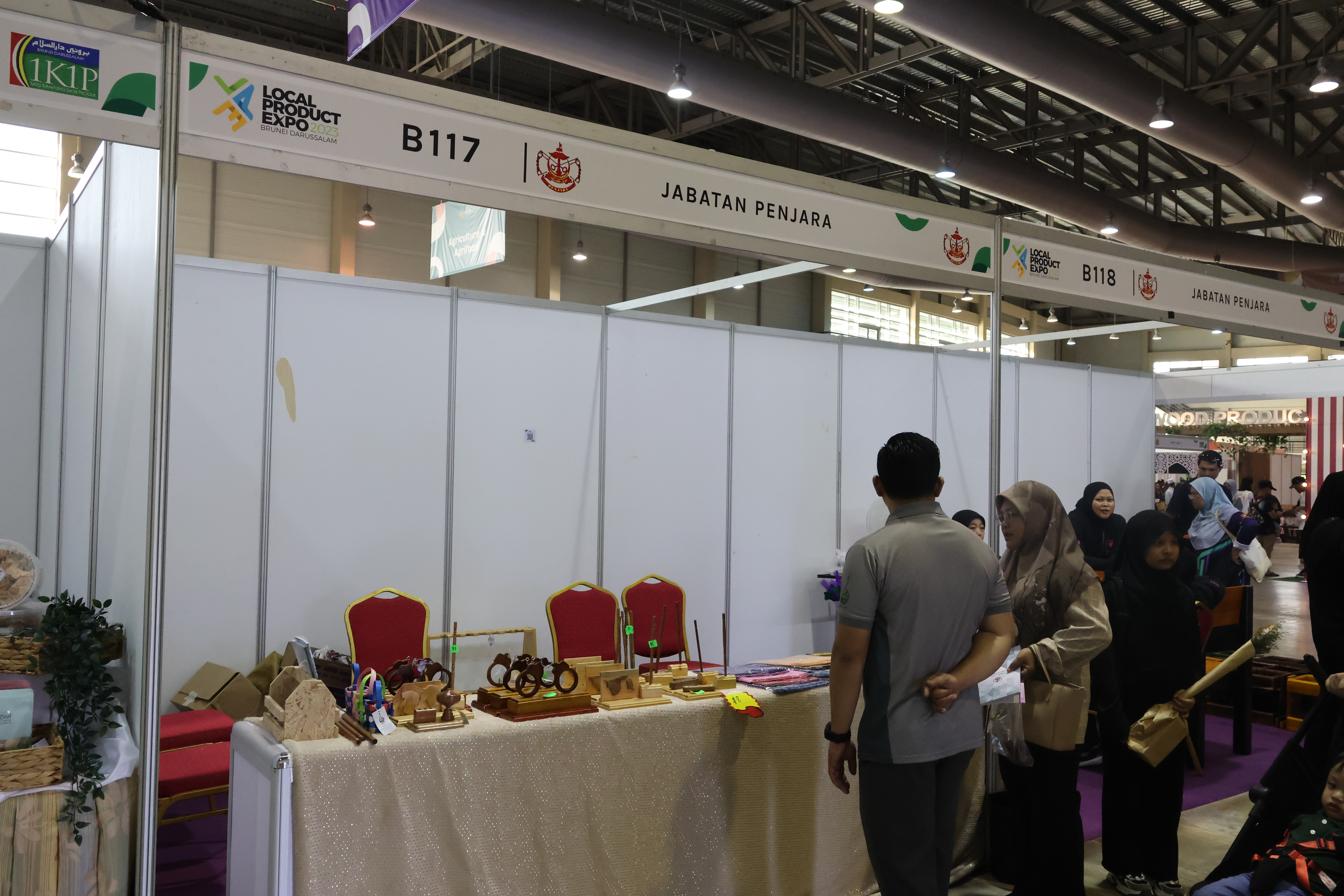
Woodwork being sold at a local product expo inside BRIDEX, 2023

The Prisons Department offers various rehabilitation programs aimed at supporting inmates' reintegration into society. These include INSAF, which allows prisoners to create and sell products, and vocational training in fields such as woodworking, farming, cooking, and landscaping. Additionally, aftercare programs collaborate with private businesses and non-governmental organizations to help ex-offenders find employment or business opportunities. These initiatives, which place a strong emphasis on family and community support, are designed to reduce recidivism by promoting independence and facilitating a successful transition back into society.

In line with these efforts, the Aftercare Support Association (AFSA) (Note: The goal of AFSA, which was founded in 2018 by the counseling and supervisory centre of the prisons department and registered in 2020, was to strengthen Rakan Seliaan members by means of initiatives including reintegration workshops, greenhouse farming, and Al-Quran memorisation.) opened a new office at the Diplomatic Enclave on 29 October 2024. Funded by Yayasan Sultan Haji Hassanal Bolkiah, AFSA also manages commercial initiatives, including food stalls and a carpentry workshop, to promote independence and social harmony. These programs support the goals of Wawasan Brunei 2035 by fostering reintegration and contributing to social peace.

== Prison officers ==
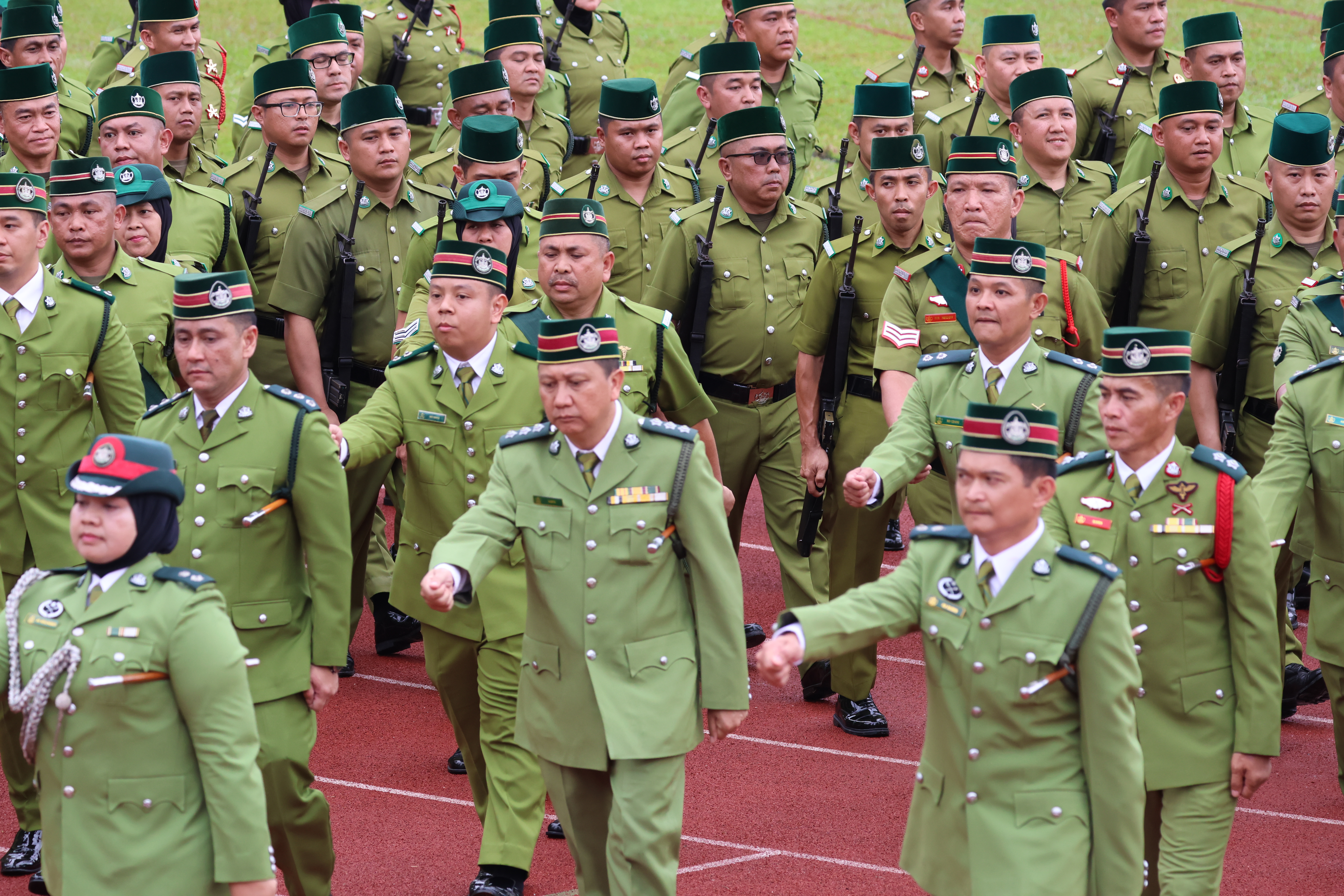
Uniformed prison officers at the 2024 National Day parade

On 30 December 1959, Pengiran Hidup bin Pengiran Hashim, a local official holding the title of superintendent of prisons, was appointed as the head of office. Abdul Wahab bin Mohd Said was the first holder when the title was changed to director of prisons on 1 January 1985.

As of 2016, about 600 employees, both uniformed and civilian, work for the Prisons Department, supporting a range of departmental duties such administration, security, counselling, and education. At least a diploma or degree is required for employment, and uniformed employees must pass departmental exams and physicals. Pre-service training, which includes both physical and specialised training in correctional services, is required of all new hires for six months. Promotions within the department are determined by performance and exams, and career advancement is separated into operational and administrative levels. Recruitment for higher levels is open to people with qualifications and expertise in rehabilitation and the criminal justice system, and senior officials are required to pass formal exams. In order to promote professional development in a variety of sectors, including criminology, counselling, and engineering, the department also provides continuing training opportunities both domestically and overseas and provides financial aid for additional education.

== Issues ==
=== Financial constraints ===
Individual and group counselling sessions are offered in Bruneian prisons; however, the efficiency of these programs is restricted by the prison department's lack of support, most likely as a result of financial limitations. Despite the obstacles presented by public stigma and discrimination, inmates aspire for acceptance from their families, therefore strengthening family ties is essential. The reintegration of ex-offenders is hampered by this unfavourable attitude, underscoring the necessity of family and community counselling to dispel prejudices and promote moral support. Held once a year for a select number of prisoners, peer mentoring groups assist them deal with criminal behaviours by emphasising skills like communication, leadership, problem-solving, and decision-making.

=== Overcrowding ===
The 2021 US Department of State's Country Reports on Human Rights Practices highlighted overcrowding in Brunei prisons, with 841 inmates exceeding the maximum capacity of 585. Through an ombudsman's office, judges, lawmakers, and community leaders paid convicts monthly visits, and a government-appointed committee of retired officials kept an eye on prison conditions and handled grievances. Programs for spiritual rehabilitation were mandatory for Muslim prisoners. Sharia prisoners were housed in the same facilities as non-Sharia prisoners, but they were kept apart and subject to the same rules. No impartial domestic or international NGO monitoring of prison conditions was reported.
