= Bahrin Abdullah =

Bruneian politician and businessperson (born 1961)

Dato Seri Setia Bahrin Abdullah PSNB DPMB PJK PIKB PKL
- بهرين عبدالله
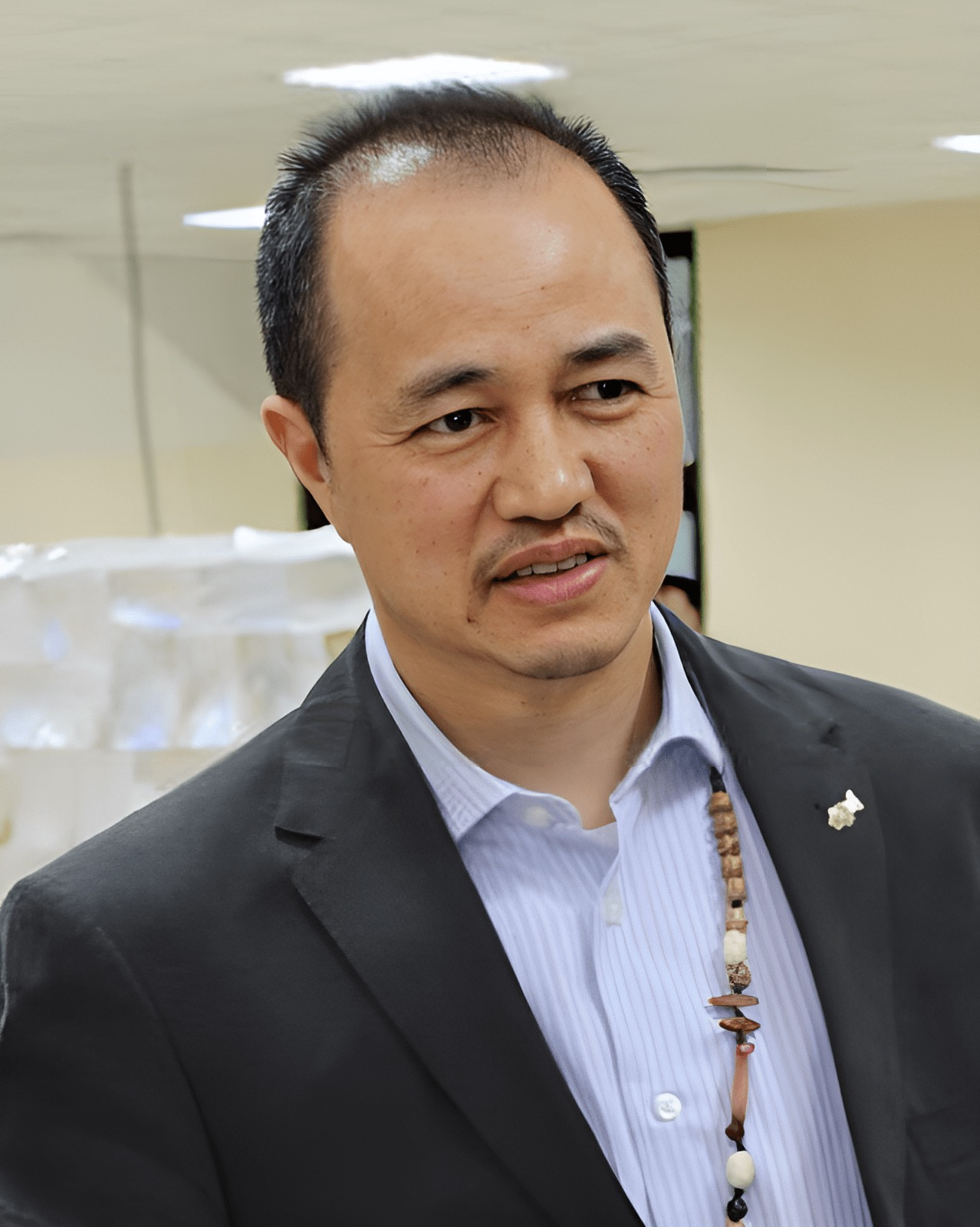
- Bahrin in 2015

6th Minister of Development
- In office 22 October 2015 – 30 January 2018
- Monarch: Hassanal Bolkiah
- Deputy: Suhaimi Gafar
- Preceded by: Suyoi Osman
- Succeeded by: Suhaimi Gafar

Deputy Minister of Finance
- In office 29 May 2010 – 22 October 2015
- Minister: Hassanal Bolkiah; Abdul Rahman Ibrahim
- Preceded by: Abdul Rahman Ibrahim
- Succeeded by: Hisham Hanifah; Amin Liew Abdullah
Other positions
Chairman of Bank Islam Brunei Darussalam
In office 2013–2018
Preceded by	Yahya Bakar
Succeeded by	Amin Liew Abdullah
Chairman of Royal Brunei Airlines
In office 2 September 2010 – 8 June 2018
Preceded by	Lim Jock Seng
Succeeded by	Amin Liew Abdullah

Personal details
- Born: 16 June 1961 (age 64) Kampong Bukit Udal, Tutong, Brunei
- Spouse: Pengiran Noorsiah
- Education: Sufri Bolkiah English School; Tun Seri Lanang High School; Queenstown Secondary Technical School
- Alma mater: Wolverhampton Polytechnic (BA); University of Strathclyde (MBA)
- Profession: Politician; businessperson

Bahrin bin Abdullah (born 16 July 1961) is a Bruneian politician and businessperson who formerly served as the sixth Minister of Development from 2015 to 2018, and the Deputy Minister of Finance from 2010 to 2015. Additionally, he was also the director of Royal Brunei Airlines (RBA) from 2 September 2010 until his resignation on 8 June 2018, the Chairman of Takaful Brunei Board of Directors, and the Chairman of Brunei Fertilizer Industries (BFI).

== Education ==
Bahrin was born on 16 July 1961 in Kampong Bukit Udal, Tutong District. He attended Sufri Bolkiah English School, Tun Seri Lanang High School, Singapore for his 'O' level and Queenstown Secondary Technical School for his 'A' level. He holds a Bachelor of Arts (Hons) in economics from Wolverhampton Polytechnic in England and a Master of Business Administration (MBA) in Strategic Management Majoring in Finance from University of Strathclyde.

== Early career ==
Bahrin began his career in June 1983, as an education officer for the Ministry of Education (Anthony Abell College); an investment officer in the Research Unit of the Investment Department Brunei Investment Agency (BIA) in November 1983; an investment officer with the Investment Department BIA's London Office in August 1988; a senior investment officer with the Investment Department BIA in July 1994; a senior investment officer with the Investment Department BIA, as well as Senior Manager and Corporate Secretary, Audley Insurance Company in September 1996; a Deputy Director General of Venture Capital and Strategic Investment Department (VSI) BIA in January 2003; an Assistant Managing Director/General Manager with the (Research and Trade Development (RBD), and Venture Capital and Strategic Investment Agency Department in May 2003; a Senior Assistant Managing Director of the Portfolio Asset Management (External Fund Management (EFM), Internal Fund Management Department (IFM) and Venture Capital and Strategic Investment Department (VCSI) BIA in April 2005; a Deputy Permanent Secretary with the Ministry of Finance in June 2006; and a permanent secretary of the Ministry of Finance in January 2008.

== Ministerial career ==
In the 2010 Bruneian cabinet reshuffle, Bahrin was appointed deputy minister of finance on 29 May.

The Sultan of Brunei, Hassanal Bolkiah consented to the appointment of the new cabinet on 22 October 2015, coincided with the announcement of Bahrin as the new Minister of Development and Dato Suhaimi as the Deputy Minister of Development effective 23 October 2015. In addition to receiving courtesy calls from several foreign ministers and ambassadors such as Masagos Zulkifli, Vladlen Semivolos and Amphay Kindavong.

On 22 March 2016, he responded to a number of problems and ideas brought up in the adjournment speeches of a number of appointed Legislative Council (LegCo) members. He believes that the collaboration and contribution of the members' serious views will continue and be improved in the future in order to improve the policies, plans, and execution needed to defend the interests of the nation. He then clarified that the issue at this point in the bid process and its scope unquestionably involves the improvement of Tutong River's status as required and suitable while responding to queries about the catchment ponds and plains of Tutong River for the purpose of flood prevention.

Bahrin praised Brunei's ongoing dedication to working with international organizations on land surveying and geomatics in his keynote address as the guest of honor at the opening ceremony of the 14th Southeast Asia Survey Congress 2017 on 15 August. On a local level, the minister said that the Survey Department of the Ministry of Development has also developed its own Survey Geoportal, giving users internet access to Brunei's geospatial data.

The cabinet reshuffle, which comes barely two years after the previous one in October 2015, was revealed by the Sultan of Brunei, in a live broadcast on 30 January 2018. Suhaimi Gafar has been elevated to succeed him.

== Personal life ==
Bahrin is married to Pengiran Datin Hajah Noorsiah binti Pengiran Hamdan.

== Honours ==
Bahrin has earned the following honours;

- Order of Setia Negara Brunei First Class (PSNB; 15 July 2016) – Dato Seri Setia
- Order of Setia Negara Brunei Fourth Class (PSB)
- Order of Seri Paduka Mahkota Brunei Second Class (DPMB; 15 July 2010) – Dato Paduka
- Meritorious Service Medal (PJK)
- Excellent Service Medal (PIKB)
- Long Service Medal (PKL)

Political offices
Preceded by Suyoi Osman	6th Minister of Development; 22 October 2015 – 30 January 2018	Succeeded by Suhaimi Gafar
Preceded by Abdul Rahman Ibrahim	Deputy Minister of Finance; 29 May 2010 – 22 October 2015	Succeeded by Hisham Hanifah; Amin Liew Abdullah
Business positions
Preceded by Yahya Bakar	Chairman of Bank Islam Brunei Darussalam; 2013–2018	Succeeded by Amin Liew Abdullah
Preceded by Lim Jock Seng	Chairman of Royal Brunei Airlines; 2 September 2010 – 8 June 2018	Succeeded by Amin Liew Abdullah
