= The Asian Banker =

Financial services company

- Company type: Private company
- Industry: research and information for the financial services industry, publishing, consulting, training, conferences
- Founded: 1996
- Founder: Emmanuel Daniel
- Headquarters: Singapore
- Area served: Global
- Key people: Emmanuel Daniel, Chairman Foo Boon Ping, President and Managing Editor
- Products: The Asian Banker Journal The Asian Banker 300 The Asian Banker Summit
- Number of employees: ~70
- Website: www.theasianbanker.com

The Asian Banker is a company that provides information for the financial services industry in the form of publications, online materials such as e-newsletters, research, and conventions, and other industry gatherings. It is regarded as one of the Asian region's leading consultancies in financial services research, benchmarking and intelligence.

== History ==
The Asian Banker was founded in Singapore in 1996 by Emmanuel Daniel.

== Publications ==
The company's original product was The Asian Banker Journal, a quarterly publication of 40 pages that was launched in January 1997. Throughout 1997 and 1998, it provided on-the-ground coverage of the 1997 Asian financial crisis, anchored by Daniel's journalistic skills and award-winning articles—Daniel won the prestigious Citibank Excellence in Journalism Award for the Asian region in February 1999 for his work in determining the impact of the Internet on banking.

The magazine covers a wide range of industry topics, such as opinion editorials, current events' analysis, retail banking, transaction banking, risk management, bank regulation and IT for financial services. It features profiles of individuals in the financial services industry, some of which can run to several pages if the individual is particularly influential. The publication is characterised by its coverage of bank CEOs and chief regulators interviews. The publications business also maintains a video interview website called The Banking Conversation. The website contains interviews, 10 to 30 minutes in length, of prominent figures in banking, economics, IT, investing and academia.

By 2005, The Asian Banker Journal was published 10 times a year. While Daniel has turned over management of the magazine to staff, he still writes for a blog.

== Forums business ==
The company launched a forums division in 2000 to capitalise on the interest its readership had in taking part in a forum to discuss banking issues and challenges that had come to the fore in the aftermath of the 1997 Asian financial crisis. It held the first Asian Banker Summit in Singapore in 2000. Subsequent summits have been held in Kuala Lumpur, Bangkok, Jakarta and Hanoi, Beijing and Singapore.

The summit typically includes fora on topics such as risk management, information technology, transaction banking, payment systems and regulation, and they include both opening, and closing, keynote speeches.

In The Asian Banker Summit 2008 in Hanoi and The Asian Banker Summit 2009 in Beijing, The Asian Banker collaborated with The Bankers' Association for Finance and Trade (BAFT) on a conference, held in conjunction with The Asian Banker Summit, called The BAFT Asia Conference on Cash, Treasury and Trade. On 27 October 2008, BAFT announced that it had renewed the agreement for the 2009 conference in Beijing.

Besides the Summit, the company holds events in other cities around Asia, and organises The Asian Banker Awards Programme.
