= Queenstown Secondary School =

Queenstown Secondary School 女皇镇中学

Location
- 1.2937°N 103.8110°E

Information
- Type: Government
- Motto: Berani Berkhidmat ('Dare to Serve' in Malay)
- Established: 1956
- School code: 3508
- Principal: Sim How Chong
- Enrolment: Approx. 1,100
- Colour: Maroon Sky Blue
- Website: www.queenstownsec.moe.edu.sg

Queenstown Secondary School (QTSS) is a co-educational government secondary school in Queenstown, Singapore and the first technical school in Singapore. QTSS was one of the 28 schools selected by the Ministry of Education to start piloting aspects of Full Subject-Based Banding (Full SBB) from 2020 onwards. This includes reorganised form classes of varying academic abilities (Express, Normal (Academic) and Normal (Technical)).

== History ==
=== Queenstown Secondary Technical School (1956–1993) ===
QSTS was established in 1956 as Queenstown Secondary Technical School. Initially, classes were held at the Jalan Eunos English School while the school building was being prepared. Three blocks made up the first school campus. In 1957, the school moved to Strathmore Road. The school's workshops were steadily supplied with equipment from government funding from 1959 and in August 1960, limited courses in Woodwork and Metalwork were started. Improvements to the building took place in 1963. A pre-university class was added in 1965, which existed until 1994. In 1966, Home Study Courses (HSC) classes were added. A new four-storey building, a hall-cum-canteen, and 4 science laboratories were opened in April 1968. The school became co-educational in 1971. In 1977, the Queenstown Secondary Technical School Alumni Association was registered, one of the first of its kind for government secondary schools. New facilities such as basketball courts have been added. In 1985, the school acquired a computer laboratory and language laboratory. Home Economics was also introduced as a subject.

=== Queenstown Secondary School (1993–present) ===
The school was renamed Queenstown Secondary School (QTSS) in January 1993. From December 1993 to June 1997, it occupied temporary premises at Commonwealth Avenue while the buildings at Strathmore Road were renovated and upgraded. In 1998, the school opened with brand new facades and architectural flourishes. The school was one of the 23 schools selected by the Ministry of Education to launch its Full Subject-Based Banding (Full SBB) where students are enrolled in mixed-form classes in 2020. In 2025, the school launched its masterplan for learning spaces, starting with the renovation of the Learning Commons @ Quest library. The school's applied learning programme is in Environmental Sustainability and has been in collaboration with corporations e.g. Swedish Chamber of Commerce Singapore to emphasize the school's sustainability education. The school's Learning for Life programme is in Community Youth Leadership and has worked with many partners e.g. NUS to serve the community.

== Identity and culture ==
=== School crest ===
The school crest consists of a shield with the school colours, sky blue and maroon. The sky blue reflects the limitless opportunities to strive for and the maroon signifies the spirit of fraternity. The open book symbolises learning and knowledge, and the wheel symbolises the technical aspect of education offered in the school.

On the tower, which denotes strength, is the lion which signifies courage and from which Singapore derives its name. Below the shield is the school motto "Berani Berkhidmat", which means "Dare To Serve" in Malay.

=== School alumni association ===
The school's alumni association traces its roots back to 1959, when it was initiated by the pioneer batch of 1959. While a preliminary association was formed as early as 1966, the Queenstown Secondary Technical School Alumni Association was officially registered with the Registrar of Society (ROS) in 1977. In 1993, it subsequently became the Queenstown Secondary School Alumni Association following the school's name change. The association is also known as the Quest Alumni Association (QAA).

=== Quests band ===
The popular Quests band name was derived from the school name as two of the members were from Queenstown Secondary Technical School.

== Notable alumni ==
- Lee Yock Suan (born 1946), a former Cabinet minister
- Bahrin Abdullah (born 1961), a Bruneian politician and businessperson
- Desmond Tan (born 1970), a current Senior Minister of State in the Prime Minister's Office
- Picasso Tan (born 1973), a retired competitive wushu taolu athlete.
