= ASEAN Academy of Engineering and Technology =

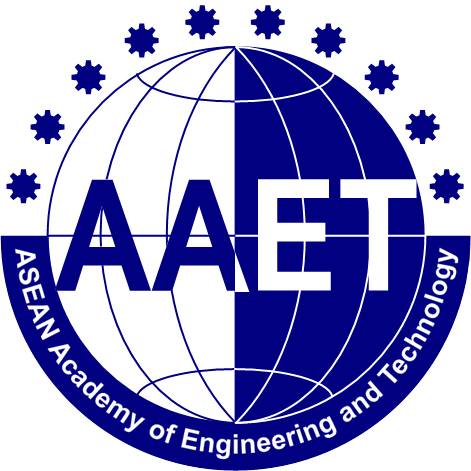
- Abbreviation: AAET
- Founded: January 1, 2004; 22 years ago
- Founder: Lee Yee Cheong
- Founded at: Institution of Engineers, Singapore
- Type: Learned society
- Registration no.: T07SS0113E
- Legal status: Nonprofit organization
- Purpose: Engineering sciences, technology
- Headquarters: Kuala Lumpur, Malaysia
- Locations: Singapore; Cambodia
- Coordinates: 3.09837°N 101.67792°E
- Origins: Singapore
- Region served: ASEAN
- Method: Conferences, round-table meetings, green award, distinguished lectures, webinars, engineering competitions, science fairs
- Members: 474 (2024)
- Official language: English
- Secretary General: Yong Ah Huat
- President: Ewe Hong Tat
- First Vice-President: Romulo R. Agatep
- Second Vice-President: Aung Kyaw Myat
- Treasurer: Chin Lee Tuck
- Key people: Chuah Hean Teik
- Affiliations: ASEAN Secretariat
- Staff: Fok Kuk Fai (2024)
- Website: www.aaet-asean.org

The ASEAN Academy of Engineering and Technology is a learned society of engineers and technologists, policy makers, the public, and the private sectors from Association of Southeast Asian Nations (ASEAN) member states. It was founded in 2004 and was registered with the ASEAN Secretariat as an accredited Civil Society Organization (CSO) on 11 July 2007.

== Fellowships ==
Fellowship of the academy is awarded to individuals from academia, research institutes, industry, and government who have demonstrated successful leadership or outstanding contributions to engineering and technology over an extended period. Fellowship of the AAET is in two categories:

=== Voting-Fellows ===
1. Distinguished Fellow;
2. Senior Fellows; and
3. Ordinary Fellows.

=== Non Voting-Fellows ===
1. Distinguished Honorary Fellows;
2. Honorary Fellows;
3. Foreign Fellows; and
4. Associate Fellows.

== Post-nominal letters ==
Each category of fellows of the ASEAN Academy of Engineering and Technology is entitled to use the respective post-nominal letters as follows:

1. D. Hon. FAAET for Distinguished Honorary Fellow
2. Hon. FAAET for Honorary Fellow
3. D. FAAET for Distinguished Fellow
4. SFAAET for Senior Fellow
5. FAAET for Ordinary Fellow
6. FAAET(F) for Foreign Fellow
7. AFAAET for Associate Fellow

== Pre-nominal letters ==
Distinguished Fellows and Senior Fellows are entitled to use the pre-nominal letters of Academician.
