= Ministry of Development (Brunei) =

Government ministry of Brunei

- Kementerian Pembangunan
- National emblem of Brunei

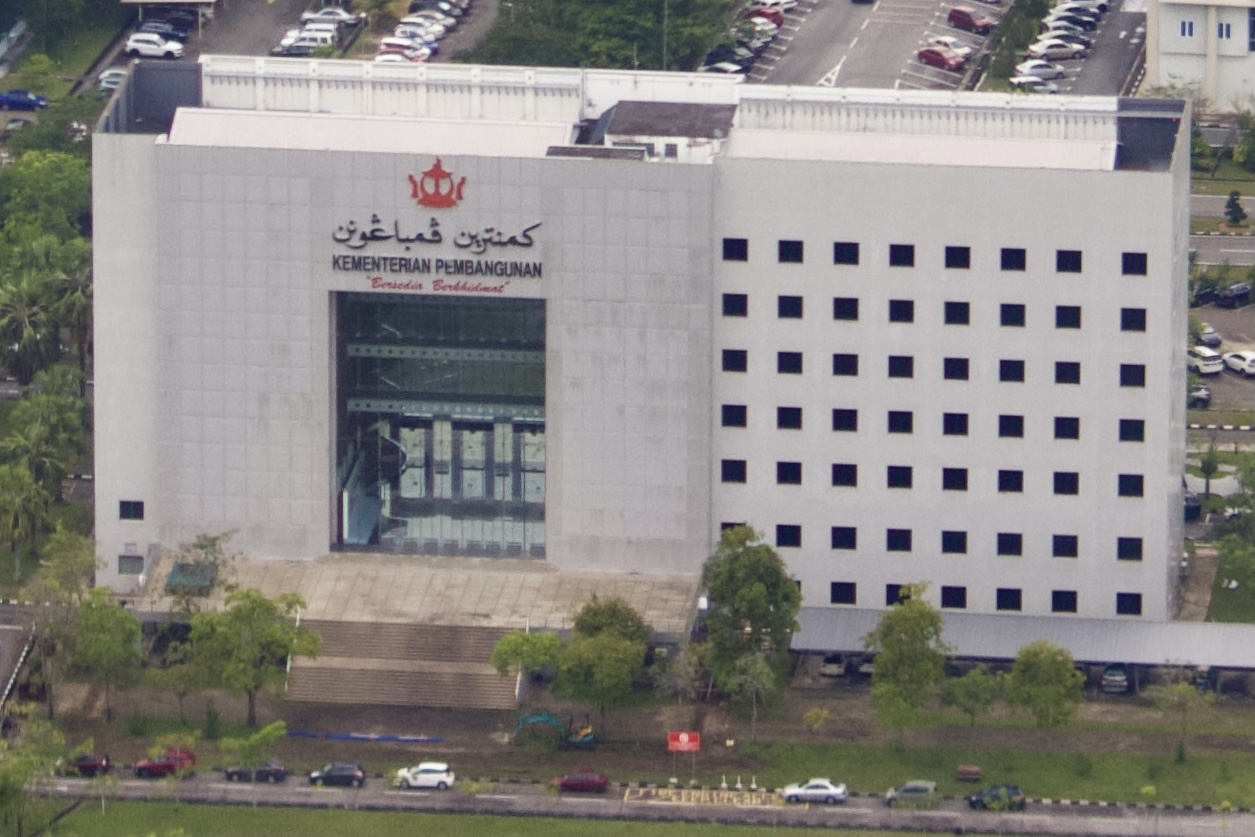
- Ministry of Development building in 2022

Ministry overview
- Formed: 1 January 1984; 41 years ago
- Jurisdiction: Government of Brunei
- Status: active
- Headquarters: Bandar Seri Begawan, Brunei; 4°55′31″N 114°55′35″E
- Employees: 3,992 (2024)
- Annual budget: ▲$335 million BND (2022)
- Minister responsible: Juanda Abdul Rashid (Note: The official Malay name upon the appointment was Dato Paduka Awang Haji Muhammad Juanda bin Haji Abd. Rashid.), Minister of Development
- Website: MoD.gov.bn

The Ministry of Development (MoD; Malay: Kementerian Pembangunan) is a cabinet-level ministry in the government of Brunei which is responsible for public works, land use, environment, public housing, and surveying in the sultanate of Brunei Darussalam. It was established immediately upon Brunei's independence from the United Kingdom (UK) on 1 January 1984; 41 years ago. It is currently led by a minister, and the incumbent is Muhammad Juanda Abd. Rashid who took office since 7 June 2022. The ministry is headquartered in Bandar Seri Begawan, Brunei Darussalam.

== Departments ==
The ministry oversees the following departments:

- Department of Environment, Parks and Recreation (Jabatan Alam Sekitar, Taman dan Rekreasi, JASTRe) — responsible for waste management, public landscaping, recreational areas, and environmental conservation and policy;
- Housing Development Department (Jabatan Kemajuan Perumahan) — manages public housing;
- Lands Department (Jabatan Tanah) — enforces land law, and administers land ownership;
- Public Works Department (Jabatan Kerja Raya, JKR) — manages public buildings, roads infrastructure, water services and sewerage;
- Survey Department (Jabatan Ukur) — oversees cadastral surveying, hydrography, administrative divisions, national boundary, and calculation of Hijri calendar;
- Department of Town and Country Planning (Jabatan Perancang Bandar dan Desa) — oversees urban planning.

== Budget ==
In the 2022–23 fiscal year, the ministry has been allocated a budget of B$335 million (Note: ≈ £200 million / €230 million / US$250 million as of January 2024.), a 50 percent increase from the previous year.

== List of ministers ==
Minister of Development
no.	portrait	minister	term start	term end	time in office	ref.
1		Abdul Rahman Taib	1 Jan 1984	20 Oct 1986	2 years, 292 days	
2		Pengiran Ismail	20 Oct 1986	28 May 2001	14 years, 220 days	
3		Ahmad Jumat	17 May 2002	24 May 2005	3 years, 7 days	
4		Abdullah Bakar	24 May 2005	29 May 2010	5 years, 5 days	
5		Suyoi Osman	29 May 2010	22 Oct 2015	5 years, 146 days	
6		Bahrin Abdullah	22 Oct 2015	30 Jan 2018	2 years, 100 days	
7		Suhaimi Gafar	30 Jan 2018	7 Jun 2022	4 years, 128 days	
8		Juanda Abdul Rashid	7 Jun 2022	incumbent	3 years, 7 days	

Deputy Minister of Development
no.	portrait	minister	term start	term end	time in office	ref.
1		Selamat Munap	20 Oct 1986	1988	1–2 years	
2		Mat Suny	24 May 2005	20 May 2010	4 years, 361 days	
3		Ali Apong	20 May 2010	18 Nov 2010	182 days	
4		Suhaimi Gafar	22 Oct 2015	30 Jan 2018	2 years, 100 days	
5		Marzuke Mohsin	10 Aug 2018	7 Jun 2022	3 years, 301 days	

== Bibliography ==
- Menon, K.U. (1987). "Brunei Darussalam in 1986: in search of the political kingdom". Southeast Asian Affairs. 1987: 85–101. JSTOR 27908570.
