= Tutong–Telisai Highway =

Highway in Brunei

Coordinates: 4.7911778°N 114.6449143°E

Tutong–Telisai Highway Lebuhraya Tutong–Telisai

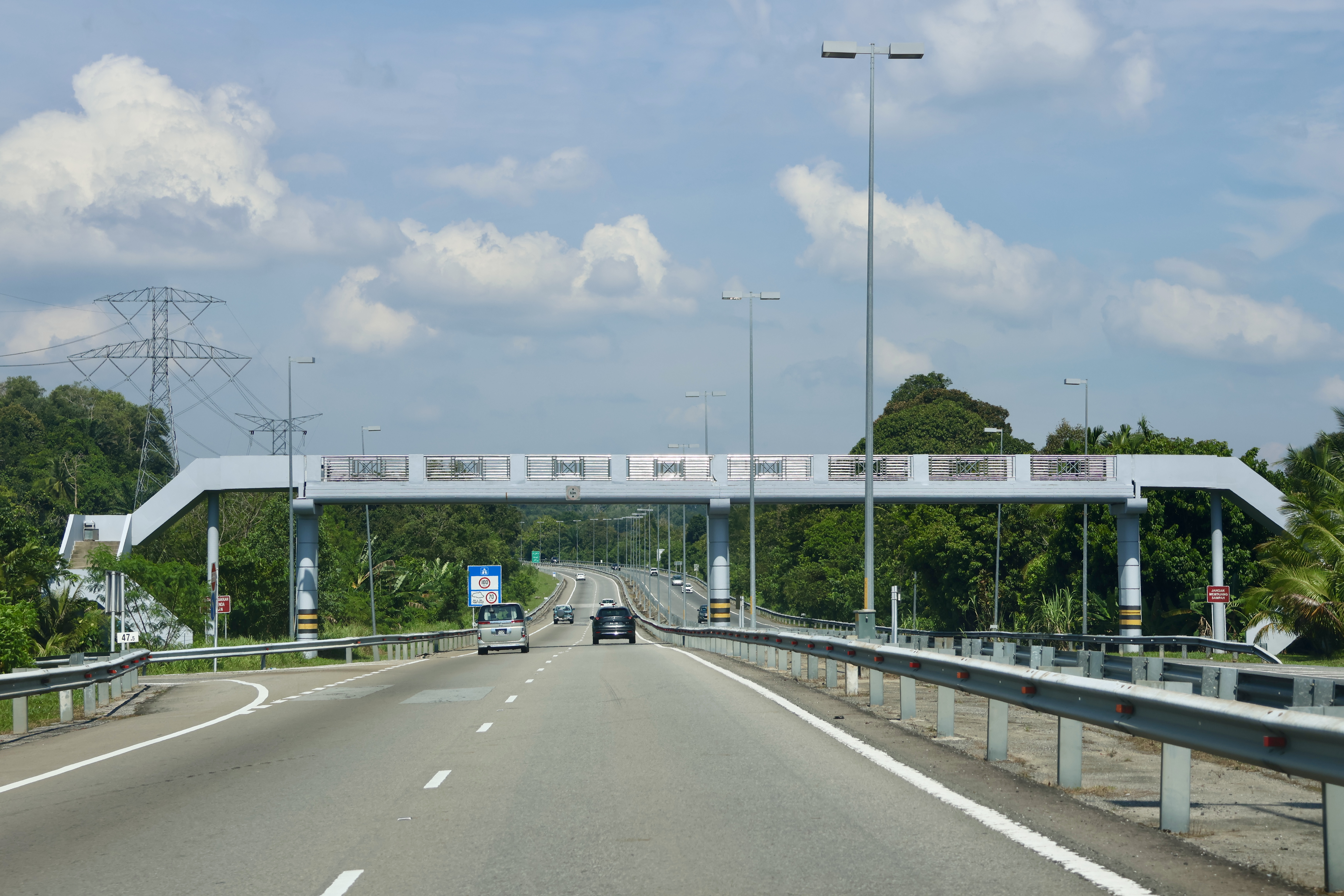

Route information
- Part of AH150
- Maintained by Public Works Department

Major junctions
- From: Sengkarai, Pekan Tutong
- To: Telisai

Location
- Country: Brunei
- Districts: Tutong
- Villages: Sengkarai, Serambangun, Bukit Udal, Bukit Beruang

Highway system
- Brunei National Roads System

Tutong–Telisai Highway (Malay: Lebuhraya Tutong–Telisai) is a major highway in Tutong District, Brunei.
