= Juanda Abdul Rashid =

Bruneian politician (born 1965)

Yang Berhormat Dato Seri Setia Juanda Abdul Rashid PSNB DPMB
- جواندا عبد الرشيد
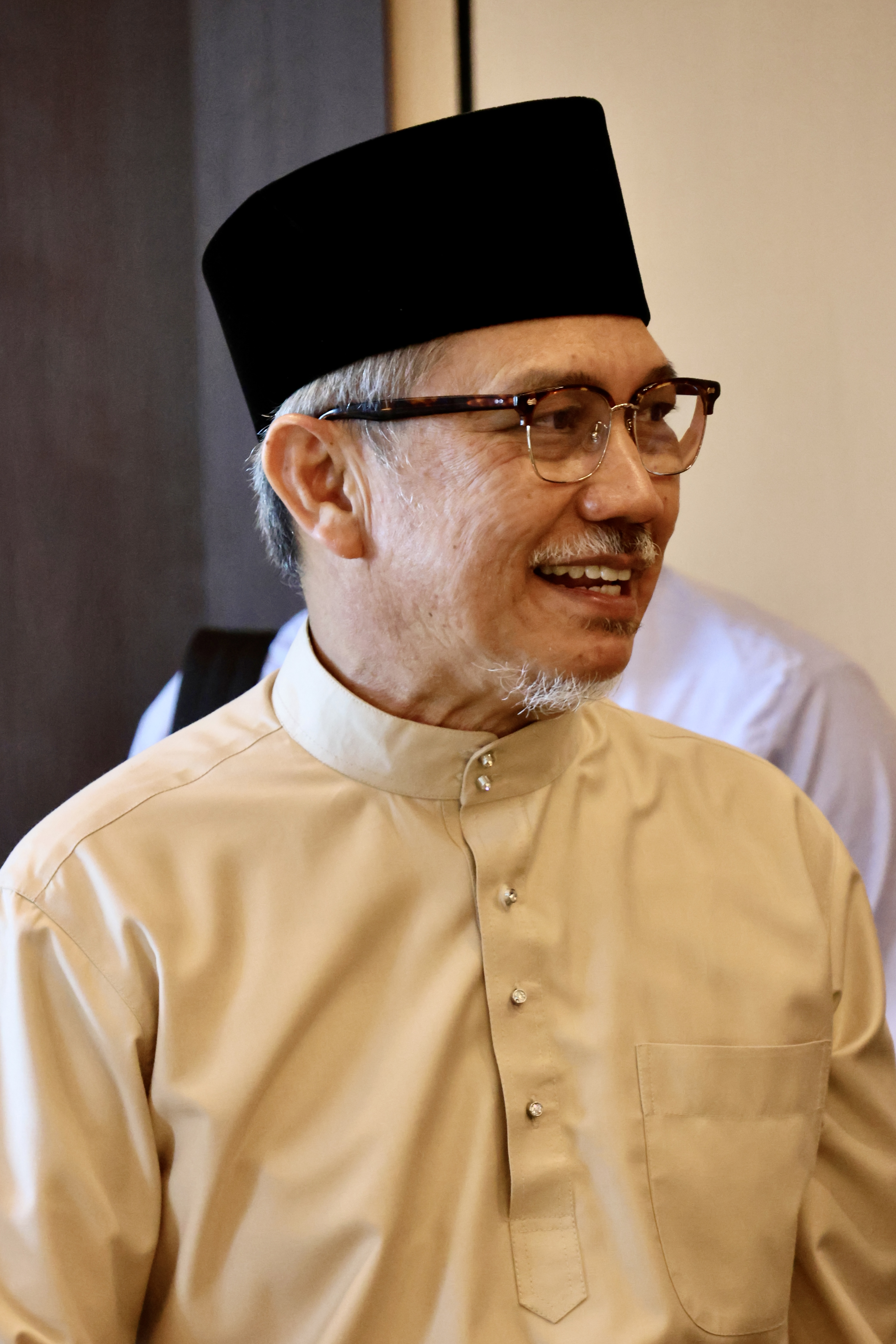
- Minister Juanda in 2024

8th Minister of Development
- Incumbent
- Assumed office 7 June 2022
- Monarch: Hassanal Bolkiah
- Preceded by: Suhaimi Gafar

Chairman of Royal Brunei Airlines
- Incumbent
- Assumed office 18 January 2023
- Deputy: Riza Yunos
- Preceded by: Abdul Manaf Metussin

Personal details
- Born: September 1965 (age 60) Brunei
- Profession: Politician; civil servant

Muhammad Juanda bin Haji Abdul Rashid (born September 1965) is a Bruneian politician and civil servant became the current Minister of Development since 2022. Additionally, he is a member of the supervisory council of Darussalam Assets (DA), advisory board of Balai Khazanah Islam Sultan Haji Hassanal Bolkiah (BKISHHB), council deputy chairman of University of Technology Brunei (UTB) and chairman of the board of directors of the Royal Brunei Airlines (RBA) since 18 January 2023.

== Political career ==
Prior to his ministerial appointment, Dato Juanda was the permanent secretary (Law and Welfare) at the Prime Minister's Office, co-currently the Director of Anti-Corruption Bureau (ACB). He was also the solicitor general at the Attorney General's Chambers (AGC) in c. 2017.

Following a cabinet reshuffle on 7 June 2022, Juanda was appointed as the Minister of Development. The Chinese Ambassador contacted the recently appointed Minister on 27 June 2022, to wish him well in his new role, to express gratitude for the Ministry's support of Chinese businesses in Brunei. Grace Fu and Dato Juanda co-chaired the 16th Brunei-Singapore Annual Exchange of Visits (BSAEV), which aimed to review bilateral cooperation under the Memorandum of Understanding on Bilateral Partnership in Environment Affairs and Climate Change in areas such as waste management, water resource management, and air quality management, as well as to exchange opinions on regional and global developments in climate change and environmental protection.

Dato Juanda stated that 184 persons had fallen behind on their rent payments, while 6,098 people had defaulted on housing loans during a 2023 Legislative Council meeting. Additionally, he stated that the department would only take legal action as a last resort against people who refuse to make payments even if they have the capacity to do so and that the agency attempts to negotiate a resolution with defaulters.

In March 2024, Dato Juanda and Guangxi Housing and Urban-Rural Development Department (HURD) of China had a working visit by a six-member team for a bilateral conversation.

== Honours ==
- Order of Setia Negara Brunei First Class (PSNB; 15 July 2022) – Dato Seri Setia
- Order of Seri Paduka Mahkota Brunei Second Class (DPMB; 15 September 2013) – Dato Paduka

Political offices
Preceded by Suhaimi Gafar	8th Minister of Development; 7 June 2022 – present	Incumbent
Business positions
Preceded by Abdul Manaf Metussin	Chairman of Royal Brunei Airlines; 18 January 2023 – present	Incumbent
