= Public Works Department (Brunei) =

Brunei postal department

- Jabatan Kerja Raya جابتن كرجا راي
- Public Works Department's logo

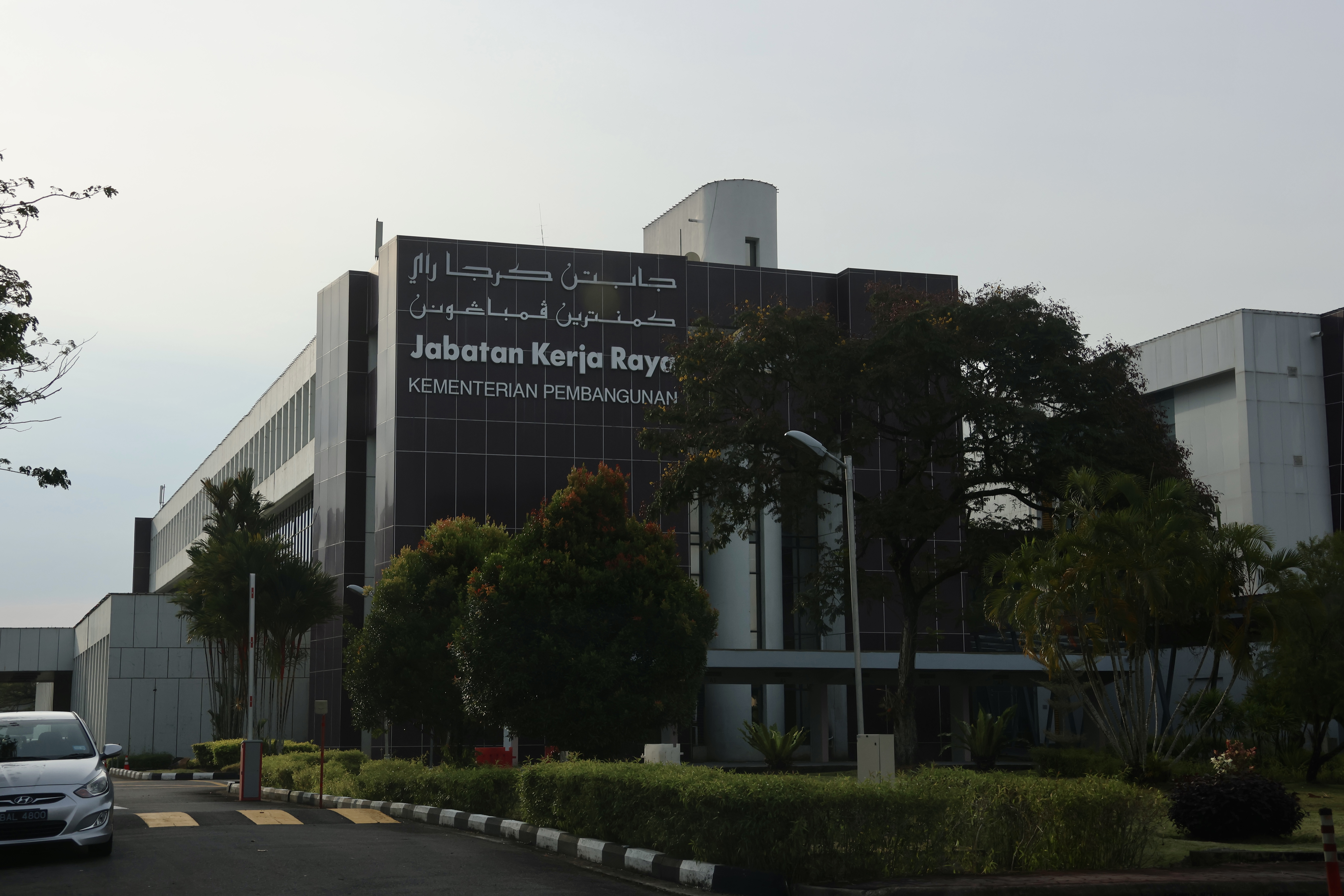
- Headquarters in 2023

Agency overview
- Formed: 1906; 120 years ago
- Jurisdiction: Government of Brunei
- Headquarters: Public Works Department, Ministry of Development, Jalan Lapangan Terbang Lama, Berakas, Bandar Seri Begawan BB3510, Brunei; 4°55′30″N 114°55′47″E
- Minister responsible: Juanda Abdul Rashid, Minister of Development
- Agency executive: Salleh Abdul Karim (Acting), Director General
- Parent agency: Ministry of Development
- Website: www.mod.gov.bn

The Public Works Department (PWD), natively known as Jabatan Kerja Raya (JKR; Jawi: جابتن كرجا راي), is a government department under the Ministry of Development (MoD) responsible for the development and maintenance of infrastructures in Brunei.

== Goals and objectives ==
In order to improve quality of life, the PWD plans to create a "Built Environment of Distinction" through the development of buildings, services, and infrastructure. By utilising its technical capabilities to build infrastructure and offer project management services for sustainable socioeconomic development, PWD plays a critical role in accomplishing the national goals of Wawasan Brunei 2035.

== History ==
The PWD was founded in 1906 with Dato Edmund Roberts as its first Director. It was backed by a Deputy Director and five Assistant Directors who were in charge of development, buildings, roads, water, and administration and finance. The agency, tasked with enhancing the country's quickly expanding infrastructure requirements, marked a noteworthy achievement in 1966 when Dato Seri Paduka Haji Talib bin Darwish was appointed as the first local director. The appointment of a Director General and Deputy Director General, together with the promotion of previous Assistant Directors to Directors for each of the five departments, was another significant turning point in its history.

By adding two more Directors to its ranks for drainage, and sewerage and technical services, the department grew even more. On 2 January 2006, JKR celebrated its 100th anniversary, making it the oldest technical department in Brunei. The PWD has been essential to the physical growth of the nation since 1966. It was formally named the 'Public Works Department' in the 1967 annual report and was able to start developing and establishing infrastructure thanks to budgetary allocations from the British Government based in Malaysia.

The 'Engineer's Office,' which PWD constructed in 1966, is the company's first office. In addition to erecting the roads and Bubungan Dua Belas, one of its first tasks was clearing the land for Brunei Town in the same year. Robert headed a team of British engineers in this task. PWD has contributed significantly to Brunei's physical growth over the course of a century, as seen by the standards of the infrastructure it has built, including roads, highways, drainage and sewage systems, water supply and conservation, and a variety of public and government buildings.

== Departments ==
There are 8 departments under JKR, which are under the Director General (DG), also known as Ketua Pengarah; and Deputy Director General (DDG), also known as Timbalan Ketua Pengarah:

=== Department of Roads ===
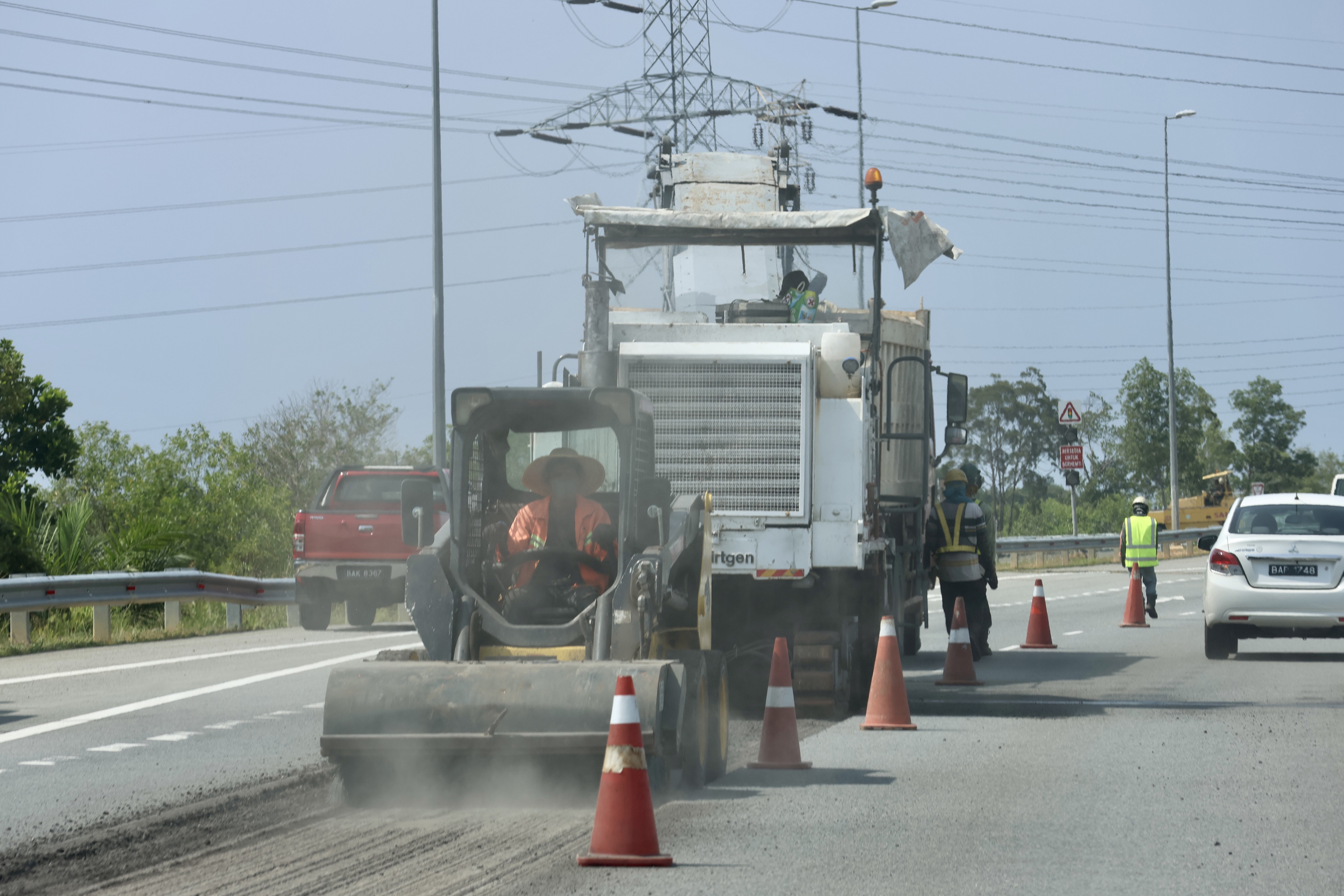
Road repair being carried out on the Tutong–Telisai Highway in 2023

The planning, building, and administration of the country's road network are within the purview of the Department of Roads (Jabatan Jalan Raya) which is composed of the Road Construction Section (SRC) and the Road Management Road Maintenance (SRM). To improve access and traffic flow around the nation, the PWD has built 30 roundabouts, 95 traffic signals, and 27 overpasses. The Road Maintenance Section (SRM) is responsible for maintaining infrastructure, such as roads, bridges, roadside drains, and traffic lights, once the Road Construction Section (SRC) has finished projects. SRM is in charge of planned management, zone management, road safety management, traffic engineering and management, bridge management, highway management, and road inspection enforcement and safety. It established the Highway Management Unit (HMU) in 2012 and the Zone Management Unit (ZMU) in 2011, in addition to the Road Inspection Division Enforcement.

=== Department of Water Services ===
PWD supplies 99.9% of the drinkable water, with 0.2% coming from rural sources. With an emphasis on resource protection and conservation, the Department of Water Services (Jabatan Perkhidmatan Air) is in charge of planning, designing, and managing the nation's water resources to guarantee sustainability and satisfy future demands. The public can request water tanker services by calling the Talian Darussalam Hotline at 123 in the event of a water disruption. The department also promotes prudent water use to avoid waste and commemorates World Water Day on March 22 every year to inform and reaffirm the significance of water conservation to the general population.

=== Department of Drainage and Sewerage ===
In order to lessen floods and safeguard coastal areas, the Department of Drainage and Sewerage (DDS; Jabatan Saliran dan Pembetungan) is in charge of all drainage infrastructure, including planning, designing, maintaining, and building it. Flood-prone areas in Brunei–Muara District were effectively reduced by DDS from 63 square kilometres (24 sq mi) to 29.3 square kilometres (11.3 sq mi) between 1997 and 2008; ongoing flood alleviation efforts are included in the National Development Plan (RKN).

=== Department of Mechanical & Electrical ===
The Department of Mechanical & Electrical (DME; Jabatan Mekanikal & Elektrikal) is divided into two sections: the Mechanical Section, which provides maintenance for government vehicles and heavy equipment, technical evaluations and inspection reports, and driving lessons for government staff, and the Building Services Section, which deals with mechanical and electrical installations, maintenance of buildings and VIP residences, trade testing, product evaluation, and preparations for national events.

=== Department of Building Services ===
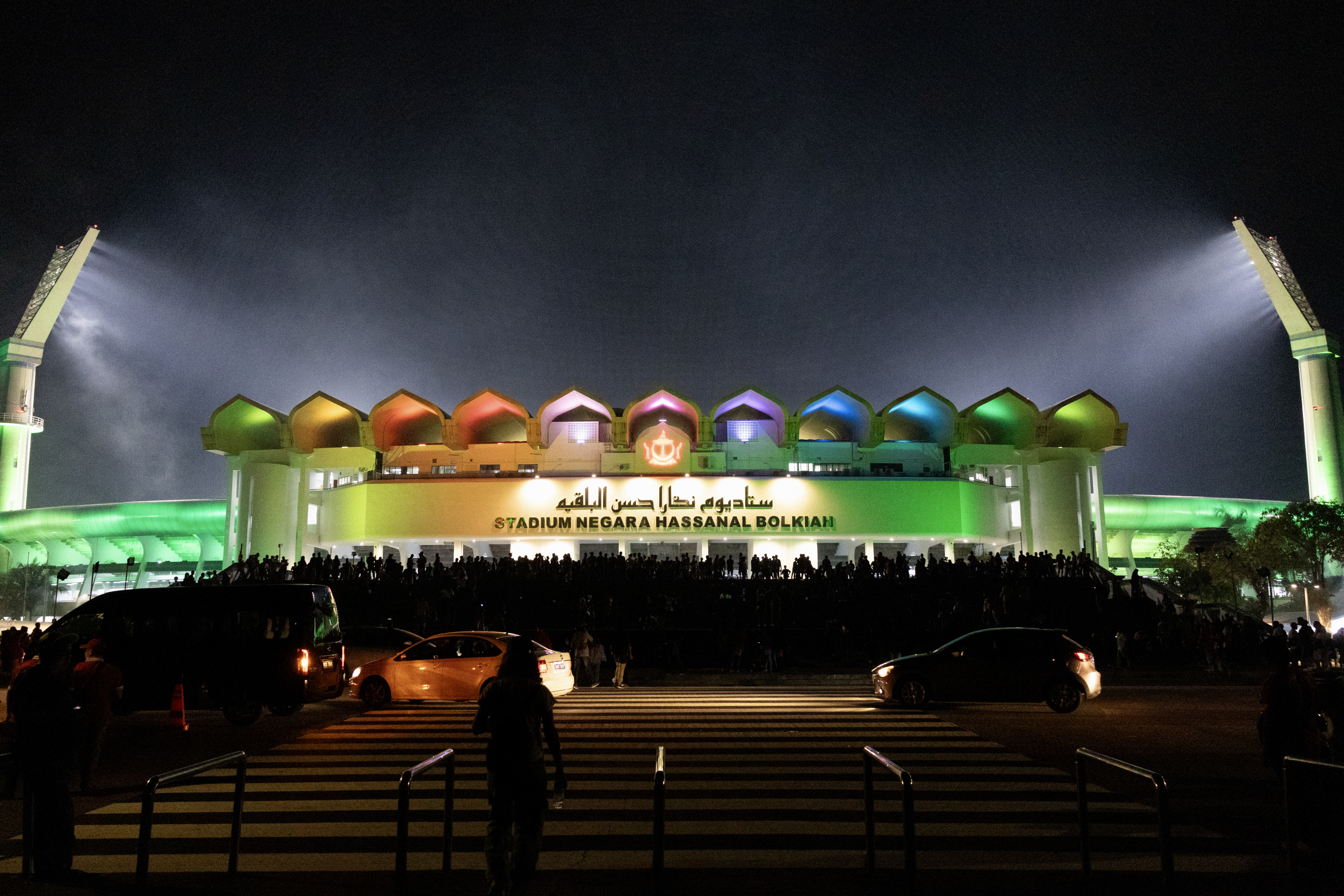
Hassanal Bolkiah National Stadium being lit up at night during the 2026 FIFA World Cup qualification (AFC)

Through its Building Services Department (DBS; Jabatan Perkhidmatan Bangunan), the PWD oversees the administration of finished buildings in addition to planning, designing, and constructing them. DBS is in charge of managing basic furnishings, demolishing abandoned buildings, assisting national events, restoring, refurbishing, and renovating government buildings, public infrastructure, and rented homes. To handle particular maintenance duties and guarantee effective management of government building assets, DBS uses an Integrated Maintenance Management System with many modules.

=== Department of Development ===
PWD divides projects into five primary stages with clearly defined milestones and employs a Project Management Manual to guide project implementation from Pre-Design to Post-Completion. The Department of Development (DOD; Jabatan Kemajuan) projects, which include client projects and landless housing projects, are financed by the NDP, with consulting services sometimes selected through ministries. From design to construction, the process consists of several steps, including certification for practical completion and fault correction, final account approvals, and the transfer of maintenance obligation to the customer following the defect liability term.

=== Other departments ===
1. Department of Administration and Finance (DAF) (Jabatan Pentadbiran dan Kewangan)
2. Department of Technical Services (DTS) (Jabatan Khidmat Teknikal)
