= Pengiran Abidin =

Bruneian airman and military officer

Major General (Retired) Dato Paduka Seri Pengiran Abidin DPKT PSPNB DSLJ DPMB SNB PHBS PIKB
- ڤڠيرن عابدين
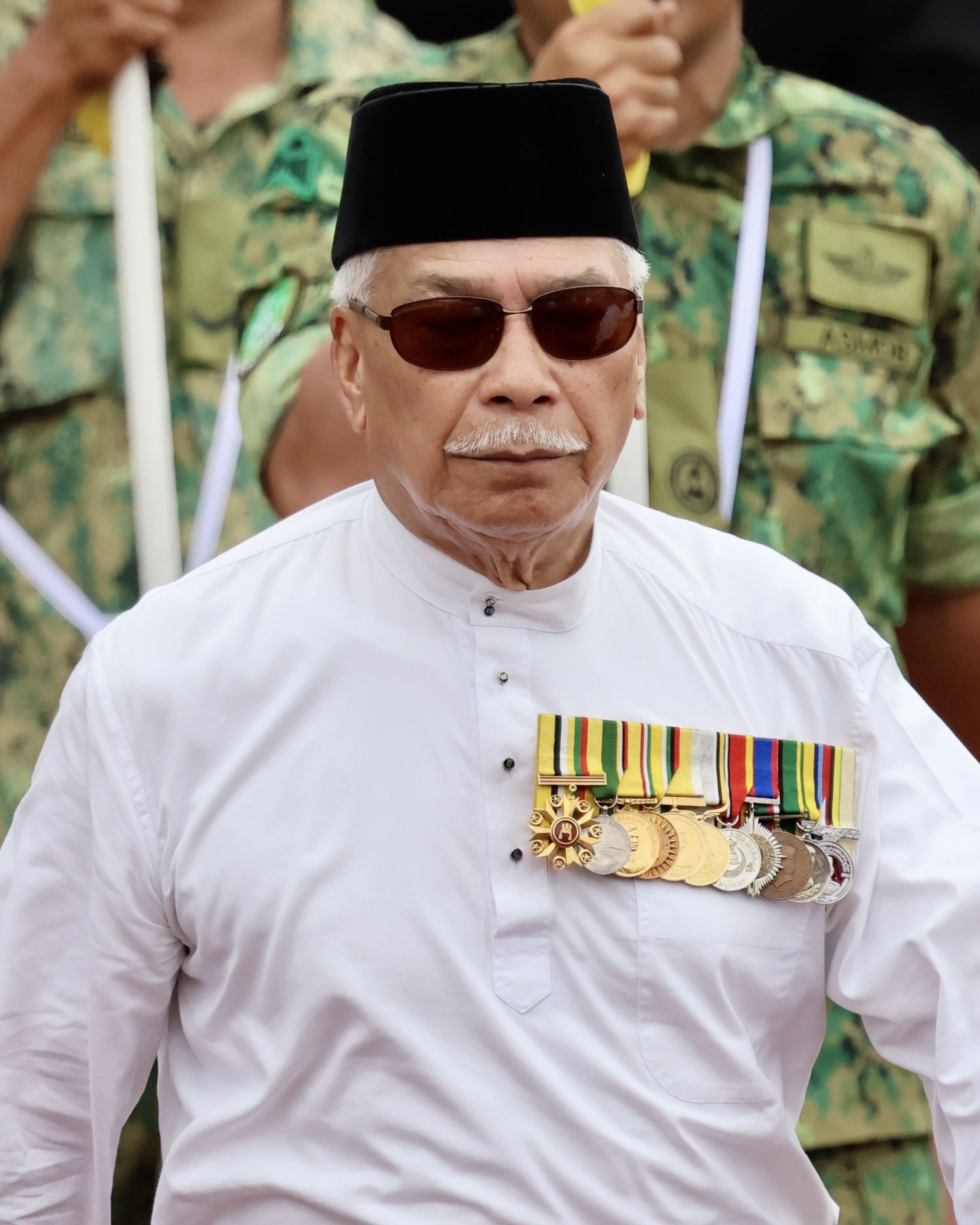
- Pengiran Abidin in 2024

4th Commander of the Royal Brunei Armed Forces
- In office 30 September 1997 – 3 July 1999
- Monarch: Hassanal Bolkiah
- Preceded by: Husin Ahmad
- Succeeded by: Shari Ahmad

1st Commander of the Royal Brunei Air Force
- In office June 1993 – 1997
- Preceded by: Office established
- Succeeded by: Ibrahim Mohammad

Commander of the Air Wing, Royal Brunei Malay Regiment
- In office 1982 – 1986
- Preceded by: John Cheshire
- Succeeded by: Jocklin Kongpaw

Personal details
- Born: Awangku Abidin bin Pengiran Ahmad Brunei
- Education: Mons Officer Cadet School
- Occupation: Military officer

Military service
- Allegiance: Brunei
- Branch/service: Royal Brunei Air Force
- Years of service: 1965–1999
- Rank: Major General
- Commands: Air Wing RBMR

Pengiran Abidin bin Pengiran Ahmad is a Bruneian airman and military officer who served as the fourth Commander of the Royal Brunei Armed Forces (RBAF) from 1997 until 1999.

As one of the first pilots in the Royal Brunei Air Force (RBAirF), him and Jocklin Kongpaw have indirectly contributed to the growth and advancement of RBAirF.

== Military career ==
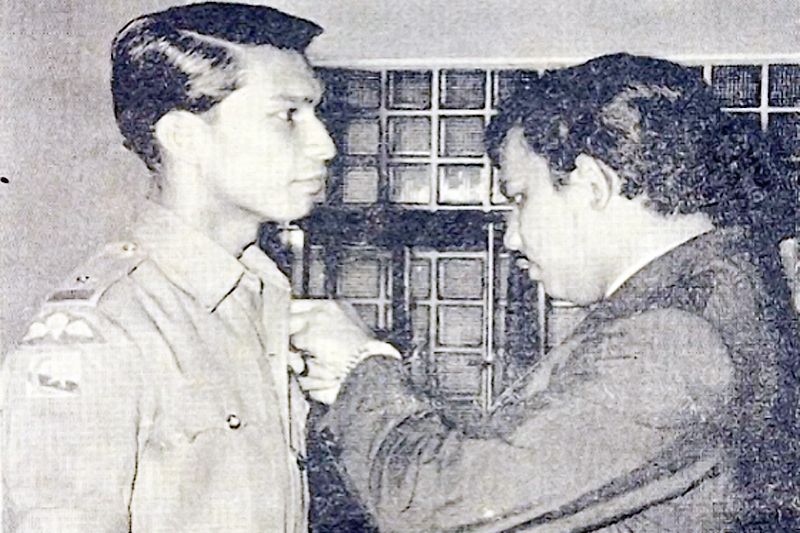
Awangku Abidin being presented his aviator badge by Sultan Hassanal Bolkiah in 1968

On 11 September 1966, Junior Lieutenants Abidin and Jocklin returned to Brunei Darussalam, after undergoing a two month Royal Air Force (RAF) Air Crew Selection course at RAF Biggin Hill, Westerham. Later on 6 August 1968, the Royal Brunei Malay Regiment (RBMR) experienced a very significant moment when Sultan Hassanal Bolkiah was pleased to present the Pilot Badge for the first time to two local officers, Second lieutenants Abidin and Jocklin, after completing all domestic and foreign flight training. For the AMDB, this ceremony has also gone down in history as the first time that two local military pilots were successfully produced. At that time, a flight display employing a Bell 206B helicopter at Istana Darul Hana further enhanced the presenting ceremony. The two local pilots demonstrated a very high degree of proficiency and efficiency.

When the two pilots were dispatched to British Executive Air Services Limited at Kidlington, Oxfordshire in the United Kingdom, for basic flight training on 14 August 1967, RBAirF made history. The two officers also undertook flying school in Sabah, Malaysia, to earn a pilot's licence prior to attending training in the United Kingdom. Following basic training, Major Herbert Marshall, commanding officer of the Helicopter Platoon, RBMR, oversaw the two pilots as they conducted 90 hours of Advanced Flight Training in a Bell 206B helicopter. Abidin Ahmad and Jocklin Kongpaw have both served as officers, and have flown a variety of Royal Brunei Air Force (TUDB) aircraft in a variety of positions.

In 1982, Lieutenant Colonel Abidin also became the first local officer to be appointed as the first commanding officer of the Air Wing, RBMR; later handing over the reins of leadership to Lieutenant Colonel Jocklin Kongpaw in 1986. In June 1993, he was appointed as the commander of the newly recognised RBAirF. He was also the first RBAirF officer to be promoted to Major General in 1997, and subsequently appointed as the fourth Commander of the Royal Brunei Armed Forces (RBAF). He attended the Asia-Pacific Defense Forum in early 1999.

== Later life ==
At the 2019 Seri Angkasa Cup, which was hosted at the RBA Golf Club, the retired members of 'The Legend' team from the RBAirF under the leadership of Abidin Ahmad successfully defended their title. An iftar celebration with former RBAirF commanders was organised on 2 May 2021, at Rumah Wira Angkasa in Berakas in honour of the blessed month of Ramadan.

== Honours ==
A road within the Royal Brunei Air Force Base, Rimba was named Abidin Boulevard on 22 April 2022. Examples of local and foreign honours awarded to him;

=== National ===
- Order of Paduka Keberanian Laila Terbilang First Class (DPKT) – Dato Paduka Seri
- Order of Pahlawan Negara Brunei First Class (PSPNB) – Dato Seri Pahlawan
- Order of Paduka Seri Laila Jasa Second Class (DSLJ) – Dato Seri Laila Jasa
- Order of Seri Paduka Mahkota Brunei Second Class (DPMB) – Dato Paduka
- Order of Setia Negara Brunei Third Class (SNB)
- Sultan Hassanal Bolkiah Medal (PHBS; 7 August 1968)
- Excellent Service Medal (PIKB)
- Sultan of Brunei Silver Jubilee Medal (5 October 1992)
- Royal Brunei Armed Forces Silver Jubilee Medal (31 May 1986)
- Royal Brunei Armed Forces Diamond Jubilee Medal (31 May 2021)
- General Service Medal
- Long Service Medal and Good Conduct (PKLPB)
- Proclamation of Independence Medal (1997)
- Inauguration Medal (1965)

=== Foreign ===
- Indonesia:
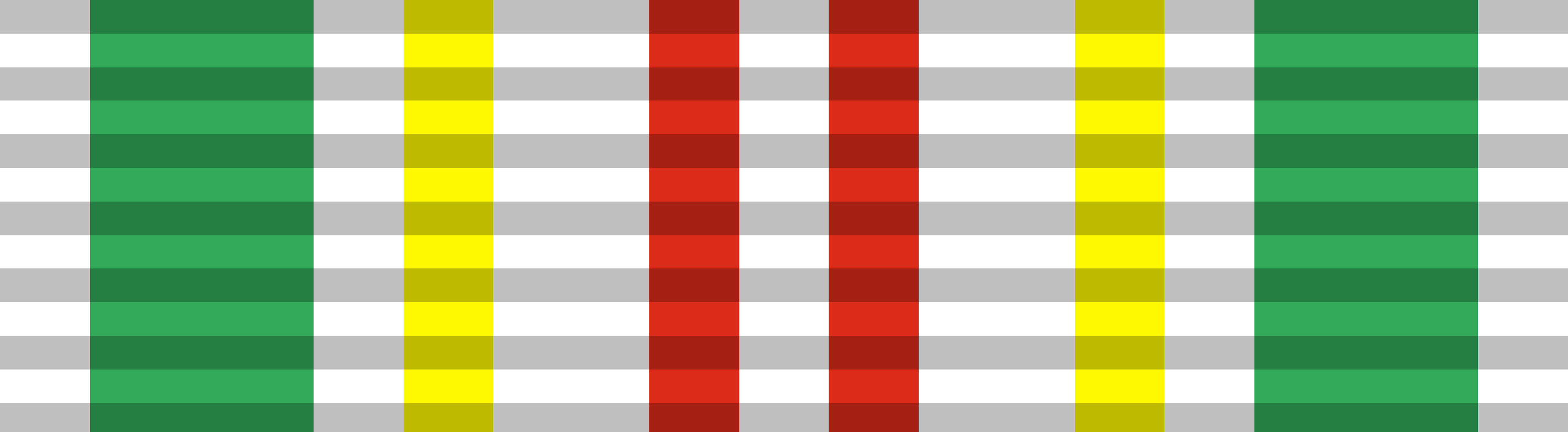
  - Bintang Yudha Dharma Utama (BYD)
- Singapore:
  - Pingat Jasa Gemilang (Tentera) (PJG; 4 May 1995)
  - Darjah Utama Bakti Cemerlang (Tentera) (DUBC; 2 February 1999)

Military offices
Preceded by John Cheshire	Commander of the Air Wing, Royal Brunei Malay Regiment; 1982 – 1986	Succeeded by Jocklin Kongpaw
Preceded by Office established	1st Commander of the Royal Brunei Air Force; June 1993 – 1997	Succeeded by Ibrahim Mohammad
Preceded by Husin Ahmad	4th Commander of the Royal Brunei Armed Forces; 30 September 1997 – 3 July 1999	Succeeded by Shari Ahmad
