= Pengiran Abdul Momin (born 1923) =

Bruneian diplomat and politician (1923–2006)

Yang Amat Mulia Pengiran Setia Jaya Pengiran Abdul Momin DK DSNB SLJ CVO POAS PHBS PJK PKL
- ڤڠيرن عبدالمومين
- Official portrait

Member of Legislative Council
- In office 6 September 2004 – 31 August 2005

Ambassador of Brunei to Indonesia
- In office 1993–2001
- Preceded by: Badaruddin Othman
- Succeeded by: Husin Ahmad

Personal details
- Born: 9 March 1923 Kampong Bakut Cina, Kampong Ayer, Brunei
- Died: 9 March 2006 (aged 83) Brunei
- Spouse: Masurai Mohammad
- Education: Sultan Idris Training College
- Occupation: Diplomat; politician; teacher

Pengiran Abdul Momin bin Pengiran Othman (Note: The alternate spelling of his given name is "Pengiran Abdul Mumin" rather than "Pengiran Abdul Momin.") (9 March 1923 – 9 March 2006) was a diplomat, educator, and noble politician renowned for his distinguished career, which included serving as the confidential clerk to Sultan Omar Ali Saifuddien III in 1961, private and confidential secretary to Sultan Hassanal Bolkiah from 1968 to 1992, and ambassador of Brunei to Indonesia from 1993 to 2001. He also served as a member of the Legislative Council (LegCo) from 2004 to 2005.

Serving Brunei throughout his life, Pengiran Abdul Momin made contributions to advancements in education and religion. He was honoured to lead the event while carrying the Al-Quran and was instrumental in the historic move of Kajang Mosque to Omar Ali Saifuddien Mosque. Before formal religious schools were established in 1956, he was one of the first to push for the inclusion of Islamic education in both Malay and English schools.

== Early life and education ==
Pengiran Abdul Momin bin Pengiran Othman was born on 9 March 1923 in Kampong Bakut Cina, a village within Kampong Ayer. As a student teacher in 1939, he began his professional life. He served as a trainee teacher at Jalan Pemancha Malay School in Brunei Town, now known as Bandar Seri Begawan, from 1934 to 1939. He enrolled as a student at the Sultan Idris Training College (SITC) in Tanjong Malim from October to December 1941, but was forced to leave to his country with the outbreak of the Second World War. He returned to the SITC in September 1946 and completed in January 1948.

== Career ==
Pengiran Abdul Momin began his career as a teacher trainee at Brunei Town Malay School in 1940 and at Labu Estate School in Temburong in 1941. He then served as an assistant teacher at Temburong Malay School in 1945 and at Sultan Omar Ali Saifuddien Malay School in Muara in 1949. By 1952, he had advanced to the position of assistant head teacher, grade II, and in 1956, he became an acting school inspector. He was renowned for being one of the thinkers who recommended that Islamic religious instruction be provided in Malay and English schools throughout the country prior to the establishment of Islamic religious schools on a systematic basis in 1956.

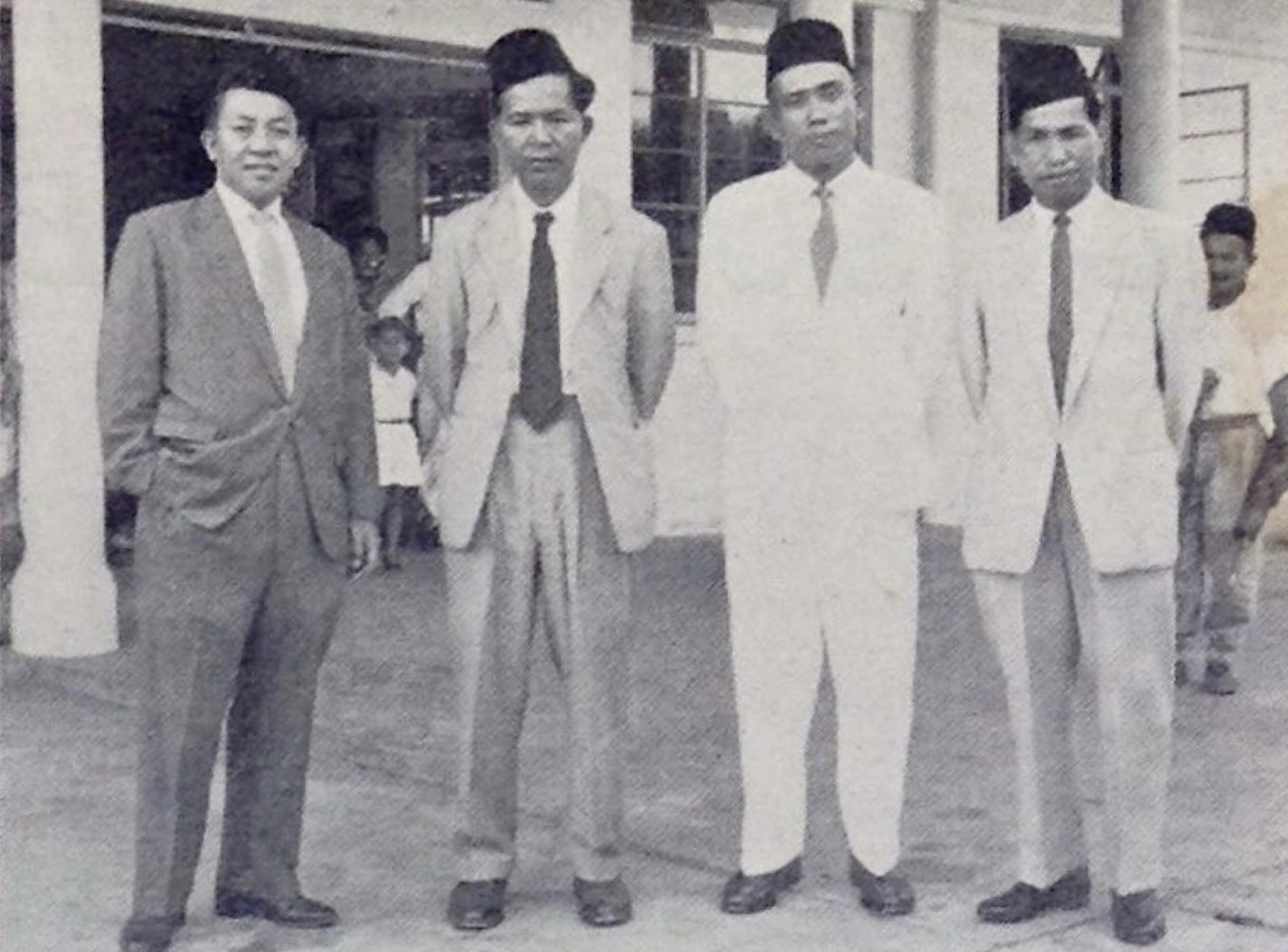
Pengiran Anak Kemaluddin (first from the left) and Pengiran Abdul Momin (first from the right) at the Brunei Airport on 5 March 1961

In 1959, he was appointed as a school inspector for Brunei Town Malay School and later elected as a member of the Chinese School Board of Inspectors. In 1961, he was promoted to the role of schools supervisor. He also served on the scholarship committee, which enabled him to select students for Madrasah Aljunied Al-Islamiah in Singapore and Brunei’s Government English Schools. Along with two others, Pengiran Abdul Momin travelled to Kuala Lumpur on 5 March 1961 to represent Brunei in an International Quran Recital Competition.

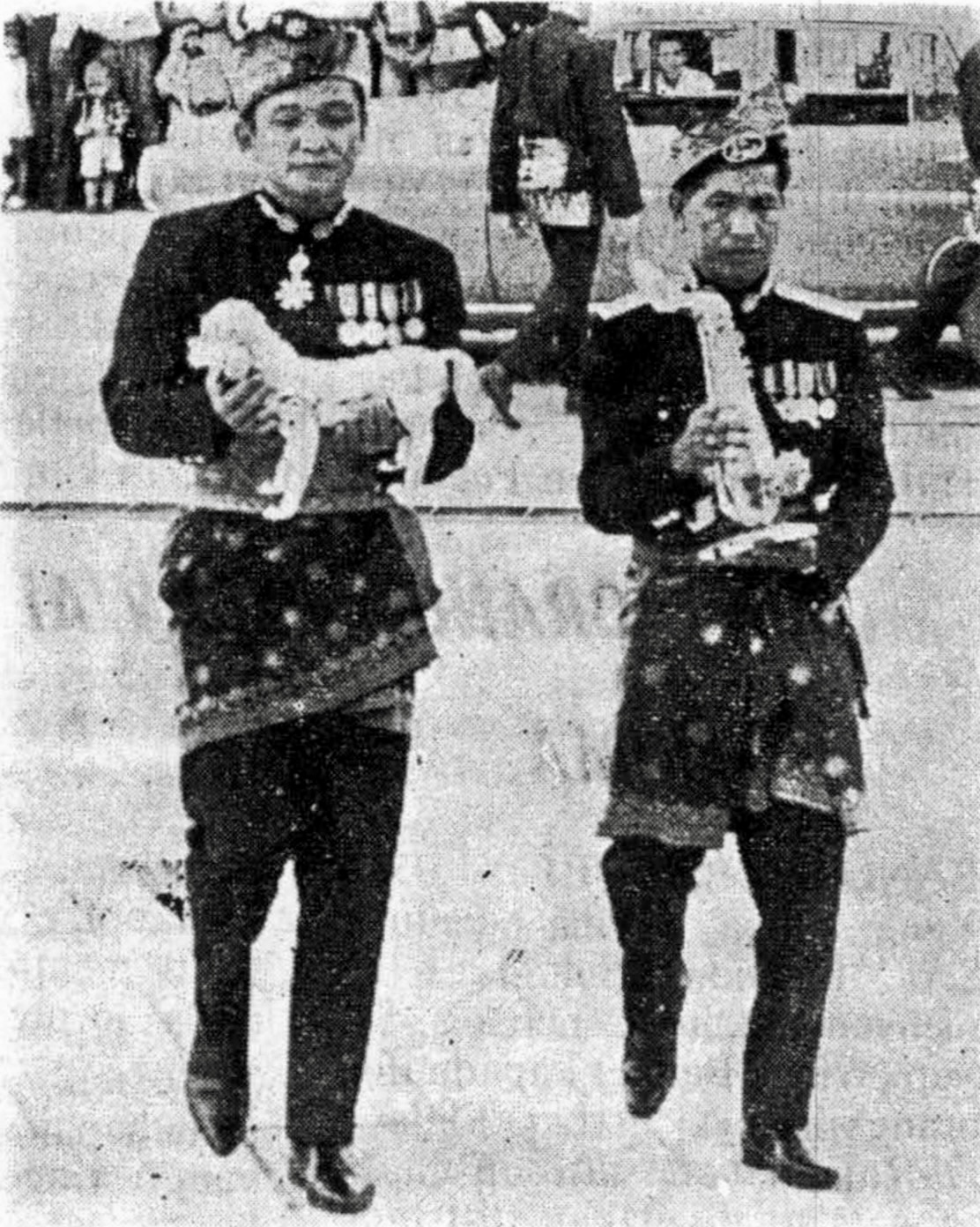
Abbas Al-Sufri (left) and Pengiran Abdul Momin (right) at the 1968 coronation ceremony

Pengiran Abdul Momin was named confidential clerk to Sultan Omar Ali Saifuddien III in 1961. During the 1962 haj, he was a member of Sultan Omar Ali Saifuddin III's entourage. On 1 August 1968, Pengiran Abdul Momin played a role in the coronation ceremony of Hassanal Bolkiah as the 29th sultan of Brunei, which was held at Lapau, Brunei Town. He carried the Tungkat Ajai, one of the 25 royal regalia used during the grand ceremony, while Abbas Al-Sufri carried the Kuching Emas. He was then named private and confidential secretary to Sultan Hassanal Bolkiah in 1968. In conjunction to Prince Mohamed Bolkiah's wedding in 1976, a 2-foot (0.61 m) long golden dagger was presented by him at Istana Darul Hana. His tenure as private and confidential secretary ended in 1992, when he retired.

Around 1992, Pengiran Abdul Momin served as deputy president of the Persatuan Kesatuan Islam Brunei before being recalled to government service. He was appointed ambassador to Indonesia, serving from 1993 to 2001, during which he signed the agreement that established diplomatic relations between Brunei and North Korea on 7 January 1999. During his tenure, he was also a board member of the Sultan Haji Hassanal Bolkiah Foundation from 1993 and again from 2000 to 2002. On 9 January 2002, he established and registered Kolej IGS (KIGS). Additionally, he held membership in the Islamic Religious Council and the Privy Council, among other state bodies.

Although not initially appointed to the newly revived LegCo on 6 September 2004, Pengiran Abdul Momin was later sworn in on 25 September. On 28 September, he backed a motion, recalling past unrest that led to the suspension of the 1959 Constitution, and prayed for lasting peace and stability. He also called on the government to provide educational support for children from low-income families to prevent neglect and ignorance. Sultan Hassanal Bolkiah approved the appointment of new LegCo members on 31 August 2005, with the dissolution of the previous council announced by the Prime Minister's Office on 1 September. This marked the end of Pengiran Abdul Momin's brief tenure in the council and his political career.

== Death ==
Pengiran Abdul Momin died at the age of 83 on 9 March 2006. His funeral was attended by Sultan Hassanal Bolkiah and Crown Prince Al-Muhtadee Billah, who joined the congregational funeral prayer at his residence in Kampong Sungai Akar. Other notable guests included members of the royal family such as Prince Abdul Malik, and Princess Masna were also in attendance. Half-mast flying of the flags was mandated.

== Personal life ==
Pengiran Abdul Momin was married to Datin Hajah Masurai binti Mohammad, and together they have 17 children, comprising 9 boys and 8 girls. Among their children are Pengiran Haji Mohd Alimin, Pengiran Haji Mohd Shahrimin, Pengiran Haji Mohd Waslimin, who serves as a member of the Football Association of Brunei Darussalam Executive Committee and former manager of DPMM FC, Pengiran Haji Mohd Yamin, who is the acting chairman of the board of directors of KIGS, and Pengiran Hajah Fatimah, an executive officer at KIGS.

== Titles, styles and honours ==
=== Titles and styles ===
Personal standard of Pengiran Setia Jaya

On 14 March 1969, Pengiran Abdul Momin was honoured by Sultan Hassanal Bolkiah with the cheteria title of Pengiran Setia Jaya, bearing the style Yang Amat Mulia.

=== Awards ===
He has been given the following awards:

- Tokoh Guru Berbakti (1995)
- Anugerah Tokoh Bakti Hijrah 1422 (2001)
- Tokoh Guru Suluh Budiman (2003)

=== Honours ===
Pengiran Abdul Momin has been bestowed the following honours:

National

- Family Order of Laila Utama (DK; 1972) – Dato Laila Utama
- Family Order of Seri Utama (DK; 11 August 1970) – Dato Seri Utama
- Order of Setia Negara Brunei Second Class (DSNB; 1968) – Dato Setia
- Order of Setia Negara Brunei Fourth Class (PSB; 23 September 1963)
- Order of Paduka Seri Laila Jasa Third Class (SLJ; 23 September 1967)
- Omar Ali Saifuddin Medal First Class (POAS; 23 September 1962)
- Sultan Hassanal Bolkiah Medal First Class (PHBS; 12 February 1969)
- Coronation Medal First Class (1969)
- Meritorious Service Medal (PJK)
- Long Service Medal (PKL; 23 September 1960)
- Campaign Medal

Foreign

- United Kingdom:
  - Commander of the Royal Victorian Order (CVO; 1972)
- Selangor:
  - Sultan Salahuddin Silver Jubilee Medal (3 September 1985)

=== Things named after him ===
- Pengiran Setia Jaya Pengiran Haji Abdul Momin Primary School, a school in Kuala Belait.
- Pengiran Setia Jaya Pengiran Abdul Momin Religious School, a religious school in Kampong Pandan.

== Notes ==
Diplomatic posts
Preceded by Badaruddin Othman	Ambassador of Brunei to Indonesia; August 1986 – March 1987	Succeeded by Husin Ahmad
