= Shari Ahmad =

Bruneian military officer

Yang Dimuliakan Pehin Datu Padukaraja Major General (Retired) Dato Paduka Seri Shari Ahmad DPKT PSPNB DSLJ SNB SMB PJK PIKB
- شري احمد
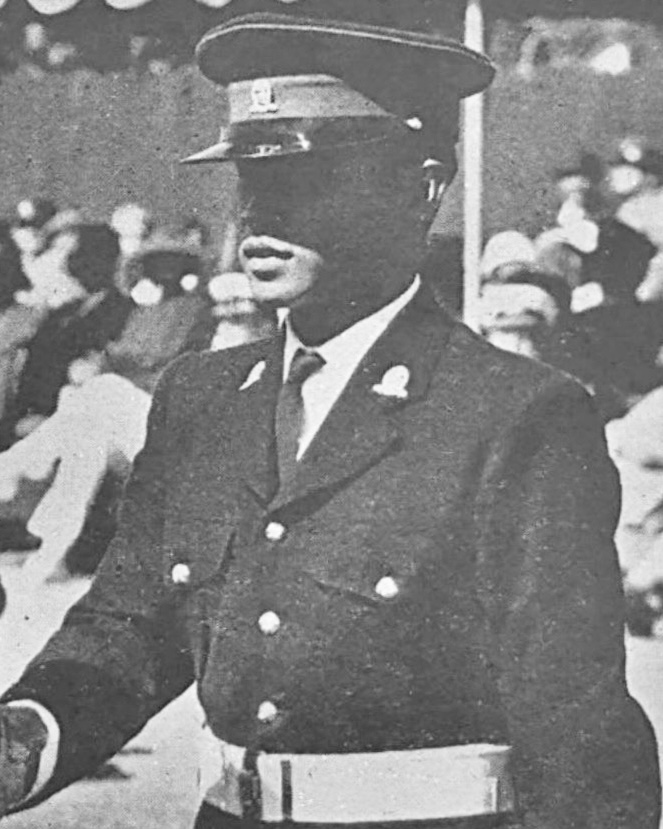
- Officer cadet Shari in 1966

5th Commander of the Royal Brunei Armed Forces
- In office 31 August 1999 – 2 April 2001
- Monarch: Hassanal Bolkiah
- Preceded by: Pengiran Abidin
- Succeeded by: Jaafar Abdul Aziz

2nd Commander of the Royal Brunei Land Force
- In office 11 August 1994 – 28 October 1999
- Preceded by: Husin Ahmad
- Succeeded by: Jaafar Abdul Aziz

Personal details
- Born: Rampayoh, Belait, Brunei
- Education: Officer Cadet School, Portsea
- Profession: Military officer

Military service
- Allegiance: Brunei
- Branch/service: Royal Brunei Land Force
- Years of service: 1966–2001
- Rank: Major General
- Unit: 'B' Company
- Commands: Royal Brunei Land Force; Royal Brunei Armed Forces

Shari bin Ahmad is a Bruneian aristocrat and retired military officer who became the fifth Commander of the Royal Brunei Armed Forces (RBAF) from 1999 until 2001, and the second Commander of the Royal Brunei Land Force (RBLF) from 1994 until 1999.

== Military career ==
Among the 72 cadet officers who graduated from Officer Cadet School, Portsea on 9 December 1966, Major general Walter S. McKinnon presented awards to two Bruneian cadets, namely Shari Ahmad and B.M. Ali.

In 1969, Lieutenant Colonel H.F. Burrows presented individual awards to the members of the Platoon No.5 of 'B' Company for winning the Seri Begawan Shield's shooting competition, held at Berakas Camp. As the winning team's captain, he received the shield for his achievement. On 11 August 1994, he was appointed as the Commander of the Royal Brunei Land Force, succeeding Husin Ahmad in that role before being replaced himself by Jaafar Abdul Aziz on 28 October 1999.

Major General Shari took command of the Royal Brunei Armed Forces on 31 August 1999. He attended the 2nd Asia-Pacific Chiefs of Defence Conference in Honolulu, that same year. On 16 February 2001, Shari made a farewell visit to the members of the armed forces of the Royal Brunei Armed Services (ATPBDB) at Bolkiah Garrison. Later on 2 April, Sultan Hassanal Bolkiah accepted an audience to him and his successor.

== Personal life ==
His residence was reported to be in Rampayoh of Labi in the Belait District. After his time in the military, he became the President of Veterans Association Royal Brunei Armed Forces (VARBAF). Notably, he previously held the position of President of the Veterans Confederation of ASEAN (Veconac). Launched in November 2014, the double-decker cruise ship MV Sentosa is run by a local business, Sha-Zan Marine, under the direction of the retired Shari Ahmad.

== Legacy ==
=== Things named after him ===
- Jalan Pehin Shari, a road in Tutong Camp

=== Honours ===
National

Shari was bestowed the Manteri title of Yang Dimuliakan Pehin Datu Padukaraja. Moreover, he has earned the following honours;

- Order of Paduka Keberanian Laila Terbilang First Class (DPKT; 15 July 2000) – Dato Paduka Seri
- Order of Pahlawan Negara Brunei First Class (PSPNB) – Dato Seri Pahlawan
- Order of Paduka Seri Laila Jasa Second Class (DSLJ; 11 February 1976) – Dato Seri Laila Jasa
- Order of Setia Negara Brunei Third Class (SNB)
- Order of Seri Paduka Mahkota Brunei Third Class (SMB)
- Meritorious Service Medal (PJK; 2 June 1976)
- Excellent Service Medal (PIKB)
- Sultan of Brunei Silver Jubilee Medal (5 October 1992)
- Royal Brunei Armed Forces Silver Jubilee Medal (31 May 1986)
- Proclamation of Independence Medal (1997)
- General Service Medal
- Long Service Medal and Good Conduct (PKLPB)

Foreign

- Singapore:
  - Pingat Jasa Gemilang (Tentera) (PJG; 28 June 1996)
  - Darjah Utama Bakti Cemerlang (Tentera) (DUBC; 5 February 2001)

Military offices
Preceded by Pengiran Abidin	5th Commander of the Royal Brunei Armed Forces; 31 August 1999 – 2 April 2001	Succeeded by Jaafar Abdul Aziz
Preceded by Husin Ahmad	2nd Commander of the Royal Brunei Land Force; 11 August 1994 – 28 October 1999	Succeeded by Jaafar Abdul Aziz
