= Husin Ahmad =

Bruneian military officer (born 1944)

Yang Dimuliakan Pehin Datu Harimau Padang Major General (Retired) Dato Paduka Seri Husin Ahmad DPKT PSPNB DSLJ PaNB PHBS PJK
- حسين احمد
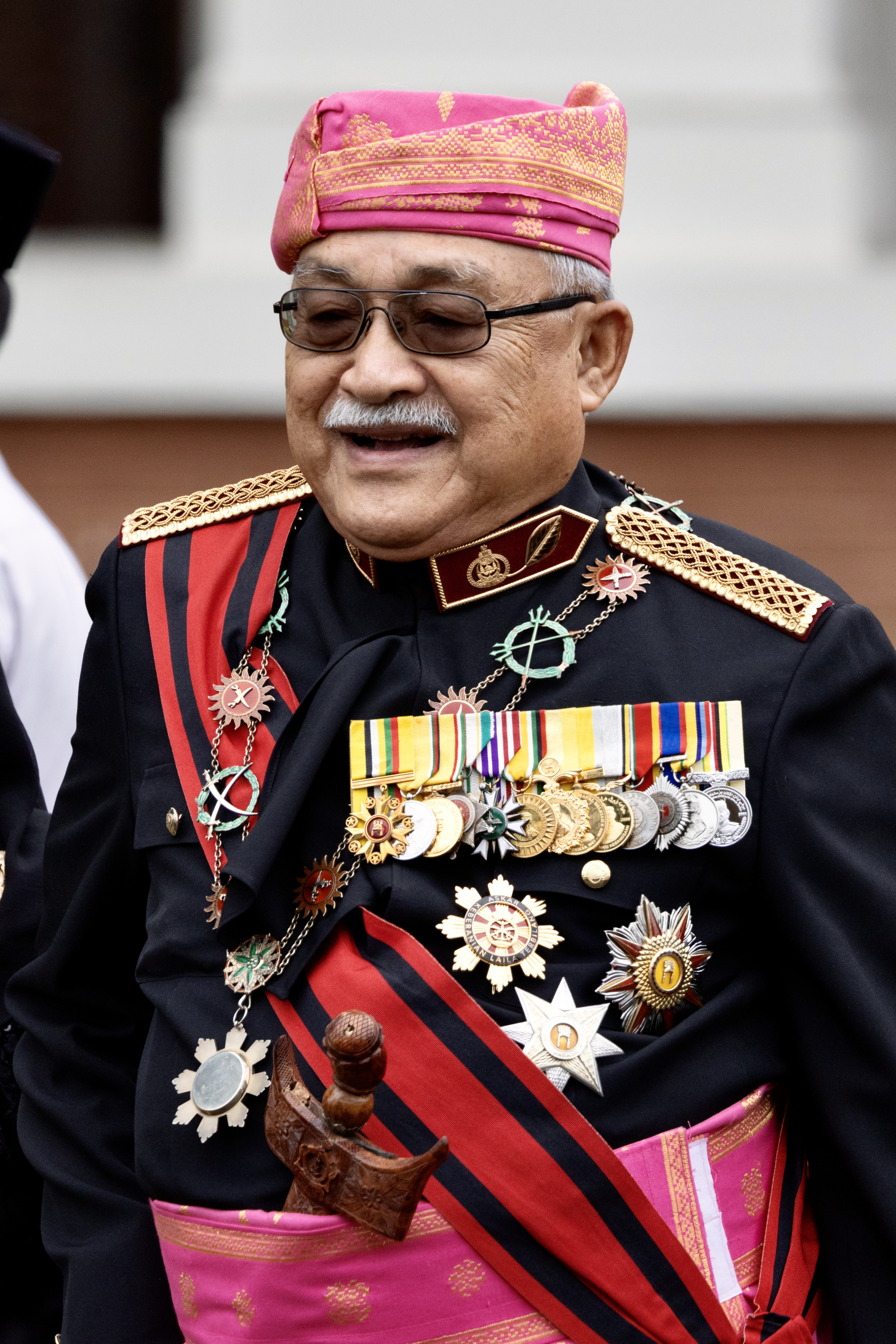
- Husin in 2024

Ambassador of Brunei to Indonesia
- In office 2006–2007
- Preceded by: Pengiran Abdul Momin
- Succeeded by: Mahmud Saidin

Ambassador of Brunei to Jordan
- In office 10 July 2001 – 8 May 2006
- Preceded by: Abdul Saman Kahar
- Succeeded by: Abdul Mokti Daud

3rd Commander of the Royal Brunei Armed Forces
- In office 30 September 1994 – 29 September 1997
- Monarch: Hassanal Bolkiah
- Preceded by: Sulaiman Damit
- Succeeded by: Pengiran Abidin

1st Commander of the Royal Brunei Land Force
- In office 17 September 1991 – 10 August 1994
- Preceded by: Position established
- Succeeded by: Shari Ahmad

Personal details
- Born: 11 July 1944 (age 82) Kampong Keriam, Tutong, Brunei
- Spouse: Juliana Abu Bakar
- Parents: Ahmad Mali (father); Halimah Hussin (mother)
- Education: National Defense University
- Profession: Diplomat; military officer

Military service
- Branch/service: Royal Brunei Land Force
- Years of service: 1964–1997
- Rank: Major General
- Unit: Second Battalion, RBMR
- Commands: Royal Brunei Land Force; Royal Brunei Armed Forces

Husin bin Ahmad (Note: The alternate spelling of his given name is "Hussin" rather than "Husin.") (born 11 July 1944) is a Bruneian aristocrat, diplomat and retired military officer who served as the first commander of the Royal Brunei Land Forces (RBLF) from 1991 to 1994, and later the Royal Brunei Armed Forces (RBAF) from 1994 until 1997.

== Early life and education ==
On 11 July 1944, Husin bin Ahmad was born in Tutong District's Kampong Keriam. Dayang Hajah Halimah binti Hussin is his mother's name, while Awang Ahmad bin Mali is his father. Of his nine siblings, he is the youngest. He later married Pengiran Datin Hajah Juliana binti Pengiran Jaya Negara Pengiran Haji Abu Bakar in 1967. Dayang Huslina, Haji Mohammad Huzaimi, (Note: Later becoming Lieutenant Colonel Haji Mohamad Huzaimi, Head of Inspectorate Unit of the RBLF. He also won gold in the 30th SEA Games polo competitions.) Dayang Norhayati, and Ahmad Omar (Note: Haji Ahmad Omar became the managing director of NBT (Brunei).) are the four children he and his wife had together as a consequence of their marriage.

Husin was educated in the Tutong District's Keriam Malay School and Penanjong Malay School throughout his early years. He enrolled in Anthony Abell College, Seria. After that, he pursued his education in Sultan Omar Ali Saifuddien College, in Brunei.

== Military career ==
On 10 November 1964, Husin enlisted as a cadet officer in Brunei Malay Regiment (BMR). This marked the start of his military career. He then underwent officer cadet training at Mons Officer Cadet School, Aldershot, United Kingdom in 1965. On 10 July 1965, he received his promotion to a Second Lieutenant after completing his training. In 1966, he returned to Brunei following his training. Initially, he was assigned to a number of significant roles within the Royal Brunei Malay Regiment (RBMR). He was the Platoon 9 commander in his first role.

Husin was promoted to the rank of Lieutenant on 11 August 1968. He was promoted to the rank of Captain on 1 May 1969. Later on 22 June 1970, he was promoted to the rank of Adjutant. On 13 October 1972, he received a promotion to Major. He became the Second Battalion's Deputy Commander in 1975. He assumed command of the Second Battalion on 2 February 1982, and remained there until 30 September 1985. He received a promotion to Colonel and was named the RBAF' Director of Ground Training that same year.

From 1987 to 1989, Husin was Director of Ground Training. He was named the RBAF' Deputy Commander on 17 July 1989. He has held positions as an officer of duty and planning. His tenure as Duty and Planning Officer was from 1991 until 1994. On 28 June 1991, he was named Commander of the RBLF, becoming the first Brunei local to be selected for this role. On 17 September 1991, the RBAF underwent restructuring which resulted in the division into three primary service branches. He was promoted to the rank of Brigadier General on 1 July 1993.

Husin was promoted to the rank of Major General the following year. He held the position of Commander of the RBLF for an estimated 3 years before being succeeded by Shari Ahmad on 10 August 1994. On the same day, he was named the 3rd Commander of the RBAF, succeeding Major General Sulaiman Damit, who had retired from the post. His tenure as the RBAF Commander ended on 29 September 1997. Major General Abidin Ahmad took his post. He was deeply concerned about the growth and well-being of every member of the RBAF throughout his tenure as Commander. One of the things he highlighted most was the army's duty to impose physical condition. His primary goal is to raise everyone's physical endurance to a new level, especially that of the officers of the RBAF.

Husin took many overseas military courses while serving in the RBAF. He has taken courses in the UK including Staff College Course, Junior Staff Officer Course, and Platoon Leader Tactics Course. In 1988–1989, he also enrolled in a course at the National Defense University in Washington, DC.

== Later life ==
After his military career, he was the Brunei high commissioner to Amman, Jordan from 10 July 2001 to 8 May 2006. He would be reappointed as the new ambassador to Indonesia in 2006. Husin Ahmad has the title of Pehin Datu Harimaupadang and has been assigned to the Additional Manteri 32. He serves as the chairman of the Council's Supreme Committee, Ibnu Basit Apong, and Mohammad Daud were present for the Sultan's departure from the Royal Berkshire Hall, Jerudong Polo Club on 1 August 2016.

== Titles, styles and honours ==
=== Honours ===
Husin was awarded the Manteri title of Yang Dimuliakan Pehin Datu Harimau Padang by Sultan Hassanal Bolkiah on 3 March 1975. Examples of honours awarded to him;

National

- Order of Paduka Keberanian Laila Terbilang First Class (DPKT) – Dato Paduka Seri
- Order of Pahlawan Negara Brunei First Class (PSPNB; 15 July 1994) – Dato Seri Pahlawan
- Order of Paduka Seri Laila Jasa Second Class (DSLJ; 10 February 1976) – Dato Seri Laila Jasa
- Order of Paduka Seri Laila Jasa Third Class (SLJ; 1971)
- Order of Perwira Agong Negara Brunei Second Class (PaNB; 18 April 1967)
- Sultan Hassanal Bolkiah Medal First Class (PHBS; 12 April 1969)
- Meritorious Service Medal (PJK; 2 June 1976)
- Sultan of Brunei Silver Jubilee Medal (5 October 1992)
- Sultan of Brunei Golden Jubilee Medal (5 October 2017)
- National Day Silver Jubilee Medal (23 February 2009)
- Royal Brunei Armed Forces Silver Jubilee Medal (31 May 1986)
- Royal Brunei Armed Forces Diamond Jubilee Medal (31 May 2021)
- General Service Medal
- Long Service Medal and Good Conduct (PKLPB)
- Proclamation of Independence Medal (1997)
- Inauguration Medal (1965)

Foreign

- Singapore:
  - Darjah Utama Bakti Cemerlang (DUBC; 14 February 1996)
  - Pingat Jasa Gemilang (Tentera) (PJG; 30 April 1994)
- Indonesia:
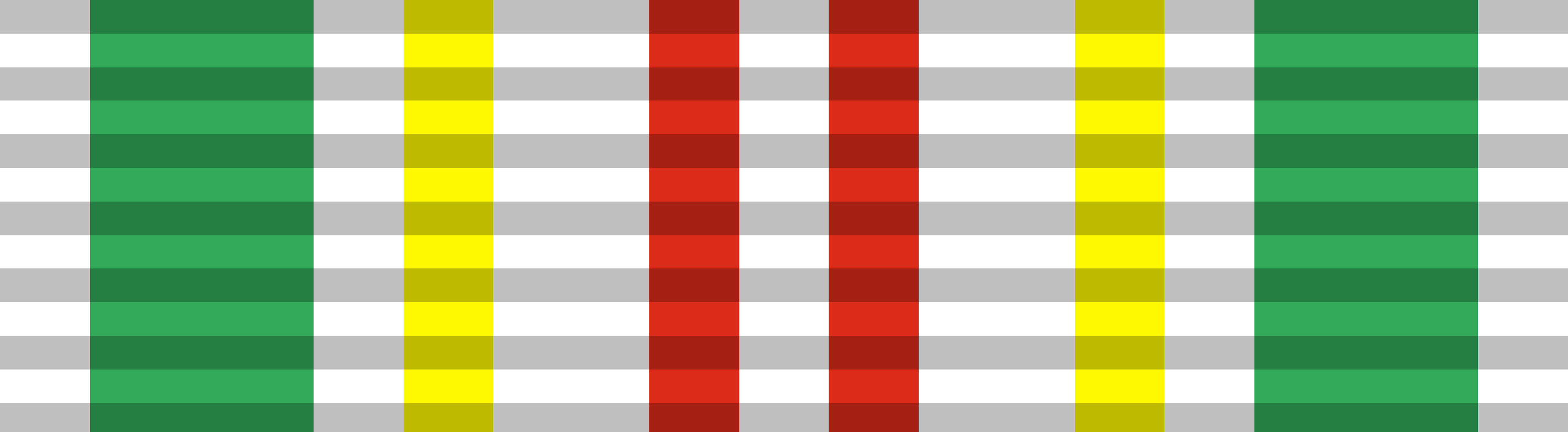
  - Bintang Yudha Dharma Utama (BYD)
- Thailand:
  - Knight Grand Cross of the Order of the Crown of Thailand (PM (GCCT)) (2 September 1997)
- Philippines:
  - Commander of the Philippine Legion of Honor (CLH)

=== Things named after him ===
- Jalan Pehin Hussin, a road in Tutong Camp

== Notes ==
Diplomatic posts
| Preceded by Pengiran Abdul Momin | Ambassador of Brunei to Indonesia; 2006–2007 | Succeeded by Mahmud Saidin |
| Preceded by Abdul Saman Kahar | Ambassador of Brunei to Jordan; 10 July 2001 – 8 May 2006 | Succeeded by Abdul Mokti Daud |
Military offices
| Preceded by Sulaiman Damit | 3rd Commander of the Royal Brunei Armed Forces; 30 September 1994 – 29 September 1997 | Succeeded by Pengiran Abidin |
| Preceded by Position established | 1st Commander of the Royal Brunei Land Forces; 17 September 1991 – 10 August 1994 | Succeeded by Shari Ahmad |
