= Sulaiman Damit =

Bruneian diplomat and military office (born 1941–2016)

Yang Dimuliakan Pehin Datu Indera Setia Major General (Retired) Dato Paduka Seri Sulaiman Damit DPKT SPMB SNB SLJ PHBS
- سليمان داميت
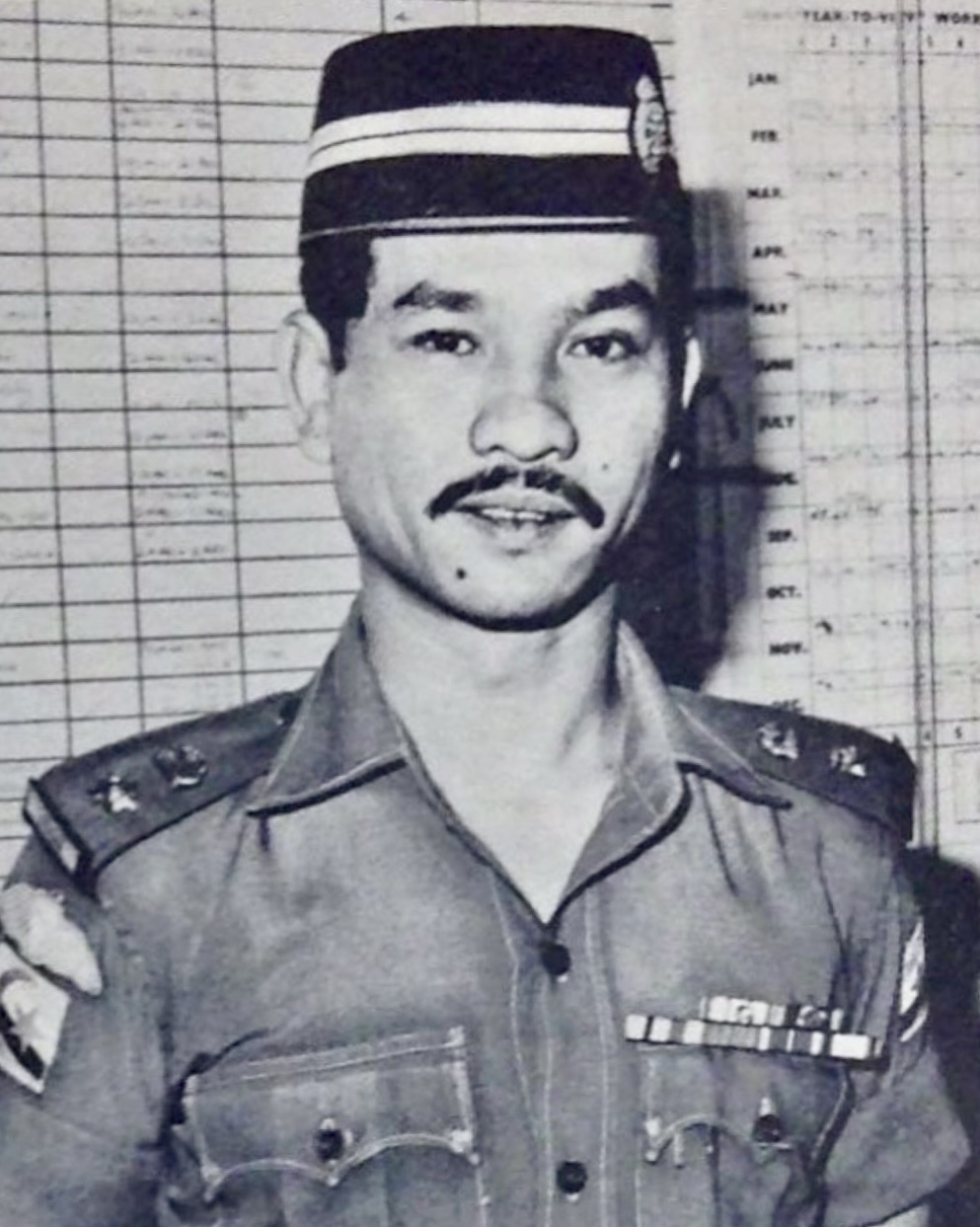
- Sulaiman in 1973

Ambassador of Brunei to Egypt
- In office 7 September 1995 – 3 June 1998
- Preceded by: Mohammad Daud

2nd Commander of the Royal Brunei Armed Forces
- In office 10 August 1990 – 29 September 1994
- Monarch: Hassanal Bolkiah
- Preceded by: Mohammad Daud
- Succeeded by: Husin Ahmad

Personal details
- Born: 28 March 1941 Kampong Keriam, Tutong, Brunei
- Died: 8 July 2016 (aged 75) Bandar Seri Begawan, Brunei
- Resting place: Sugan Muslim Cemetery, Tutong, Brunei
- Spouse: Noraini Ja'afar
- Education: Anthony Abell College; Federation Military College; Staff College, Camberley; Royal College of Defence Studies
- Profession: Diplomat; military officer

Military service
- Branch/service: Royal Brunei Land Force
- Years of service: 1962–1994
- Rank: Major General
- Commands: Training Wing Depot; Royal Brunei Armed Forces

Sulaiman bin Damit (28 March 1941 – 8 July 2016) is a Bruneian aristocrat, diplomat, and military officer who served as the second commander of the Royal Brunei Armed Forces (RBAF) from 1990 to 1994. He later became Brunei's ambassador to Egypt from 1995 to 1998.

== Early life and education ==
Sulaiman bin Damit was born on 28 March 1941 in Kampong Keriam, Tutong District. He began his formal education at Seria Malay School from 1948 to 1952 before continuing his studies at Anthony Abell College from 1953 to 1960. In early December 1960, a radio station and the local newspaper announced a two-year officer cadet training opportunity at the Federation Military College (FMC) in Malaya. By mid-December, 17 cadets who had applied for the programme underwent a selection process at the Sultan Omar Ali Saifuddien College gymnasium in Tasek Lama, where they were interviewed by a panel of four officers from the Malayan armed forces. Only three out of the seven candidates were selected: Sulaiman, Mohammad Daud, and Awangku Ibnu Basit, who became known as the "three musketeers". On 24 December 1960, they took their oaths before departing Brunei the next day through Singapore.

During their first year as junior cadets, they underwent basic military training, which included parade drills, weapons handling, tactics, administration, and the military code of justice. Alongside their military instruction, they also received academic education to prepare for the Higher School Certificate, equivalent to the GCE 'A' Level. Their second year of senior cadet training was significantly more challenging. By 4 November 1961, as part of the Malayan armed forces, the cadets were temporarily assigned to a battalion in Mentakab, Pahang, and Pengkalan Chepa, Kelantan, where they gained practical experience and further honed their skills.

== Military career ==
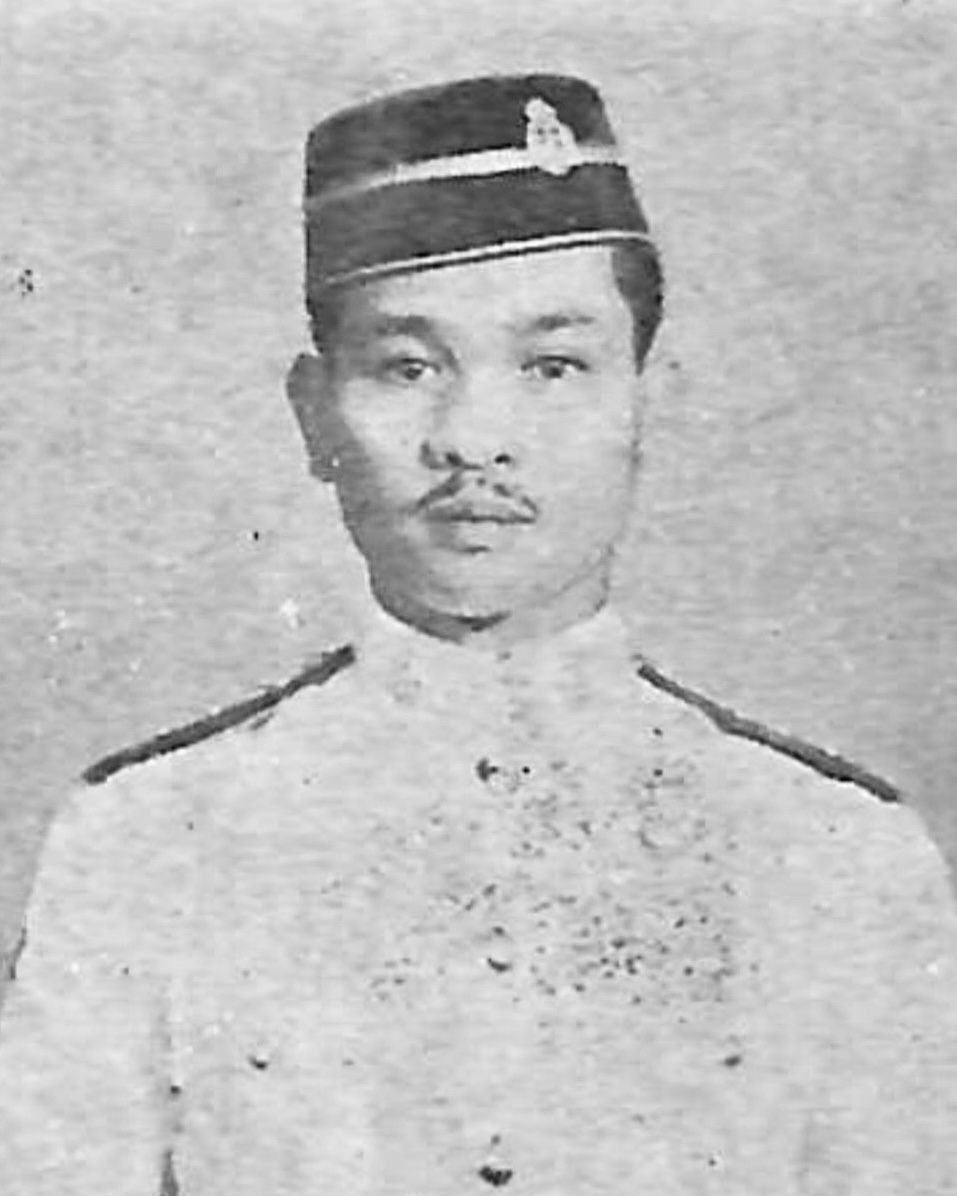
Sulaiman in the Brunei Malay Regiment, c. 1969

On 8 December 1962, Sulaiman was among the three musketeers to be commissioned as a second lieutenant by Sultan Omar Ali Saifuddien III, in a ceremony presided over by the Yang di-Pertuan Agong of Malaya, Putra of Perlis. This marked the official start of his military career. Having completed his officer cadet training, he had earned the rank of second lieutenant. During his time at the FMC, Sulaiman underwent training in infantry tactics, jungle warfare, public order management, and ceremonial duties, all of which equipped him for a future leadership role in the armed forces. In 1968, he, alongside the other "three musketeers," underwent advanced small weapons and tactics training at the British Army School of Infantry in Warminster. This was followed by attachments to three British battalions in Germany and a British infantry brigade. On 1 July 1969, he was promoted to major, alongside Captain H. N. Houghton, after completing this training.

In 1971, Sulaiman attended the British Army Staff College in Camberley to further his professional development. He and Ariffin Abdul Wahab became the first local servicemen to be promoted to lieutenant colonel in 1976. During the 1986 defence reshuffle, he was elevated to brigadier general and appointed commander task force. After completing a programme at the Royal College of Defence Studies in London, he was appointed deputy commander of the RBAF. On 10 August 1990, he was ultimately promoted to commander of the RBAF and chief of armed forces staff.

The Royal Brunei Air Force, Royal Brunei Navy, Royal Brunei Land Force, RBAF Support Services, and Training Institute RBAF were the five distinct divisions that emerged from the RBAF's significant reform on 1 October 1991, under Sulaiman's command. With each division having its own headquarters and still being directly answerable to RBAF command, this reform sought to simplify command, administration, and control. Brunei's emphasis on protecting its exclusive economic zone and improving air and sea capabilities to protect economic resources in the face of regional geopolitical changes was in line with the reorganisation. The RBAF also earned its first blue beret in November 1992, for the participation of its officers in the United Nations Transitional Authority in Cambodia. Sulaiman served as commander until 29 September 1994.

== Later life and death ==
Upon his military retirement in 1994, Sulaiman was appointed as ambassador of Brunei to Egypt. He held the post from 7 September 1995 to 3 June 1998. Sulaiman died on Friday, 8 July 2016, at the age of 75. He was laid to rest at Sugan Muslim Cemetery in Bukit Bendera, Pekan Tutong.

== Personal life ==
Sulaiman is married to Datin Hajah Noraini binti Haji Mohd Ja'afar, and they have three sons and two daughters. His son, Lieutenant Colonel (U) Mohammad Khairul, previously served as the chief instructor at the Defence Academy RBAF. Meanwhile, his other son, Muhammad Adib, is the ketua kampung of Kampong Panchor, which includes Kampong Panchor Dulit and Kampong Panchor Papan.

== Titles, styles and honours ==
=== Titles and styles ===
On 3 October 1974, Sulaiman was honoured by Sultan Hassanal Bolkiah with the manteri title of Pehin Datu Indera Setia, bearing the style Yang Dimuliakan.

=== Honours ===
Sulaiman has been bestowed the following honours:

National

- Order of Paduka Keberanian Laila Terbilang First Class (DPKT) – Dato Paduka Seri
- Order of Seri Paduka Mahkota Brunei First Class (SPMB) – Dato Seri Paduka
- Order of Setia Negara Brunei Third Class (SNB)
- Order of Paduka Seri Laila Jasa Third Class (SLJ)
- Sultan Hassanal Bolkiah Medal (PHBS; 1968)
- Sultan of Brunei Silver Jubilee Medal (5 October 1992)
- Royal Brunei Armed Forces Silver Jubilee Medal (31 May 1986)
- General Service Medal
- Long Service Medal and Good Conduct (PKLPB)
- Proclamation of Independence Medal (1997)

Foreign

- Malaysia:
  - Commander of the Order of Loyalty to the Crown of Malaysia (PSM; 1995) – Tan Sri
  - Honorary Courageous Commander of The Most Gallant Order of Military Service (PGAT; 1994)
- Thailand:
  - Knight Grand Cross of the Order of The White Elephant (PCh (KCE); 1991)
  - Knight Grand Cross of the Order of the Crown of Thailand (PM (GCCT); 1987)
- Indonesia:
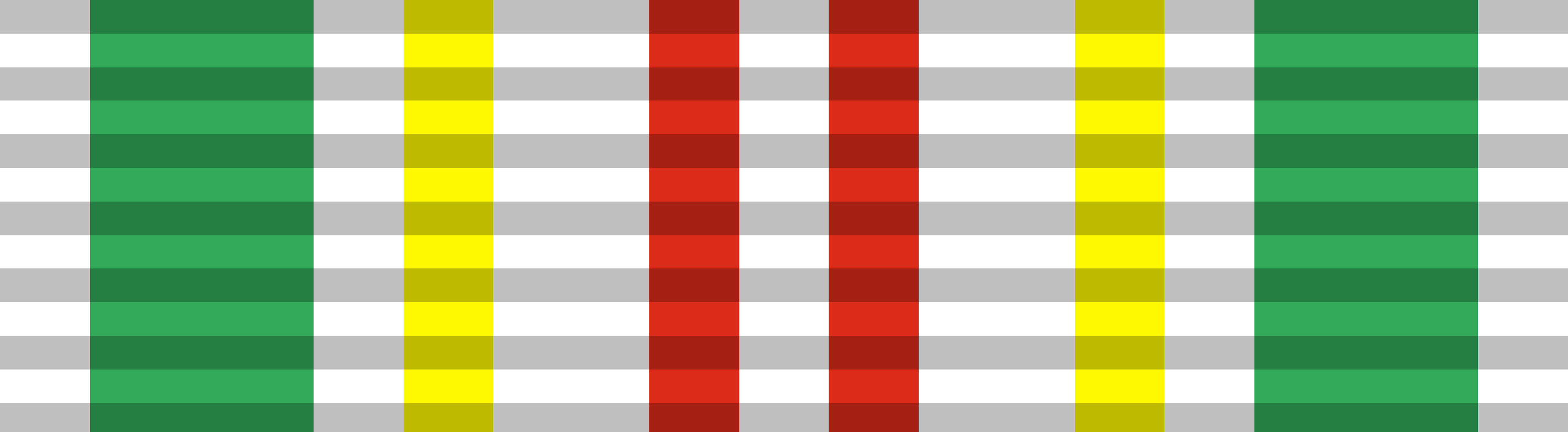
  - Grand Meritorious Military Order Star, 1st Class (1993)
- Singapore:
  - Darjah Utama Bakti Cemerlang (Tentera) (DUBC; 4 February 1994)
- Philippines:
  - Commander of the Philippine Legion of Honor (1991)
- South Korea:
  - Order of National Security Merit Tong-il (1992)

=== Things named after him ===
- Jalan Pehin Sulaiman, a road in Tutong Camp

Diplomatic posts
Preceded by Mohammad Daud	Bruneian Ambassador to Egypt; 7 September 1995 – 3 June 1998	Succeeded by –
Military offices
Preceded by Mohammad Daud	2nd Commander of the Royal Brunei Armed Forces; 10 August 1990 – 29 September 1994	Succeeded by Husin Ahmad
