= Brinded =

Brinded is a surname. Notable people with the surname include:

- Colin Brinded (1946–2005), English snooker referee
- Malcolm Brinded (born 1953), British businessman
