= Ken Kobayashi =

Japanese chief executive (born 1949)

Dato Seri Laila Jasa Ken Kobayashi DSLJ
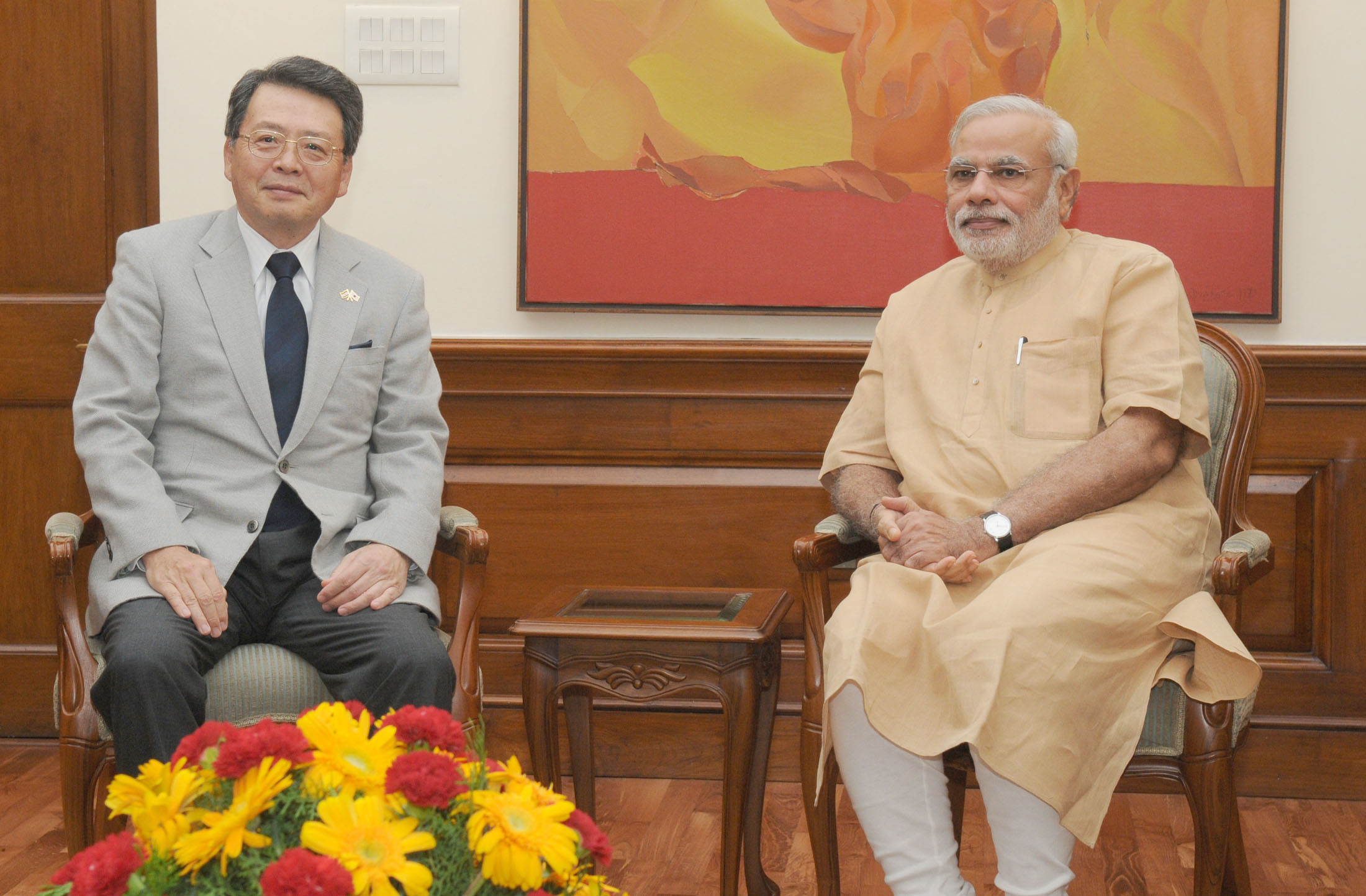
- Ken Kobayashi (left) with Indian PM Narendra Modi
- Born: February 14, 1949 (age 77); Japan
- Occupations: Chairman, Mitsubishi Corporation

Ken Kobayashi (小林 健, Kobayashi Ken; born February 14, 1949) is a Japanese businessman and current chairman of Mitsubishi Corporation. He previously served as president and CEO from April 2010 to April 2016. He has held positions with the company since 1971.

== Early life and education ==
Kobayashi received bachelor's degree in law from the University of Tokyo in 1971.

== Career ==
Since becoming CEO, Kobayashi was able to effectively manage the company to an ROA of 1.5%.

On 10 April 2024, Kobayashi was among the guests invited to the state dinner hosted by U.S. President Joe Biden in honor of Prime Minister Fumio Kishida at the White House.

== Honors ==
- Brunei:
  - Order of Paduka Seri Laila Jasa Second Class (DSLJ) – Dato Seri Laila Jasa (15 July 2012)
