= Mons Officer Cadet School =

- Active: 1942–1972
- Country: United Kingdom
- Allegiance: British Armed Forces
- Branch: British Army
- Type: Training
- Role: Officer cadet training
- Garrison/HQ: Aldershot

Mons Officer Cadet School was a British military training establishment for officer cadets in Aldershot from 1942 to 1972, when it was closed and all officer training concentrated at Sandhurst. The training course at Mons was for National Service and Short Service Officer Cadets, Territorial Army officers, and those joining the Regular Army as graduates, except for infantry officers. It was relatively short, usually lasting only six months or even less, compared with two years at Sandhurst.

== History ==
Mons Barracks was originally constructed from 1926 to 1927 for the Royal Signals and in 1931 appeared in Prince's Avenue, Aldershot, on the 25-inch Ordnance Survey map of the area, marked as "Mons Barracks (Royal Corps of Signals)". In 1939, the Royal Military College, Sandhurst, became the home of 161 Infantry Officer Cadet Training Unit (RMC): that unit moved to Mons Barracks at Aldershot in 1942, and subsequently became known as the "Mons Officer Cadet Training Unit (Aldershot)", which in 1947 was re-organised as an Officer Cadet Training Unit (OCTU) for short service and National Service officer cadets of the technical arms, i.e. officer cadets of the Royal Artillery and Royal Armoured Corps.

In the 1950s, candidates for National Service commissions, which were unlikely to last more than two years, received a cut-down version of officer training, lasting for sixteen weeks, either at the Mons Officer Cadet Training Unit at Aldershot or the Eaton Hall OCTU near Chester.

Shortly before National Service was abolished in 1960, the Mons and Eaton Hall OCTUs were combined to form the Mons Officer Cadet School. Mons was made responsible for training all Short Service Officer Cadets, and for those joining the Regular Army as graduates. Later, Mons also became responsible for final training of candidates for Territorial Army commissions. The intensive training that emphasised cadets' duties as subalterns, rather than as field officers and generals, was fast and efficient, and attractive to potential officers since the course lasted just six months compared to two years at Sandhurst.

Ranulph Fiennes trained at Mons in 1963 and later recalled “Instead of two years at Sandhurst there would be five months concentrated training at Mons Officer Cadet School. At Mons, half of us were white; the rest black, brown and yellow. Everyone got on fine so long as they pulled their weight.”

The Mons OCS was closed in 1972, and its responsibilities transferred to the Royal Military Academy Sandhurst, which was re-organised as an academy for all British Army student officers and officer cadets, including short servicemen, regulars, and Territorials.

== Notable graduates ==
See also Category:Graduates of the Mons Officer Cadet School

- George E. Mudenda, retired Zambian Army Brigadier-General and Adjutant-General
- Godwin Alabi-Isama, Brigadier General, Nigerian Army
- Chukwuemeka Odumegwu-Ojukwu, Nigerian Army, Military Governor of the Eastern Region, Leader of the secessionist State of Biafra
- Alexander, Crown Prince of Yugoslavia
- Sani Abacha, former military President of Nigeria
- Hamad ibn Isa Al Khalifa, King of Bahrain
- Hamad bin Mohammed Al Sharqi, Hakem of Fujairah
- D. W. Hapuarachchi, Major General Sri Lanka Army
- Nicholas Soames, Baron Soames of Fletching
- Samuel Ogbemudia, Brigadier General, Nigerian Army. Military Administrator of Bendel
- Robin Rhoderick-Jones, Brigadier and Author
- Akwasi Amankwaa Afrifa, Ghanaian Head of State
- Joseph Nanven Garba, Nigerian Army general, diplomat, and politician
- George Agbazika Innih. Nigerian Army general and politician
- Miles Hunt-Davis, British Army brigadier
- Emmanuel E Ikwue, Nigerian Air Force Chief of the Air Staff
- Mohammed Sani Sami, Nigerian Army brigadier and Governor of Bauchi State, Nigeria
- John Amadu Bangura, Sierra Leone Army brigadier and acting Governor-General of Sierra Leone
- Muhammadu Buhari, Nigerian Army, President of Nigeria.
- Olusegun Obasanjo, former Nigerian President and General
- Bashiru Jinadu, Nigerian Army Major-General
- Kit Lambert, manager of the Who
- Robin Collier MC
- Mohammed bin Rashid Al Maktoum, Emir of Dubai, Vice President and Prime Minister of the United Arab Emirates
- Tony Hunter-Choat, British soldier who served in the French Foreign Legion
- Derek Chanda Mutoni, retired Zambian Army Brigadier-General
- David A. Granger, Guyanese Army retired brigadier general, president of Guyana
- Michael Heseltine, Deputy Prime Minister
- Sheikh Ahmad Bin Jassim Al Thani, head of Emiri Security, Qatar
- Ranulph Fiennes, explorer
- Hassan Usman Katsina, Nigerian Army, Governor of Northern Nigeria, Chief of Army Staff
- Abidin Ahmad, Commander of the Royal Brunei Armed Forces
- Husin Ahmad, military officer and a member of Manteri
- Manken Chigawa Malawi Army Commander
