= Jaafar Abdul Aziz =

Bruneian military officer

Yang Dimuliakan Pehin Orang Kaya Lela Pahlawan Major General (Retired) Dato Paduka Seri Jaafar Abdul Aziz DPKT DSLJ SMB
- جعفر عبدالعزيز
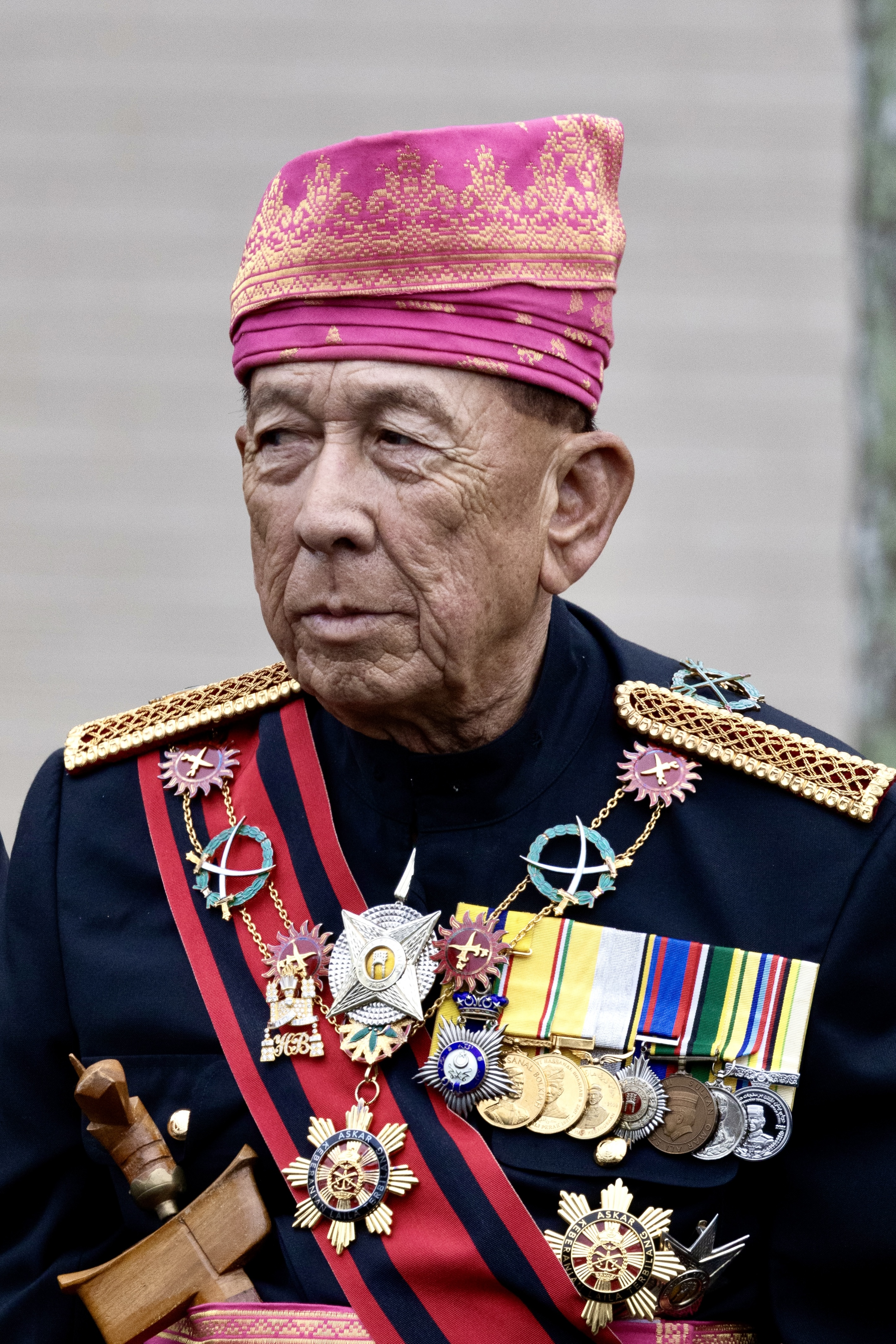
- Pehin Jaafar in 2024

6th Commander of the Royal Brunei Armed Forces
- In office 2 April 2001 – 27 March 2003
- Monarch: Hassanal Bolkiah
- Preceded by: Shari Ahmad
- Succeeded by: Halbi Mohammad Yussof

3rd Commander of the Royal Brunei Land Force
- In office 29 October 1999 – 31 January 2001
- Preceded by: Shari Ahmad
- Succeeded by: Halbi Mohd Yussof

Personal details
- Born: 6 August 1947 (age 79) Brunei
- Relations: Mariam Abdul Aziz (sister); Ismael Samid (nephew)
- Parent(s): Abdul Aziz Abdullah (father); Pengiran Hajah Rashida (mother)
- Education: Officer Cadet School, Portsea; Australian Defence College
- Occupation: Military officer; businessman

Military service
- Allegiance: Brunei
- Branch/service: Royal Brunei Land Force
- Years of service: 1969–2003
- Rank: Major General
- Unit: 'B' Company
- Commands: Royal Brunei Armed Forces; Royal Brunei Land Force

Mohd Jaafar bin Haji Abdul Aziz is a Bruneian aristocrat, businessman and former military officer who served as the third Commander of the Royal Brunei Land Force (RBLF) from 1999 until 2001, and the sixth Commander of the Royal Brunei Armed Forces (RBAF) from 2001 to 2003.

== Military career ==
After enlisting and completing basic training, he then joined the Royal Brunei Malay Regiment (RBMR) as an officer on 30 June 1969, later promoted to junior officer on 11 December 1970. During a military exercise in Berakas Camp in 1969, Cadet Jaafar was among the servicemen awarded by Prince Mohamed for excellence in shooting. During the 10th Anniversary of the founding of the RBMR in 1971, the junior lieutenant was among the soldiers in the parade holding the flag of Colonel-in-chief. In 1991, he attended the Defence and Strategic Studies Course (DSSC) at the Australian Defence College in Canberra. On 28 October 1999, Colonel Jaafar succeeded Shari Ahmad as the Commander of the RBLF. He became a major general on 1 February 2001. Later on 2 April, he assumed leadership of the RBAF. In 2002, he called on Deputy Prime Minister and Minister of Defence Tony Tan in Singapore. On 8 May, him alongside Sultan Hassanal Bolkiah welcomed Thailand's Chief of Defence Forces, Narong Yuthavong.

== Later life ==
After his military career, he became a member of the Veterans Association of Royal Brunei Armed Forces (PERWIRA), and the advisor to the Al-Ameerah Al-Hajjah Maryam Masjid Improvement Committee. In addition to this, Jaafar is the chairman of Richland Insurance since 2004, and board of directors of HSE Engineering. Prior to their departure for the Asia Softball Masters 2022, team managers were given the national flag by the president of the Brunei Amateur Softball and Baseball Association (BASBA), Jaafar, at the Brunei International Airport. In a ceremony in 2023, donations were given to 61 less fortunate groups from Kampong Jerudong 'A' and 'B' and 58 orphans. Jaafar, a consultant for Kampong Jerudong 'A' Consultative Council, delivered the gifts.

== Personal life ==
Jaafar is married to Datin Hajah Salbiah binti Mohd Yusof, and together they are known to have four sons, Mohammed Nazlee, Abdul Azeez, and 3 daughters, Athiyyah As'ad. He is also the brother of Hajah Mariam and Lieutenant Colonel (Retired) Dato Setia Haji Mohd Samid.

32 Brunei Darussalam Association of Senior Golfers (BDASG) golfers were in Chiang Mai for the competition that takes place from 27 to 29 October 2015. The team is vying for six championship trophies under the direction of Pehin Dato Jaafar.

== Legacy ==
=== Things named after him ===
- Jalan Pehin Mohd Jaafar, a road in Tutong Camp

=== Honours ===
National

Jaafar was awarded the Manteri title of Yang Dimuliakan Pehin Orang Kaya Lela Pahlawan. Known honours awarded to him are;

- Order of Paduka Keberanian Laila Terbilang First Class (DPKT; 15 July 2001) – Dato Paduka Seri
- Order of Paduka Seri Laila Jasa Second Class (DSLJ) – Dato Seri Laila Jasa
- Order of Seri Paduka Mahkota Brunei Third Class (SMB)
- Proclamation of Independence Medal (1997)
- Sultan of Brunei Silver Jubilee Medal (5 October 1992)
- National Day Silver Jubilee Medal (23 February 2009)
- Royal Brunei Armed Forces Silver Jubilee Medal (31 May 1986)
- Royal Brunei Armed Forces Golden Jubilee Medal (31 May 2011)
- Royal Brunei Armed Forces Diamond Jubilee Medal (31 May 2021)
- General Service Medal (Armed Forces)
- Long Service Medal and Good Conduct (PKLPB)

Foreign

- Indonesia:
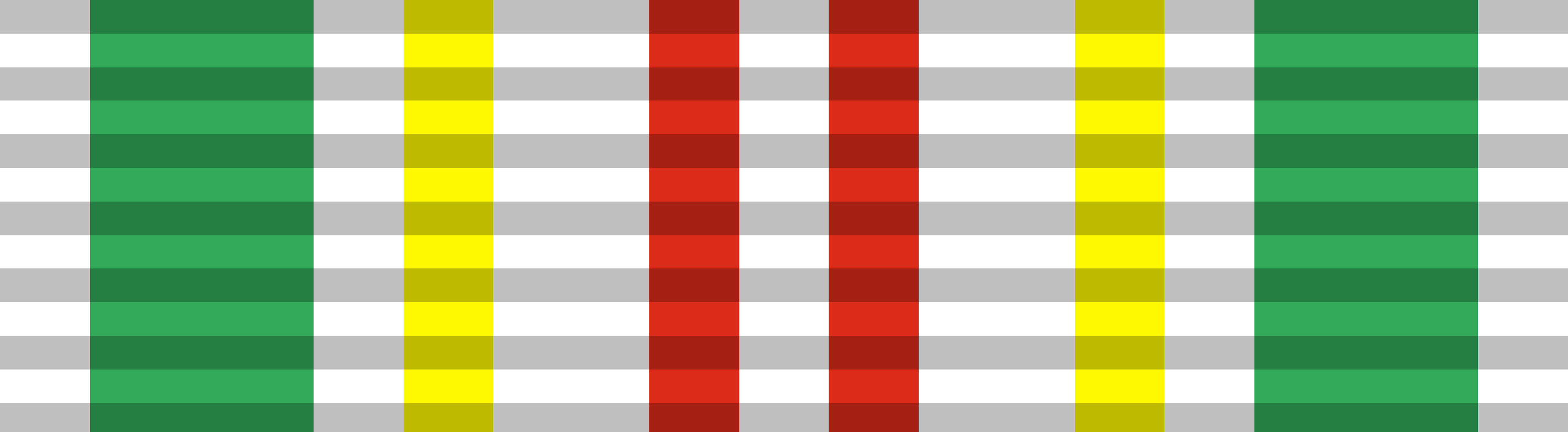
  - Bintang Yudha Dharma Utama (BYD; 26 February 2003)
- Malaysia:
  - Panglima Jasa Negara (PJN; 2000) – Datuk
  - Courageous Commander of The Most Gallant Order of Military Service (PGAT; 2001)
- Singapore:
  - Pingat Jasa Gemilang (Tentera) (PJG; 13 January 2001)
  - Darjah Utama Bakti Cemerlang (Tentera) (DUBC; 20 September 2002)

Military offices
Preceded by Shari Ahmad	6th Commander of the Royal Brunei Armed Forces; 2 April 2001 – 27 March 2003	Succeeded by Halbi Mohd Yussof
Preceded by Shari Ahmad	3rd Commander of the Royal Brunei Land Forces; 29 October 1999 – 31 January 2001	Succeeded by Halbi Mohd Yussof
