= Ariffin Abdul Wahab =

Bruneian military officer

Yang Dimuliakan Pehin Datu Indera Negara Lieutenant Colonel (Retired) Dato Paduka Ariffin Abdul Wahab DPMB SLJ PHBS PJK
- عريفين عبدالوهاب
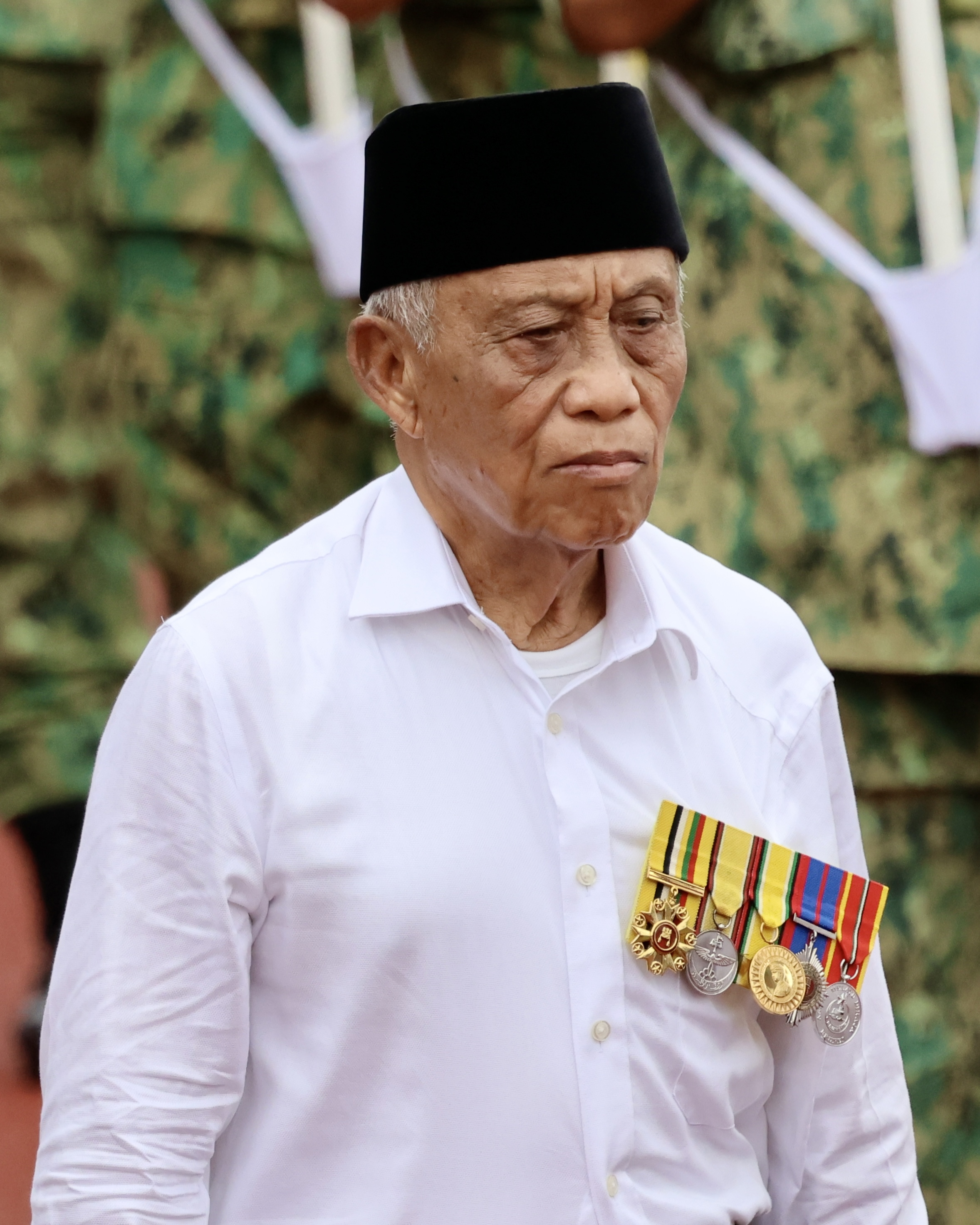
- Pehin Ariffin in 2024
- Born: Mohammad Ariffin bin Abdul Wahab; 1927–1928
- Military career
- Allegiance: Brunei
- Branch: Royal Brunei Land Force
- Service years: 1962–1979
- Rank: Lieutenant colonel
- Unit: First Battalion RBMR
- Commands: 'A' Company 'D' Company; Training Institute RBAF
- Other work: Chairman of United Motors

Mohammad Ariffin bin Haji Abdul Wahab is a Bruneian aristocrat, businessman and retired military officer, who served as the commander of the Training Institute Royal Brunei Armed Forces (TI RBAF) from 1975 to 1979. In 1976, he became one of the first two local personnel to be promoted to lieutenant colonel alongside Sulaiman Damit.

== Military career ==
At the age of 34 in 1962, Ariffin was commissioned into the support unit of the Royal Brunei Malay Regiment (RBMR) after completing his studies in Sultan Omar Ali Saifuddien College and recruit training at the Federation Military College (FMC) in Port Dickson. He would hold several position across different units serving as a platoon commander, intelligence officer, motor platoon commander and commanding officer of 'A' Company. In 1970, he was promoted to the rank of major. Mohammad Daud would be replaced by him as the commander of the training depot in May 1975. He would stay in that capacity until January 1979. In addition, he would also serve as the commanding officer of 'D' Company and training officer of First Battalion RBMR. On 27 January 1976, he was promoted to lieutenant colonel.

== Later life ==
Upon retirement, Ariffin became the primary Proton distributor in Brunei while serving as chairman of United Motors. Additionally, he is also the president of the Ex-Soldiers' Association of Brunei Darussalam (ESAB) and vice president of the Veterans Confederation of ASEAN Countries (VECONAC).

== Honours ==
Ariffin was awarded the Manteri title of Pehin Duta Indera Negara. Honours awarded to him are;

- Order of Seri Paduka Mahkota Brunei Second Class (DPMB) – Dato Paduka
- Order of Paduka Seri Laila Jasa Third Class (SLJ)
- Sultan Hassanal Bolkiah Medal First Class (PHBS)
- Meritorious Service Medal (PJK)
- Coronation Medal (1 August 1968)
- General Service Medal
- Inauguration Medal (1965)

Military offices
Preceded by Mohammad Daud	2nd Commander of the Training Institute; May 1975 – January 1979	Succeeded by Abdul Aziz Abdullah
