= Malcolm Brinded =

British businessman

Malcolm Arthur Brinded CBE (born 18 March 1953) is a British businessman, and former executive director for Upstream International and Executive Board Member of Shell and a Non-Executive Director of Network Rail.

== Career ==
Brinded graduated from the University of Cambridge with a degree in engineering in 1974, and joined Shell in The Hague. Since then he has worked for Shell in Brunei, the Netherlands, Oman and the UK. Having joined Shell in 1974 from 1998 he was managing director of Shell UK Exploration and Production, in 1999 he became Shell Country chairman in the UK, in 2002 he became a managing director of Shell, and from 2004 was managing director of Shell Transport. In October 2004 he became an executive director of Shell in charge of Exploration & Production.

Malcolm is a Fellow of both the Institution of Civil Engineers and of the Royal Academy of Engineering. He is a member of the Nigerian president's Honorary International Investor Council and a trustee of the Emirates Foundation and the International Business Leaders Forum. He is the former chairman of the Shell Foundation. On 11 October 2010, Brinded was appointed as a non-executive director of Network Rail, subject to being confirmed to the post by election by Network Rail's members at the 2011 AGM, a position he held until November 2016. Malcolm Brinded was elected as president of the Energy Institute on 4 July 2017.

== Personal life ==
Brinded is married to Carola and has three sons, the eldest of whom, Benjamin Brinded, followed in his father's footsteps to the University of Cambridge, where he became President of the Students' Union.

== Honours ==
In 2002, Brinded was awarded the honour of the CBE in the New Year's Honours List for services to the UK oil and gas industry.

- Order of the British Empire Commander (CBE) (2002)
- Order of Paduka Seri Laila Jasa Second Class (DSLJ) – Dato Seri Laila Jasa (15 July 2011)
