= Darjah Utama Bakti Cemerlang (Tentera) =

Darjah Utama Bakti Cemerlang (Tentera) (Distinguished Service Order (Military))
- Type: Order of Honour
- Awarded for: Exceptionally distinguished service or merit in senior command or staff positions
- Presented by: Singapore
- Eligibility: Members of the Singapore Armed Forces and foreign military members
- Status: Active
- Established: 1981
- Ribbon bar

Precedence
- Equivalent: Darjah Utama Bakti Cemerlang
- Next (lower): Pingat Gagah Perkasa (Tentera)

The Darjah Utama Bakti Cemerlang (Tentera) (English: Distinguished Service Order (Military)) is a decoration awarded to members of the Singapore Armed Forces and allied military members for exceptionally distinguished service or merit in senior command or staff positions.

The medal of the Darjah Utama Bakti Cemerlang (Tentera) is worn on a sash with breast star included. Recipients are entitled to use the post-nominal letters DUBC.

The Darjah Utama Bakti Cemerlang is the civil equivalent award.

== Description ==
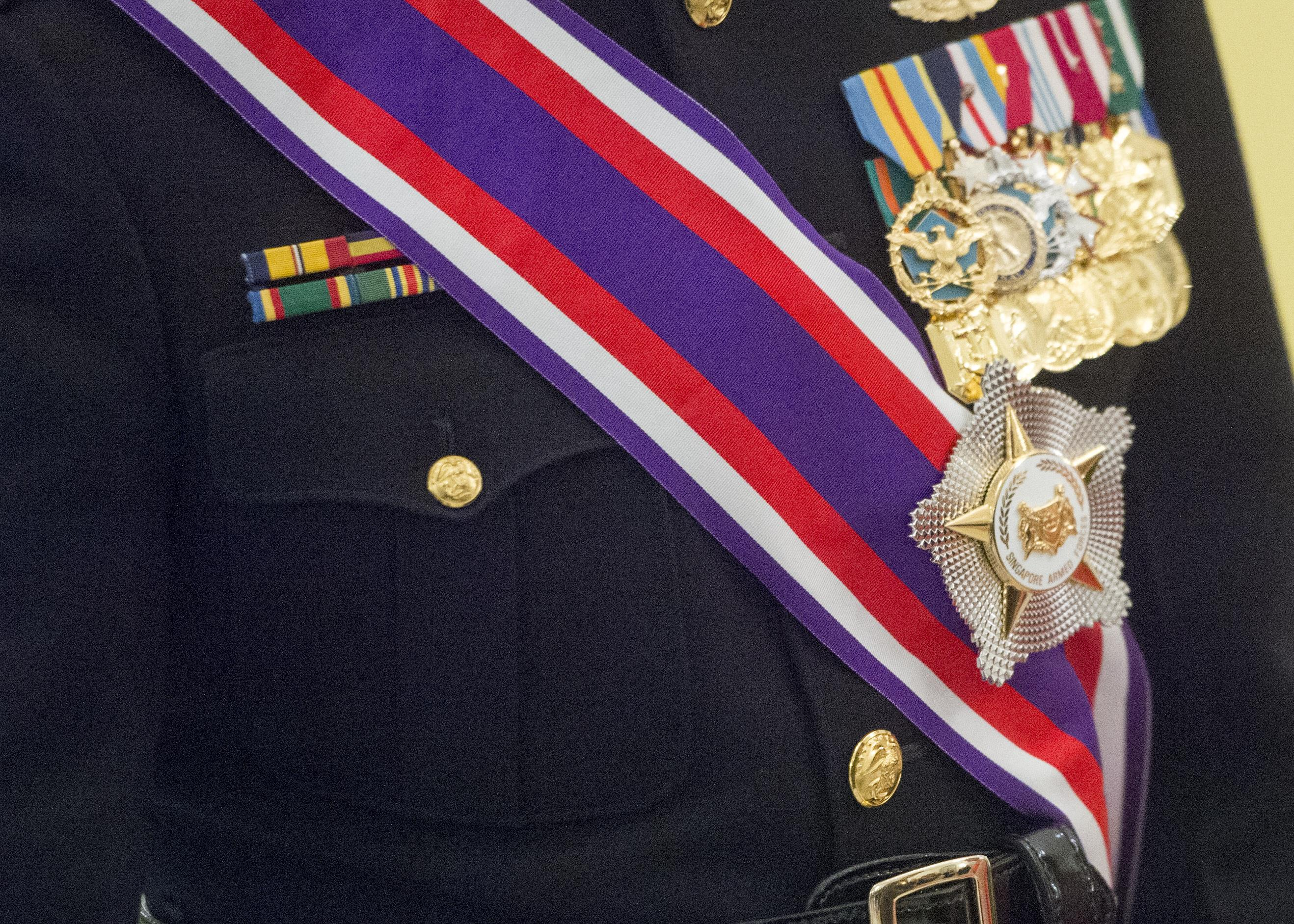
General Dunford receives the award

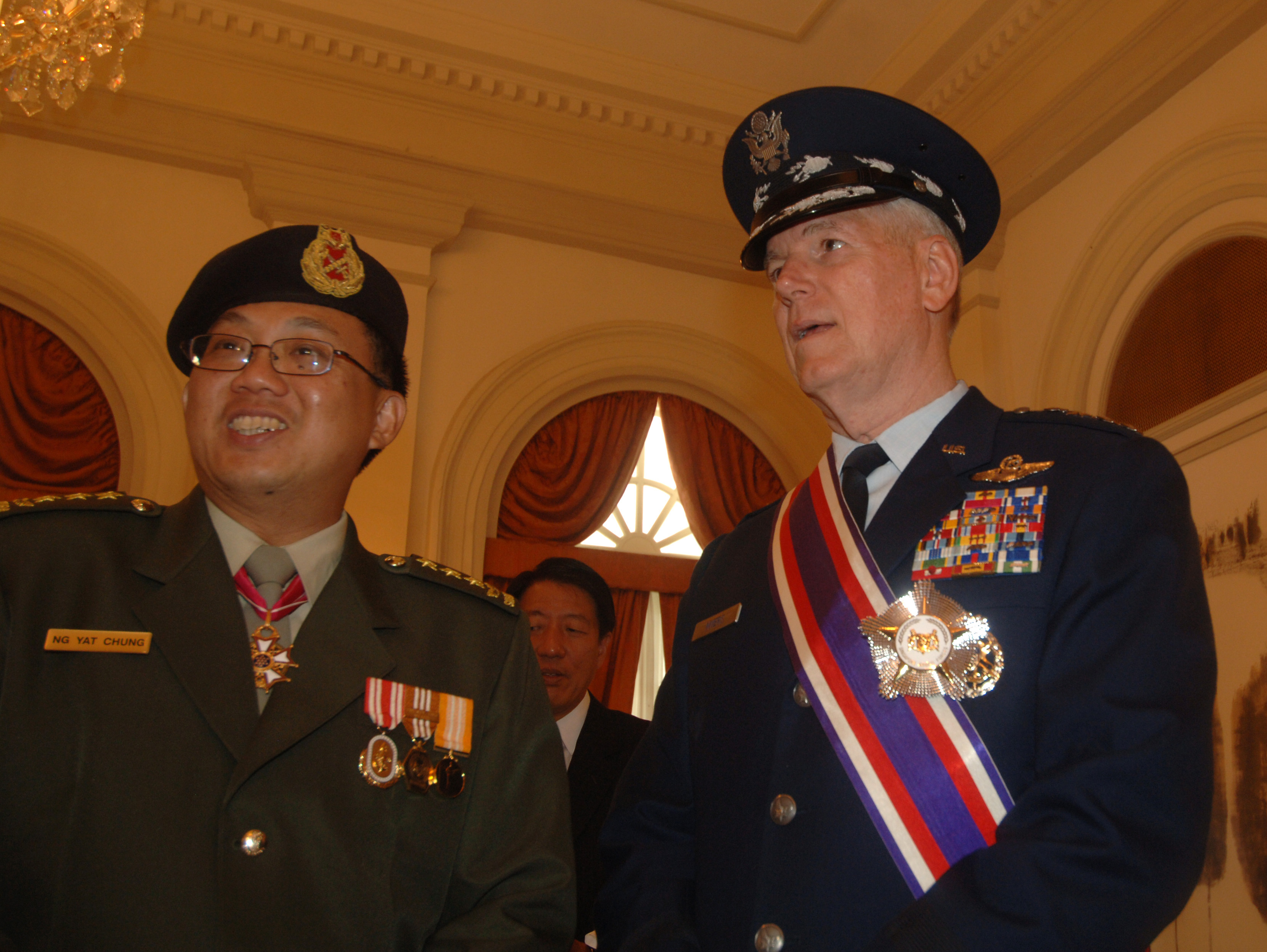
General Richard Meyers with the award

- The ribbon is purple with red and white edge stripes.

== Recipients ==
Australia

- General John Baker – Chief of Defence Force
- 2002 – Admiral Chris Barrie – Chief of Defence Force
- 2004 – General Sir Peter Cosgrove – Chief of Defence Force
- 2007 – Air Chief Marshal Sir Angus Houston – Chief of Defence Force
- 2013 – General David Hurley – Chief of Defence Force
- 2017 – Dennis Richardson – Secretary of the Department of Defence
- 2017 – Air Chief Marshal Mark Binskin – Chief of Defence Force
- 2022 – General Angus Campbell – Chief of Defence Force
- 2026 – Admiral David Johnston – Chief of Defence Force

Brunei

- 1994 – Major General Sulaiman Damit – Commander of Royal Brunei Armed Forces
- 1996 – Major General Husin Ahmad – Commander of Royal Brunei Armed Forces
- 1999 – Major General Abidin Ahmad – Commander of Royal Brunei Armed Forces
- 2002 – Major General Jaafar Abdul Aziz – Commander of Royal Brunei Armed Forces
- 2004 – Major General Halbi Mohd Yussof – Commander of Royal Brunei Armed Forces
- 2009 – General Al-Muhtadee Billah – Deputy Supreme Commander of Royal Brunei Armed Forces
- 2011 – Colonel Yasmin Umar – Deputy Minister of Defence
- 2012 – Major General Aminuddin Ihsan – Commander of Royal Brunei Armed Forces
- 2015 – Major General Mohammad Tawih – Commander of Royal Brunei Armed Forces
- 2019 – Major General Aminan Mahmud – Commander of Royal Brunei Armed Forces
- 2022 – Major General Hamzah Sahat – Commander of Royal Brunei Armed Forces
- 2024 – Major General Haszaimi Bol Hassan – Commander of Royal Brunei Armed Forces

France
- 2002 – General Jean-Pierre Kelche – Chief of Defence Force of the French Armed Forces
- 2004 – General Jean-Louis Georgelin – Chief of Defence Force of the French Armed Forces
Indonesia

- 1991 – General Try Sutrisno – Commander-in-Chief of the Indonesian National Defence Forces
- 1995 – General Feisal Tanjung – Commander-in-Chief of the Indonesian National Defence Forces
- 1999 – General Wiranto – Commander-in-Chief of the Indonesian National Defence Forces
- 2004 – General Endriartono Sutarto – Commander-in-Chief of the Indonesian National Defence Forces
- 2007 – Air Chief Marshal Djoko Suyanto – Commander-in-Chief of the Indonesian National Defence Forces
- 2009 – General Djoko Santoso – Commander-in-Chief of the Indonesian National Defence Forces
- 2012 – Admiral Agus Suhartono – Commander-in-Chief of the Indonesian National Defence Forces
- 2015 – General Moeldoko – Commander-in-Chief of the Indonesian National Defence Forces
- 2018 – General Gatot Nurmantyo – Commander-in-Chief of the Indonesian National Defence Forces
- 2021 – Air Chief Marshal Hadi Tjahjanto – Commander-in-Chief of the Indonesian National Defence Forces
- 2023 – General (Ret.) Andika Perkasa – Commander-in-Chief of the Indonesian National Defence Forces
- 2023 – General (Honorary) (Ret.) Prabowo Subianto – Minister of Defense of Indonesia
- 2024 – Admiral (Ret.) Yudo Margono – Commander-in-Chief of the Indonesian National Defence Forces
- 2026 – General Agus Subiyanto – Commander-in-Chief of the Indonesian National Defence Forces

Israel

- 1999 – General David Ivry – Head of the National Security Council of Israel and former Commander of the Israeli Air Force

Malaysia

- 2018 – General Raja Mohamed Affandi Raja Mohamed Noor – Malaysia Chief of Defence Force
- 2022 - General Affendi Buang - Chief of the Malaysian Armed Forces
- 2025 - General Mohammad Ab Rahman - Former Chief of the Malaysian Armed Forces

New Zealand

- 2006 – Air Marshal Sir Bruce Ferguson – New Zealand Chief of Defence Force
- 2011 – Lieutenant General Sir Jerry Mateparae – New Zealand Chief of Defence Force and Governor-General of New Zealand

Thailand

- 1988 – General Chavalit Yongchaiyudh – Supreme Commander of the Royal Thai Armed Forces
- 1991 – General Sunthorn Kongsompong – Supreme Commander of the Royal Thai Armed Forces
- 2003 – General Surayud Chulanont – Supreme Commander of the Royal Thai Armed Forces
- 2005 – General Chaiyasit Shinawatra – Supreme Commander of the Royal Thai Armed Forces
- 2007 – General Ruangroj Mahasaranon – Supreme Commander of the Royal Thai Armed Forces
- 2015 – General Worapong Sanganetra – Chief of Defence Forces of the Royal Thai Armed Forces
- 2016 – General Sommai Kaotira – Chief of Defence Forces of the Royal Thai Armed Forces
- 2017 – General Surapong Suwana-adth – Chief of Defence Forces of the Royal Thai Armed Forces
- 2018 – General Thanchaiyan Srisuwan – Chief of Defence Forces of the Royal Thai Armed Forces
- 2022 – General Chalermpol Srisawat – Chief of Defence Forces of the Royal Thai Armed Forces

United States

- 2005 – Air Force General Richard Myers – Chairman of the Joint Chiefs of Staff of the Military of the United States
- 2017 – Marine Corps General Joe Dunford – Chairman of the Joint Chiefs of Staff of the Military of the United States

== See also ==
- Category: Recipients of the Darjah Utama Bakti Cemerlang (Tentera)
- Category: Recipients of the Darjah Utama Bakti Cemerlang
