= Order of Paduka Keberanian Laila Terbilang =

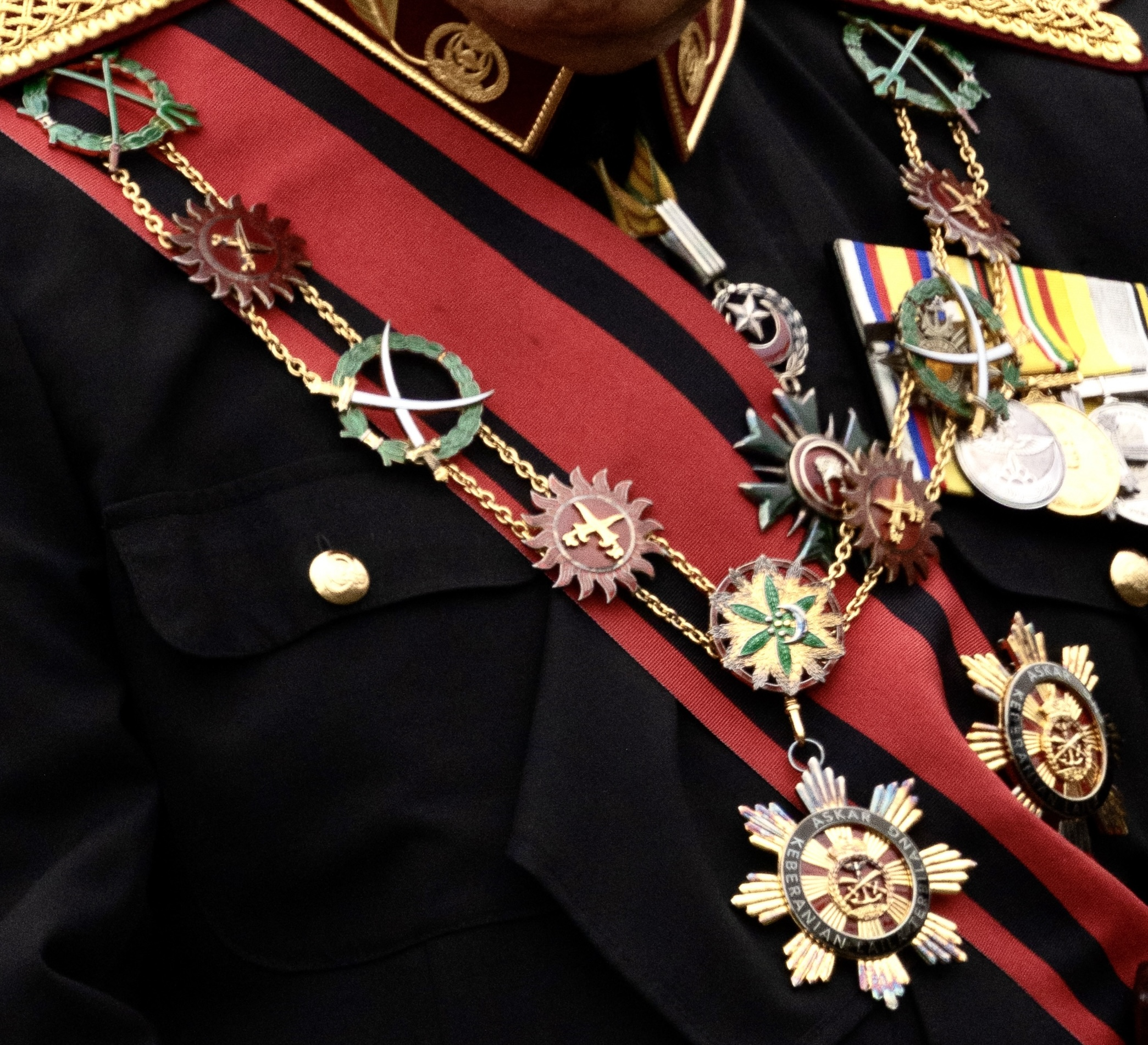
- DPKT neck decoration

Awarded by the Sultan of Brunei
- Type: Military decoration
- Established: 1968
- Country: Brunei
- Awarded for: For acts of military gallantry
- Status: Currently constituted
- Sovereign: Hassanal Bolkiah
- Grades: Grand Commander (DPKT); Commander (DLKT); Companion (DKT)

Precedence
- Next (higher): Order of Paduka Laila Jasa Keberanian Gemilang
- Next (lower): Order of Pahlawan Negara Brunei
- (DPKT) (DKLT) (DKT)

The Most Exalted Order of Paduka Keberanian Laila Terbilang (Malay: Darjah Paduka Keberanian Laila Terbilang Yang Amat Gemilang), also translated as The Most Exalted Order of Famous Valour, is an order of Brunei. It was established on 1 August 1968 by Sultan Hassanal Bolkiah.

== Current classes ==
The three classes of appointment to the Order are, from highest grade to lowest grade:

Class	Post-nominal	Title	Ribbon bar
Grand Commander	DPKT	Dato Paduka Seri	
Commander	DKLT	Dato Laila	
Companion	DKT	–	

== Notable recipients ==
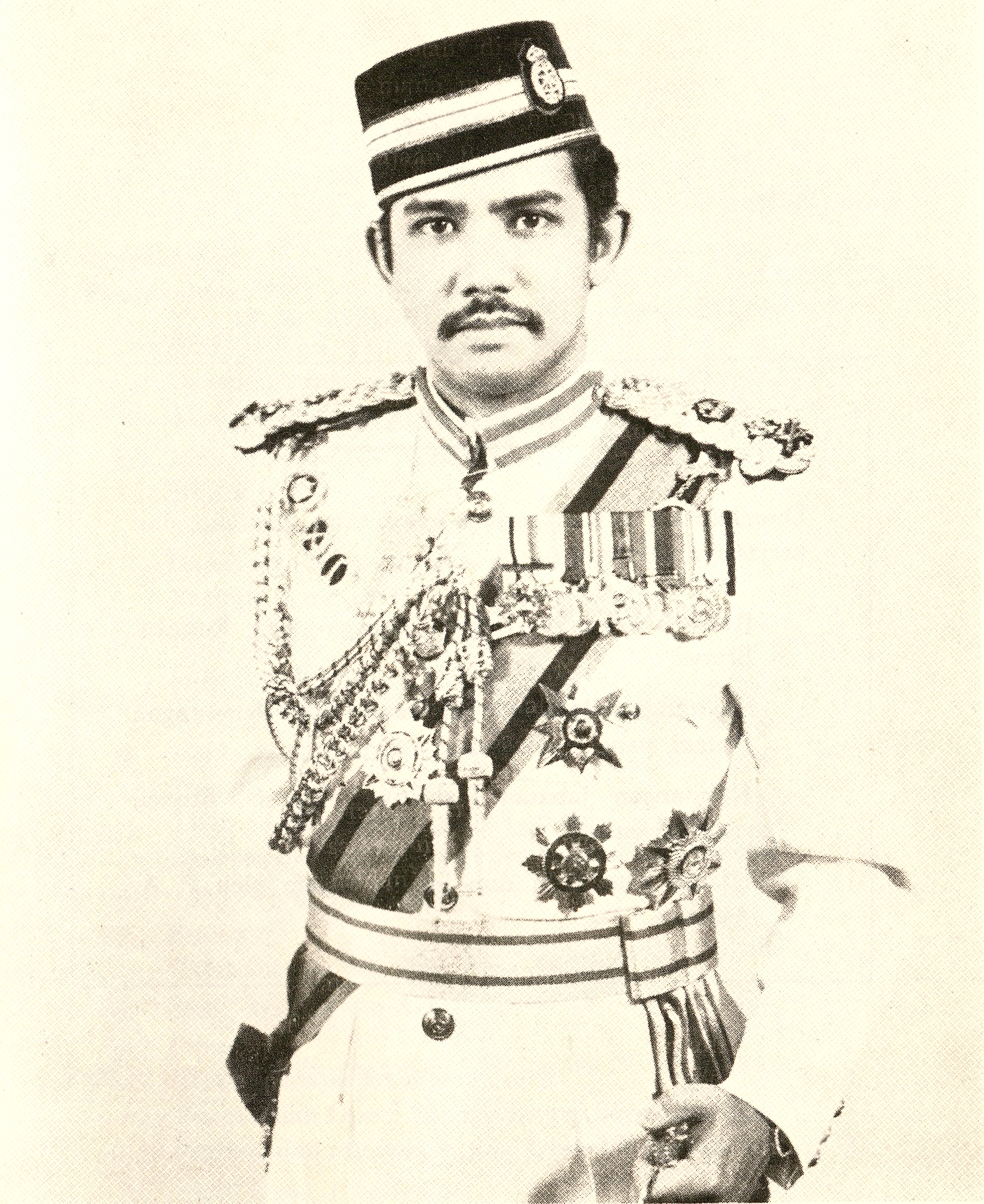
Sultan Hassanal Bolkiah wearing his sash, c. 1971

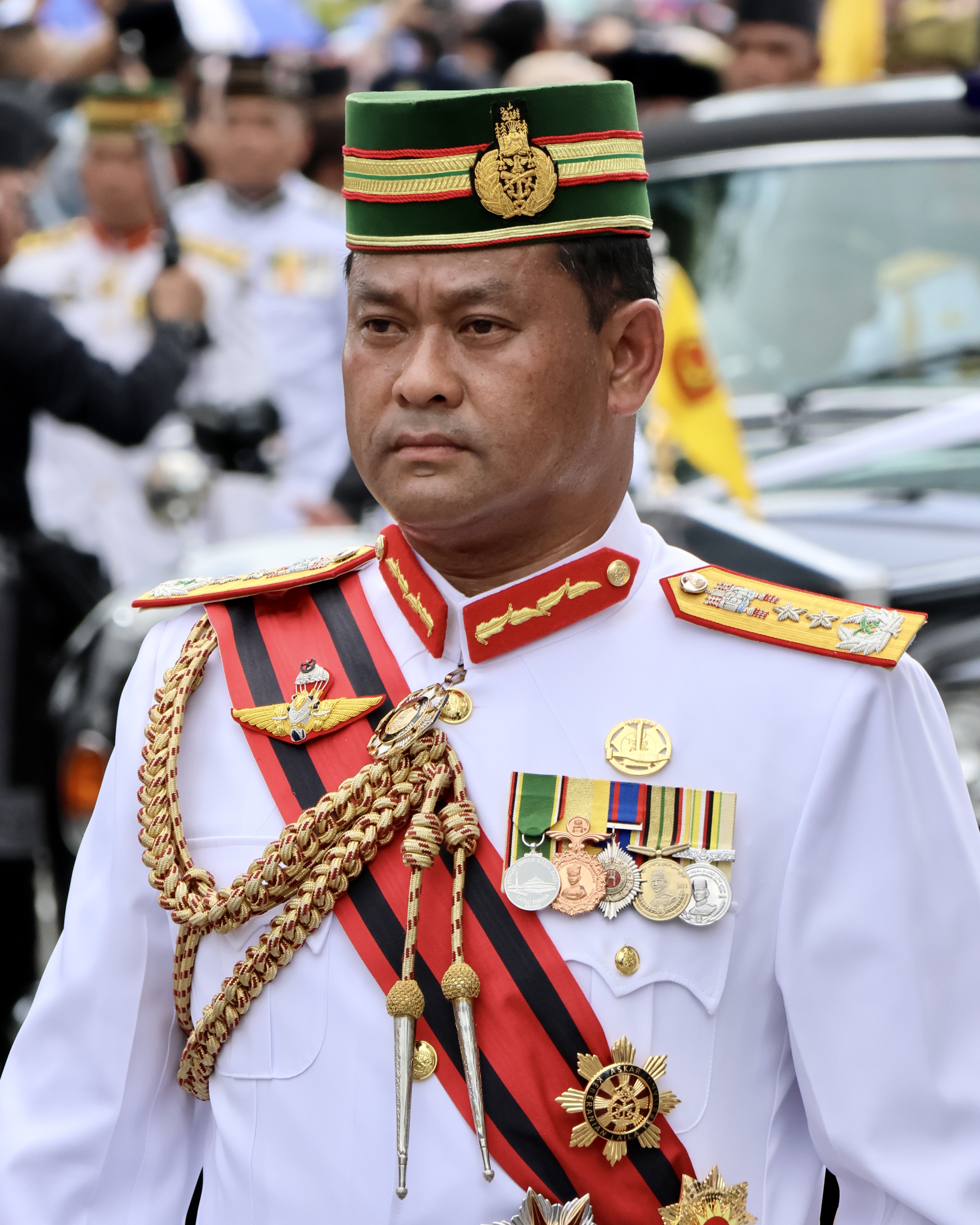
- Major General Haszaimi wearing his sash in 2024
  Brunei Darussalam :
  - Sultan Hassanal Bolkiah
  - Sultan Omar Ali Saifuddien III
  - Crown Prince Al-Muhtadee Billah
  - Prince Abdul Mateen
  - Mariam Abdul Aziz
  - Hasrin Sabtu, Commissioner of Police
  - Zainuddin Jalani, Commissioner of Police
  - Ya'akub Zainal, Commissioner of Police
  - Jammy Shah Al-Islam, Commissioner of Police
  - Bahrin Mohd Noor, Commissioner of Police
  - Muhammad Irwan Hambali, Commissioner of Police
  - Sulaiman Alidin, Deputy Commissioner of Police
  - Brigadier General Saifulrizal, Commander of the Royal Brunei Land Force
  - Brigadier General Alirupendi, Chief of Staff of the Joint Forces Headquarters
  - Major General Jaafar Abdul Aziz, Commander of the Royal Brunei Armed Forces
  - Major General Shari Ahmad, Commander of the Royal Brunei Armed Forces
  - Major General Tawih Abdullah, Commander of the Royal Brunei Armed Forces
  - Major General Pengiran Aminan, Commander of the Royal Brunei Armed Forces
  - Major General Sulaiman Damit, Commander of the Royal Brunei Armed Forces
  - Major General Aminuddin Ihsan, Commander of the Royal Brunei Armed Forces
  - Major General Haszaimi Bol Hassan, Commander of the Royal Brunei Armed Forces
- Singapore :
  - Lieutenant General Winston Choo, Chief of Defence Force of the Singapore Armed Forces
  - Lieutenant General Ng Chee Meng, Chief of Defence Force of the Singapore Armed Forces
  - Lieutenant General Neo Kian Hong, Chief of Defence Force of the Singapore Armed Forces
  - Lieutenant General Ng Yat Chung, Chief of Defence Force of the Singapore Armed Forces
  - Lieutenant General Desmond Kuek, Chief of Defence Force of the Singapore Armed Forces
  - Lieutenant General Perry Lim, Chief of Defence Force of the Singapore Armed Forces
  - Lieutenant General Melvyn Ong, Chief of Defence Force of the Singapore Armed Forces
  - Vice Admiral Aaron Beng, Chief of Defence Force of the Singapore Armed Forces
- Thailand :
  - General Songkitti Jaggabatara, Chief of Defence Forces
  - General Thanchaiyan Srisuwan, Chief of Defence Forces
  - General Chalermpol Srisawat, Chief of Defence Forces
  - General Songwit Noonpackdee, Chief of Defence Forces
- Indonesia :

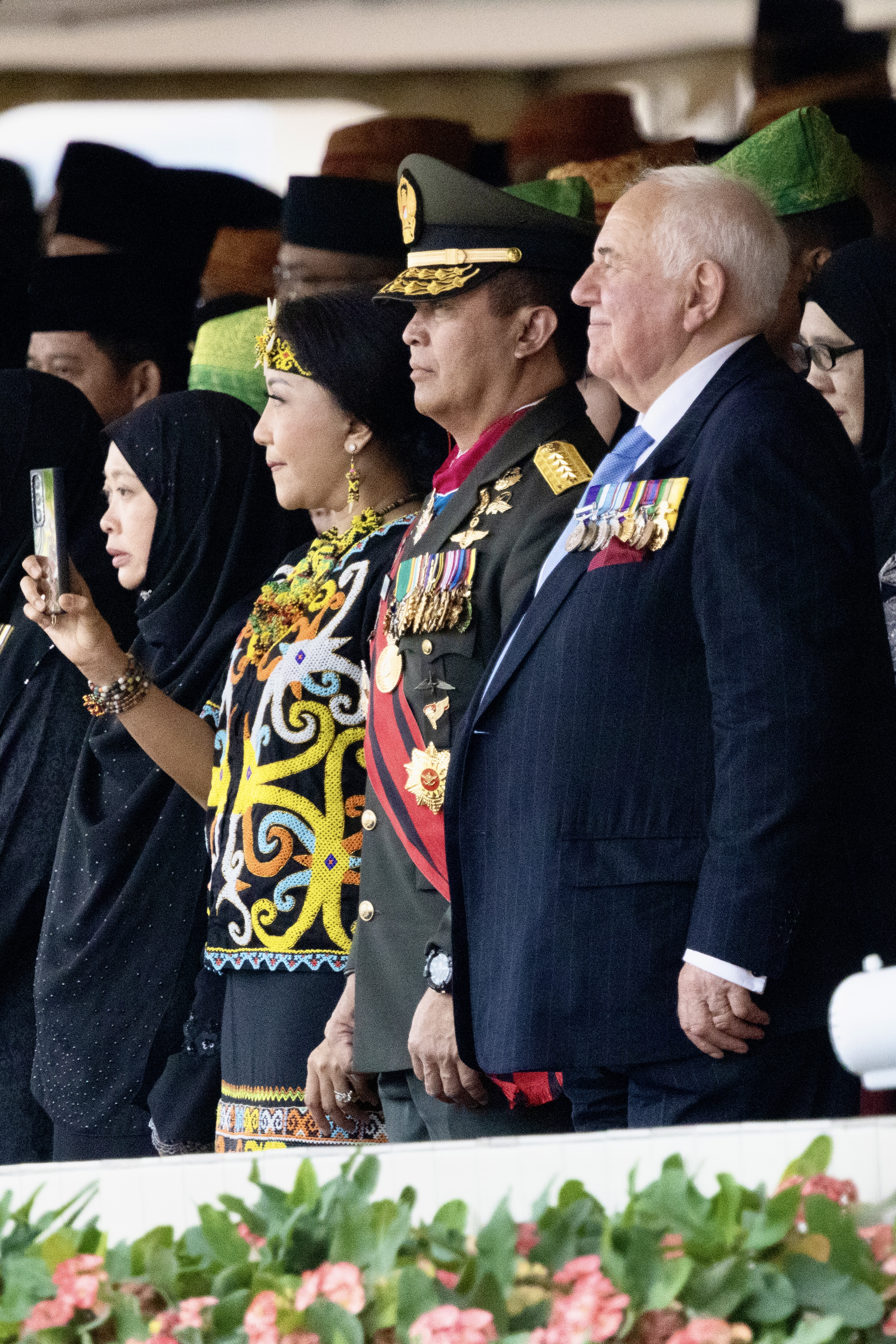
General Andika (middle) wearing his sash in 2024

  - General L.B. Moerdani, Commander of the Indonesian National Armed Forces
  - General Try Sutrisno, Commander of the Indonesian National Armed Forces
  - General Feisal Tanjung, Commander of the Indonesian National Armed Forces
  - General Wiranto, Commander of the Indonesian National Armed Forces
  - Admiral Widodo Adi Sutjipto, Commander of the Indonesian National Armed Forces
  - General Endriartono Sutarto, Commander of the Indonesian National Armed Forces
  - Air Chief Marshal Djoko Suyanto, Commander of the Indonesian National Armed Forces
  - General Djoko Santoso, Commander of the Indonesian National Armed Forces
  - Admiral Agus Suhartono, Commander of the Indonesian National Armed Forces
  - General Moeldoko, Commander of the Indonesian National Armed Forces
  - General Gatot Nurmantyo, Commander of the Indonesian National Armed Forces
  - Police-General Tito Karnavian, Chief of the Indonesian National Police
  - Air Chief Marshal Hadi Tjahjanto, Commander of the Indonesian National Armed Forces
  - General Andika Perkasa, Commander of the Indonesian National Armed Forces
- Malaysia :
  - General Ismail Omar, Chief of Defence Force of Malaysia
  - General Mohd Zahidi Zainuddin, Chief of Defence Force of Malaysia
  - General Abdul Aziz Zainal, Chief of Defence Force of Malaysia
  - Admiral Mohd Anwar Mohd Nor, Chief of Defence Force of Malaysia
  - General Zulkifeli Mohd Zin, Chief of Defence Force of Malaysia
  - Inspector-General Police Khalid Abu Bakar, Inspector-General of Police of Malaysia
  - General Raja Mohamed Affandi, Chief of Defence Forces of Malaysia
  - General Zulkifli Zainal Abidin Chief of Defence Force of Malaysia
  - General Affendi Buang, Chief of Defence Force of Malaysia
  - General Azizan Ariffin, Chief of Defence Forces of Malaysia
