= Brunei–Indonesia relations =

- Brunei: Indonesia

Diplomatic mission
- Embassy: Embassy

Envoy
- Ambassador Abdul Razak Abdul Kadir: Ambassador Achmad Ubaedillah

Brunei Darussalam and Indonesia established diplomatic relations in 1984. Since then, both countries enjoy warm and friendly relations. Brunei has an embassy in Jakarta, while Indonesia has an embassy in Bandar Seri Begawan. Indonesia and Brunei don't share direct land borders. Since diplomatic relations were established back in 1984, relations between the two countries overall progressed well, and both sides continued to enjoy strong ties in a wide spectrum of co-operations; including trade and investment, tourism, agriculture, marine and fisheries, health, defence, transnational crimes, education, youth, culture and people-to-people contacts.

Both Brunei and Indonesia have many common characteristic traits, these include common frames of reference in history, culture and religion. Their national languages; Indonesian language and Malay language are closely related. The majority of the population of both nations were of Austronesian ancestry or of the Malay race, with significant Malay culture shared among them. Both nations are Muslim majority countries, members of ASEAN and APEC, and also members of the Non-aligned Movement, and Organisation of Islamic Cooperation.

== History ==
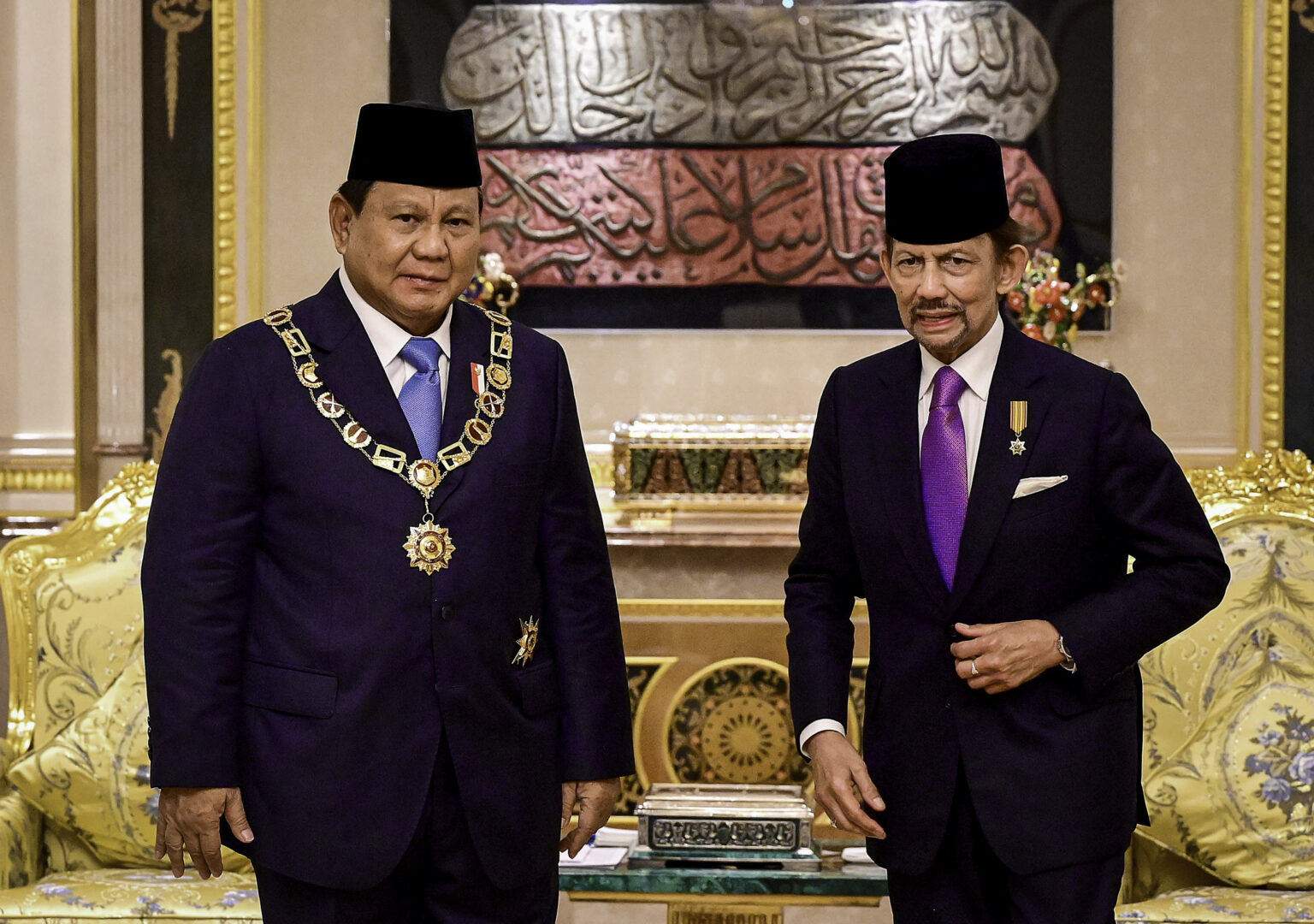
Indonesian President Prabowo Subianto and Sultan Hassanal Bolkiah of Brunei at the Istana Nurul Iman

Relations between Indonesia and Brunei have been established since the 14th century or perhaps earlier. The Nagarakretagama Javanese poem dated from 1365 CE mentioned Barune (Brunei) in canto 14 as one of Majapahit overseas vassal states. The relations between Brunei and the rest of Indonesian Archipelago have perhaps been established earlier during the era of Srivijayan Empire.

During the European colonial era, Indonesia fell under Dutch possession as the Dutch East Indies, while Brunei together with Singapore and Malaysia fell under control of the British Empire. In the 1960s, Indonesia and Brunei were indirectly locked in military tension through the Konfrontasi, where Indonesia, opposed to the formation of Malaysia, dispatched troops to Sarawak, in North Borneo, including Brunei.

The Republic of Indonesia established diplomatic relations with Brunei Darussalam on 1 January 1984. Brunei Darussalam was recognised by Jakarta on independence in 1984, with Indonesia dropping any claims on the Sultanate in the process. Indonesia also supported Brunei membership to ASEAN in 1984.

On 14 May 2025, Indonesian President Prabowo Subianto visited Brunei. At the Istana Nurul Iman, he held a bilateral meeting with Sultan Hassanal Bolkiah discussing strategic areas of cooperation. Prabowo was given the honorary title of the Family Order of Laila Utama by Hassanal Bolkiah in recognition of his efforts to improve bilateral ties.

== Economy and trade ==
Brunei has been a popular destination for Indonesian workers. As per 31 August 2012, there were around 58,000 Indonesian citizens staying and working in Brunei. Bilateral trade volume in 2011 reached around US$1.1 billion, coupled with around 3,500 Indonesian products in Brunei's market. In line with Brunei's economic diversication policy, the two countries are seeking to enhance co-operation in the field of marine and fisheries, as well as in the health sector.
