= Order of Paduka Seri Laila Jasa =

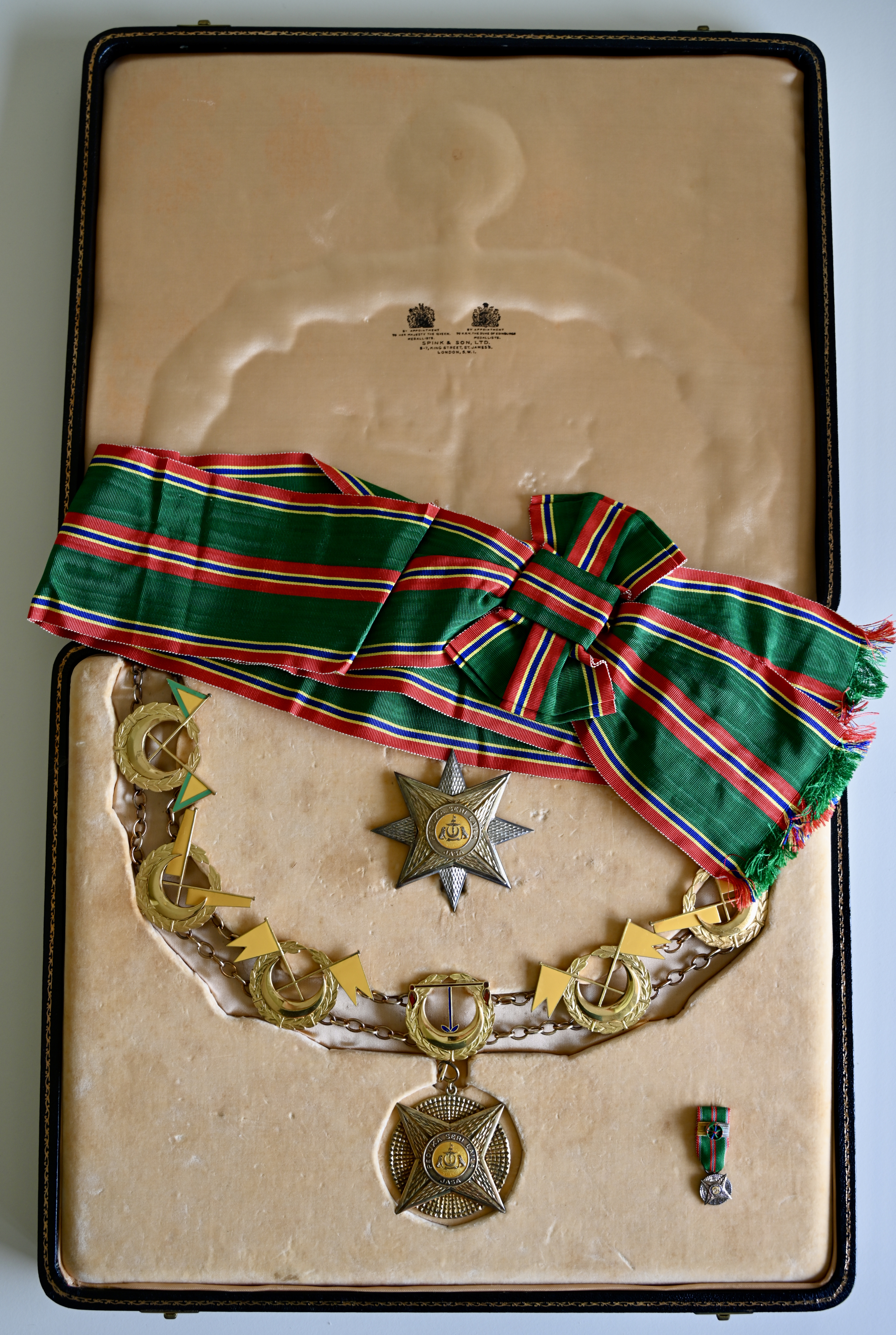
- PSLJ neck decoration and sash

Awarded by the Sultan of Brunei
- Type: Order of chivalry
- Established: 1964
- Country: Brunei
- Awarded for: For meritorious and faithful services
- Status: Currently constituted
- Sovereign: Hassanal Bolkiah
- Grades: Grand Commander (PSLJ); Commander (DSLJ); Companion (SLJ)

Precedence
- Next (higher): Order of Setia Negara Brunei
- Next (lower): Order of Seri Paduka Mahkota Brunei
- (PSLJ) (DSLJ) (SLJ)

The Most Distinguished Order of Paduka Seri Laila Jasa (Malay: Darjah Paduka Seri Laila Jasa Yang Amat Berjasa), also translated as The Most Distinguished Order of Merit of Brunei, is an order of Brunei. It was established in February 1964 by Sultan Omar Ali Saifuddien III.

== Current classes ==
The three classes of appointment to the Order are, from highest grade to lowest grade:

Class	Post-nominal	Title	Ribbon bar
Grand Commander	PSLJ	Dato Paduka Seri Laila Jasa	
Commander	DSLJ	Dato Seri Laila Jasa	
Companion	SLJ	–	

== Description ==
The first class included 14 medallions measuring 1,100 millimetres (43 in) in silver, gold, and enamel, along with the badge appendant, measuring 60 millimetres (2.4 in) in silver, gold, and enamel; the star, measuring 83 millimetres (3.3 in) in silver, gold, and enamel, with a gold retaining pin and the maker's cartouche on the reverse, and presented in a fitted leather case with a miniature award.

The pre-1984 first class consisted of a badge and star with two lions on them. The second class adopted the Bruneian crown in place of lions when Brunei gained official independence from Britain in 1984.

== Recipients ==
=== First Class ===
- Unknown – Hassanal Bolkiah – Sultan of Brunei
- Unknown – Omar Ali Saifuddien III – Sultan of Brunei
- Unknown – Pengiran Anak Kemaluddin Al-Haj – Speaker of Legislative Council
- Unknown – Marianne E. Lloyd-Dolbey – Personal Secretary to Sultan Omar Ali Saifuddien III
- Unknown – Pengiran Umar – Commissioner of Police
- Unknown – Pengiran Muhammad Ali – Deputy Menteri Besar
- Unknown – Ahmad Wally Skinner – Deputy Minister of Finance
- 1966 – Sir Stephen Luke – Senior Crown Agent
- 2002 – Ghazali Shafie – Malaysian Minister of Foreign Affairs
- 2023 – Tengah Ali Hasan – Deputy Premier of Sarawak

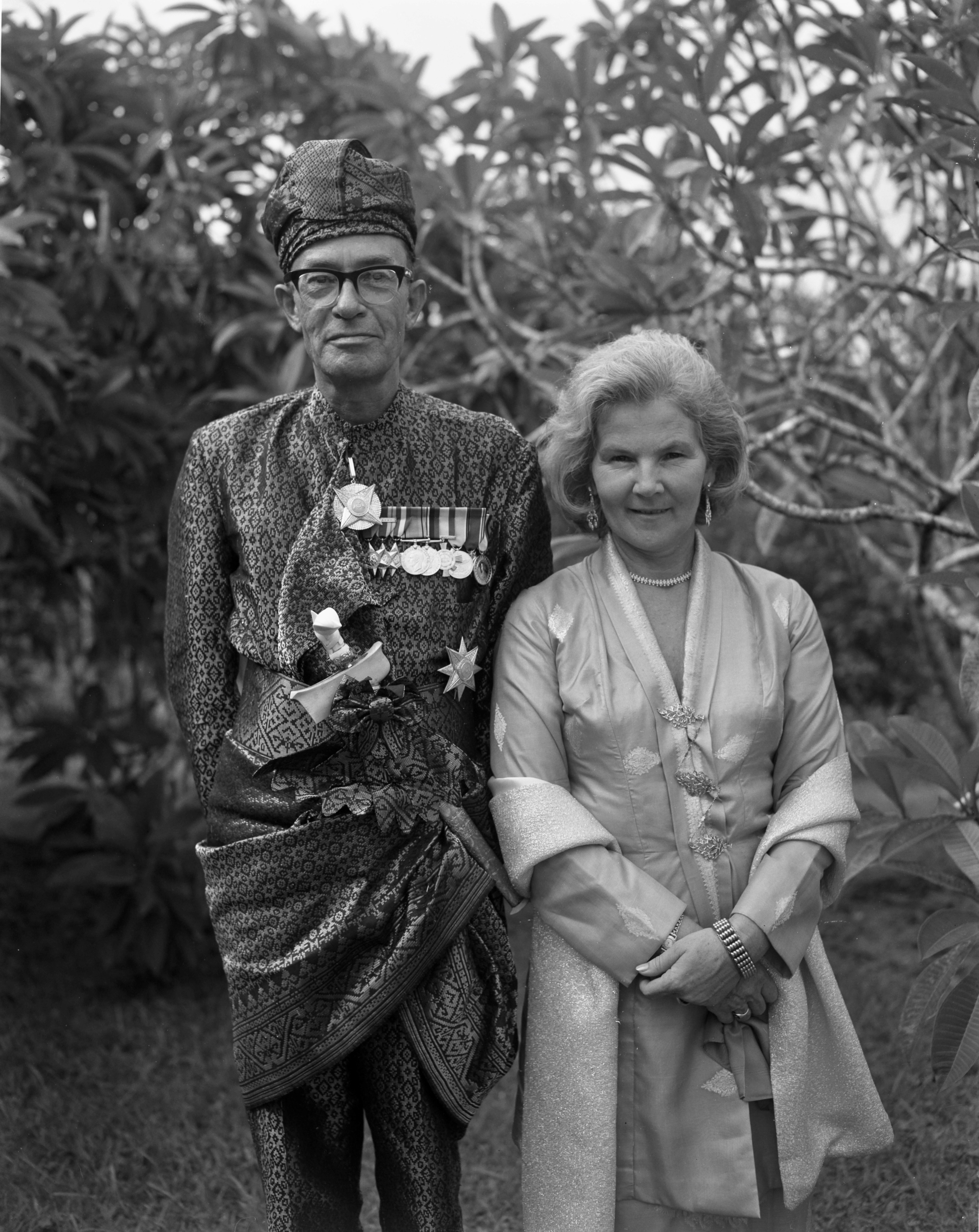
Dato and Datin Lloyd-Dolbey with their respective orders in 1967

=== Second Class ===
- Unknown – Major General Husin – Commander of the Royal Brunei Armed Forces
- Unknown – Major General Jaafar – Commander of the Royal Brunei Armed Forces
- Unknown – Lieutenant Colonel Musa – Commander of the Training Institute
- Unknown – Colonel Jocklin – Commanding Officer of Air Wing ABDB
- Unknown – Pengiran Anak Besar – Nobility
- Unknown – Zakaria Sulaiman – Minister of Communications
- Unknown – Major General Pengiran Ibnu Basit – Commander of the Royal Brunei Navy
- Unknown – Ahmad Jumat – Minister of Culture, Youth and Sports
- Unknown – Raoul Teesdale Lloyd-Dolbey – British officer
- Unknown – Ismail Omar Abdul Aziz – State Mufti
- Unknown – James Richard Henry Burns – Commissioner of Police
- Unknown – Ya'akub Zainal – Commissioner of Police
- 1966 – Alfred Suenson-Taylor – head of investment banking Asia Pacific region
- 1966 – Daniel Knox – former governor of the Bahamas
- 1966 – William Henry Doughty – oldest European and the longest resident of Brunei
- 1967 – Abdul Rahman Taha – Member of Privy Council
- 1968 – William lan Glass – Controller of Civil Aviation and Establishment Officer
- 1969 – Zain Serudin – Minister of Religious Affairs
- 1969 – Malcolm MacInnes – Director of Education
- 1969 – P. A. Coates – Member of Privy Council
- 1969 – T. E. Owen – Superintendent of Police
- 1969 – William John Peel – British Resident to Brunei
- 1971 – John Vivian – British aristocrat
- 1978 – Yussof Mohd Limbang – Member of Privy Council
- 1979 – Lukan Uking – Member of the Legislative Council
- 1983 – Abdul Aziz Juned – State Mufti
- 1986 – Pengiran Anak Puteh – Diplomat and nobility
- 1989 – Abu Bakar Apong – Minister of Home Affairs
- 2003 – Anwarullah Shafiullah – Member Islamic Law Expert at the Ministry of Religious Affairs
- 2010 – Rodman R. Bundy – Partner in Eversheds litigation
- 2010 – Alan Vaughan Lowe – Chichele Professor of Public International Law in the University of Oxford
- 2011 – Peter Voser – CEO of Royal Dutch Shell
- 2011 – Malcolm Brinded – Executive Board Member of Royal Dutch Shell
- 2011 – Babu Sukamaran – Medical Director of Pantai Jerudong Specialist Centre
- 2011 – Uta Meyding-Lamade – Help set up the JPMC Neuroscience Stroke and Rehabilitation Centre
- 2012 – Shamsul Azhar Abbas – President and CEO of Petronas
- 2012 – Ken Kobayashi – CEO of Mitsubishi Corporation
- 2012 – Maliakel John Alexander – Gastroenterology Specialist
- 2014 – Ahmad Fuzi Abdul Razak – Secretary General of the Ministry of Foreign Affairs Malaysia
- 2014 – Rastam Mohd Isa – Secretary General of the Ministry of Foreign Affairs Malaysia
- 2018 – James Kerr Findlay – Commissioner of the Supreme Court

=== Third Class ===
- Unknown – Abdul Rahman Taib – Speaker of Legislative Council
- Unknown – Salleh Masri – Member of Legislative Council
- Unknown – Ali Mohammad Daud – Deputy Minister of Foreign Affairs
- Unknown – Hong Kok Tin – Member of the Legislative Council
- Unknown – Colonel Abdu'r Rahmani – Commander of the Royal Brunei Land Forces
- Unknown – Colonel Kefli – Commander of the Royal Brunei Navy
- Unknown – Lieutenant Colonel Mohammad Ariffin – Commander of the Training Institute
- Unknown – Pengiran Asmalee – Diplomat
- 1969 – Judin Asar – Clerk to the Legislative Council
- 1969 – G. R. Crowhurst – Music Director of Royal Brunei Police Force Band
- 1969 – Damit Metussin – Nobility
- 1969 – Garaham Salleck – Qantas employee to manage the travel needs for Sultan Omar Ali Saifuddien III
- 1969 – H. J. R. Bennett – Head of Prison Department
- 2011 – Shaukat Zinna – Medical practitioner
- 2013 – Haroon Manadath Pareed Pillay – Specialist and Head of Department of Neurosurgery at RIPAS Hospital
- 2014 – Meyyappan Nadarajan Thevar – Contributions to the RBAF Command and Staff College

=== Former recipients ===
- Unknown – Nawawi Taha – Personal and Confidential Secretary to Sultan Hassanal Bolkiah
