= Order of precedence in Brunei =

Relative preeminence of officials for ceremonial purposes

The Bruneian order of precedence is a nominal and symbolic hierarchy of important positions within the Government of Brunei. It has no legal standing but is used to dictate ceremonial protocol at events of a national nature. The order of precedence is determined by the Sultan on the recommendation of National Ceremonies Department.

== Details ==
The following lists precedence of offices and their holders as of August 2026.

Rank	Position	Incumbent (as of August 2026)
*	Sultan	Hassanal Bolkiah
*	Queen (Raja Isteri)	Pengiran Anak Saleha
*	Crown Prince (Duli Pengiran Muda Mahkota)	Al-Muhtadee Billah
*	Crown Princess	Pengiran Anak Sarah
1	Members of the Royal Family	Sultan's sons (Pengiran Muda) (and includes their spouse and children): Abdul Azim; Abdul Malik; Abdul Mateen; Abdul Wakeel; Sultan's daughters (Pengiran Anak Puteri) (and includes their spouse and children): Rashidah Saadatul Bolkiah; Mutawakkilah Hayatul Bolkiah; Majeedah Nurul Bolkiah; Hafizah Sururul Bolkiah; Azemah Ni'matul Bolkiah; Fadzillah Lubabul Bolkiah; Ameerah Wardatul Bolkiah
1	Members of the Royal Family	Sultan's brothers (Pengiran Muda) (and includes their spouse): Pengiran Perdana Wazir, Mohamed Bolkiah; Pengiran Bendahara, Sufri Bolkiah; Pengiran Digadong, Jefri Bolkiah; Sultan's sisters (Pengiran Anak Puteri) (and includes their spouse): Masna; Nor'ain; Amal Umi Kalthum Al-Islam; Amal Rakiah; Amal Nasibah; Amal Jefriah
2	Cheteria 4	Pengiran Indera Setia Diraja, Idris Abdul Kahar; Pengiran Maharaja Setia Laila Diraja, Abdul Rahim Kemaludin; Pengiran Sanggamara Diraja, Maj. Gen. (Rtd.) Ibnu Basit Apong
3	His Majesty's Special Adviser	Awang Isa Awang Ibrahim
4	Speaker of the Legislative Council	Abdul Rahman Mohamed Talib
5	Ministers	Pehin Datu Lailaraja Maj. Gen. (Rtd.) Halbi Mohammad Yusof, Minister at the Prime Minister's Office / Second Minister of Defence (also Coordinating Minister for National Security); Sufian Haji Sabtu, Minister in Prime Minister's Office (Security & Law) / Director of Internal Security Department; Nazmi Mohamad, Minister at the Prime Minister's Office (Public Service Governance); Azmi Mohd Hanifah, Minister at the Prime Minister's Office (Upstream and Downstream Energy); Ahmaddin Abdul Rahman, Minister of Home Affairs (also Coordinating Minister for Social and Manpower Policies); Abdul Manaf Metussin, Minister of Primary Resources and Tourism (also Coordinating Minister for Economic Policies); Mohd. Amin Liew Abdullah, Second Minister of Finance; Pengiran Tashim Hassan, Minister of Religious Affairs; Dr. Mohd. Isham Jaafar, Minister of Health; Erywan Mohd. Yusof, Second Minister of Foreign Affairs; Juanda Abdul Rashid, Minister of Development; Romaizah Salleh, Minister of Education; Mohd Riza Yunos, Minister of Transport and Info-communication; Pengiran Shamhary Mustapha, Minister of Culture, Youth and Sports
6	Mufti	Abdul Aziz Juned
7	His Majesty's Private and Confidential Secretary	Hamiddon Ibrahim
8	Attorney-General	Hashimah Mohammed Taib
9	Other Pengiran Cheteria	Refer here
10	Grandchildren of Sultan Omar Ali Saifudden	Refer to National Ceremonies Department
11	Distinguished persons	Determined by the Sultan
12	Chief Syarie Judge	Justice Salim Besar
13	Chief Justice of the Supreme Court	Justice Steven Chong
14	Privy Councillors	Pengiran Abdul Aziz Pengiran Abu Bakar (appears after Princess Masna as her spouse; he is also Pengiran Lela Cheteria, the Lead Cheteria); ~~Awang Mohd. Jamil al-Sufri Haji Umar~~ (died; 2021); Pengiran Idris Pengiran Abdul Kahar (appears above as Pengiran Indera Setia Diraja); ~~Pengiran Umar Pengiran Apong~~ (died; 2023); Maj. Gen. Pengiran Ibnu Basit Pengiran Apong (Rtd.) (appears above as Pengiran Sanggamara Diraja); ~~Awang Mohd. Nawawi Awang Mohd. Taha~~ (revoked, 2023); Pengiran Abdul Rahim Pengiran Kemaluddin (appears after Princess Rashidah Sa'adatul Bolkiah as her spouse); ~~Awang Abdul Hamid Bakal~~ (died; 2024); Awang Abdul Aziz Awang Umar; ~~Awang Mohd. Zain Serudin~~ (died; 2025); Awang Yahya Ibrahim; Abdul Wahab Md. Said
15	Deputy Ministers	
16	Members of the Succession Council	Pengiran Idris Abdul Kahar, Head of Adat Istiadat (appears above as Pengiran Indera Setia Diraja); Pehin Abdul Aziz Juned, State Mufti (appears above as Mufti); Pengiran Ibnu Basit Apong (appears above as Pengiran Sanggamara Diraja); Pehin Abdul Rahman Taib (appears above as Speaker of the Legislative Council); Pehin Halbi Mohammad Yusof (appears above as Minister); Pehin Salim Besar (appears above as Chief Syarie Judge); Pehin Haji Abdul Wahab bin Haji Md. Said; Pehin Adanan Mohd. Yusof; Pengiran Raffizana Pengiran Razali (Acting Grand Chamberlain)
17	Highly special persons	Determined by the Sultan
18	Members of the Islamic Affairs Council	
19	Chairman of Public Service Commission	Hajah Norlila Haji Abdul Jalil
20	Judges of Syariah Court of Appeal	
21	Judges of Syariah High Court	
22	Justices of the High Court	
23	Clerk of Councils	Huraini Hurairah
24	Auditor-General	Haji Yusop Haji Mahmud
25	Special persons	Determined by the Sultan
26	Resident Ambassadors and High Commissioners	Refer to the Ministry of Foreign Affairs
27	Non-resident Ambassadors and High Commissioners	Refer to the Ministry of Foreign Affairs
28	Members of the Legislative Council	Refer to the Department of State Councils
29	Permanent Secretaries	
30	Managing Director of Brunei Darussalam Central Bank	Hajah Rashidah binti Haji Sabtu
31	Senior officials with a salary of BND 18,000	
32	Retired Chief of Armed Forces	
32	Retired Police Commissioner	
33	Vice Chancellors of Universities	Hazri Kifle (Universiti Brunei Darussalam); Pengiran Dr. Mohammad Iskandar Pengiran Haji Petra (Universiti Teknologi Brunei); Abdul Nasir Abdul Rani (Universiti Islam Sultan Sharif Ali); Arman Haji Asmad (Kolej Universiti Perguruan Ugama Seri Begawan)
34	Deputy Chairman of Public Service Commission	
35	Directors of Sultan Haji Hassanal Bolkiah Foundation	Refer here
36	His Majesty's Deputy Private and Confidential Secretary	
36	Private and Confidential Secretary to the Crown Prince	
37	Deputy Chief of Armed Forces	Brig. Gen. (U) Mohammad Sharif Ibrahim
37	Deputy Commissioner of Police	Deputy Commissioner Pengiran Anak Mohammed Saifullah Pengiran Anak Haji Idris
37	Chief of military services	Brig. Gen Aldi Hassan (Royal Brunei Land Force); First Admiral Sahibul Bahari (Royal Brunei Navy); Brig. Gen. (U) Haszahaidi Ahmad Daud (Royal Brunei Air Force)
37	Chief of Joint Forces	Col. Pengiran Noor Rumaizi
38	Deputy Permanent Secretaries	
39	Prosecutor-General	
40	Chief Executive Officer of the Authority of Info-communications Technology Industry	Haji Jailani bin Haji Buntar
41	Pengiran Peranakan	Refer to National Ceremonies Department
42	Pehin Manteri	Refer here
43	Manteri Hulubalang and Manteri Pedalaman	Refer here
44	Heads of departments	
44	Deputy heads of departments	
44	Assistant heads of departments	
44	Senior officials of departments	
45	B3 officers	
46	Officers holding academic degree	
47	Children of Pehin	Refer to National Ceremonies Department
48	Chieftains (Penghulu)	Refer here (as of April 2024)
49	Village heads (ketua kampung)	Refer here (as of April 2024)
50	Imams	
51	Businesspersons	
52	Pensioners	
