= Jabatan Adat Istiadat Negara =

Department in charge of customs and ceremonies of Brunei

Jabatan Adat Istiadat Negara جابتن عادة ايستيعادة نڬارا
- National emblem of Brunei

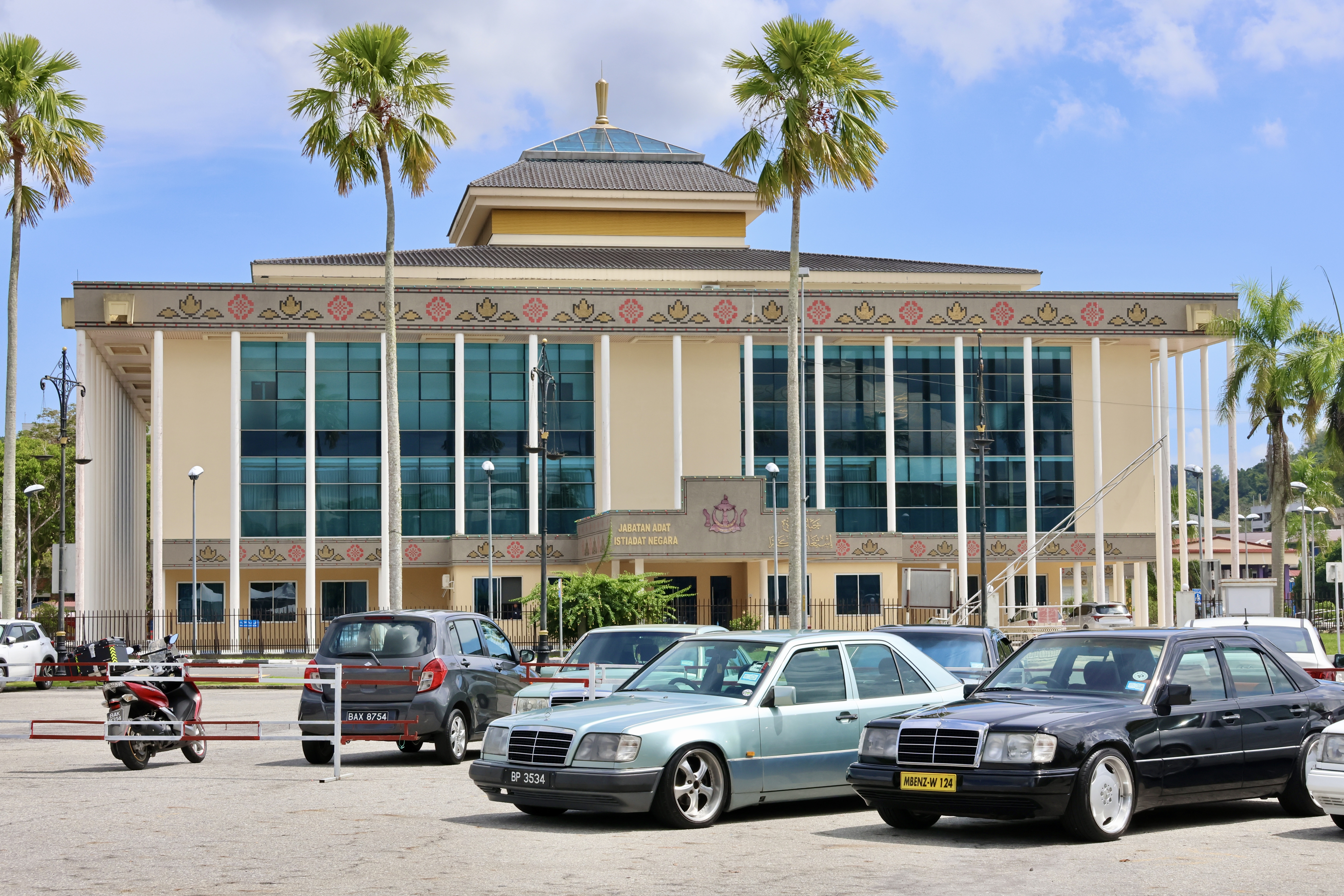
- JAIN headquarters in Pusat Bandar, Brunei

Agency overview
- Formed: 1 July 1954; 72 years ago
- Jurisdiction: Government of Brunei
- Headquarters: Adat Istiadat Negara Building, Jalan Bendahara, Bandar Seri Begawan, Brunei BS8611
- Agency executive: Pengiran Anak Idris, Yang Di-Pertua
- Parent agency: Prime Minister's Office
- Website: www.adat-istiadat.gov.bn

The Jabatan Adat Istiadat Negara (abbrev: JAIN) is a government department under the Prime Minister's Office that functions to guarantee the constant maintenance of Royal Customs. It has been translated literally as the Office of State Customs, the Department of the State Customs or the State Department of Customs and Traditions, even though it does not have an English name. In order to guarantee that the practice and implementation, particularly the Istiadat Diraja (Royal Ceremonies), are always in accordance with the philosophy of Melayu Islam Beraja, preaching and teaching the public through lectures, briefings, and workshops on Adat Istiadat (Customs) are regularly held.

== History ==
On 1 July 1954, the Jabatan Adat Istiadat, Ugama dan Kebajikan Masyarakat (Department of Customs, Religious and Social Welfare) was founded. Its first offices were located at the General Office of the Royal Secretariat Building (now known as the Secretariat Building). With the consent of Sultan Omar Ali Saifuddien III, the department was established with the royal appointment of Pengiran Anak Haji Mohamed Alam as the Pegawai Adat Istiadat, Ugama, and Kebajikan Masyarakat (Customs, Religious, and Social Welfare Officer).

With the authority granted by the Brunei 1959 Constitution, the Religious Section became the Department of Religious Affairs on 29 September 1959, and Pengiran Dato Seri Paduka Haji Ali became its new head. The Jabatan Adat Istiadat dan Kebajikan Masyarakat (Department of Customs and Social Welfare) was first founded in October 1961, as a result of the Kebajikan Masyarakat (Social Welfare Section) appointing Mohamed Salleh bin Haji Masri as its director, and the creation of the Jabatan Kebajikan Masyarakat Brunei (Brunei Social Welfare Department). Since then, Pengiran Anak Haji Mohamed Alam has served as the Yang Di-Pertua Adat Istiadat Negara of the Jabatan Adat Istiadat.

Following the construction of the Lapau in 1968, the Jabatan Adat Istiadat Negara (JAIN) relocated and took up temporary residence at the bottom of the structure. His son, Pengiran Anak Haji Mohammad Yusof, took over as head of JAIN on 1 December 1981. The development of the JAIN happened gradually under his direction. The Sultan of Brunei has been using JAIN since its founding, particularly when it comes to giving someone national honours. JAIN is currently housed in a permanent structure next to the Lapau. Pengiran Anak Haji Abdul Aziz's work and endeavours led to the foundation of this structure.

== Functions and responsibilities ==
Any new addition or modification to Bahasa Dalam requires the approval of JAIN. Documentation is essential for the dissemination of Bahasa Dalam knowledge. It is advised that pertinent authorities, such the Dewan Bahasa dan Pustaka, produce books with Bahasa Dalam glossaries with JAIN's assistance. The following are the roles and duties of JAIN:

- To perform traditional and official national ceremonies as instructed, including His Majesty The Sultan's Birthday celebrations, royal weddings, crown prince announcements, opening ceremonies, and more.
- To educate the populace and citizens of this nation about customs through lectures, workshops, briefings, and courses.
- To write invitations, setting up seats, greeting visitors, and bringing in certain equipment to improve State and Ceremonial Councils.
- To give guidance and support on protocol to government agencies, non-governmental organisations (NGOs), and associations that work with customs. This includes advice on how to conduct the ceremony, how to use royal ornaments and instruments, how to arrange people in specific positions during the ceremony, and how to handle the departure of state dignitaries and members of the royal family.
- To serve as secretary for meetings of the Conference of Customs, the special committee for the arrangement of government officials' positions in the public service at official government meetings, and others as needed.
- In charge of confirming that the design and dimensions of restricted goods, such as the government's and the royal family's personal coat of arms, individual flags, and the flag of Brunei, are accurate when they are provided by certain parties.
- To oversee and plan the activities of Title Granted Persons, including financial loan applications (home or auto loans), applications for exiting the nation, personal flag requirements, processing allowance awards during the Title Awarding Ceremony, processing title allowances, processing funeral allowances for deceased royal and aristocrats.

== List of chiefs ==
The title of Chief (Yang Di-Pertua) of Adat Istiadat Negara was formally elevated to ministerial level on 6 May 2024. Only four individuals have held the title since 1954:

No.	Portrait	Name	Took office	Left office	Time in office	Monarch
1		Pengiran Pemancha Sahibul Rae' Wal Mashuarah; Pengiran Anak Mohamed Alam ڤڠيرن انق محمد عالم (1918–1982)	1 July 1954	30 November 1981	27 years, 152 days	Omar Ali Saifuddien III
2		Pengiran Maharaja Lela Sahibul Kahar; Pengiran Anak Mohammad Yusof ڤڠيرن انق محمد يوسف (1948–2004)	1 December 1981	31 March 2000	18 years, 121 days	Hassanal Bolkiah
3		Pengiran Lela Cheteria Sahibun Najabah; Pengiran Anak Abdul Aziz ڤڠيرن انق عبدالعزيز (born 1945)	1 July 2000	8 April 2021	20 years, 281 days	Hassanal Bolkiah
4		Pengiran Indera Setia Diraja Sahibul Karib; Pengiran Anak Idris ڤڠيرن انق إدريس (born 1948)	9 April 2021	Incumbent	5 years, 121 days	Hassanal Bolkiah

== Adat Istiadat Council ==
=== Functions ===
The Adat Istiadat Council is to be established, as per the Customary Law and the 1959 Bruneian Constitution as amended in 2006. The chairman and other members of the council are appointed by the Sultan of Brunei and will serve as long as the Sultan and Yang Di-Pertuan see fit. Furthermore, the Adat Istiadat Council (Majlis Mesyuarat Adat Istiadat) will have the authority to counsel both the Yang Di-Pertuan and His Majesty the Sultan on issues pertaining to the traditions of the Adat Istiadat.

=== Members ===
Meetings of the Adat Istiadat Council are usually held at the Bilik Mesyuarat West Wing of the Prime Minister's Office Building. Among other things, the Adat Istiadat Council is in charge of periodically monitoring the evolution of customs, taking appropriate action, and guaranteeing that customs are perfectly implemented in accordance with the ideal of maintaining their authenticity and integrity. Pengiran-Pengiran, Cheteria, Cabinet Ministers, Council Members, the Royal Brunei Police Commissioner, the Commander of the Royal Brunei Armed Forces, and Pehin-Pehin Manteri make up the members of the council. As for the 2026–2027 year, the members were:

Position	Portrait	Name	Portfolio
Adviser		HRH Prince Al-Muhtadee Billah	Crown Prince of Brunei (1998–present); Senior Minister at the Prime Minister's Office (2005–present)
Chairman		HRH Prince Sufri Bolkiah	Bendahara (1979–present); President of Brunei Darussalam National Olympic Council (2010–present); President of National Football Association of Brunei Darussalam (2013–2019)
Deputy Chairman 1		HRH Prince Abdul Malik	Minister at the Prime Minister's Office (2026-present) Chairman of the Management Committee of the Sultan Haji Hassanal Bolkiah's Foundation (2013–present)
Deputy Chairman 2		HRH Prince Abdul Mateen	Minister of Foreign Affairs (2026-present)
Deputy Chairman 3		HRH Prince Jefri Bolkiah	Di-Gadong (1979–present); Minister of Culture, Youth and Sports (1984-1986); Minister of Finance (1986–1997)
Assistant Chairman		HH Pengiran Anak Idris	Yang Di-Pertua Adat Istiadat Negara (2021–present)
Member		HH Pengiran Anak Abdul Rahim	Cheteria 4 (2004–present)
Member		Badaruddin Othman	Minister of Religious Affairs (2015–present); Minister of Home Affairs (2010–2015); Manteri Ugama under Manteri 8
Member		Halbi Mohammad Yussof	Coordinating Minister for National Security(2026-present); Minister at the Prime Minister's Office (2022–present); Second Minister of Defence (2018–2022; 2023–present); Minister of Culture, Youth and Sports (2015–2018); Commander of the Royal Brunei Armed Forces (2003–2009); Commander of the Royal Brunei Land Force (2001–2003); Additional Manteri under Manteri 32
Member		Abdul Aziz Juned	State Mufti (1994–present); Kerala Manteri Ugama (1996–present)
Member		Pengiran Ibnu Ba'asith	Cheteria under Cheteria 4 (1977–present); Deputy Minister of Defence (1986–2005)
Member		HH Pengiran Kamarulzaman	Chairman of Sungai Liang Authority (2007–present); Cheteria 16
Member		Salim Besar	Chief Syar'ie Judge (2015–present); Additional Manteri Ugama Under Manteri Ugama
Member		Abdul Wahab Said	Manteri 8
Member		Adanan Yusof	Member of Legislative Council (2023-present); Minister of Health (2010–2015); Minister of Home Affairs (2005–2010); Deputy Minister of Home Affairs (2002–2005); Manteri 32
Member		Irwan Hambali	Commissioner of Police (2021–present)
Member		Haszaimi Bol Hassan	Commander of the Royal Brunei Armed Forces (2022–present); Commander of the Royal Brunei Land Force (2020–2022)

== See also ==
- Government of Brunei
- Council of Cabinet Ministers
- Privy Council (Brunei)
