= Pengiran =

Hereditary royal and noble title in Brunei

Pengiran is a hereditary royal and noble title used in Brunei. Depending on the accompanying words, family relationship and formal style, it may identify a prince or princess of the immediate Bruneian royal family, a member of the wider royal kin or a person belonging to Brunei's hereditary nobility.

The title is used by both men and women. It does not always correspond directly to the English title of prince. While forms such as Pengiran Muda and Pengiran Anak Puteri are associated with members of the immediate royal family, the unmodified Pengiran is also used by members of the wider hereditary nobility.

== History ==
The origin of the word Pengiran is uncertain. Proposed explanations have connected it with Chinese and Javanese terms, but no origin has been conclusively established.

One of the earliest known local occurrences of the title appears on a Bruneian tombstone dated 1514, belonging to a noble identified as Pengiran Syateria Maharaja Dinda. Sixteenth-century Spanish accounts of Brunei also referred to members of the Sultan's family as Panguilans or Panquilanes, which scholars have interpreted as early European renderings of Pengiran.

The Silsilah Raja-Raja Brunei, a genealogy of Brunei's rulers that also records royal customs, indicates that distinctions within the Pengiran nobility existed during the reign of Sultan Muhammad Hasan from 1582 to 1598.

Brunei's system of noble classification was reorganised during the reign of Sultan Omar Ali Saifuddien III, particularly between 1958 and 1959. The reforms strengthened the category of Pengiran Peranakan, or core nobles, and introduced or formalised the category of Pengiran Kebanyakan, commonly translated as ordinary nobles.

== Principal forms and uses ==
The different forms of Pengiran do not constitute a simple peerage ladder. They may indicate descent, gender, marriage, appointment or a title specifically conferred by the Sultan. The principal forms include:

Form	General use	Description
Pengiran Muda Mahkota	Crown Prince	The title of the formally proclaimed heir to the throne. Brunei's Succession and Regency Proclamation identifies the Crown Prince as Duli Yang Teramat Mulia Paduka Seri Pengiran Muda Mahkota and provides that the title passes to another person if a different lawful successor is proclaimed.
Pengiran Muda	Male members of the close royal line	Used by sons of a Sultan and certain male descendants of senior royal princes. The title is used by the Sultan's sons and by male children of the Crown Prince. In Brunei's succession law, Pengiran Muda can also have the specialised meaning of an heir presumptive whose claim may be displaced by a person with a better right to the throne.
Pengiran Anak Puteri	Royal princess	Used particularly by daughters of a Sultan. It is normally accompanied by a formal royal style such as Yang Teramat Mulia Paduka Seri.
Pengiran Anak Isteri	Wife of a royal prince	A title conferred on certain wives of royal princes. It is not an independently inherited title and remains subject to royal grant.
Pengiran Anak	Members of the close or core royal nobility	Used by both men and women belonging to several categories of close royal descent who are not styled Pengiran Muda or Pengiran Anak Puteri. The precise accompanying terasul, or formal style, varies according to descent, marriage, office and royal grant. These titles may be broadly compared with the British styles of Lord and Lady, rather than Prince or Princess, although the two systems are not directly equivalent.
Pengiran	Wider hereditary nobility	The basic hereditary title borne by both men and women of Pengiran descent. According to current guidance issued by the State Custom and Traditions Department, descendants bearing the titles Awangku or Dayangku may adopt Pengiran upon reaching the age of 18 or after marriage. The title may also be conferred by the Sultan on the basis of office, marriage or customary considerations. It generally denotes the wider, lower-ranking stratum of Brunei's hereditary nobility and is therefore relatively common in Brunei Darussalam.

== Pengiran Peranakan and Pengiran Kebanyakan ==
Academic descriptions commonly distinguish between the Pengiran Peranakan, meaning the core nobility, and the Pengiran Kebanyakan, meaning the ordinary or wider nobility.

The boundaries of the Pengiran Peranakan were historically determined by descent from a Sultan, Wazir or Cheteria within specified generational limits. These limits were reorganised and expanded during the reforms of 1958 and 1959.

The Succession and Regency Proclamation defines a Pengiran Kebanyakan as a person of Brunei noble blood other than a person legally classified as being of the blood of the Sultans of Brunei. Academic sources, however, have recorded differing interpretations. Some describe the Pengiran Kebanyakan as nobles outside the core category, including remote descendants of earlier Sultans, while other definitions treat them as noble families who are not descended from a Sultan. Consequently, the term does not have a single uncontested genealogical definition in the academic literature.

== Awangku and Dayangku ==
Awangku is the corresponding male title and Dayangku the female title used among certain younger members of Pengiran descent. Current guidance from the State Custom and Traditions Department states that holders may begin using Pengiran when they reach the age of 18.

Older academic and historical descriptions instead associated the change from Awangku or Dayangku to Pengiran with marriage. These sources described Awangku as the title of an unmarried male noble and Dayangku as its female equivalent, with Pengiran used after marriage. The difference reflects varying descriptions of the practice at different periods.

== Styles and ceremonial offices ==
A Pengiran's hereditary title is distinct from the person's formal style or terasul. In official Bruneian usage, a terasul is used before a name in formal correspondence, royal ceremonies and other official settings. Examples include Duli Yang Teramat Mulia, Yang Teramat Mulia, Yang Amat Mulia and Yang Mulia.

The appropriate style depends on a person's relationship to the Sultan, descent, ceremonial office and any title conferred by the monarch. Academic studies of Brunei's palace language note that longer honorific forms generally indicate higher ceremonial status, but the placement and use of individual terms also depend on the category of the person being addressed.

The traditional offices of Wazir and Cheteria are also separate from the basic hereditary forms of Pengiran. Wazirs rank immediately below the Sultan in the traditional hierarchy, followed by the Cheteria. These are offices or dignities conferred on eligible nobles rather than titles automatically inherited by every Pengiran. Titles such as Pengiran Bendahara, Pengiran Di-Gadong, Pengiran Pemancha and Pengiran Temenggong therefore combine the hereditary designation Pengiran with a separately conferred traditional office.

== Use of Tengku ==
The Malay royal title Tengku is also borne by a branch of the Bruneian royal family descended from Princess Nor Ehsani of Brunei, daughter of Sultan Ahmad Tajuddin, the 27th Sultan of Brunei. Its use within this branch reflects the family's dynastic connections with the Selangor royal family and is distinct from the wider Bruneian Pengiran title system.

Nor Ehsani's mother, Tengku Raihani, was a daughter of Sultan Ala'eddin Sulaiman Shah of Selangor. A historical study records Nor Ehsani at birth as “Tengku Norehsani”. Tengku is an inherited Malay royal title and is the form used by the royal family of Selangor.

Nor Ehsani married her maternal first cousin, Tengku Pengiran bin Tengku Abdul Aziz, who was also a grandson of Sultan Ala'eddin Sulaiman Shah. A genealogical account identifies their three sons as Tengku Putera Muhammad Fawzy, Tengku Putera Amir Farouk and Tengku Putera Muhammad Harris Fadzillah. A separate genealogical account also records the use of Tengku Putera and Tengku Puteri by the sons and daughter, respectively, of Muhammad Harris Fadzillah.

== See also ==
- House of Bolkiah
- Malay styles and titles
- Succession to the Bruneian throne
- Vizier (Brunei)
- Cheteria
- Order of precedence in Brunei
- Jabatan Adat Istiadat Negara
