= Pengiran Ibnu Basit =

Bruneian military office (born 1943)

Yang Amat Mulia Pengiran Sanggamara Diraja Major General (Retired) Pengiran Ibnu Basit PSPNB DSNB DSLJ PHBS PBLI PKL
- ڤڠيرن ابن باسيت
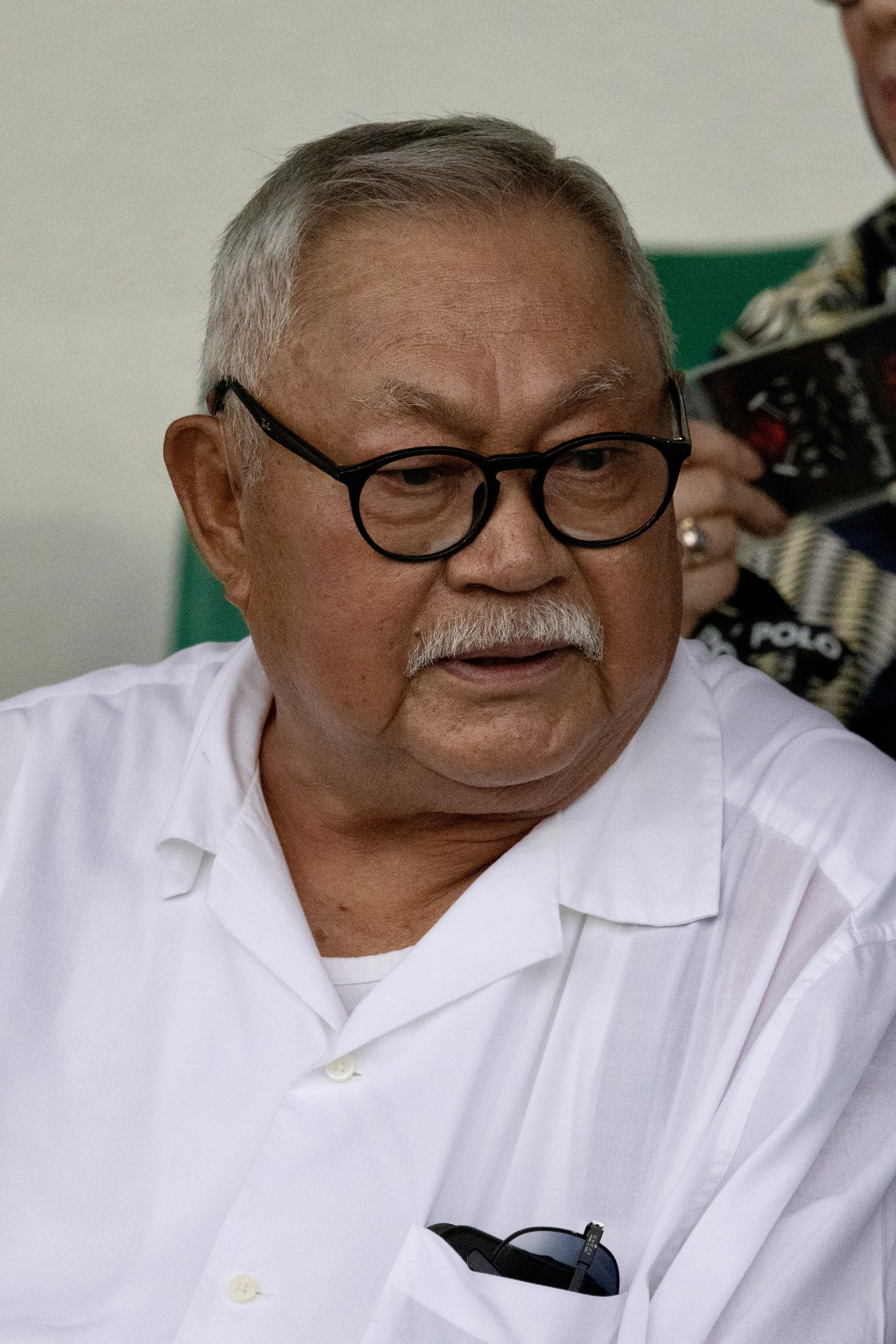
- Pengiran Ibnu Basit in 2024

1st Deputy Minister of Defence
- In office 20 October 1986 – 24 May 2005
- Monarch: Hassanal Bolkiah
- Minister: Hassanal Bolkiah
- Preceded by: Office established
- Succeeded by: Yasmin Umar

1st Commander of the Boat Section, Royal Brunei Malay Regiment
- In office 1965–1966
- Preceded by: Office established
- Succeeded by: Kefli Razali

Personal details
- Born: Awangku Ibnu Basit bin Pengiran Apong; 20 January 1942 (age 84) Brunei
- Relations: Pengiran Umar (brother)
- Education: Federation Military College; Staff College, Camberley
- Profession: Military officer; politician

Military service
- Branch/service: Royal Brunei Land Force
- Years of service: 1962–1986
- Rank: Major General
- Unit: First Flotilla, RBMR
- Commands: KDB Maharajalela; Boat Section, RBMR

Pengiran Ibnu Basit bin Pengiran Haji Apong (Note: The alternate spelling of his given name is "Pengiran Ibnu Ba'asith" rather than "Pengiran Ibnu Basit.") (born 20 January 1942) is a Bruneian military officer and noble politician. He served as the first local commanding officer of the Boat Section, the predecessor to the Royal Brunei Navy, from 1965 to 1966. He later held the position of Brunei's deputy minister of defence from 1986 to 2005.

== Early life and education ==
Awangku Ibnu Basit bin Pengiran Apong was born in Brunei on 20 January 1942, the son of Pengiran Datu Penghulu Pengiran Haji Apong bin Pengiran Saifuddin, who served as the ketua kampung of Sungai Kianggeh. In early December 1960, a radio station and the local newspaper announced a two-year officer cadet training opportunity at the Federation Military College (FMC) in Malaya. By mid-December, 17 cadets who had applied for the programme underwent a selection process at the Sultan Omar Ali Saifuddien College gymnasium in Tasek Lama, where they were interviewed by a panel of four officers from the Malayan armed forces. Only three out of the seven candidates were selected: Sulaiman Damit, Mohammad Daud, and Awangku Ibnu Basit, who became known as the "three musketeers". On 24 December 1960, they took their oaths before departing Brunei the next day through Singapore.

During their first year as junior cadets, they underwent basic military training, which included parade drills, weapons handling, tactics, administration, and the military code of justice. Alongside their military instruction, they also received academic education to prepare for the Higher School Certificate, equivalent to the GCE 'A' Level. Their second year of senior cadet training was significantly more challenging. By 4 November 1961, as part of the Malayan armed forces, the cadets were temporarily assigned to a battalion in Mentakab, Pahang, and Pengkalan Chepa, Kelantan, where they gained practical experience and further honed their skills.

== Military career ==
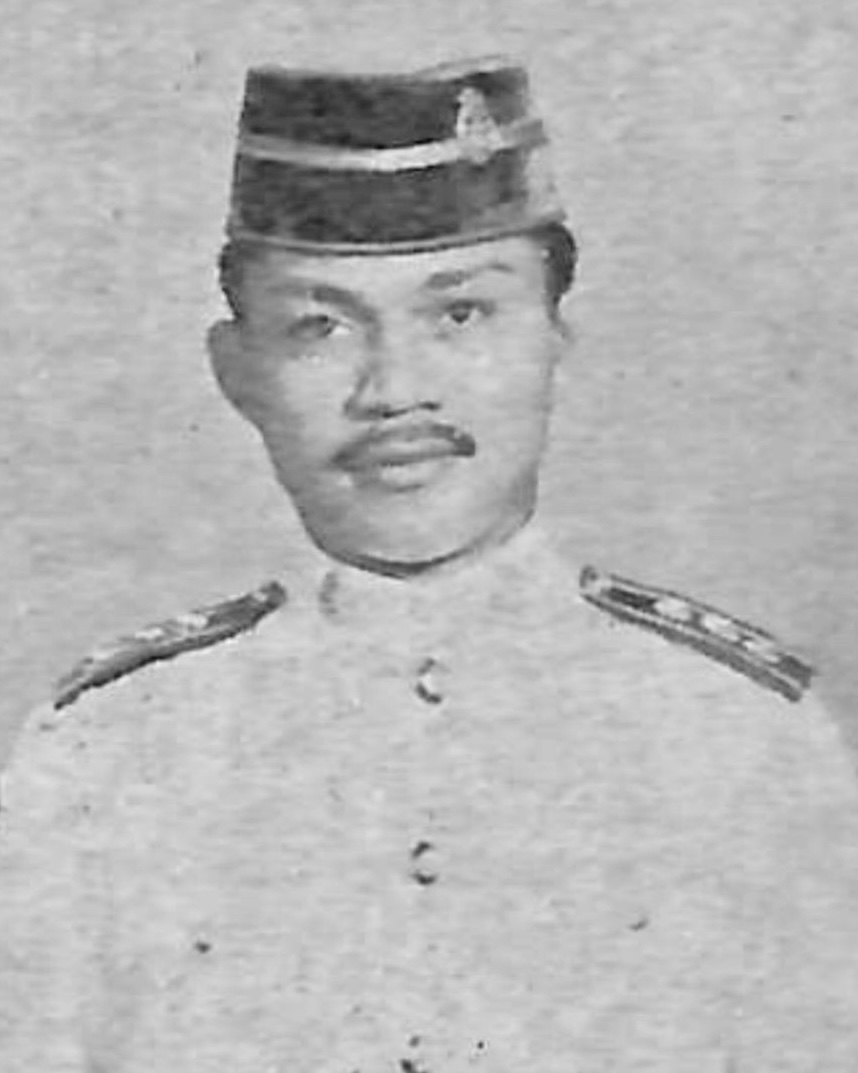
Awangku Ibnu Basit in the Brunei Malay Regiment, c. 1969

On 8 December 1962, Awangku Ibnu Basit was among the three musketeers to be commissioned as a second lieutenant by Sultan Omar Ali Saifuddien III, in a ceremony presided over by the Yang di-Pertuan Agong of Malaya, Putra of Perlis. This marked the official start of his military career. Having completed his officer cadet training, he had earned the rank of second lieutenant. During his time at the FMC, Awangku Ibnu Basit underwent training in infantry tactics, jungle warfare, public order management, and ceremonial duties, all of which equipped him for a future leadership role in the armed forces.

Between 1965 and 1966, he served as the first commanding officer of the Brunei Malay Regiment's Boat Section. During this time, he spent three months at a marine school in Labuan, learning seamanship and navigation. Shortly after, he was appointed commanding officer of KDB Maharajalela and was also associated with the Marine Department, undertaking voyages to Limbang and Labuan. He was later selected to attend a two-week navigation course in Singapore, returning home in mid-1966 with a newly acquired riverine patrol boat. Due to his strong performance, he was given the opportunity to enrol in an advanced course in Kota Kinabalu. Notably, during a deployment to Kuching, he was involved in a rescue operation when one of his crew members fell overboard while passing through the Sarawak River.

In 1968, alongside the other "three musketeers," he underwent advanced small arms and tactics training at the British Army School of Infantry in Warminster. This was followed by attachments to three British battalions in Germany and a British infantry brigade. After completing this training, he was promoted to major on 1 July 1969, along with Captain H. N. Houghton. In 1971, he attended a course in Australia after passing the Staff College Entrance Examination. During Queen Elizabeth II's visit to Brunei in 1972, he was appointed as her parade commander. Lieutenant Colonel Pengiran Ibnu Basit formed the Second Battalion on 2 January 1975 at a temporary location in Bolkiah Camp. In 1977, he became aide-de-camp to Sultan Hassanal Bolkiah, and in 1986, he retired with the rank of major general.

== Political career ==
Following his military career, Pengiran Ibnu Basit was appointed as deputy minister of defence in 1986. This came after the passing of Omar Ali and a subsequent cabinet reshuffle. As the supreme commander of the RBAF, Sultan Hassanal Bolkiah assumed the defence ministry role from his late father and named the retired Major General Pengiran Ibnu Basit as his deputy defence minister on 20 October of the same year.

On 8 June 2000, Achmad Sutjipto, Chief of Staff of the Indonesian Navy, paid a courtesy call to Pengiran Ibnu Basit as part of his two-day official visit to Brunei following his appointment as commander the previous year. Later, on 31 July, the Ministry of Defence hosted the 6th Defence Cooperation Committee meeting between Bruneian and Malaysian governments at the Royal Brunei Recreation Club, where military training programs and other defense cooperation initiatives were discussed. During this meeting, bilateral defence topics were reviewed during a courtesy visit by Malaysian Ministry of Defence's secretary with Pengiran Ibnu Basit. Additionally, on 14 September, Pengiran Ibnu Basit attended a briefing at the Bolkiah Garrison by the multinational company Thomson-CSF, which presented management-level employment opportunities to senior government officials.

As part of a three-day formal visit to deepen bilateral military and defence cooperation between Malaysia and Brunei, Malaysian Defence Minister Najib Razak made a courtesy call to Pengiran Ibnu Basit at his office in Bolkiah Garrison on 29 January 2001. During the visit, Pengiran Ibnu Basit emphasised the importance of thoroughly understanding and sincerely executing their mission to protect the nation's sovereignty. On 11 May, he reminded the RBAF personnel not to become complacent, stressing the critical role they play as the nation's defence line and the need to carry out their duties and responsibilities with dedication.

As part of a three-day official visit to strengthen bilateral defence ties between Brunei and Thailand, Supreme Commander of the Royal Thai Armed Forces Narong Yuthavong and his delegation arrived in Brunei on 10 April 2002 and paid a courtesy call to Pengiran Ibnu Basit on 1 May. Later that month, on 20 April, Chief of Defence Force Lim Chuan Poh and his delegation also paid a courtesy call. On 22 October, as part of a one-day visit to enhance defence relations with Australia, Chief of Air Force Angus Houston and his delegation followed suit with a courtesy call to Pengiran Ibnu Basit. Later, on 17 December, he received a courtesy call from Md Hashim Hussein, the Chief of Army, who had previously visited the Commander of the RBAF, Halbi Mohd Yussof, at the same location.

On 30 January 2003, Pengiran Ibnu Basit attended a demonstration of the new Forges de Zeebrugge (FZ Rocket) system for the Bo105s at Binturan Firing Range. On 12 March, Pengiran Ibnu Basit received a courtesy call from Jean-Paul Panié, director general for international relations, who was in Brunei leading the French delegation for the 4th Brunei–France Joint Defence Working Committee Meeting. From 30 May to 1 June, he attended the 2nd Asia Security Conference: The Shangri-La Dialogue in Singapore, organised by the International Institute for Strategic Studies, alongside defence ministers, deputy ministers, and military leaders from the Asia–Pacific.

On 16 March 2004, Pengiran Ibnu Basit hosted Chappy Hakim, chief of staff of the Indonesian Air Force, for a courtesy visit during his two-day trip aimed at enhancing military cooperation between the two nations. Later that year, on 21 September, he officiated the opening of the 33rd Pacific Area Senior Officer Logistics Seminar in Brunei, where senior military officials gathered to discuss regional security and logistics collaboration. His tenure as deputy minister ended with his retirement during the cabinet reshuffle on 24 May 2005, with Yasmin Umar appointed as his successor.

== Later life ==
After his ministerial career, Pengiran Ibnu Basit served as an advisor to the Brunei Darussalam Former Soldiers Association. Additionally, he became a member of the Adat Istiadat Council as early as 2018.

On 21 October 2022, Mohammad and Pengiran Ibnu Basit attended the FMC Intake 5 60th anniversary reunion in Kuala Lumpur, where they met with other veterans. Following this, on 21 November 2024, Pengiran Ibnu Basit was appointed as a member of the Council of Succession by the command of the sultan. On 8 January 2025, in a ceremony presided over by Pengiran Ibnu Basit and Shari Ahmad, the headquarters of the Veteran Association of RBAF was officially renamed WISMA PERWIRA.

== Personal life ==
Pengiran Ibnu Basit has a brother, Pengiran Umar, who served as the police commissioner from 1984 to 1991.

== Titles, styles and honours ==
=== Titles and styles ===
Personal standard of Pengiran Sanggamara Diraja

In 1973, Pengiran Ibnu Basit was honoured by Sultan Hassanal Bolkiah with the cheteria title of Pengiran Datu Penghulu. He was later elevated to the title of Pengiran Ratna Indera in 1974, and eventually to Pengiran Sanggamara Diraja on 10 February 1977. His titles are styled as Yang Amat Mulia.

- 1973 – 1974: Pengiran Datu Penghulu
- 1974 – 10 February 1977: Pengiran Ratna Indera
- 10 February 1977 – present: Pengiran Sanggamara Diraja

=== Awards ===
- VECONAC Medal of Honour (7 October 2016)
- VECONAC Honorary President (7 October 2016)

=== Honours ===
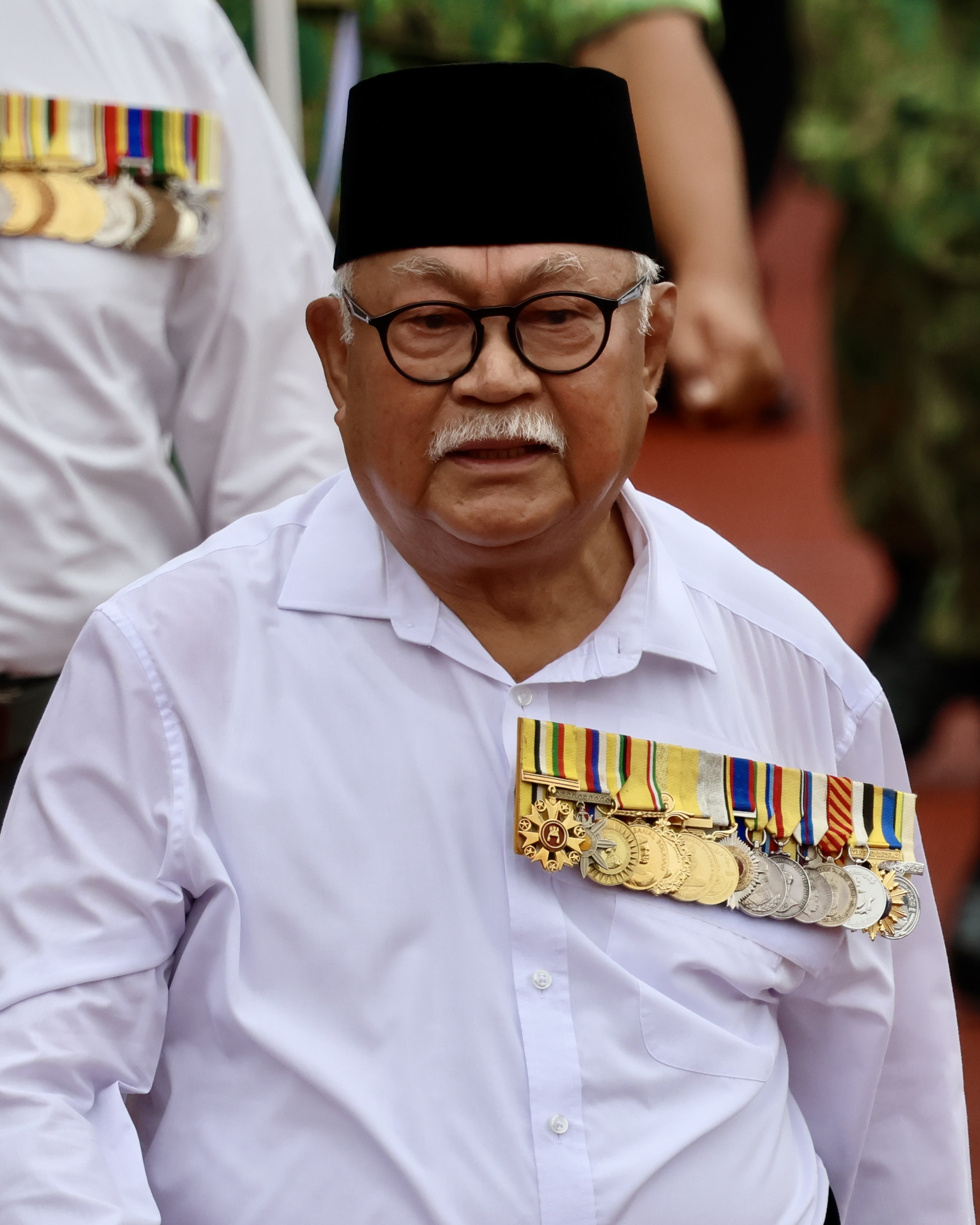
Pengiran Ibnu Basit wearing his state honours at the 2024 National Day celebration

Pengiran Ibnu Basit has been bestowed the following honours:

National

- Order of Pahlawan Negara Brunei First Class (PSPNB; 10 February 1976) – Dato Seri Pahlawan
- Order of Paduka Seri Laila Jasa Second Class (DSLJ) – Dato Seri Laila Jasa
- Order of Setia Negara Brunei Second Class (DSNB) – Dato Setia
- Order of Seri Paduka Mahkota Brunei Second Class Class (DPMB) – Dato Paduka
- Sultan Hassanal Bolkiah Medal (PHBS; 1968)
- Pingat Bakti Laila Ikhlas (PBLI; 2 June 1976)
- Long Service Medal (PKL)
- Coronation Medal (1 August 1968)
- Sultan of Brunei Silver Jubilee Medal (5 October 1992)
- Sultan of Brunei Golden Jubilee Medal (5 October 2017)
- National Day Silver Jubilee Medal (23 February 2009)
- Royal Brunei Armed Forces Silver Jubilee Medal (31 May 1986)
- Proclamation of Independence Medal (1997)
- General Service Medal (Armed Forces)
- Long Service Medal and Good Conduct (PKLPB)

Foreign

- Egypt :
  - Order of the Republic
- Indonesia :
  - Grand Meritorious Military Order Star, 1st Class (26 June 1990)
- Malaysia :
  - Honorary Commander of the Order of Loyalty to the Crown of Malaysia (PSM; 1989)
  - Courageous Commander of The Most Gallant Order of Military Service (PGAT; 1987)
  - Order of the Defender of the Realm
  - Most Exalted Order of the Star of Sarawak
  - Installation Medal of the Sultan of Pahang as 7th Yang di-Pertuan Agong (10 July 1980)
  - Sultan Salahuddin Silver Jubilee Medal (3 September 1985)
- Singapore :
  - Darjah Utama Bakti Cemerlang (Tentera) (DUBC; 29 September 1992)

=== Things named after him ===
- Surau Pengiran Ratna Indera, a place of worship in the 2nd Battalion's Tutong Camp
- Jalan Pengiran Ibnu, a road in Tutong Camp
- Jalan Ibnu, a road in Tutong Camp

== Notes ==
Political offices
Preceded by Office established	1st Deputy Minister of Defence; 20 October 1986 – 24 May 2005	Succeeded by Yasmin Umar
Military offices
Preceded by Office established	1st Commander of the Boat Section, Royal Brunei Malay Regiment; 1965–1966	Succeeded by Kefli Razali
