= Pengiran Anak Idris =

Bruneian prince (born 1948)

Pengiran Anak Idris ڤڠيرن انق إدريس
- Pengiran Indera Setia Diraja Sahibul Karib
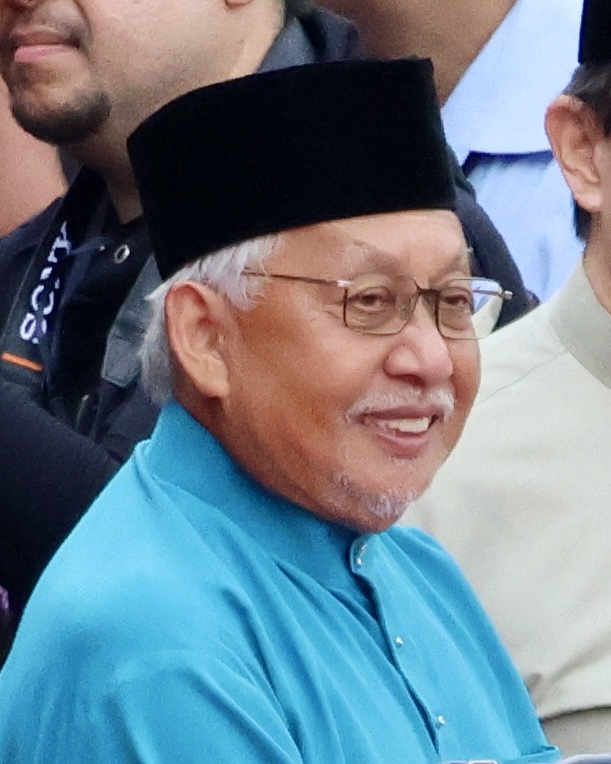
- Pengiran Anak Idris in 2024

4th Chief of Adat Istiadat Negara
- Incumbent
- Assumed office 9 April 2021
- Monarch: Hassanal Bolkiah
- Preceded by: Pengiran Anak Abdul Aziz
- Born: Pengiran Idris bin Pengiran Muda Abdul Kahar; January 1948 (age 78); Brunei
- Spouse: Princess Amal Umi Kalthum Al-Islam (m. 1972)
- Issue: Pengiran Anak Mohammed Saifullah; Pengiran Anak Abdul Nafee'; Pengiran Anak Abdul Ghaffar; Pengiran Anak Abdul Mu'iz; Pengiran Anak Huda Bahaaul Bulqiah
Regnal name
- Pengiran Indera Setia Diraja Sahibul Karib Pengiran Anak Haji Idris bin Pengiran Maharaja Lela Pengiran Muda Abdul Kahar
- House: Bolkiah
- Father: Pengiran Muda Abdul Kahar
- Religion: Sunni Islam

Pengiran Anak Idris (born January 1948) is a Bruneian nobleman and member of the royal family who became the prince consort to Princess Amal Umi Kalthum Al-Islam in 1972, the daughter of Sultan Omar Ali Saifuddien III. He is the current Chief (Yang Di-Pertua) of Jabatan Adat Istiadat Negara, a member of the Privy Council of Brunei, and assistant chairman of Adat Istiadat Council (Majlis Mesyuarat Adat Istiadat), and Yayasan Sultan Haji Hassanal Bolkiah's board of governors.

== Biography ==
On 31 March 2008, at the surau of Istana Nurul Iman, Pengiran Anak Idris led the prayers of gratitude for the Istiadat Bersiram of Azrinaz Mazhar Hakim on the occasion of Princess Ameerah Wardatul Bolkiah's birth.

Since 9 April 2021, Pengiran Anak Idris has become the Chief of the Royal Customs and Protocols Department. He carried out duties at royal and national events, such as the wedding of Prince Abdul Mateen and Anisha Rosnah in 2024, Princess Azemah and Prince Bahar in 2023 and Tahlil ceremonies. His spouse goes with him to a number of functions and ceremonies. By order of Sultan Hassanal Bolkiah, Yang Di-Pertua Adat Istiadat Negara, which is presently held by Pengiran Anak Idris, will become a ministerial-level position starting on 6 May 2024.

== Personal life ==
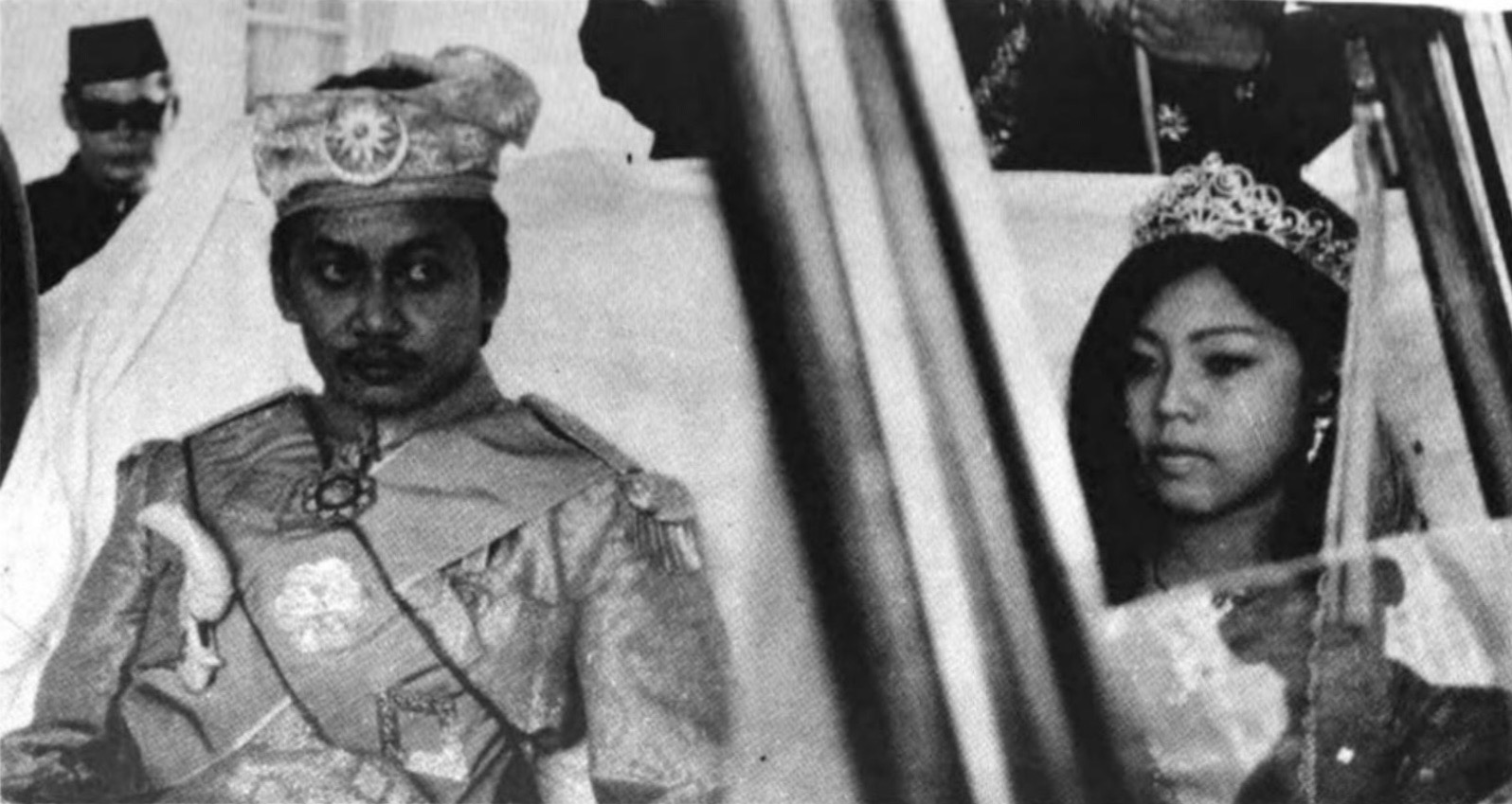
The wedding ceremony in 1972

Pengiran Idris is born in January 1948, to Pengiran Maharaja Lela Pengiran Muda Abdul Kahar bin Pengiran Bendahara Pengiran Anak Haji Mohamed Yassin (died 16 April 1957). Additionally, he is also the nephew of Pengiran Anak Kemaluddin and cousin to Dayangku Najibah Eradah. The President of the Women Graduates' Association (PSW), Pengiran Datin Paduka Hajah Hairani, is his sister.

Pengiran Anak Idris married Princess Amal Umi Kalthum Al-Islam on 16 December 1972, followed by a complete compliance to the ceremonial customs of royal marriages in Brunei. Earlier on 11 December, one of the marriage ceremony was held at Omar Ali Saifuddien Mosque. This made him the brother-in-law of Sultan Hassanal Bolkiah.

Together they have several children who are:

- Pengiran Anak Haji Mohammed Saifullah, Assistant Commissioner of Police
- Pengiran Anak Haji Abdul Nafee' (born January 1983), married to Pengiran Yura Halimatussa'adah
- Pengiran Anak Haji Abdul Ghaffar, married to Syafiqah Niqmatullah
- Pengiran Anak Haji Abdul Mu'iz, married to Wan Haziqah
- Pengiran Anak Hajah Huda Bahaaul Bulqiah, (born 11 May 1981) married Pengiran Haji Muhammad Suhaimi

== Titles, styles and honours ==
=== Titles and styles ===
Personal standard of Pengiran Indera Setia Diraja Sahibul Karib

Pengiran Anak Idris was bestowed the Cheteria title of Pengiran Indera Setia Diraja Sahibul Karib on 8 April 1975, with him previously holding Pengiran Indera Negara on 28 April 1973. His titles are styled as Yang Amat Mulia. Additionally, he has earned the following honours;

=== Honours ===
National

- Family Order of Laila Utama (DK) – Dato Laila Utama
- Order of Seri Paduka Mahkota Brunei Third Class (SMB)
- Sultan Hassanal Bolkiah Medal (PHBS; 1 August 1968)
- Pingat Bakti Laila Ikhlas (PBLI; 16 February 2008)
- Meritorious Service Medal (PJK)
- Sultan of Brunei Silver Jubilee Medal (5 October 1992)
- Sultan of Brunei Golden Jubilee Medal (5 October 2017)
- National Day Silver Jubilee Medal (23 February 2009)

Foreign

- Sarawak:
  - Knight Commander of the Most Exalted Order of the Star of Sarawak (PNBS) – Dato Sri
- Egypt:
  - Grand Cordon of the Order of the Nile

Political offices
Preceded by Pengiran Anak Abdul Aziz	4th Chief of Adat Istiadat Negara; 9 April 2021 – present	Incumbent
