= Cheteria =

Brunei Hierarchy

The Cheteria are a group of noble dignitaries within the Sultanate of Brunei whose position ranks below the Wazir (Vizier) but above the Manteri. Each carry specialised tasks and report directly to the Sultan of Brunei. The Cheteria hierarchy is structured around what is known as the Four Fold system which expands up to 32 folds. The title of Cheteria are only bestowed upon the Pengiran, especially to the caste of Pengiran known as the Pengiran Peranakan. The awarding of such titles are held in a ceremony called "mengangkat".

== History ==
The word Cheteria likely derives from the name of the Kshatriya warrior caste in Hinduism. These Bruneian traditional officials, who were part of the second class of officials in the country's traditional administration, were crucial to the state's decision-making process. In contrast to the Wazir, who were solely picked from the core aristocracy, they were recited from both the core and common nobility. The Pengiran Shahbandar Sahibul Bandar, traditionally function as the minister of commerce, was the highest-ranking representative in this group. Currently all ranks of Cheteria are primarily drawn from Brunei's nobility.

Majapahit's dominance started to decline in the early 15th century, and Brunei became an independent nation in 1408. Despite Brunei's independence from Majapahit, Javanese Hindu-Buddhism had a significant cultural effect that is still visible in modern Brunei, particularly in social norms and the established governmental structure. An example of this are the titles of Indera (derived from Indra) and Maharaja (vassal kings with little possessions).

== Functions ==
Although titles are still awarded today, the functions that they entail have changed to reflect the needs of the contemporary political structure. For instance, Pengiran Anak Abdul Wahab, the former bearer of the noble title Pengiran Kerma Negara, which is the chief of defence, is a pensioner who once worked in the Land Department. On another note, the nomination of traditional officials persists even though the contemporary administrative system has practically superseded the ancient political system. In addition to serving ceremonially, these officers serve as a conduit between the Sultan and his subjects, advising him on issues that impact the country as a whole.

== Hierarchy ==
In Bruneian society, a person's position and status are indicated by a variety of characteristics. A royal court or state function's seating arrangement is one method. In seating configurations, di atas (upper) and di bawah (lower) are used as measurements. The top end, which is often the farthest from the door, is occupied by those of greatest status. The remaining guests are placed near the entrance in decreasing order of rank. Gradations of precedence may also be shown by a person's sitting arrangement, whereby those on the right are sat higher than those on the left.

The title has been awarded to the authorities permanently. Even after passing away, the titleholder would continue be in possession of the title. It is common for officials to be promoted to a higher position within the same office and given a different title, nevertheless. The title may be inherited, as an official's successor may take office with the same title as his forebear. On the other hand, there are instances where the sons of officials are sworn in with titles that differ from their dads.

The sub-viziers, referred to as the Cheteria in the local dialect, were placed in 4, 8, 16, and 32 ranks. To supplement, nevertheless, other positions were made inside the division. For example, Sultan Hassanal Bolkiah appointed one Additional Cheteria Under Cheteria 4 rank and two Additional Cheteria Under Cheteria 16 rank. These aristocratic officials can be identified by their ceremonial costumes during royal ceremonies. The Kepala Cheteria maintains the highest rank. In general, however, the number of positions within each Cheteria level follows the number of the level e.g.; the Cheteria 8 would consist of eight positions and Cheteria 32 of thirty-two positions. An exception to this would be the Kepala Cheteria of which there are two ranks, and the Cheteria Tambahan di Bawah Cheteria 4 and 16 ranks of which; there is one Cheteria Tambahan di Bawah Cheteria 4 and two Cheteria Tambahan di Bawah Cheteria 16.

There are several levels within the Cheteria group:

- Kepala Cheteria
- Cheteria 4
- Cheteria Tambahan di Bawah Cheteria 4
- Cheteria 8
- Cheteria 16
- Cheteria Tambahan di Bawah Cheteria 16
- Cheteria 32

== Title and styling ==
Every individual who is bestowed with the position of Cheteria are given a unique title and referred to with the honorific style Yang Amat Mulia (The Glorious). For example; for someone who is awarded the title Pengiran Kesuma Negara which is a position in the Cheteria 8, would be fully styled as Yang Amat Mulia Pengiran Kesuma Negara, followed by another title (if any) and then real name.

== Court uniform and dress ==
Invested officials' ceremonial attire during royal court events indicates their position. Certain authorities use traditional woven cloths with certain colors and designs as part of their ceremonial attire. Umbrellas and personal standards are also employed as concrete indicators of rank. Some leaders' personal standards serve as pretty accurate markers of their position and level of authority. The state flag is flown by average residents, whereas those descended from nobles have their own standards. The traditional officials' ceremonial attire and personal standard have a similar colour. The highest ranks of Brunei society are the only ones who wear umbrellas as a symbol of their position.

The dress code for any royal court occasion determined the dress code based on the wearer's status and the time of the event. According to their position, traditional or royal dignitaries used various kinds, patterns, styles, motifs, and colors of traditional dastar and arat (belt). Every male dignitary has a keris with them. Only the Cheteria, the traditional noble officials, are outfitted in ceremonial dress costumes for royal court events. Every level of the Cheteria's traditional textiles has the same pattern and design, but rank is distinguished by a change in colour. The fabric features a Jong sarat pattern embroidered with the flying fox motif, or bunga cheteria bersiku keluang. The Chief Cheteria wears dark purple, followed by the secondary Cheteria 4, who wear light purple, the Cheteria 8 orange, the Cheteria 16 blue, the Cheteria 32 pink, and the Additional Cheteria Under Cheteria 4 green with red stripes.

Copper, silver, and gold items used in royal ceremonies reveal the rank and identity of the owner. Items such as the keris (Malay dagger) and kaskol (gold betel container) are given to royal dignitaries who received the title of Wazir, Cheteria, and Manteri. The kaskol is only given to the Wazir and Kepala Cheteria while Cheteria-Cheteria and Manteri-Manteri such as the Pehin Dato Perdana Manteri and Pehin Orang Kaya Di-Gadong received the silver-born tipa (container or vessel to store betel and its seasonings) while copper-born tipa was granted to other officials.

In Brunei, dignitaries fly their own flag or standard in place of the national one. The person's rank determines the colour of the flag. The Perdana Wazir's is white, whereas the Sultan's personal flag is yellow. Other dignitaries fly a purple flag, including Cheteria 4. Additionally, the flag's colour matches the royal court's ceremonial attire.

Ceremonial uniforms of Cheteria-Cheteria

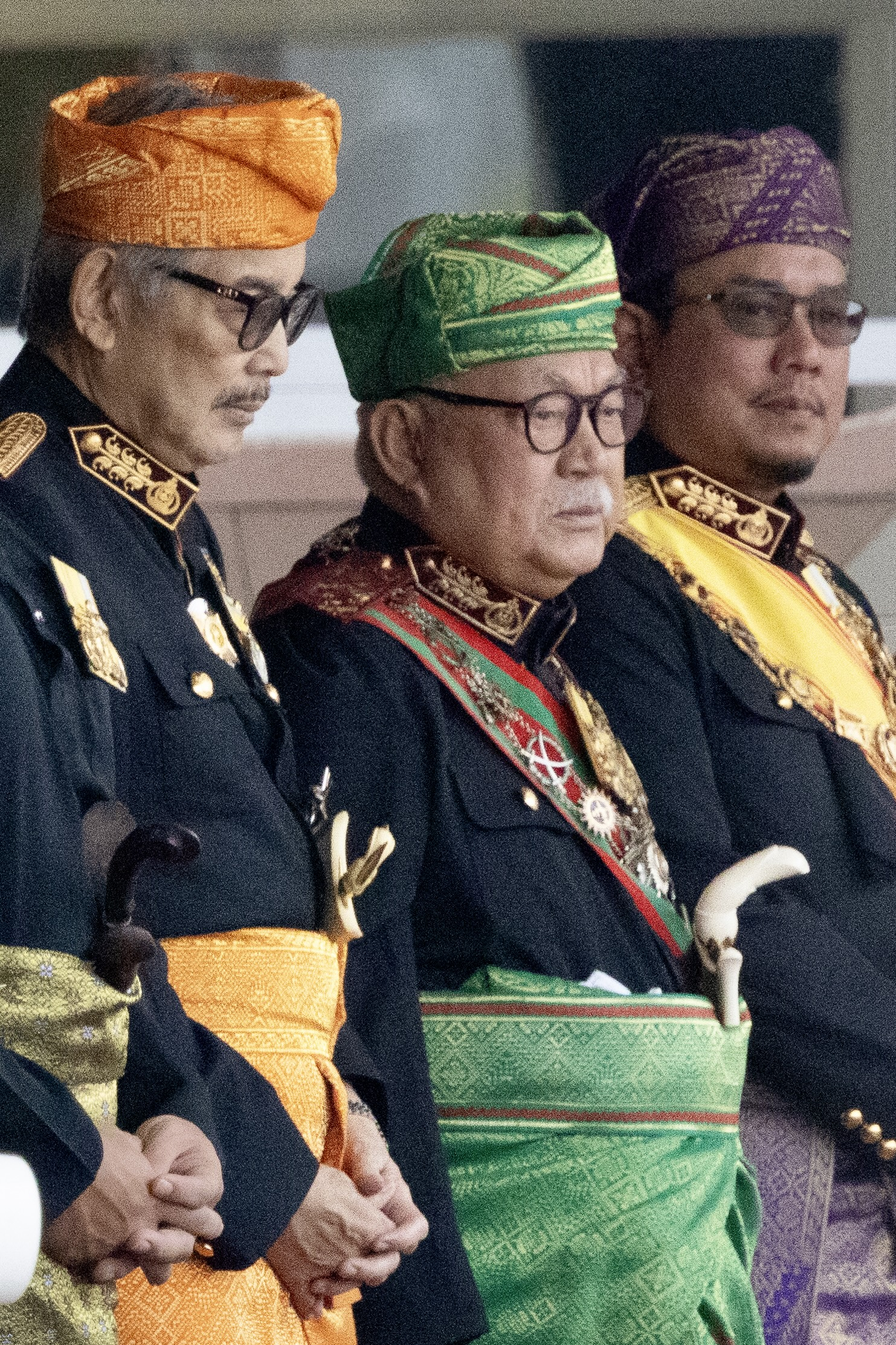
Cheteria 8, Cheteria Tambahan di Bawah Cheteria 4 and Cheteria 4

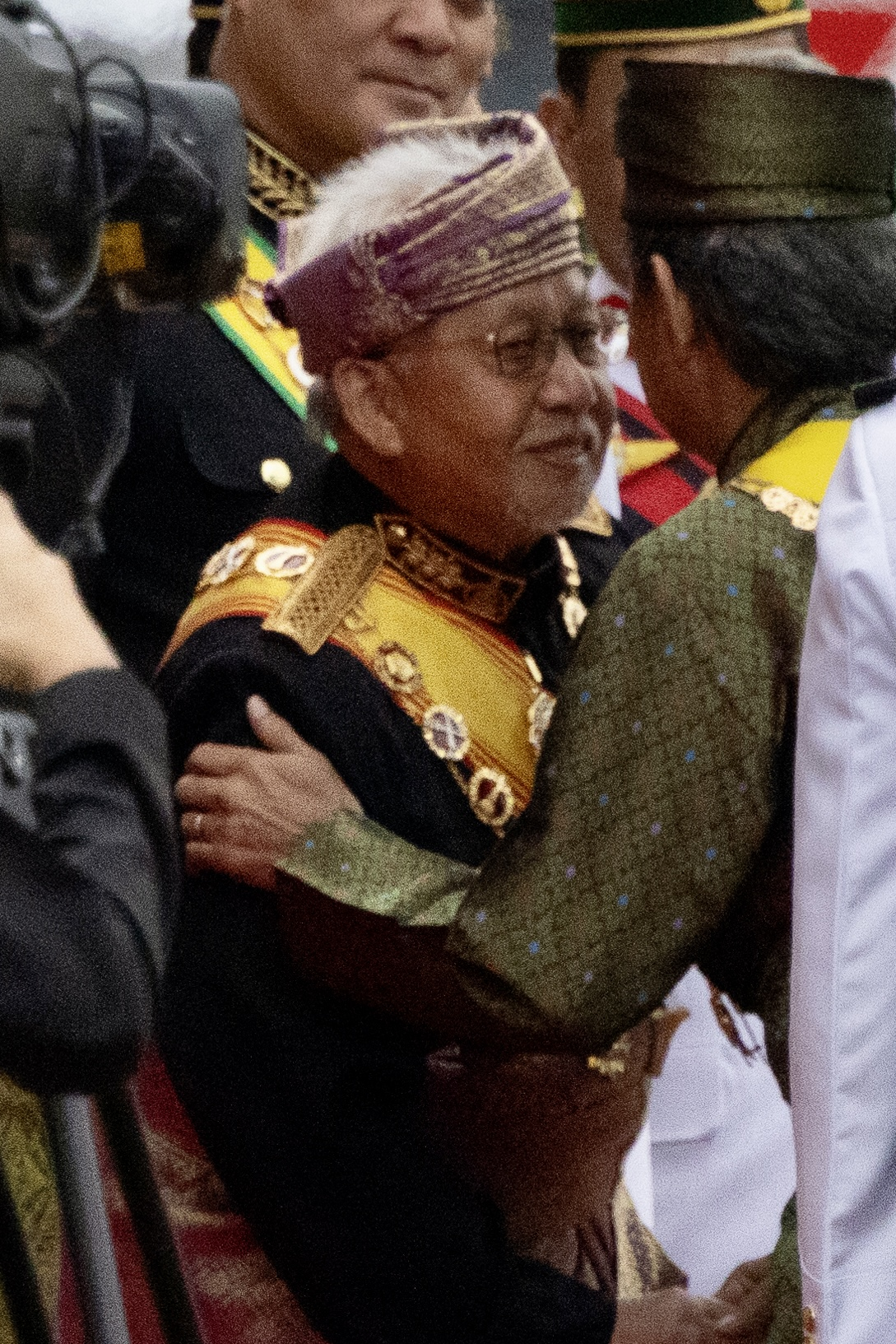
Pengiran Anak Idris, Cheteria 4

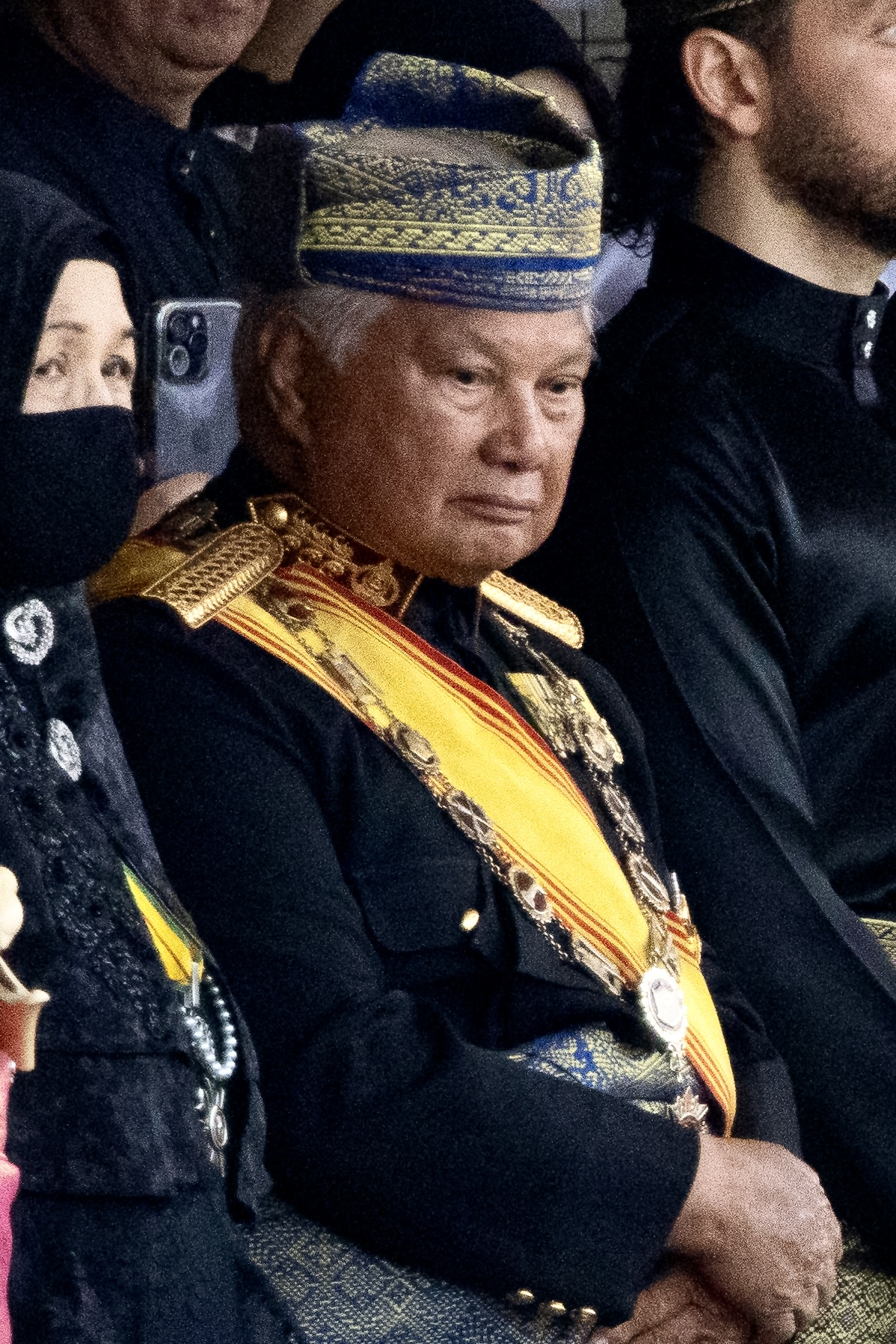
Pengiran Bahrin, Cheteria Tambahan di Bawah Cheteria 16

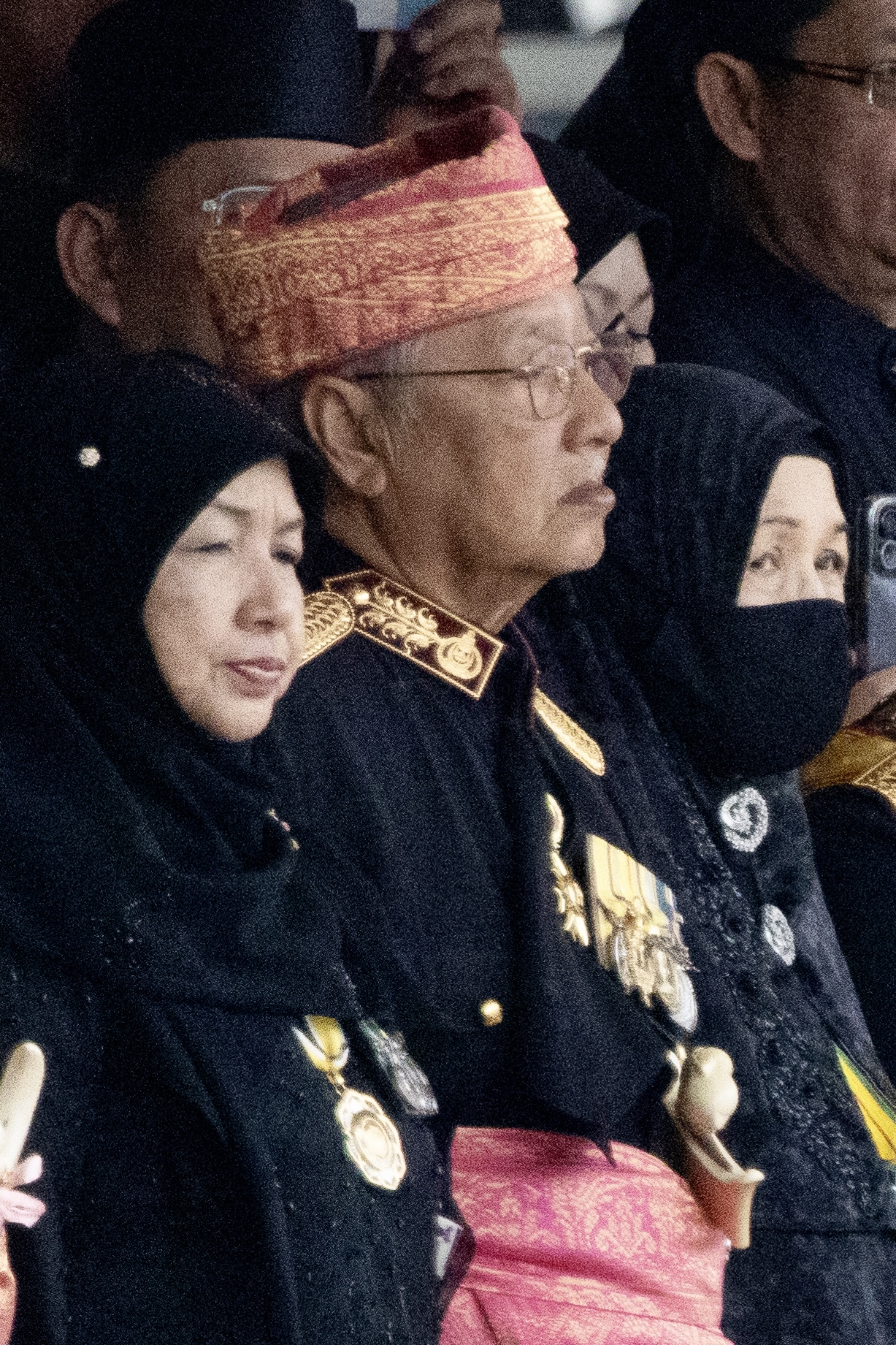
Pengiran Hamdan, Cheteria 32

== Cheteria-cheteria ==
The list of Cheteria is as of 12 May 2023.

Cheteria	Hierarchy	Incumbent	Predecessor
Pengiran Perdana Cheteria Laila Diraja Sahibun Nabalah	Kepala Cheteria	Vacant	Yang Amat Mulia Pengiran Perdana Chateria Laila Diraja Sahibun Nabalah Pengiran Haji Damit bin Pengiran Metussin
Pengiran Lela Cheteria Sahibun Najabah	Kepala Cheteria	Yang Amat Mulia Pengiran Lela Cheteria Sahibun Najabah Pengiran Anak Haji Abdul Aziz bin Pengiran Jaya Negara Pengiran Haji Abu Bakar	Office established
Pengiran Maharaja Lela Sahibul Kahar	Cheteria 4	Vacant	Yang Amat Mulia Pengiran Maharaja Lela Sahibul Kahar Pengiran Anak Haji Mohammad Yusof ibni Al-Marhum Pengiran Pemancha Pengiran Anak Haji Mohamed Alam
Pengiran Indera Setia Diraja Sahibul Karib (Pengiran Paduka Tuan Sahibul Karib)	Cheteria 4	Yang Amat Mulia Pengiran Indera Setia Diraja Sahibul Karib Pengiran Anak Haji Idris bin Pengiran Maharaja Lela Pengiran Muda Abdul Kahar	Yang Amat Mulia Pengiran Paduka Tuan Sahibul Karib Pengiran Haji Abu Bakar ibni Al-Marhum Pengiran Pemancha Pengiran Anak Muhammad Salleh II
Pengiran Maharaja Setia Laila Diraja Sahibul Irshad (Pengiran Maharaja Adinda Sahibul Fikri)	Cheteria 4	Yang Amat Mulia Pengiran Maharaja Setia Laila Diraja Sahibul Irshad Pengiran Anak Haji Abdul Rahim bin Pengiran Indera Mahkota Pengiran Anak (Dr.) Kemaludin Al-Haj	Yang Amat Mulia Pengiran Maharaja Setia Laila Diraja Sahibul Irshad Pengiran Haji Damit bin Pengiran Anak Sabtu
Pengiran Pekerma Setia Diraja Sahibul Bandar (Pengiran Shahbandar Sahibul Bandar)	Cheteria 4	Vacant	Yang Amat Mulia Pengiran Pekerma Setia Diraja Sahibul Bandar Pengiran Haji Muhammad Ali bin Pengiran Haji Muhammad Daud
Pengiran Sanggamara Diraja	Cheteria Tambahan di Bawah Cheteria 4	Yang Amat Mulia Pengiran Sanggamara Diraja Major General (Retired) Pengiran Haji Ibnu Basit bin Pengiran Datu Penghulu Pengiran Haji Apong	Yang Amat Mulia Pengiran Sanggamara Diraja Pengiran Anak Haji Chuchu bin Pengiran Anak Mohd. Salleh
Pengiran Indera Mahkota	Cheteria 8	Vacant	Yang Amat Mulia Pengiran Indera Mahkota Pengiran Anak (Dr.) Kemaluddin Al-Haj ibni Al-Marhum Pengiran Bendahara Pengiran Anak Haji Mohd. Yassin
Pengiran Setia Negara	Cheteria 8	Vacant	Yang Amat Mulia Pengiran Setia Negara Pengiran Haji Muhammad Yusof bin Pengiran Haji Abdul Rahim
Pengiran Putera Negara	Cheteria 8	Vacant	Yang Amat Mulia Pengiran Putera Negara Pengiran Haji Umar bin Pengiran Datu Penghulu Pengiran Haji Apong
Pengiran Indera Negara	Cheteria 8	Yang Amat Mulia Pengiran Indera Negara Pengiran Anak Haji Puteh ibni Al-Marhum Pengiran Pemancha Pengiran Anak Haji Mohamed Alam	Yang Amat Mulia Pengiran Indera Negara Pengiran Anak Haji Tahiruddin bin Pengiran Anak Saifuddin
Pengiran Negara Indera	Cheteria 8	Vacant	Unknown
Pengiran Kesuma Negara	Cheteria 8	Vacant	Yang Amat Mulia Pengiran Kesuma Negara Pengiran Anak Haji Chuchu Besar ibni Al-Marhum Pengiran Bendahara Pengiran Muda Haji Hashim
Pengiran Sura Negara	Cheteria 8	Vacant	Yang Amat Mulia Pengiran Sura Negara Pengiran Anak Haji Muhammad Bey Muntassir bin Pengiran Indera Mahkota Pengiran Anak (Dr.) Kemaludin Al-Haj
Pengiran Siraja (Seri Raja) Muda	Cheteria 8	Vacant	Unknown
Pengiran Maharaja Anakda	Cheteria 16	Vacant	Yang Amat Mulia Pengiran Maharaja Anakda Pengiran Haji Ahmad ibni Al-Marhum Pengiran Bendahara Pengiran Anak Haji Mohd. Yassin
Pengiran Kesuma Indera	Cheteria 16	Vacant	Unknown
Pengiran Jaya Negara	Cheteria 16	Vacant	Yang Amat Mulia Pengiran Jaya Negara Pengiran Haji Abdul Rahman bin Pengiran Haji Abdul Rahim
Pengiran Kerma Negara	Cheteria 16	Vacant	Yang Amat Mulia Pengiran Kerma Negara Pengiran Anak Haji Abdul Wahab bin Pengiran Sabtu Kamaluddin
Pengiran Kerma Indera	Cheteria 16	Vacant	Yang Amat Mulia Pengiran Kerma Indera Pengiran Anak Tajuddin bin Pengiran Haji Momin
Pengiran Dipa Negara Laila Diraja	Cheteria 16	Vacant	Yang Amat Mulia Pengiran Dipa Negara Laila Diraja Pengiran Haji Abdul Momin bin Pengiran Haji Ismail
Pengiran Dewa Negara	Cheteria 16	Vacant	Unknown
Pengiran Seri Maharaja	Cheteria 16	Vacant	Yang Amat Mulia Pengiran Seri Maharaja Pengiran Anak Omar Ali ibni Al-Marhum Pengiran Bendahara Pengiran Anak Abdul Rahman
Pengiran Kerma Raja	Cheteria 16	Yang Amat Mulia Pengiran Kerma Raja Pengiran Haji Kamarulzaman bin Pengiran Pekerma Setia Diraja Pengiran Haji Ali	Unknown
Pengiran Derma Wangsa	Cheteria 16	Vacant	Unknown
Pengiran Derma Putera	Cheteria 16	Vacant	Yang Amat Mulia Pengiran Derma Putera Pengiran Haji Damit bin Pengiran Anak Sabtu
Pengiran Jaya Kesuma	Cheteria 16	Vacant	Unknown
Pengiran Jaya Indera	Cheteria 16	Vacant	Yang Amat Mulia Pengiran Jaya Indera Pengiran Haji Mokhtar Puteh bin Pengiran Haji Rajid
Pengiran Seri Rama	Cheteria 16	Vacant	Unknown
Pengiran Seri Dewa	Cheteria 16	Vacant	Unknown
Pengiran Maharaja Dewa	Cheteria 16	Vacant	Unknown
Pengiran Penggawa Laila Bentara Istiadat Diraja Dalam Istana	Cheteria Tambahan di Bawah Cheteria 16	Yang Amat Mulia Pengiran Penggawa Laila Bentara Istiadat Diraja Dalam Istana Pengiran Haji Alauddin bin Pengiran Paduka Tuan Pengiran Haji Abu Bakar	Yang Amat Mulia Pengiran Penggawa Laila Bentara Istiadat Diraja Dalam Istana Pengiran Haji Mokhtar Puteh bin Pengiran Haji Rajid
Pengiran Laila Kanun Diraja	Cheteria Tambahan di Bawah Cheteria 16	Yang Amat Mulia Pengiran Laila Kanun Diraja Pengiran Haji Bahrin bin Pengiran Haji Abbas	Office established
Pengiran Dewa Maharaja	Cheteria 32	Vacant	Unknown
Pengiran Kerma Dewa	Cheteria 32	Vacant	Unknown
Pengiran Indera Dewa	Cheteria 32	Vacant	Unknown
Pengiran Seri Lela	Cheteria 32	Vacant	Unknown
Pengiran Seri Ratna	Cheteria 32	Vacant	Unknown
Pengiran Seri Utama	Cheteria 32	Vacant	Unknown
Pengiran Seri Negara	Cheteria 32	Vacant	Unknown
Pengiran Derma Wijaya	Cheteria 32	Vacant	Unknown
Pengiran Setia Raja	Cheteria 32	Vacant	Yang Amat Mulia Pengiran Setia Raja Pengiran Haji Jaya bin Pengiran Haji Rajid
Pengiran Lela Negara	Cheteria 32	Vacant	Yang Amat Mulia Pengiran Lela Negara Pengiran Haji Mohammad ibni Al-Marhum Pengiran Bendahara Pengiran Anak Abdul Rahman
Pengiran Paduka Ratna	Cheteria 32	Vacant	Unknown
Pengiran Paduka Raja	Cheteria 32	Vacant	Unknown
Pengiran Mahawangsa	Cheteria 32	Vacant	Unknown
Pengiran Jaya Perkasa	Cheteria 32	Vacant	Yang Amat Mulia Pengiran Jaya Perkasa Pengiran Anak Haji Mohd. Hassan bin Pengiran Sabtu Kamaluddin
Pengiran Ratna Indera	Cheteria 32	Vacant	Unknown
Pengiran Ratna Negara	Cheteria 32	Vacant	Unknown
Pengiran Indera Perkasa	Cheteria 32	Yang Amat Mulia Pengiran Indera Perkasa Pengiran Haji Hamdan bin Pengiran Haji Ismail	Unknown
Pengiran Laila Raja	Cheteria 32	Vacant	Yang Amat Mulia Pengiran Pengiran Laila Raja Pengiran Haji Buntar bin Pengiran Mohammad Ja'afar
Pengiran Setia Jaya	Cheteria 32	Vacant	Yang Amat Mulia Pengiran Setia Jaya Pengiran Pengiran Haji Abdul Momin bin Pengiran Othman
Pengiran Ratna Wangsa	Cheteria 32	Vacant	Yang Amat Mulia Pengiran Ratna Wangsa Pengiran Haji Metussin bin Pengiran Abdul Rahman Piut
Pengiran Lela Perkasa	Cheteria 32	Vacant	Yang Amat Mulia Pengiran Lela Perkasa Pengiran Haji Mohd Said bin Pengiran Jaya Negara Pengiran Haji Abu Bakar
Pengiran Lela Wijaya	Cheteria 32	Vacant	Yang Amat Mulia Pengiran Lela Wijaya Pengiran Haji Yussof bin Pengiran Limbang
Pengiran Kerma Wijaya	Cheteria 32	Vacant	Unknown
Pengiran Jaya Petra	Cheteria 32	Vacant	Yang Amat Mulia Pengiran Jaya Petra Pengiran Haji Ahmad bin Pengiran Luba
Pengiran Paduka Dewa	Cheteria 32	Vacant	Unknown
Pengiran Paduka Indera	Cheteria 32	Vacant	Yang Amat Mulia Pengiran Paduka Indera Pengiran Haji Abu Bakar bin Pengiran Mohammad
Pengiran Seri Indera	Cheteria 32	Vacant	Yang Amat Mulia Pengiran Seri Indera Pengiran Haji Ismail bin Pengiran Haji Mohammad
Pengiran Ratna Wijaya	Cheteria 32	Yang Amat Mulia Pengiran Ratna Wijaya Brigadier General (Retired) Pengiran Haji Hasnan bin Pengiran Ahmad	Unknown
Pengiran Indera Wijaya	Cheteria 32	Yang Amat Mulia Pengiran Indera Wijaya Pengiran (Dr.) Haji Ismail bin Pengiran Haji Damit	Unknown
Pengiran Seri Wijaya	Cheteria 32	Vacant	Yang Amat Mulia Pengiran Seri Wijaya Pengiran Haji Ahmad bin Pengiran Mohd. Yusof
Pengiran Ratna Perkasa	Cheteria 32	Vacant	Unknown
Pengiran Lela Utama	Cheteria 32	Vacant	Yang Amat Mulia Pengiran Lela Utama Pengiran Haji Mohd. Said bin Pengiran Ahmad

== See also ==
- Wazir
- Manteri
- Council of Cabinet Ministers
