= Royal Brunei Police Force =

Royal Brunei Police Force Polis Di-Raja Brunei ڤوليس دراج بروني
- Logo of the Royal Brunei Police

- Flag of the Royal Brunei Police
- Abbreviation: RBPF / PDB
- Motto: Cepat dan Sempurna; Fast and Perfect

Agency overview
- Formed: 1 January 1921
- Employees: 4,400 personnel

Jurisdictional structure
- National agency (Operations jurisdiction): Brunei
- International agency: Brunei
- Countries: Brunei
- Operations jurisdiction: Brunei
- Area: 5,765 square kilometres (2,226 sq mi)
- Legal jurisdiction: Brunei
- Governing body: Prime Minister's Office
- General nature: Local civilian police

Operational structure
- Headquarters: Bandar Seri Begawan
- Agency executives: Dato Seri Pahlawan Sulaiman bin Alidin, Commissioner of Police; Yang Amat Mulia Pengiran Anak Haji Mohammed Saifullah bin Pengiran Indera Setia Diraja Sahibul Karib Pengiran Anak Haji Idris, Deputy Commissioner of Police

Facilities
- Stations: 13
- Police cars: Mitsubishi Lancer, Mitsubishi Pajero, Toyota Corolla, Toyota Vios, Chevrolet Epica etc.
- Patrol Boats: Interceptor, Passenger speed boat V.36, half cabin fiber glass boat, fiberglass boat V.26, patrol boat, rigid inflatable hull boat, aluminum boat, catamaran

Website
- www.police.gov.bn

The Royal Brunei Police Force, RBPF (Malay: Polis Diraja Brunei (PDB) is in charge of keeping law and order in Brunei. The RBPF has been one of the 190 members of INTERPOL, an intergovernmental organisation worldwide since 1984.

With a force of more than 4,400 officers, the RBPF is responsible for keeping law and order and providing law enforcement services. The mandate for the RBPF in keeping the law in the Sultanate of Brunei Darussalam includes the prevention, detection and investigation of crime, collection of criminal intelligence, traffic control, escort duties (VIPs, cash, prisoners), sea and border patrol, public order, riot as well as public event control.

== History ==
=== Early history ===
Before the British Residency introduced a formal policing system in 1906, Brunei's national security and communal peace were managed by thirteen government officers, most notably the Pengiran Temenggong. This official not only ensured land and marine security but also served as the sultan's escort on his journeys, leading the royal entourage with a symbolic token, followed by Sakai attendants. Beyond his role as protector, the Pengiran Temenggong held judicial authority, commanded Brunei's armed forces during wartime, and was empowered by the Brunei Code of Law to impose severe penalties, including the death penalty, without requiring prior approval from the sultan.

As both chief judge and chief enforcer, the Pengiran Temenggong handled an extensive array of responsibilities that encompassed judicial, administrative, and security affairs. His duties spanned law enforcement, naval command, governance of newly acquired territories, and overseeing public order, including the maintenance of roads, buildings, and other municipal structures. During royal processions, he symbolically led the entourage, often riding on the head of an elephant in front of the sultan. By upholding law and order and suppressing potential revolts, he effectively functioned as Brunei's chief of police before the formal establishment of a police force. This role mirrored the Temenggong's position in other Malay states, where he wielded broad authority in state administration, contributing significantly to governance and stability.

=== Road to establishment (1906–1921) ===
In 1906, two officers from the Straits Settlements Police Force were assigned to Brunei Town, now known as Bandar Seri Begawan, marking the beginning of Brunei's police history. This arrangement stemmed from the strong administrative ties between Brunei and the Colony of Labuan, a territory that had been ceded to Britain in 1846. From April 1906, Labuan was governed under the Straits Settlements, with Resident McArthur overseeing both Labuan and Brunei. Due to financial difficulties, Brunei's government effectively merged with that of Labuan, facilitating shared control and resources until 1921.

Under Resident McArthur, the history of Brunei's police force became closely intertwined with its administrative union with the Colony of Labuan. Brunei lacked the infrastructure and resources to support British authorities, including a chief police officer (CPO), on its own. Consequently, the Straits Settlements Police Force initially provided support, which extended to police administration as well. This collaboration was made possible because Labuan had superior facilities. Additionally, Brunei's low level of education resulted in a shortage of skilled local workers, emphasising the need for pooled resources. A small police station and prison were established within the British Resident's Office (BRO). The resident oversaw the police force until 1908, after which the Labuan CPO took command until 1920.

Between 1906 and 1920, Brunei's police force steadily expanded in response to increasing demands for crime control and governance. However, due to a lack of local involvement and general inexperience with formal policing, the force, initially staffed by Sikh and Malay officers from the Straits Settlements Police in Labuan, struggled to gain community trust. Slow educational development further limited the pool of eligible local candidates, complicating local recruitment. Although serious crimes were infrequent, the police faced challenges in raising public awareness and reporting, with village leaders often addressing smaller issues. Nonetheless, by 1919, interest in police employment grew, spurred by the positive image portrayed by Malay officers from the Straits Settlements, leading to an increasing waiting list for recruits.

The early police force in Brunei primarily supported local authorities in enforcing laws and maintaining public order, with responsibilities that included protecting government buildings and official residences. Legislative measures such as the Firearms Enactment (1916) and the Alien Registration Enactment (1920) expanded the police's duties and role in ensuring state security. Early policemen were primarily drawn from the Straits Settlements Police Force due to the low literacy rates and lack of police training among residents. In response to rising crime complaints, the police presence increased from 12 officers in 1906 to a more widespread deployment throughout Brunei, with personnel assigned to regions such as Muara, Tutong, Belait, and eventually Temburong. By 1915, an increase in funding, aligned with the rise in the country's revenue, allowed for further development of police infrastructure in both urban and rural areas.

As crime rates in Brunei rose, the police budget was increased to accommodate the growth in personnel, facilities, and equipment. Initially, the BRO in Brunei Town served as the sole police station and barracks. By 1907, despite the Brooke family's mining concessions at the Brooketon Colliery, the British Resident expanded the police presence, establishing additional stations and barracks in strategic locations such as Kuala Balai and Tutong. A new station for Sikh officers from the Straits Settlements was constructed in Muara in 1910, and additional barracks were built in Temburong by 1918. The barracks at BRO were relocated to Brunei Town in 1920, and the number of police posts grew from four stations in 1907 to include Temburong by 1915, eventually extending to the Labu and Rangau regions.

Between 1906 and 1920, the police force faced several challenges, including issues of discipline, a lack of resources, and delays in crime reporting. The force's reputation suffered due to disciplinary incidents, such as the intoxication of Indian officers in 1908 and a general lack of interest among some Malay officers in 1909. Ineffective policing was compounded by inadequate infrastructure, limited investigative tools, and difficulties in recruitment. Crimes such as theft, murder, assault, smuggling, and property offenses were on the rise, prompting calls for a dedicated police force in Brunei. This demand intensified after a Sikh policeman from Labuan killed British resident E. B. Maundrell in 1916. In 1920, reliance on the Straits Settlements police ended when the government passed legislation to establish a distinct Brunei Police Force, with Chief Inspector F. Mann appointed as its head effective 1 January 1921.

=== Further developments (1921–1941) ===
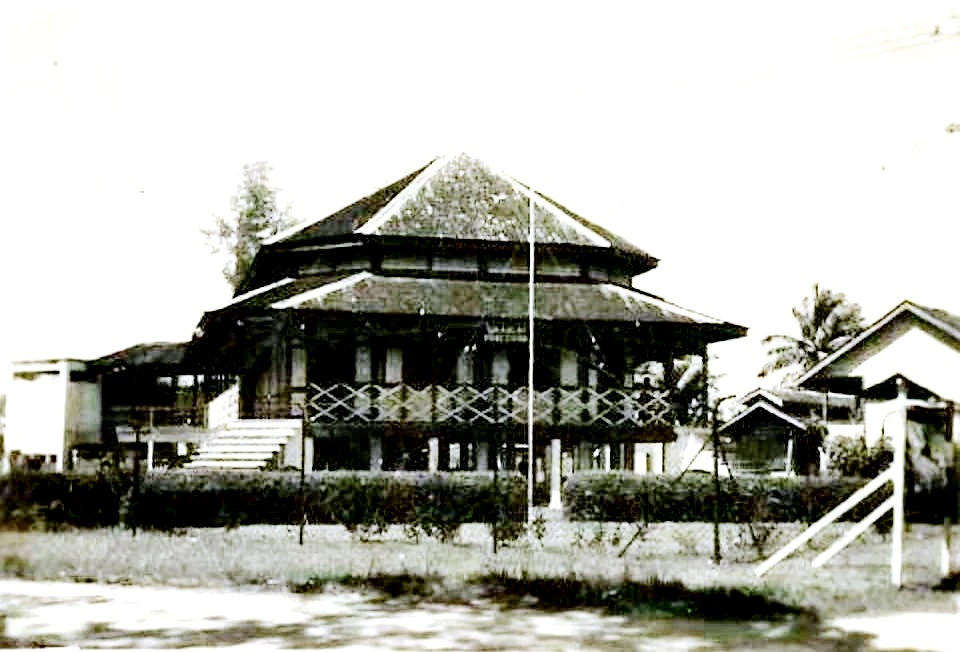
Kuala Belait's police station in 1933

After the Police Force Enactment was approved on 22 December 1920, the government was authorised to establish its own police force in anticipation of Brunei's autonomy from the Straits Settlements administration in 1921, leading to the official formation of the Brunei Police Force. This decision was driven by Brunei's growing population, which rose from 21,718 in 1911 to 25,454 in 1921, alongside a significant increase in resource export earnings, which climbed from $51,777 in 1907 to $201,250 in 1920. The murder of British resident E. B. Maundrell by a Sikh police officer underscored the urgent need for local governance. The Police Force Enactment, consisting of 12 pages and 42 clauses, came into effect on 1 January 1921, outlining the administration, roles, and conduct of police officers, while granting the Resident authority to implement regulatory changes for effectiveness and accountability.

Following this enactment, the Brunei Police Force underwent a significant transformation between 1921 and 1941, evolving into a fully independent organization distinct from the Straits Settlements Police Force. Despite this separation, the Brunei Police Force continued to rely on personnel from the Straits Settlements due to a lack of qualified local applicants for senior roles. This dependence on external expertise was crucial for developing a capable police force, as local staff needed training and guidance to advance their careers.

During this period, the Brunei Police Force experienced changes in financing, infrastructure, logistics, human resources, and administration. Rapid economic growth and demographic shifts from Brunei's oil discoveries complicated policing amid an expanding population and rising crime rates. In response, the Brunei Police Force expanded its responsibilities and provided training in fundamental enforcement techniques. Recognising the importance of education, the force established a constable class to enhance officers' skills and offered allowances to those who could read and write.

Between 1921 and 1941, the Brunei Police Force gradually earned the trust of the local population through efforts to maintain a positive image and enhance officer effectiveness. Although the number of recorded incidents increased, the types of criminal cases remained consistent with those from 1906 to 1920, and the police successfully managed rising crime rates. The government's cooperation with the police, including the issuance of identification certificates in 1934 and the approval of new laws, helped regulate criminal activity and build public confidence.

During this time, the Brunei Police Force was predominantly staffed by officers from the Straits Settlements. While local recruitment efforts began, there was a shortage of qualified candidates for higher positions. British officers continued to hold top ranks, although Pengiran Damit bin Pengiran Omar Ali and Awang Ibrahim bin Nudin became the first Bruneians to attain the rank of sergeant major in 1934. With support from Sergeant Major Muhammad Daud, Inspector F. Mann became the first European CPO after the separation from the Straits Settlements Police Force. Chief Inspector G. C. McAfee addressed efficiency issues by implementing allowances for literate officers and establishing a shooting range in 1923, while a spy class was introduced in 1931 under Inspector H. J. Spinks to improve educational standards among police officers.

=== World War II and aftermath (1941–1959) ===
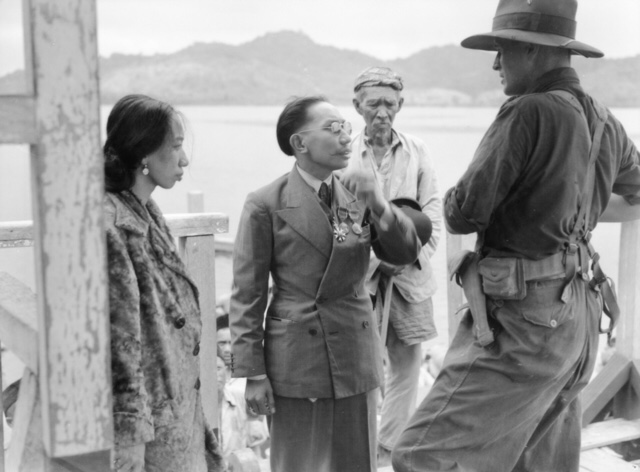
Wing Commander K. E. H. Kay greeting Sultan Ahmad Tajuddin and Tengku Raihani in 1945

The Brunei Police Force experienced significant transformation during the Japanese occupation from December 1941 to June 1945, following a swift Japanese takeover. British officers were detained, dismantling the existing police hierarchy, and local commanders like Sergeant Major Ibrahim bin Nudin were appointed temporarily before Japanese officers took command. The police were reorganised to support Japanese aims, emphasising discipline and loyalty. The Kempetai, the Japanese military police, assumed control over criminal cases, reducing the Brunei police's function.

Despite local resentment and operational challenges, the Brunei Police Force continued under Japanese rule, retaining limited duties like shooting classes and basic training. However, cooperation with the Japanese diminished their effectiveness; crime rates rose, and public trust declined. Many residents viewed the police as enforcers of Japanese authority rather than community protectors. The end of the occupation in June 1945 marked a turning point, allowing for the eventual rebuilding and reform of the Brunei police.

From 10 June 1945 to 5 June 1946, Brunei was under British Military Administration, focusing on reconstructing infrastructure, especially police facilities damaged during the war. The British restructured the police, appointing local Sergeant Pengiran Sabtu and Captain Monk as CPO. Though short-lived, British control helped maintain security, particularly amid rising tensions between Chinese and Malay communities. Limited resources restricted force expansion, prioritising essential government services over police training.

On 6 July 1946, the British Army transferred Brunei's control to the British Resident, retaining the existing police structure. With Stephen Liew Kee Soon as the first local probation inspector, emphasis shifted to local leadership. Assistant Superintendent H. J. Spinks, from the Straits Settlements Police, served as CPO until 1949. The police headquarters moved from Jalan Stoney to Jalan Pemancha in 1947. The British aimed to integrate Brunei with larger territories like Sarawak and North Borneo, gradually replacing Straits Settlements personnel with officers from Sarawak after a 1948 agreement. This transition addressed budgetary constraints and prepared Brunei for new administrative structures.

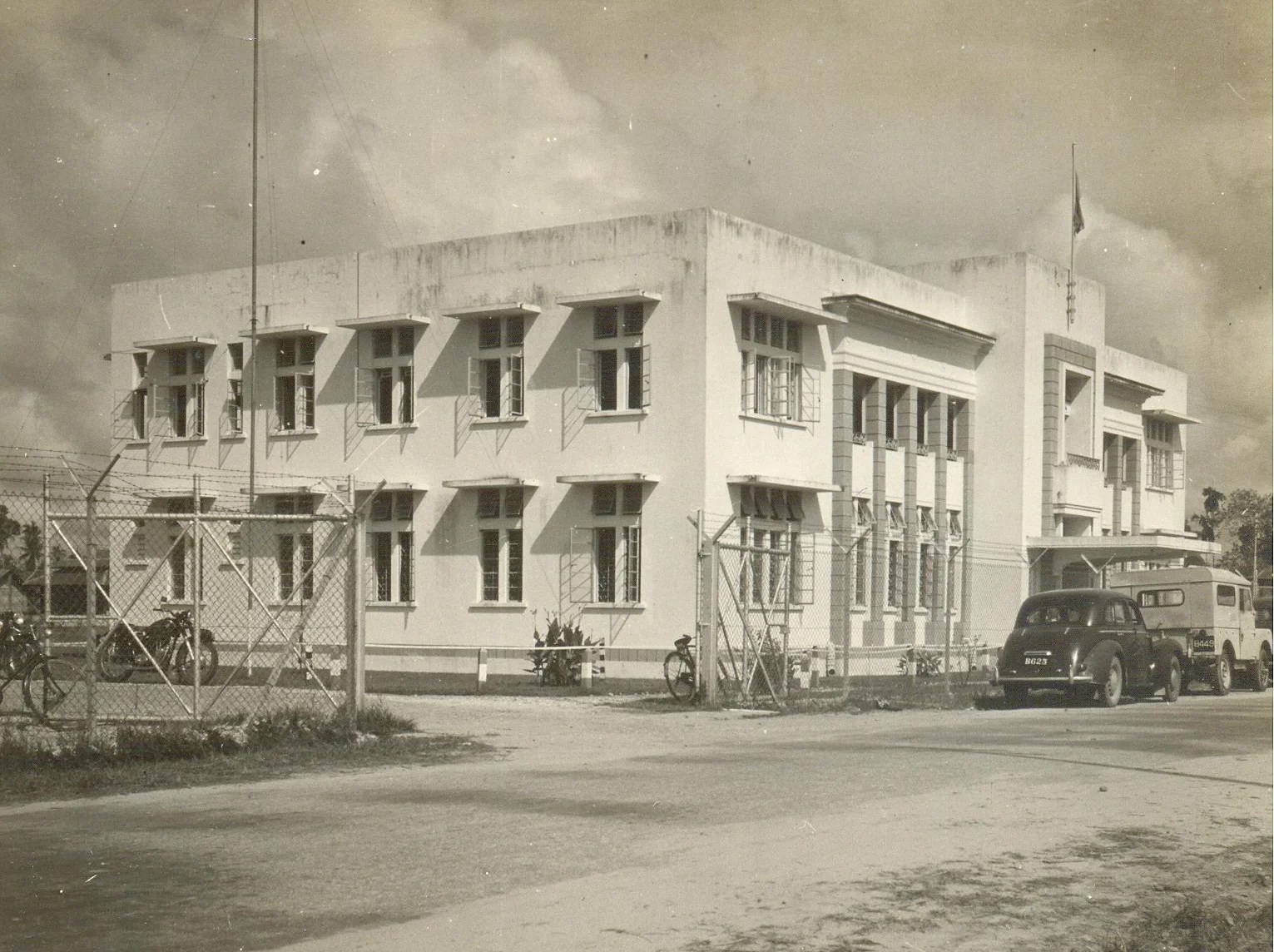
Brunei Town's police station in 1955

From 1949 to 1958, the police expanded in response to Brunei's physical growth and rising crime. The Special Police Force, first established in 1939, was reactivated, and the Criminal Investigation Department (CID) was introduced on 1 December 1950. The CID focused on intelligence, while the Special Police provided emergency support. District Police were created to manage security needs amid a growing population and influx of foreign workers. The police headquarters moved to Kuala Belait in 1950, returning to Brunei Town in 1955, and a new headquarters was approved in 1958. Following the 1951 dissolution of the Brunei–Muara Police Company, the Brunei Police assumed responsibilities for securing oil fields and other government functions, such as immigration and land transport.

=== Constitution to independence (1959–1984) ===
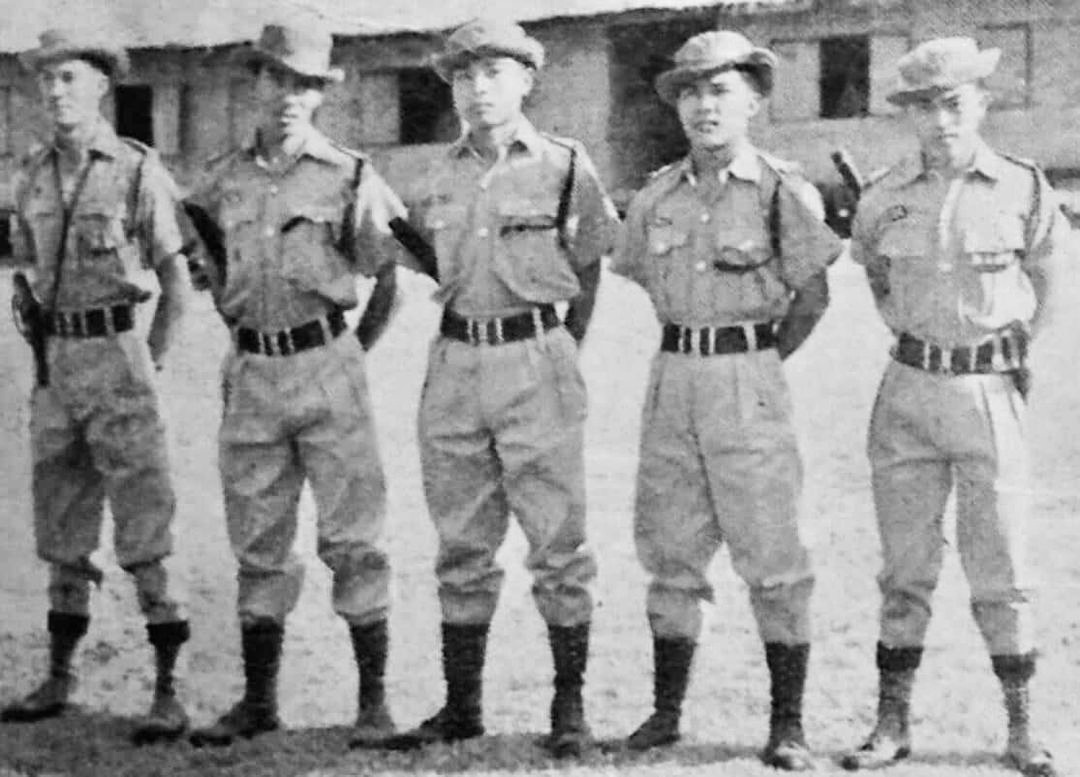
Bruneian police officers in 1961

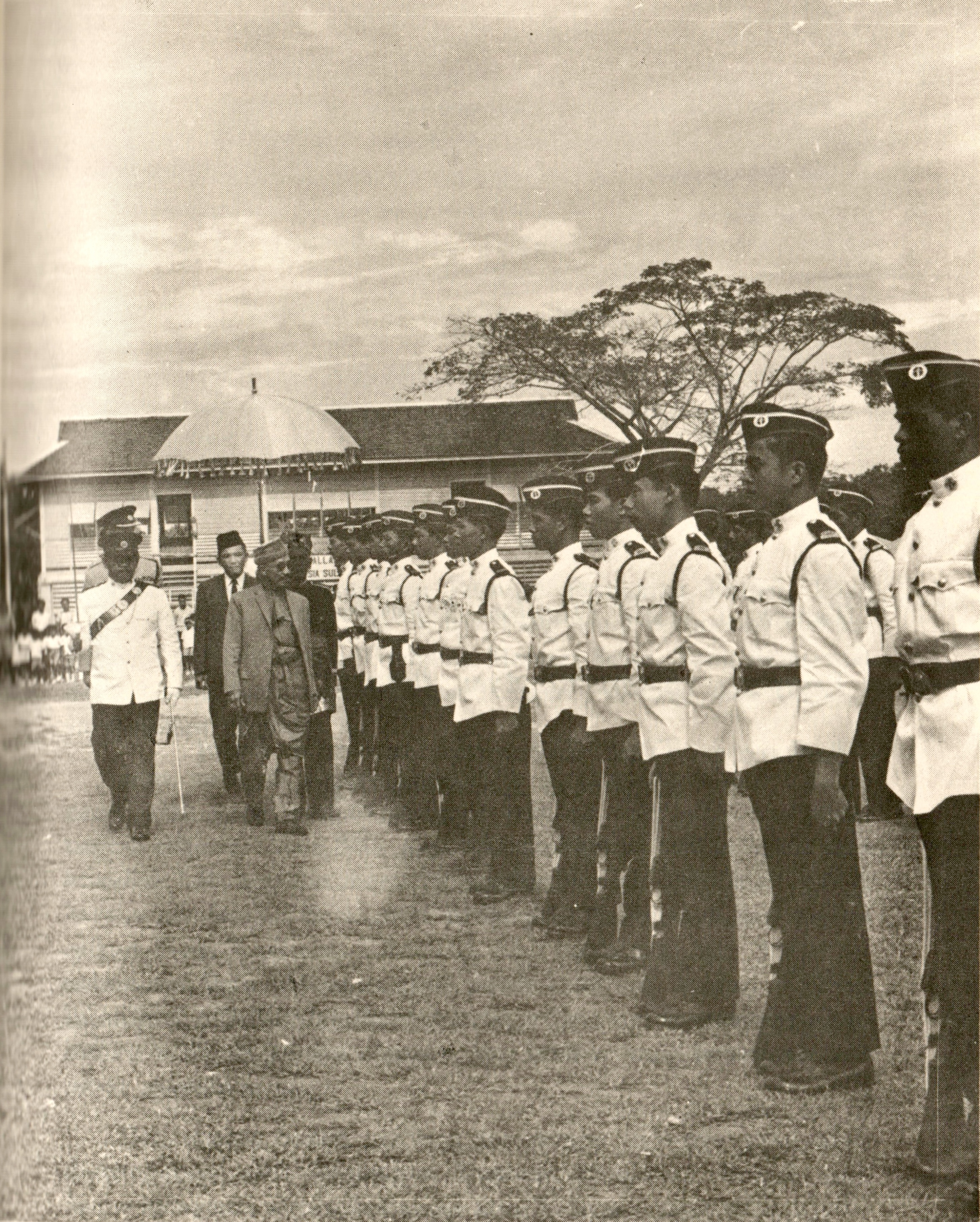
Sultan Omar Ali Saifuddien III inspecting the police guard of honour in Tutong, 1964

With the adoption of the Brunei Constitution on 29 September 1959, leadership within the Brunei Police Force shifted dramatically, transitioning from a CPO recruited from the Sarawak Constabulary to a locally appointed commissioner of police. Along with specifying defence provisions, the constitution formalised a partnership with the British Government to support recruitment and training of police officers. A new police headquarters in Gadong was completed in 1968 to accommodate the growing force, which expanded its branches throughout the 1960s, establishing the Mobile Reserve Force, Oilfield Security Force, and Traffic Branch to improve operational efficiency.

Following the Anglo–Brunei Agreement in 1971, Brunei gained full control over its internal affairs, and Sultan Hassanal Bolkiah was appointed inspector general of police on 14 August 1971. Meanwhile, Prince Mohamed Bolkiah was appointed honorary police commissioner on 23 September 1974. In celebration of the police force's 50th anniversary, he awarded it the title "Royal" - in recognition to its half century of service, inclusive of actions during the 1962 Brunei Revolt, and introduced a new service emblem. Under Commissioner Burns and Deputy Pengiran Jaya, the RBPF continued its growth in 1975 by establishing the Women's Police Unit, Marine Police Branch, and Airport Police Branch. Recruitment of female officers began in 1974, with Princess Masna as the female police commander and Princess Nor'ain as deputy. This was spurred by an increase in cases involving women and children, along with shifting societal norms and international policing trends.

To combat rising smuggling activities, the Marine Police Branch was founded in 1975, patrolling waters and rivers, while the Airport Police, created in 1974, managed security at the new Brunei International Airport. The Logistics and Communication Unit, formed in 1978, centralised operations, further improving efficiency. Between 1959 and 1983, the RBPF expanded significantly, with the number of police stations increasing from eight in 1962 to fourteen by 1978. Upon Brunei's independence in 1984, the RBPF began a new chapter, evolving to support the country's aspirations with significant internal reforms.

=== Post-independence (1984–2004) ===
Under the direction of the Prime Minister's Office, the RBPF incorporated the Melayu Islam Beraja concept and Islamic management practices into its operations between 1984 and 2004, reflecting the cultural values of the government. Sultan Hassanal Bolkiah was the inspector general, and the administrative hub was the Gadong Police Headquarters. The force reorganised and grew in 1995, adding five departments—including Operations, Intelligence, and Criminal Investigation—to handle the complexity of crime, including cybercrime and terrorism. In 2000, more improvements were made, restructuring certain groups and creating others like Interpol and Public Relations. In order to handle specialised tasks, the force further separated sections and increased its workforce by 2004. This created a more flexible and effective organisational structure that could accommodate Brunei's changing security requirements.

The Logistics, Administration, and Operations Departments of the RBPF underwent major renovations between 2000 and 2004 in order to improve efficiency and adjust to changing security requirements. Before restructuring into four divisions by 2004, the Logistics Department had grown to manage duties across six sections, including communications, building maintenance, and airport security tools. In a similar vein, the Administration and Finance Department expanded from managing public relations and basic training to managing eight specialized divisions, including project maintenance, IT, and finance. From a basic traffic branch, the Traffic Investigation and Control Department developed into a full-fledged department with planning, investigation, and operational sections. The Operations Department, on the other hand, consolidated several patrol and security units after initially concentrating on sectors such as oilfield and airport security. By 2004, it included five divisions, each of which was responsible for a distinct aspect of national and royal security.

Under Pengiran Umar's leadership, community-based programs like Project Village Neighbourhood Watch and the Police Station and Police Post Beauty Competition were started to improve public relations, and the PEKERTI association was founded in 1985 to promote unity among police families. By creating many directorates and expanding police command districts, Commissioner Abdul Rahman Besar administratively reorganised the force. Advanced technologies, including as the Police On-Line System, LATIS, and the ASEANAPOL Database, were implemented under Commissioner Ya'akub Zainal to facilitate quick information sharing and interagency cooperation. In response to an increase in instances, Ya'akub also created a Crime Investigation Unit for Women and Children in 1997. Later, in 2001, Commissioner Abdul Rahman Johan led consistent upgrades in accordance with national identification and implemented the Automated Fingerprint Identification System (AFIS) to increase investigation efficiency. With the help of facilities supplied by the government, the police commissioners played a crucial role in advancing the force's service standards and bringing it into line with Brunei's changing social, political, and economic environment during these transitions.

=== Police Centennial ===
Despite the ongoing COVID-19 Pandemic, the RBPF officially marked its Centennial in 2021.

On 17 January 2025, in celebration of the 104th Police Day, the RBPF was finally presented with its King's Colour in recognition of more than a century of service to monarch and country.

== Organisation structure ==
1. Commissioner

(The Secretariat Office of the Police Commissioner)

2. Deputy Commissioner

Departments

1. General Administration and Finance Department

The department consists of 4 units:

i) General Administration and Finance Division

ii) Training Unit

iii) Membership and Career Planning Division

iv) Purchasing and Supply Unit

2. Logistics Department

Logistics Department roles & responsibilities:

i) To ensure sufficient needs for the team.

ii) To protect the assets of the team.

iii) To provide technical assistance.

iv) To prepare the Country's Development Plan Project.

v) To prepare the Annual Budget.

3. Criminal Intelligence Department

Functions and Roles:

i) To provide timely and accurate criminal intelligence.

ii) To provide crime statistics and daily crime report.

iii) To prepare threat assessments and intelligence reports among others on crime situation, national events, state visits by VVIPs and many more.

iv) To monitor and analyse local and international affairs which may pose a security threat to the country.

v) To issue security passes and process crime-scene films and photographs. 4. Criminal Investigation Department

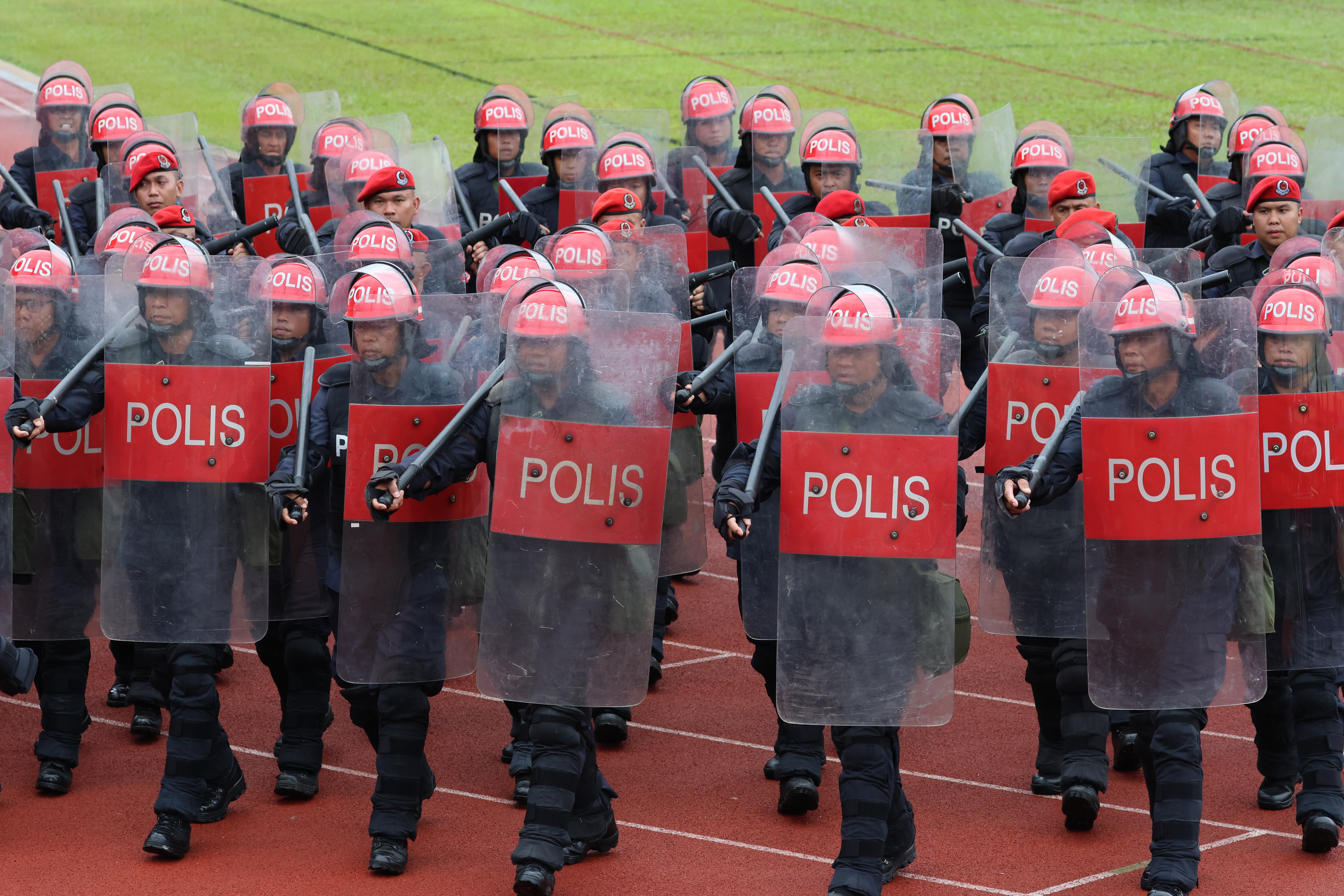
Riot police marching on National Day of Brunei 2024

Functions & Roles

i) To enforce law and order of the country

ii) To provide service to the community

iii) To prevent crime

iv) To apprehend offenders

v) To conduct investigations on cases relating to offences breaking the law and acts.

5. Operations Department

The Operations Department of the Royal Brunei Police Force is responsible on all aspects of operations in the areas of security and control aside from playing the role of enforcing the laws of the nation.

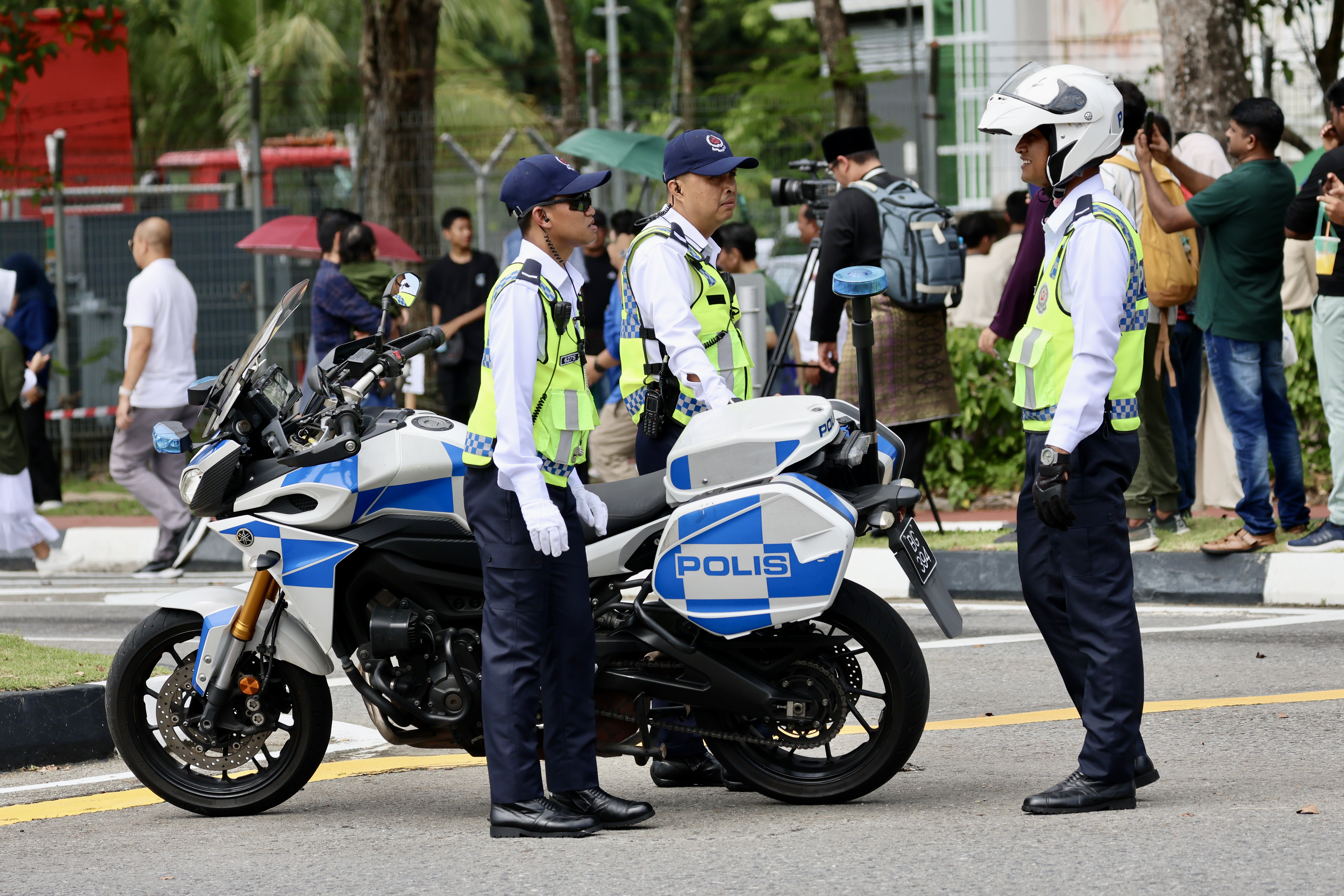
Traffic police on duty in Pusat Bandar

6. Traffic Control and Investigation Department

The roles of this department are quite diverse, among them are:

i) To investigate and charge road traffic offenders.

ii) To conduct operations and road enforcements.

iii) To provide required assistance to road users while patrolling.

iv) To conduct road safety campaign and awareness programmes.

v) To provide motorcycle escort and other escort services to local and foreign VVIP.

Police sub-divisions

1. Brunei and Muara District Police

2. Tutong District Police

3. Belait District Police

4. Temburong District Police

5. Police Training Centre

== Ranks ==
Royal Brunei Police Force Commissioner Ranks and Insignia
Rank	Inspector general of police	Deputy inspector general of police	Commissioner	Deputy commissioner	Senior assistant commissioner	Assistant commissioner
Insignia (since 2004)						
Insignia (pre-2004)						

Royal Brunei Police Force Officer Ranks and Insignia
Rank	Senior superintendent	Superintendent	Deputy superintendent	Assistant superintendent	Senior inspector	Inspector	Probationary inspector	Cadet inspector
Insignia (since 2004)								
Insignia (pre-2004)								

Royal Brunei Police Force Other Ranks and Insignia
Rank	Sergeant major	Staff sergeant	Sergeant	Corporal	Lance corporal	Police
Insignia (since 2004)						No Insignia
Insignia (pre-2004)						No Insignia

== Equipment ==
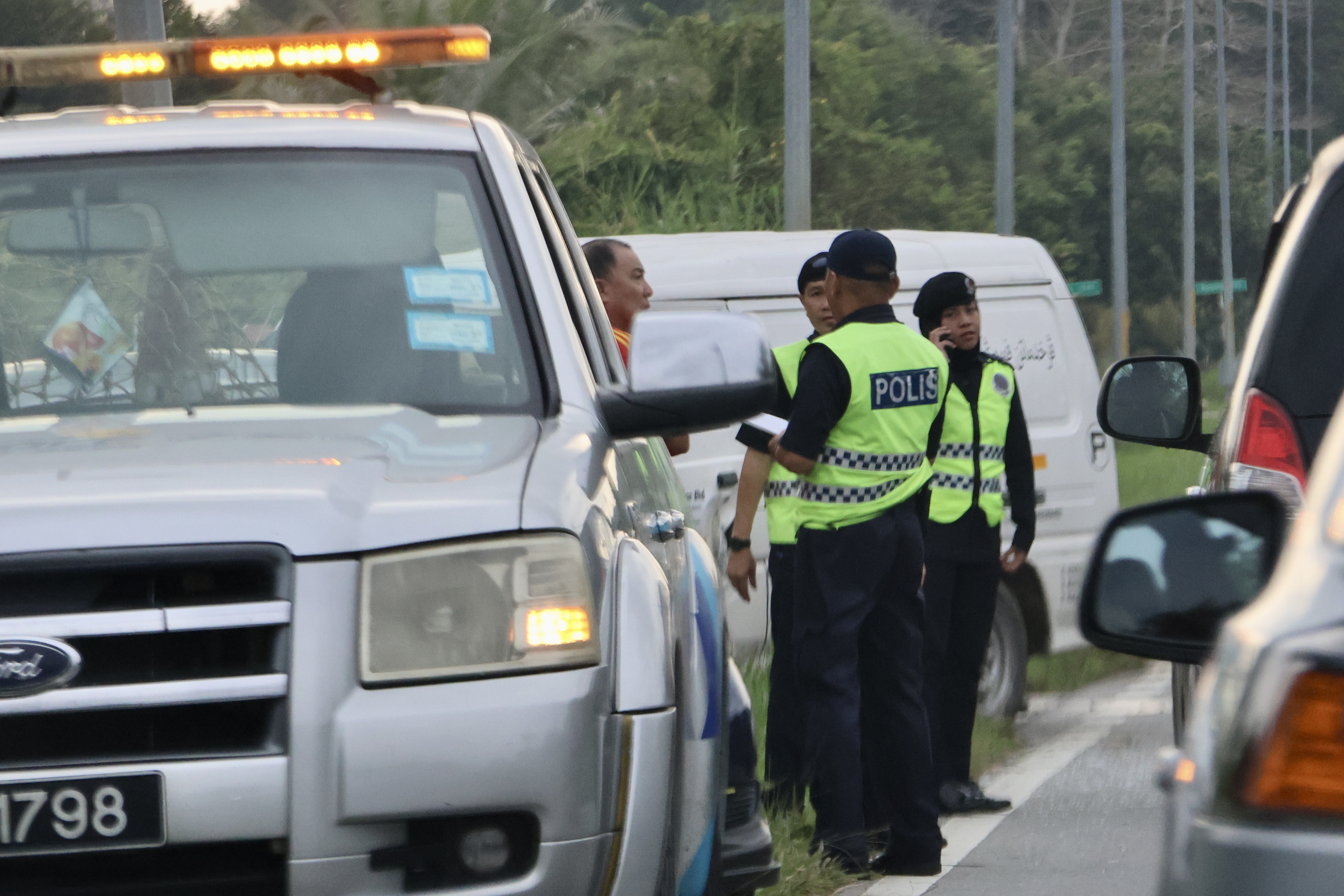
Police officers at a traffic accident

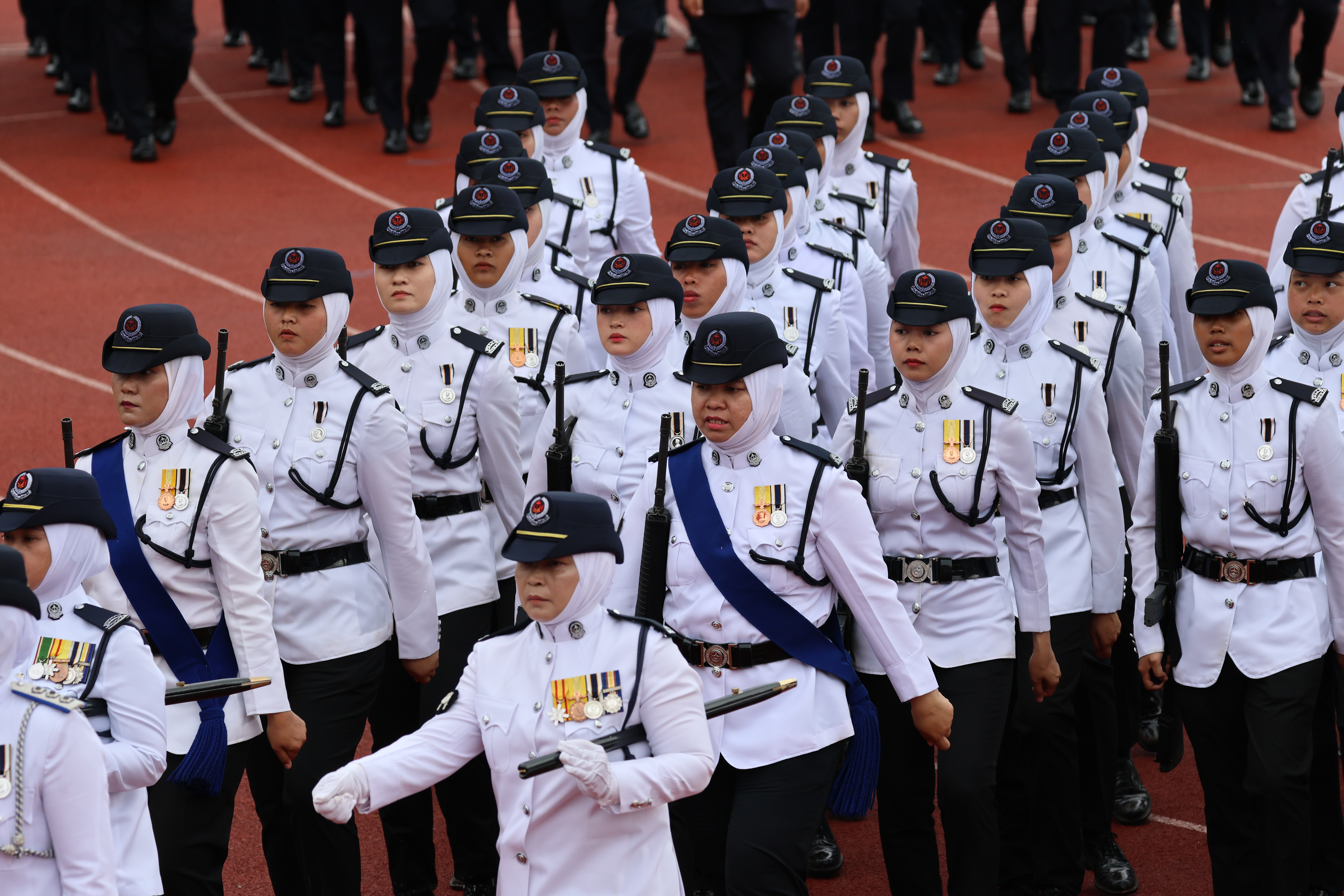
Women's Police Contingent

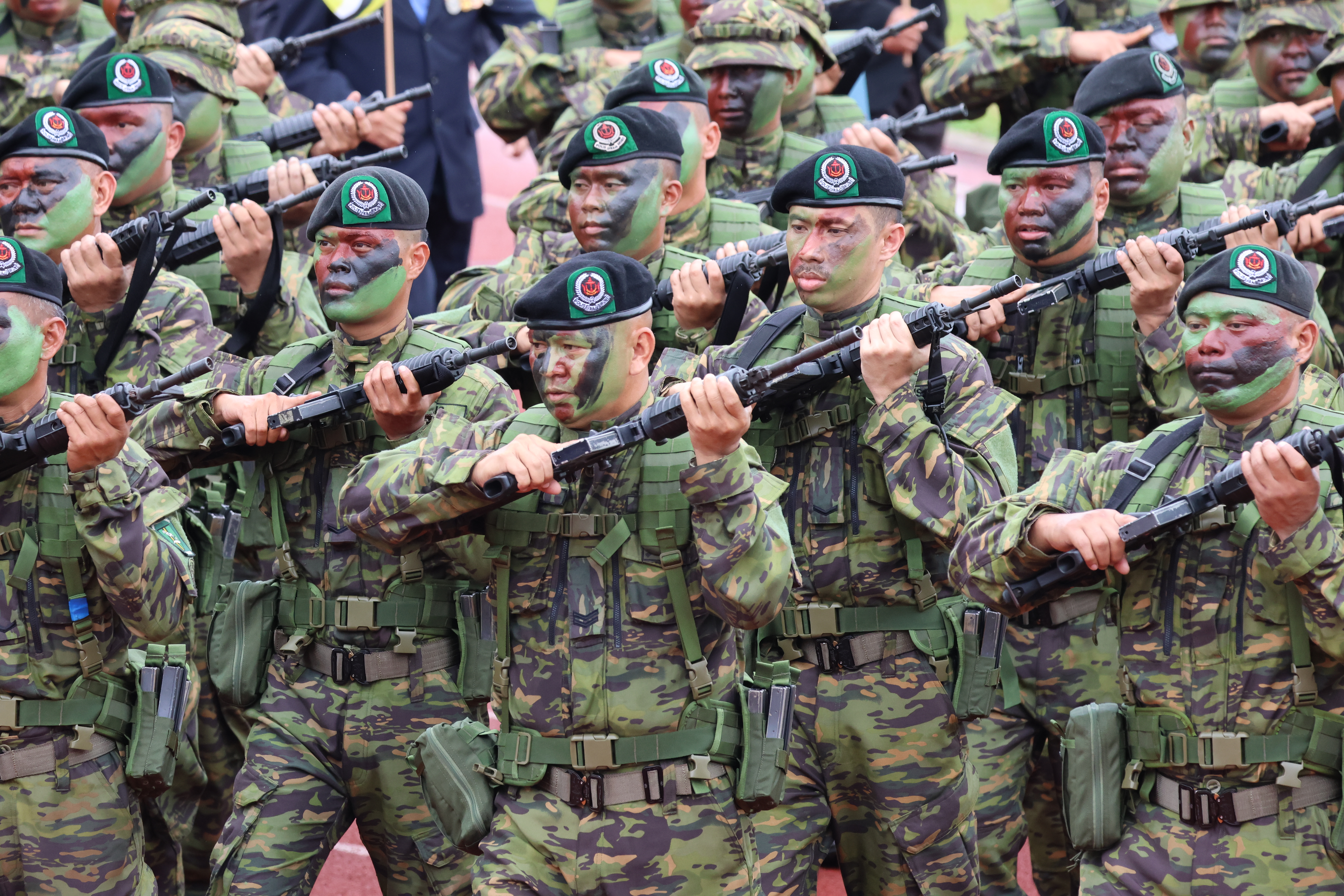
M4 armed policemen

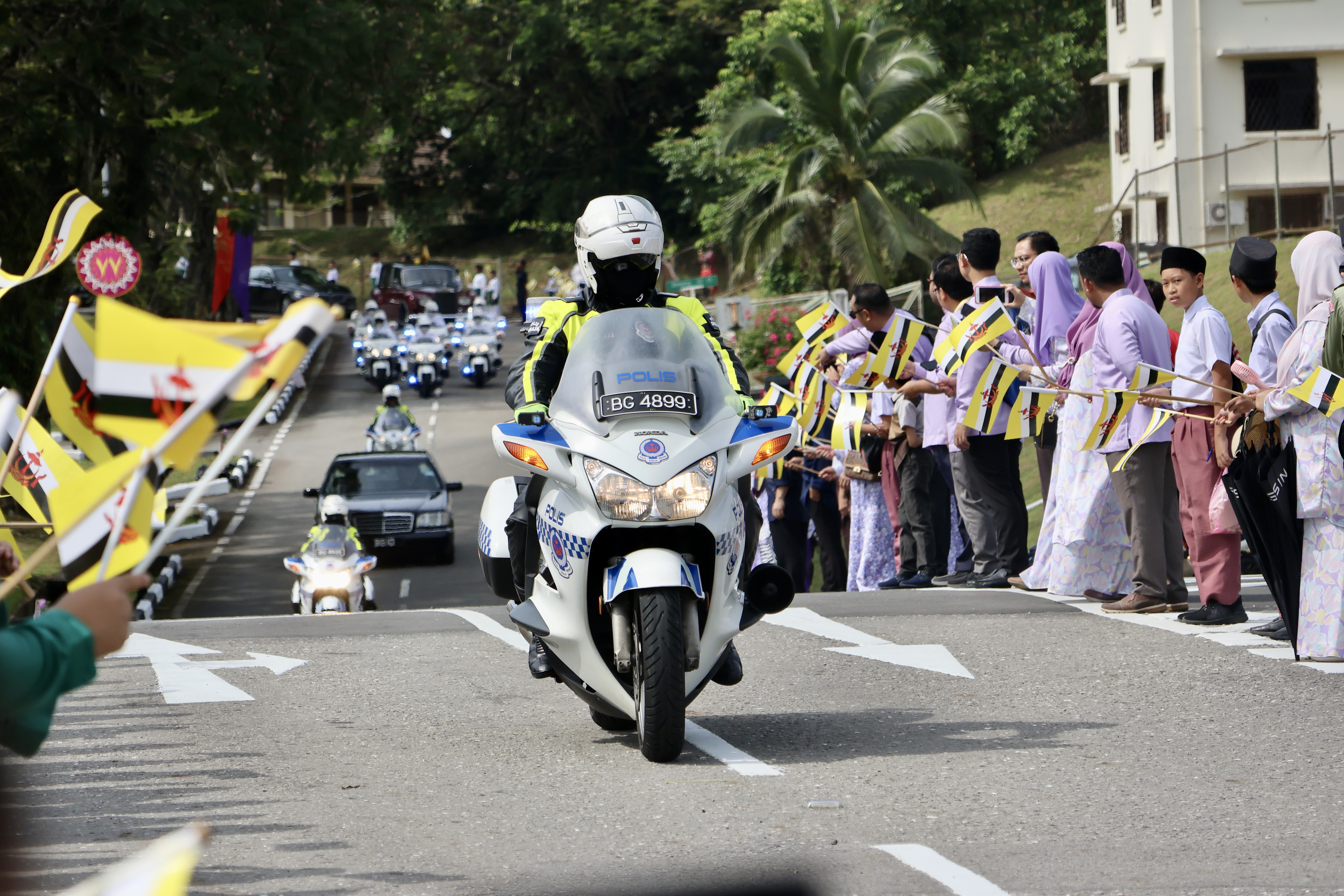
Honda ST1300 on escort duty

== Police Museum Gallery ==
On 4 February 2009, the RBPF officially opened the Police Museum Gallery in conjunction to its 88th anniversary.

== See also ==
- Special Operation Squad
- Royal Brunei Police Force Sports Council
