= List of libraries in Brunei =

This list of libraries in Brunei includes public, special and university libraries. All of the libraries are operated by departments and universities under the Government of Brunei.

Libraries in Brunei
Library	Operator	Type	Location		Website
Library	Operator	Type	Area/Branch	District	Website
Dewan Bahasa dan Pustaka Library	Dewan Bahasa dan Pustaka Brunei	Public	Bandar Seri Begawan	Brunei-Muara	URL
Dewan Bahasa dan Pustaka Library	Dewan Bahasa dan Pustaka Brunei	Public	Lambak Kanan	Brunei-Muara	URL
Dewan Bahasa dan Pustaka Library	Dewan Bahasa dan Pustaka Brunei	Public	Muara	Brunei-Muara	URL
Dewan Bahasa dan Pustaka Library	Dewan Bahasa dan Pustaka Brunei	Public	Sengkurong	Brunei-Muara	URL
Dewan Bahasa dan Pustaka Library	Dewan Bahasa dan Pustaka Brunei	Public	Tutong	Tutong	URL
Dewan Bahasa dan Pustaka Library	Dewan Bahasa dan Pustaka Brunei	Public	Kuala Belait	Belait	URL
Dewan Bahasa dan Pustaka Library	Dewan Bahasa dan Pustaka Brunei	Public	Pandan	Belait	URL
Dewan Bahasa dan Pustaka Library	Dewan Bahasa dan Pustaka Brunei	Public	Seria	Belait	URL
Dewan Bahasa dan Pustaka Library	Dewan Bahasa dan Pustaka Brunei	Public	Bangar	Temburong	URL
Attorney General's Chambers Library	Attorney General's Chambers	Special	Bandar Seri Begawan	Brunei-Muara	URL
Brunei History Centre Library	Brunei History Centre	Special	Bandar Seri Begawan	Brunei-Muara	URL
Islamic Da'wah Centre Library	Islamic Da'wah Centre	Special	Pulaie, Bandar Seri Begawan	Brunei-Muara	URL
Ministry of Religious Affairs Library	Ministry of Religious Affairs	Special	Bandar Seri Begawan	Brunei-Muara	URL
Museums Department Library	Museums Department	Special	Bandar Seri Begawan	Brunei-Muara	URL
University of Brunei Darussalam Library	University of Brunei Darussalam	University	Tungku	Brunei-Muara	URL
University of Technology Brunei Library	University of Technology Brunei	University	Tungku	Brunei-Muara	URL
Seri Begawan Religious Teachers University College Library	Seri Begawan Religious Teachers University College	University	Bandar Seri Begawan	Brunei-Muara	URL
Sultan Sharif Ali Islamic University Library	Sultan Sharif Ali Islamic University	University	Bandar Seri Begawan	Brunei-Muara	URL
