= Abdul Jalil Ahmad =

Bruneian naval officer

Yang Dimuliakan Pehin Datu Penglima Colonel (Retired) Dato Paduka Abdul Jalil Ahmad DPMB SNB PJK
- عبدالجليل احمد
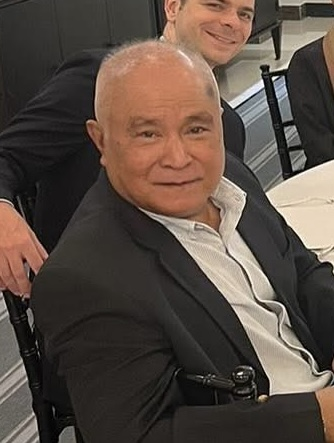
- Abdul Jalil in 2024

Ambassador of Brunei to Germany
- In office 26 February 2013 – 2015
- Preceded by: Yusof Abu Bakar
- Succeeded by: Rakiah Abdul Lamit

High Commissioner of Brunei to Pakistan
- In office 2006–2008

6th Commander of the Royal Brunei Navy
- In office 5 February 1995 – 13 June 2002
- Monarch: Hassanal Bolkiah
- Preceded by: Kefli Razali
- Succeeded by: Joharie Matussin

Personal details
- Born: Kampong Ayer, Brunei
- Education: Britannia Royal Naval College; Royal College of Defence Studies
- Profession: Naval officer; diplomat

Military service
- Allegiance: Brunei
- Branch/service: Royal Brunei Navy
- Years of service: 1973–2002
- Rank: Colonel
- Unit: HMS Intrepid (L11); KDB Pahlawan

Abdul Jalil bin Haji Ahmad is a Bruneian aristocrat, diplomat and retired naval officer who served as the sixth Commander of the Royal Brunei Navy (RBN) from 1995 to 2002. In addition, he later became the ambassador and high commissioner to several other countries.

== Early life and education ==
Abdul Jalil's early years were spent in Kampong Ayer, where he remained until he enlisted at the recruiting office of Bolkiah Camp of the Royal Brunei Malay Regiment (RBMR) in 1972. On 21 February 1972, when RBN was still known as 1st Boat Company RBMR (ALP AMDB), Abdul Jalil enlisted in the RBMR. He was promoted to the rank of first lieutenant on 13 December 1973. Both the Royal College of Defence Studies and the Britannia Royal Naval College at Dartmouth trained him to become an executive officer. He spent three months in the Mediterranean Sea serving on board the British warship HMS Intrepid (L11). This is in addition to making visits to cities like Gibraltar, Malta, Famagusta, Istanbul, Athens, and Naples.

== Military career ==
Upon completing his training, Abdul Jalil was assigned to the 30-person crew KDB Pahlawan as a gunnery and navigation officer. He organised a missile launch exercise utilising SS.11 and SS.12 at the time, using Pelong Rocks as the target. He took on his first command as KDB Masna's commander in 1975, a position he maintained for 23 years. After his time on KDB Masna, Abdul Jalil was given honorary command of KDB Seteria.

In Brunei's waters in the early 1970s, Abdul Jalil came across illegal immigrant ships, particularly from Vietnam. As a result, all ships in the fleet at the time were always on guard duty. During one of his patrols, the ship Abdul Jalil was aboard dragged a boat carrying illegal immigrants for security reasons. Unfortunately, the towing line had to be broken in order to prevent accidents due to the poor weather and sea situation.

The RBN Commander was Abdul Jalil from 5 February 1995 until 13 June 2002. Under his administration, he witnessed a great deal of progress, particularly in the areas of administration and maritime mobility.

== Diplomatic career ==
Pehin Abdul Jalil completed his term as the Islamic Republic of Pakistan's High Commissioner for Brunei. On 26 February 2013, the Sultan of Brunei presented him with a letter of credence confirming his appointment as Brunei's ambassador to the Federal Republic of Germany. On 24 August 2013, he was among the Bruneian representatives to at the launching ceremony of KDB Daruttaqwa (09), and also the ship's acceptance ceremony on 12 May 2014.

== Books ==
- Kolonel (B) Abdul Jalil Hj Ahmad, Pehin Datu Panglima (2008). Memoir Wira Samudera di Muara (in Malay). ISBN 9799991792322.

== Personal life ==
Haji Edy Jofren, his son, is a commander in the RBN.

== Honours ==
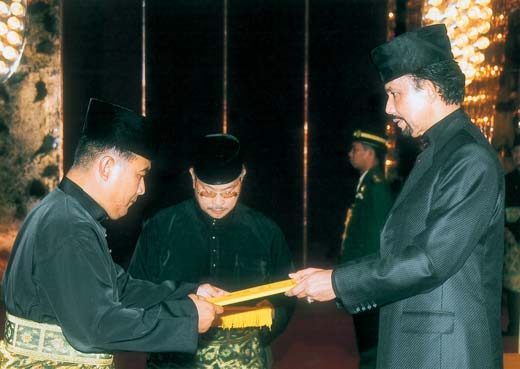
Pehin Abdul Jalil receiving his letters of credence from Sultan Hassanal Bolkiah in 2005

Abdul Jalil holds the Manteri title of Yang Dimuliakan Pehin Datu Penglima in 2003. Additionally, he has earned the following honours:

National

- Order of Seri Paduka Mahkota Brunei Second Class (DPMB) – Dato Paduka
- Order of Seri Paduka Mahkota Brunei Third Class (SMB)
- Order of Setia Negara Brunei Third Class (SNB)
- Meritorious Service Medal (PJK)
- Proclamation of Independence Medal (10 March 1997)
- General Service Medal
- Long Service Medal and Good Conduct (PKLPB)
- Royal Brunei Armed Forces Silver Jubilee Medal (31 May 1986)
- Sultan of Brunei Silver Jubilee Medal (5 October 1992)
- Sultan of Brunei Golden Jubilee Medal (5 October 2017)
- National Day Silver Jubilee Medal (23 February 2009)

Foreign

- Indonesia:
  - Navy Meritorious Service Star, 1st Class (BJSN, 17 August 1995)
- Singapore:
  - Pingat Jasa Gemilang (Tentera) (PJG; 11 December 1996)

Diplomatic posts
| Preceded by Yusof Abu Bakar | Ambassador of Brunei to Germany; 26 February 2013 – 2015 | Succeeded by Rakiah Abdul Lamit |
Military offices
| Preceded by Kefli Razali | 6th Commander of the Royal Brunei Navy; 5 February 1995 – 13 June 2002 | Succeeded by Joharie Matussin |
