= Dewan Bahasa dan Pustaka Library =

Public library in Bandar Seri Begawan, Brunei

- Perpustakaan Dewan Bahasa dan Pustaka
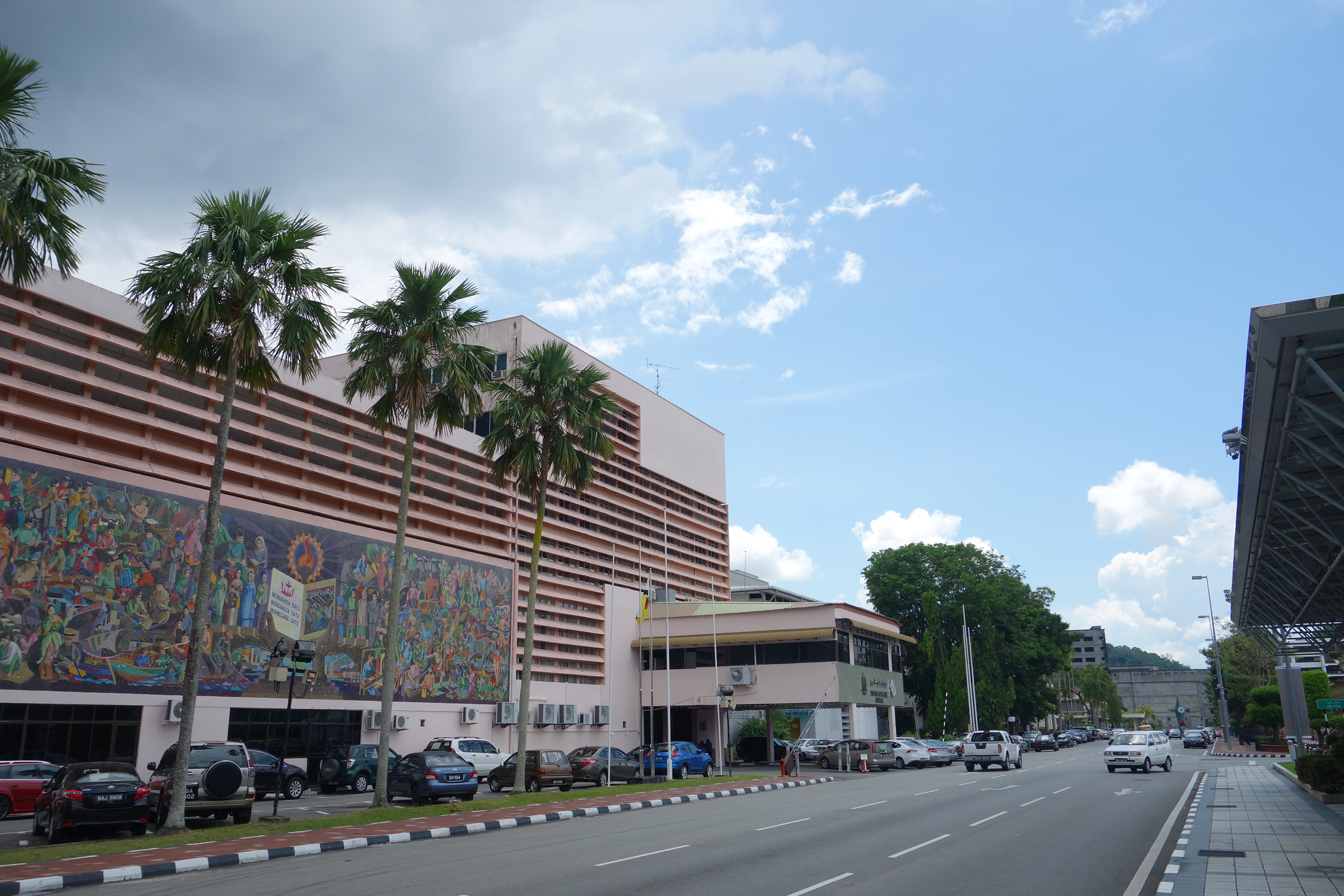
- The library in 2015
- 4.89057°N 114.94065°E
- Location: Jalan Elizabeth II, Bandar Seri Begawan, Brunei
- Type: Public library
- Established: 29 September 1968
- Architects: James Cubitt and Partners
- Branches: 8

Collection
- Size: 385,000

Other information
- Parent organisation: Language and Literature Bureau
- Website: www.dbplibrary.gov.bn

The Dewan Bahasa dan Pustaka Library (Malay: Perpustakaan Dewan Bahasa dan Pustaka), or simply Dewan Bahasa Pustaka Library, is a public library located in Pusat Bandar of Bandar Seri Begawan, Brunei. It was initiated in 1965 and completed in 1968. Designed in the Constructivist architecture, the building serves as a hub for educational and literary resources, with its primary function as a library and educational centre. Today, it offers a range of materials, services, and programs that are easily accessible and free of charge to all residents.

== History ==
The Dewan Bahasa dan Pustaka Library was established in 1963 and it was temporarily housed in the then Department of Education. Sultan Omar Ali Saifuddien III laid the building's foundation on 29 September 1965. It was formally inaugurated by Pengiran Anak Mohamed Alam on 29 September 1968. Government buildings were formerly located on the site, but they were razed to create place for the library. Constructed beside the Brunei Radio Broadcasting and Information Department, it is located in Brunei Town at the intersection of Jalan Elizabeth II and Jalan Stoney.

With time, it had a crucial part in key national events, such as preparations for Sultan Hassanal Bolkiah's coronation in 1968. From the time of the establishment, the library materials were only available for reference. However, from 1 September 1971, the library was made a public library and lending services are now offered to the public. Throughout the decades following the time of its establishment, a number of its branches were also created outside of the capital as well as in other districts. The first public library services in the all three other districts were established in 1975.

From 1992 to 1994, the administration section of the DPB gradually moved to the new building in the Old Airport area, and has since become the current headquarters location. Meanwhile, from 1994 the building at Jalan Elizabeth II has been made solely as a public library.

== Collections ==
The Dewan Bahasa dan Pustaka Library maintains a growing collection of about 385,000 volumes, classified into five primary sections: Reference Library, Adult Library, Young People's Library, Children's Library, and Mobile Library, each containing resources appropriate to its users. The Reference Section covers a variety of subjects pertaining to Brunei's history, culture, and more; it includes collections on Bruneiana, Southeast Asia/ASEAN, General, and Multimedia. The Young People's Library provides fiction, non-fiction, and instructional resources to readers between the ages of 13 and 21. The Adult section contains fiction and non-fiction in a variety of genres. In a laid-back atmosphere, the Children's section provides books, study spaces, and activities. In addition, the library has specific collections on library science and health, over 200 publications and journals, a gallery, an exhibition hall, a theater, and meeting spaces.

== Services ==
Perkhidmatan Perpustakaan Bergerak (Mobile Library Services) provides citizens who are unable to attend libraries because of distance, detention, school hours, or other reasons with access to Dewan Bahasa dan Pustaka Library items. The library staff uses bookmobiles to visit different places, such as schools, Al-Islah in Muara Town, Jerudong Prison, and Saba Darat Primary School in the Brunei–Muara District. Using five mobile library vans, the program serves the needs of children, the disabled, and housebound citizens. It also includes trips to Pulaie's institutions for the intellectually and physically impaired. The library also helps to establish Reading Corners in longhouses in the interior part of the country.

== Design and features ==
The Dewan Bahasa dan Pustaka Library building, designed by James Cubitt and Partners, is a prime example of the minimalist architecture popular in the 1950s and 1960s. Its façade is decorated with a colorful and detailed mosaic mural that was commissioned by Sultan Omar Ali Saifuddien III. Its elongated rectangular form and flat surfaces give it a modernist appearance. The main feature of the building's architecture is the mural, which was made by artist Pengiran Asmalee and then transformed into a Venetian-style mosaic by Tom Butcher. Its 30 by 6 metres (98 ft × 20 ft) mural represent the social, cultural, and economic life of Brunei. Originally, the structure had dark rooms, studios, a mezzanine library level, and a number of offices. The building's historical appeal has been preserved by the preservation of many original components, like columns, wooden banisters, and tiny ornamental tiles, despite minor modifications over the years that have updated the interior.

== Branches ==
The Dewan Bahasa dan Pustaka Library operates eight branches in the country, which include:

- Sengkurong Library
- Muara Library
- Lambak Kanan Library
- Tutong District Library
- Kuala Belait Library
- Kampong Pandan Library
- Seria Library
- Temburong District Library

== See also ==
- List of libraries in Brunei
