= Yusof Abu Bakar =

Bruneian military officer diplomat

Yang Dimuliakan Pehin Datu Inderasugara Brigadier General (Retired) Dato Paduka Yusof Abu Bakar DPMB SNB PJK
- يوسف ابو بكر
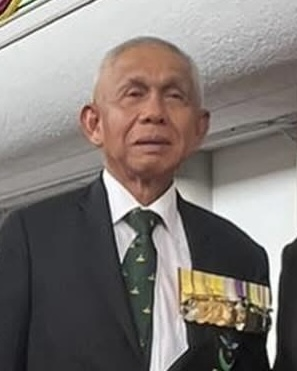
- Yusof in 2024

Ambassador of Brunei to Germany
- In office 7 April 2009 – 2013
- Preceded by: Ali Hassan
- Succeeded by: Abdul Jalil Ahmad

Ambassador of Brunei to Myanmar
- In office 2006–2009
- Preceded by: Pengiran Asmalee
- Succeeded by: Abdu'r Rahmani

Personal details
- Born: Brunei
- Occupation: Military officer; diplomat

Military service
- Allegiance: Brunei
- Branch/service: Royal Brunei Land Force
- Rank: Brigadier General

Mohammad Yusof bin Abu Bakar is a Bruneian aristocrat, military officer and diplomat who became the ambassador to Germany, and non-resident ambassador to Switzerland and Poland. Notably, he was the acting Commander of the Royal Brunei Armed Forces, and the Deputy President of National Football Association of Brunei Darussalam (NFABD).

== Diplomatic career ==
On 7 March 2006, as the newly appointed ambassador to Myanmar, Yusof was presented his letters of accreditations by Sultan Hassanal Bolkiah at the Istana Nurul Iman. Once again on 10 February 2009, as the newly appointed ambassador to Germany, he was presented his letters of accreditations. Later on the 23rd, Brunei joined the International Renewable Energy Agency (IRENA), following the signing of the statute by Yusof.

Yusof delivered his letter of credentials to President Bronislaw Komorowski on 20 January 2011, as the new non-resident ambassador to Poland. The presentation was held at the Presidential Palace, Warsaw.

== Honours ==
Yusof was bestowed the Manteri title of Yang Dimuliakan Pehin Datu Inderasugara. He has earned the following honours;

- Order of Seri Paduka Mahkota Brunei Second Class (DPMB) – Dato Paduka
- Order of Seri Paduka Mahkota Brunei Third Class (SMB)
- Order of Setia Negara Brunei Third Class (SNB)
- Meritorious Service Medal (PJK)

Diplomatic posts
Preceded by Ali Hassan	Ambassador of Brunei to Germany; 7 April 2009 – 2013	Succeeded by Abdul Jalil Ahmad
Preceded by Pengiran Asmalee	Ambassador of Brunei to Myanmar; 2006–2009	Succeeded by Abdu'r Rahmani
