= List of ambassadors of Brunei to China =

Coordinates: 39.958034°N 116.486971°E

Ambassador of Brunei to the People's Republic of China
- 文萊駐中華人民共和國大使
- Emblem of Brunei

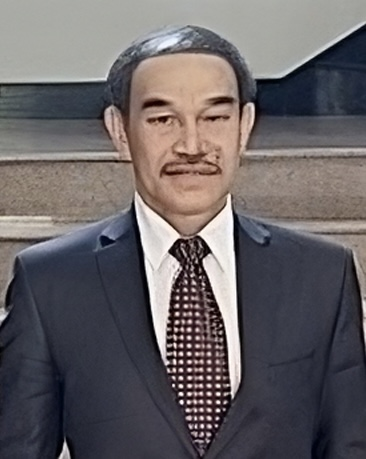
- Incumbent; Abdu'r Rahmani since 22 November 2019
- Style: His Excellency
- Residence: Beijing
- Appointer: Sultan of Brunei
- Term length: At His Majesty's pleasure
- Inaugural holder: Pengiran Abdul Momin (non-resident); Abdullah Mohd Jaafar (resident)
- Formation: 30 September 1991
- Website: Official website

The Bruneian ambassador in Beijing is the official representative of the Government in Bandar Seri Begawan to the Government of the People's Republic of China.

== Chronology ==
Representation is as follows (years refer to dates of actual service):

- Governments in Beijing and Bandar Seri Begawan established diplomatic relations: 1991
- Ambassador Extraordinary and Plenipotentiary to the People's Republic of China: since 1991

== List of ambassadors ==
Diplomatic agrément/Diplomatic accreditation	Ambassador	Observations	Prime Minister of Brunei	Premier of the People's Republic of China	Term end
24 October 1992	Pengiran Dipa Negara Laila Raja Pengiran Haji Abdul Momin bin Pengiran Haji ismail	First non-resident ambassador of Brunei to China, based in Kuala Lumpur, Malaysia. In 1993, embassies were established in both capitals, and resident ambassadors were exchanged. Letters of credentials presented to Yang Shangkun. In June 1993, Prince Mohamed Bolkiah paid an official visit to China.	Hassanal Bolkiah	Li Peng	1994
25 April 1994	Dato Paduka Haji Abdullah bin Haji Mohd Jaafar	First ambassador of Brunei to China. Princess Masna meets with Tang Jiaxuan in June 1994. In September, Pehin Dato Hussain led a delegation to China to exchange views on the promotion of culture, youth, and sports. From 28 July to 2 August 1995, Qian Qichen and Prince Mohamed Bolkiah met during the 28th ASEAN Foreign Ministers' Meeting and the 2nd ASEAN Regional Forum in Brunei.	Hassanal Bolkiah	Li Peng	1997
21 October 1997	Pehin Orang Kaya Leila Perkasa Colonel (Retired) Dato Paduka Haji Mahdini bin Dato Paduka Haji Basir	Zhu Rongji welcomed the Sultan during his working visit to China from 23 to 26 August 1999.	Hassanal Bolkiah	Li Peng	2000
20 March 2001	Pengiran Dato Paduka Haji Asmalee bin Pengiran Ahmad	The Sultan visited China twice in 2001, once for the APEC high-level discussion on human capacity building and once for the APEC business leaders' informal meeting. He again paid a second working visit to China in September 2004. In March 2002, Prince Al-Muhtadee Billah paid his first visit to the People's Republic of China. Prince Mohamed Bolkiah visited China in May 2001 to attend the 4th Asia-Europe Foreign Ministers' Conference.	Hassanal Bolkiah	Zhu Rongji	2002
22 December 2002	Haji Abdul Hamid bin Haji Jalil	On 30 October 2006, the Sultan attended the Commemorative Summit which marks the 15th Anniversary of Asean-China Dialogue Relations.	Hassanal Bolkiah	Zhu Rongji	2007
3 April 2008	Datin Paduka Magdalene Teo Chee Siong	First Chinese ambassador. On 8 April 2013, the Sultan and Prince Azim visited Hainan Province, after finishing their state visit to China and attended the Boao Forum for Asia International Conference Centre.	Hassanal Bolkiah	Wen Jiabao	2013
22 November 2019	Pehin Orang Kaya Seri Pahlawan Colonel (retired) Dato Paduka Haji Abdu'r Rahmani bin Dato Paduka Haji Basir	During the 3rd Brunei-Guangxi Economic Corridor Joint Cooperation Committee (BGEC JCC) meeting, Amin Liew Abdullah signed the "Upgraded Guangxi-Brunei Economic Corridor Cooperation Memorandum of Understanding" and many industrial project cooperation agreements.	Hassanal Bolkiah	Li Keqiang	incumbent

== See also ==
- Brunei–China relations
