= Brunei–France relations =

- Brunei: France

Envoy
- Ambassador Rakiah Abdul Lamit: Ambassador Bernard Régnauld-Fabre

Brunei and France have had diplomatic relations since 1984. Brunei has an embassy in Paris, and France has an embassy in Bandar Seri Begawan.

== History ==
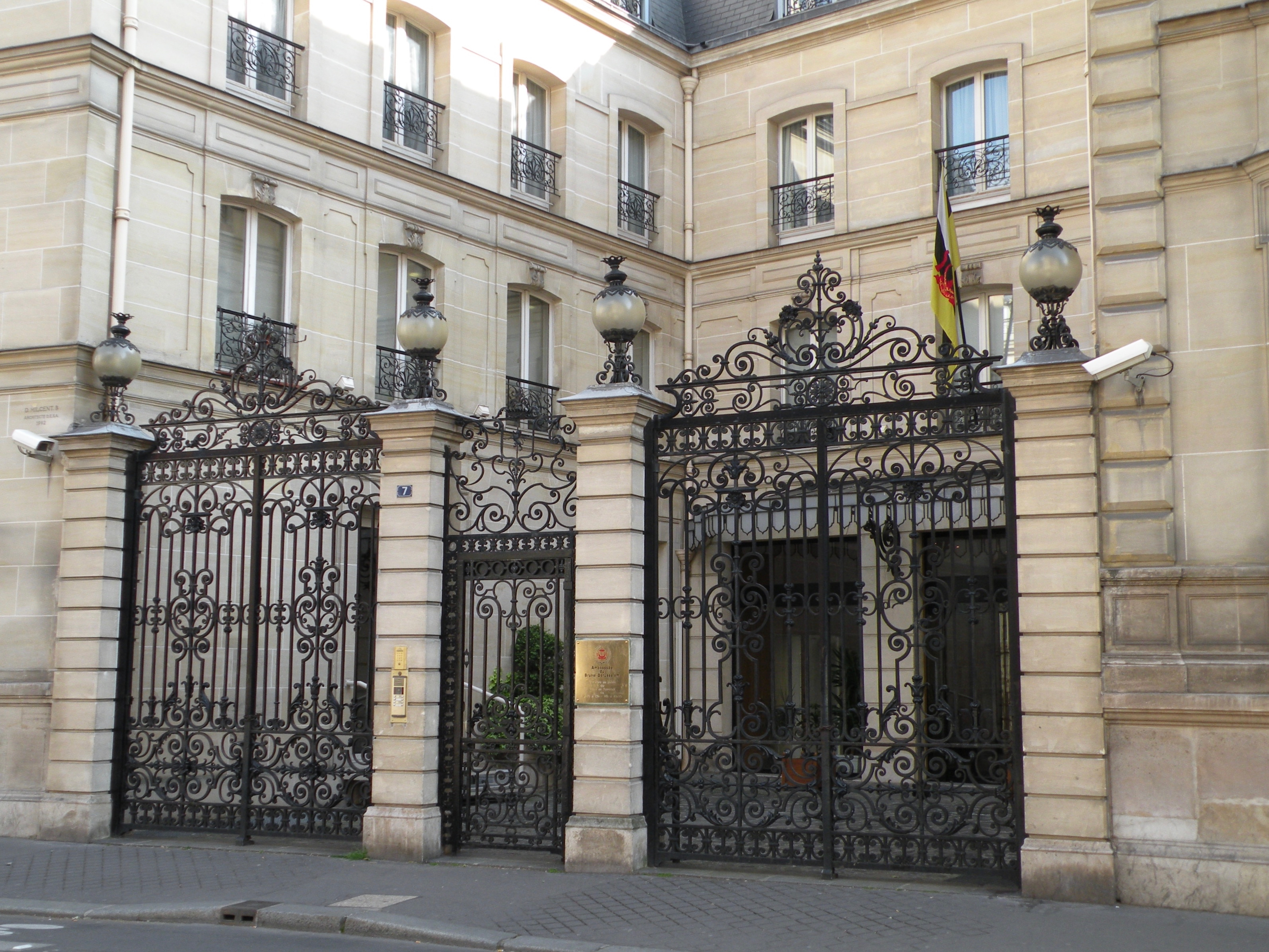
Embassy of Brunei in Paris

Relations between the two countries have been established since 8 May 1984. In 1996, Hassanal Bolkiah made a first state visit to France to promoted exchanges visits between officials of the two countries.

== Economic relations ==
In 2011, trade between the two countries reached €10 million. Both companies from Brunei and France also explore opportunities in oil and gas industry, and French companies seeks to explore a possible joint ventures with Bruneian partners. In aviation, the Royal Brunei Airlines (RBA) has signed a 12-year engineering partnership agreement with Air France–KLM.

== Security relations ==
There is also a defence co-operation between Brunei and France since the signing of a memorandum of understanding in 1999.
