= Pengiran Asmalee =

Bruneian diplomat and artist (born 1941)

Dato Paduka Pengiran Asmalee DPMB SLJ
- ڤڠيرن اسمالي
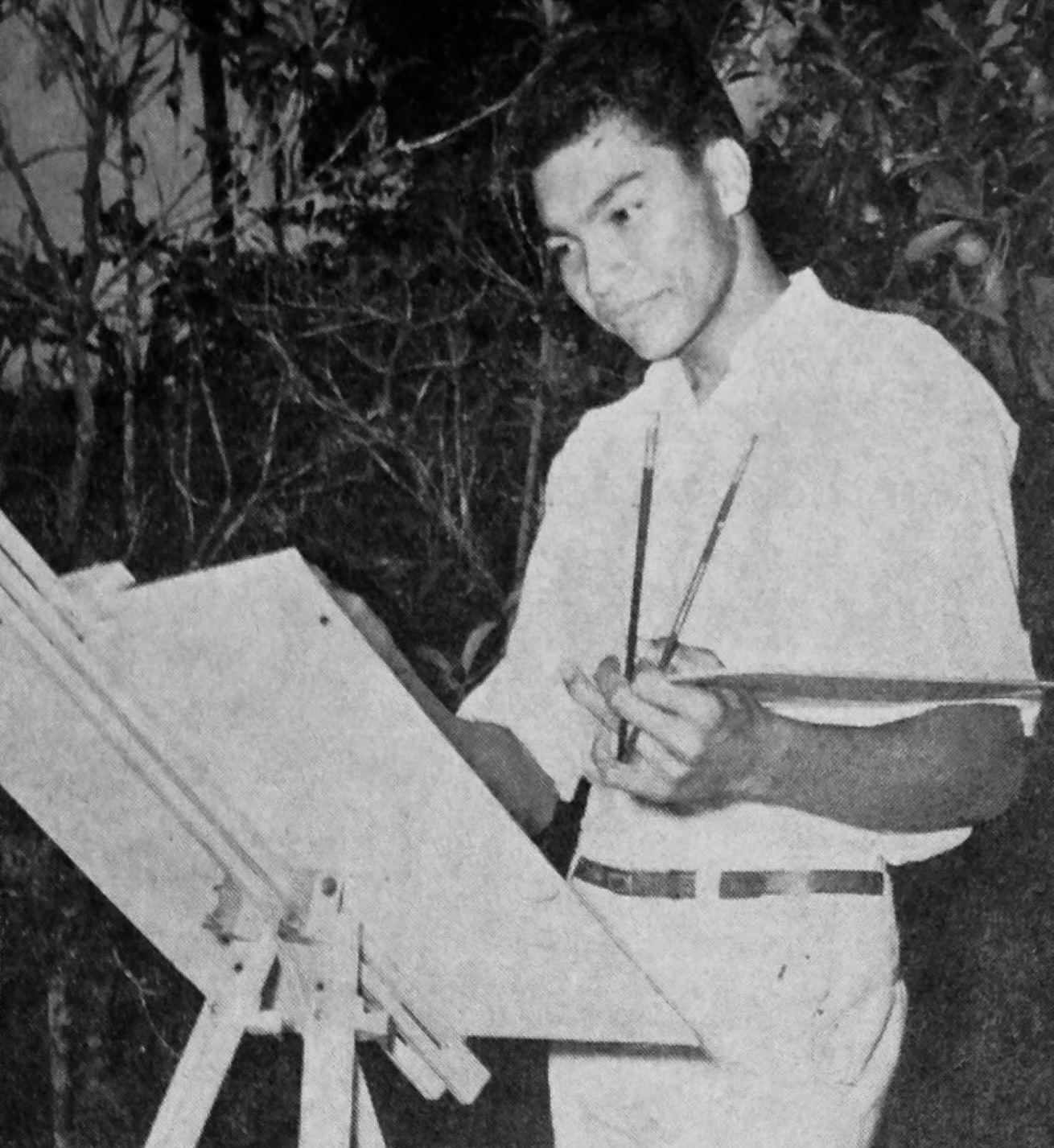
- Awangku Asmalee in 1959

Ambassador of Brunei to China
- In office 20 March 2001 – 2002
- Preceded by: Mahdini Basir
- Succeeded by: Abdul Hamid Jalil

Ambassador of Brunei to Myanmar
- In office 20 May 1997 – 2001
- Preceded by: Hussin Sulaiman
- Succeeded by: Yusof Abu Bakar

Personal details
- Born: Awangku Asmalee bin Pengiran Ahmad; 18 May 1941 (age 85) Brunei
- Education: Sultan Omar Ali Saifuddien College; Hornsey College of Art
- Occupation: Diplomat; artist

Pengiran Asmalee bin Pengiran Ahmad (born 18 May 1941) is a Bruneian artist and retired diplomat who formerly held the position of ambassador of Brunei to China from 2001 to 2002, and Myanmar from 1997 to 2001.

== Education ==
After completing his early schooling at the Sultan Muhammad Jamalul Alam Malay School, he continued his studies at Brunei Town's Sultan Omar Ali Saifuddien College. Mrs. Fisenden, a college instructor, was aware of Awangku Asmalee's propensity for drawing and offered him some advice to help him get better at it. Following that, M. Bastians, a different painting instructor, tutored him.

Prince Philip, Duke of Edinburgh, wrote 18-year-old Awangku Asmalee to congratulate him on the two paintings he had sent the Duke. At the time, the young painter was a Form IV student at the college. The Duke wrote to him expressing his pride at receiving the paintings, which will serve as a reminder of his trip to Brunei. The paintings, which were given to the Duke at Istana Darul Hana on 28 February 1959, during his visit to Brunei, show Kampong Ayer from the Residency hill and the construction of the Sultan Omar Ali Saifuddin Mosque.

One of the oldest outdoor artworks in the nation is a 30 metres (98 ft) wide mosaic mural located on the front of the Language and Literature Bureau. The artwork was finished in 1965 and commissioned by Sultan Omar Ali Saifuddien III, was fashioned using mosaic tiles that were manufactured in accordance with a painting that was created in 1963 by him. In 1963, Awangku Asmalee left Brunei to attend an art painting course at Hornsey College of Art in London.

== Diplomatic career ==
Pengiran Asmalee worked for the Department of Welfare, Youth, and Sports, the Department of Radio and Television Brunei, and the Department of Language and Literature Bureau from 1962 until 1996. On 13 May 1996, he announced his retirement as the Department of Welfare, Youth, and Sports' director. On 20 May 1997, the Government of Myanmar approved his appointment to succeed Hussin Sulaiman as ambassador, with a residence in Yangon. From 29 to 31 May 1998, Pengiran Asmalee, the ambassador of Myanmar, accompanied Sultan Hassanal Bolkiah on his tour to Myanmar.

Pengiran Asmalee was appointed as the ambassador to China on 20 May 1997. He was involved in several state visits especially during the Sultan's two trips to China in 2001: one for the informal gathering of APEC business leaders and the other for the high-level debate on human capacity building. In September 2004, he made a second working visit to China. Prince Al-Muhtadee Billah also visited China for the first time in March 2002 and in May 2001, Prince Mohamed Bolkiah traveled to China for the 4th Asia-Europe Foreign Ministers' Conference.

== Artistry ==
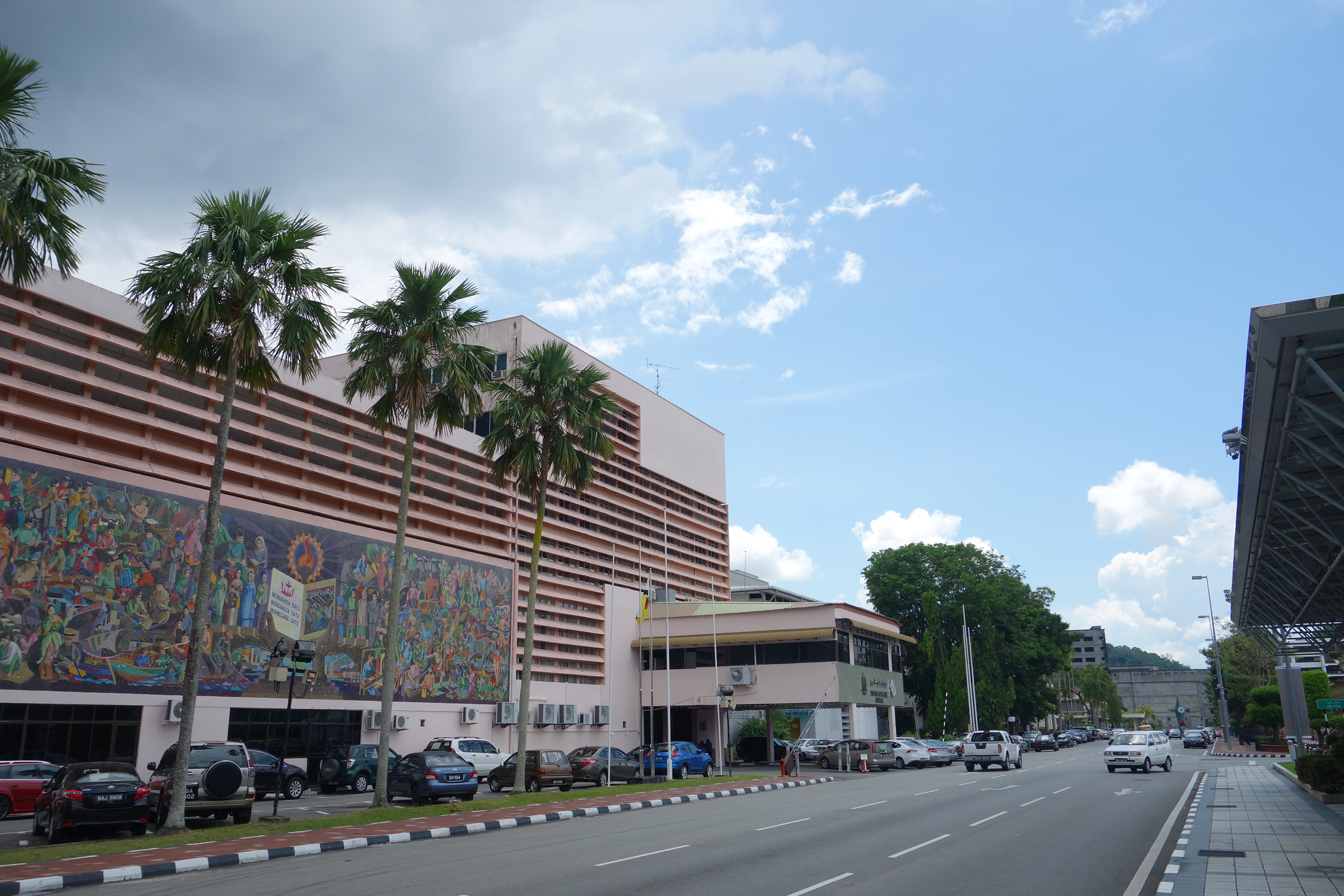
Mosaic mural (left) at the Language and Literature Bureau in 2015

Pengiran Asmalee created a style known as "Zikirism," which is akin to Pointillism and involves painting with pure colour dots while firmly remembering Allah as he is influenced by his Islamic beliefs. In actuality, Islamic ideology is the basis for a number of his works. Even though he didn't start painting full-time until after he retired, he was nevertheless able to complete a sizable number of works while employed by the Bruneian government.

== Personal life ==
Awangku Asmalee bin Pengiran Ahmad was born on 18 May 1941. He has three kids and is married.

== Honours ==
He is known to have been awarded the following honours:

- Order of Seri Paduka Mahkota Brunei Second Class (DPMB) – Dato Paduka
- Order of Paduka Seri Laila Jasa Third Class (SLJ)
- Sultan Hassanal Bolkiah Medal (PHBS)

Diplomatic posts
Preceded by Mahdini Basir	Ambassador of Brunei to China; 20 March 2001 – 2002	Succeeded by Abdul Hamid Jalil
Preceded by Hussin Sulaiman	Ambassador of Brunei to Myanmar; 20 May 1997 – 2001	Succeeded by Yusof Abu Bakar
