= Rakiah Abdul Lamit =

Bruneian diplomat

Her Excellency Datin Paduka Rakiah Abdul Lamit DPMB
- رقيه عبداللميت
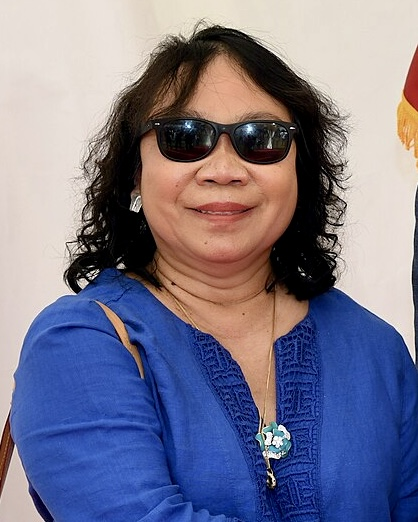
- Ambassador Rakiah in 2018

Ambassador of Brunei to France
- Incumbent
- Assumed office 13 January 2023
- Preceded by: Malai Halimah Yusoff

Ambassador of Brunei to Germany
- In office 19 May 2015 – 2020
- Preceded by: Abdul Jalil Ahmad
- Succeeded by: Pengiran Krtini

High Commissioner of Brunei to Canada
- In office 18 June 2008 – 2012
- Preceded by: Magdalene Teo
- Succeeded by: Kamal Bashah

Personal details
- Born: 18 May 1960 (age 66) Brunei
- Education: University of Kent (BA)
- Occupation: Diplomat

Rakiah binti Haji Abdul Lamit @ Hamid (born 18 May 1960) is a Bruneian diplomat who became the resident and non-resident ambassador to France and Monaco respectively since 2023, ambassador to Germany from 2015 to 2022, and high commissioner to Canada from 2008 to 2012.

== Education ==
Rakiah obtained her B.A. (Hon) South East Asia Studies/Anthropology from the University of Kent at Canterbury from 1982 to 1985.

== Diplomatic career ==
Rakiah began her career as a research officer at the Ministry of Foreign Affairs and Trade (MOFAT) from 1985 to 1991; second secretary at the Brunei High Commission in London from 1990 to 1993; assistant director of consular, MOFAT from 1991 to 2001; first secretary at the Brunei High Commission in Kuala Lumpur, Malaysia from 1994 to 1999; deputy director of consular, MOFAT from 2001 to 2004; Minister Counsellor at the Embassy of Brunei Darussalam in Beijing, People's Republic of China from 2002 to 2005; deputy director of ASEAN, MOFAT from 2005 to 2006; deputy director of protocol and consular affairs, MOFAT.

Rakiah's overseas appointments began as the high commissioner, Brunei High Commission in Ottawa, Canada, from 2008 to 2012. At the same time, she was named Brunei's non-resident ambassador to Brazil and Argentina. On 15 April 2008, Sultan Hassanal Bolkiah gave his permission to provide Brunei's high commissioner to Canada, her letters of credential, in which would officially be handed over to Michaëlle Jean on 18 June 2008.

From August 2012 to October 2013, Rakiah was appointed as the secretary to the ASEAN Summit 2013 Logistics Committee. She later returned as the director of protocol and consular affairs, MOFAT from November 2013 to April 2015. She handed over her accredation to Federal Government of Germany on 19 May 2015. While based in Germany, she has been appointed as the non-resident ambassador to Switzerland in November, Poland in December 2015, and Austria in February 2016.

At Istana Nurul Iman on 20 October 2022, the Sultan of Brunei gave letters of credence to Rakiah, the new ambassador of Brunei Darussalam to France. The credentials would officially be handed over to France on 13 January 2023. On Tuesday, 30 May, Datin Rakiah visited the UNESCO, Audrey Azoulay. She was given letters attesting to her appointment as Ambassador and Permanent Delegate of Brunei Darussalam to the UNESCO. As the new ambassador of Brunei to Monaco on 6 November, she presented her letters of credential to Prince Albert II.

== Personal life ==
Rakiah is a single mother to an adopted daughter. Her hobbies included travelling, listening to music, watching movies and reading.

== Honours ==
- Order of Seri Paduka Mahkota Brunei Second Class (DPMB; 15 July 2017) – Datin Paduka

Diplomatic posts
Preceded by Malai Halimah Yusoff	Ambassador of Brunei to France; 13 January 2023 – present	Incumbent
Preceded by Abdul Jalil Ahmad	Ambassador of Brunei to Germany; 19 May 2015 – 2020	Succeeded by Pengiran Krtini
Preceded by Magdalene Teo	High Commissioner of Brunei to Canada; 18 June 2008 – 2012	Succeeded by Kamal Bashah
