= Magdalene Teo =

Bruneian diplomat (died 2021)

Datin Paduka Magdalene Teo DPMB
- 张慈祥
- Teo in 2015

Ambassador of Brunei to China
- In office 3 April 2008 – 2018
- Preceded by: Abdul Hamid Jalil
- Succeeded by: Abdu'r Rahmani

High Commissioner of Brunei to Canada
- In office 15 March 2005 – 2007
- Preceded by: Jocklin Kongpaw
- Succeeded by: Rakiah Abdul Lamit

Personal details
- Born: Teo Chee Siong; October 1956 Kuala Belait, Brunei
- Died: July 2021 (aged 64) Bandar Seri Begawan, Brunei
- Resting place: Berakas Catholic Cemetery
- Parent(s): Zhang Guilin (father); Zhuang Jinzhu (mother)
- Occupation: Diplomat

Chinese name
- Simplified Chinese: 张慈祥
- Traditional Chinese: 張慈祥
Transcriptions
Standard Mandarin
- Hanyu Pinyin: Zhāng Cíxiáng
Southern Min
- Hokkien POJ: Tioⁿ Chîr-siông

Datin Paduka Magdalene Teo Chee Siong (Chinese: 张慈祥; pinyin: Zhāng Cíxiáng; Pe̍h-ōe-jī: Tioⁿ Chîr-siông; died 31 July 2021) was a Brunei diplomat of Chinese and Brunei Dusun descent who became the ambassador to China from 2007 to 2018, and high commissioner to Canada from 2005 to 2007.

== Education ==
She attended Chung Hua Middle School, Kuala Belait before switching to Perdana Wazir Secondary School, Kuala Belait and later on the Sixth Form College. After receiving a government grant to study law in the United Kingdom and graduating in 1983, she worked for the Bruneian government in the Ministry of Foreign Affairs upon her return.

== Diplomatic career ==
=== Canada ===
On 15 March 2005, she was appointed the Brunei high commissioner to Canada, at the Istana Nurul Iman.

==== Canadian Senate expenses scandal ====
She was inadvertently drawn into the Senate expenses scandal after purchasing a property owned by Senator Mac Harb. All charges against the Senators were subsequently dropped in 2016.

=== China ===
Datin Magdalene was appointed as Ambassador to China in 2007 and officially presented her credentials to President Hu Jintao in April 2008 and it was this appointment that defined her diplomatic legacy. Over the next decade, as Ambassador Extraordinary and Plenipotentiary, she became a central figure in shaping the modern Brunei–China relationship at a time of rapid geopolitical change.

During her tenure in China, Ambassador Teo participated extensively in diplomatic activities and cultural engagement. She attended cultural events, academic forums, provincial visits, and ASEAN-China activities. Chinese officials and academics described her diplomatic approach as characterized by consistent relationship-building and personal engagement.

Ambassador Teo was equally committed to education and cultural exchange, believing that the future of bilateral relations lay not only in government agreements but in the ties forged between students, artists, and ordinary people. In Guizhou in 2013, at an exhibition showcasing Bruneian photography, she spoke of culture as a “unique bridge of understanding,” capable of making peoples “closer and more friendly.” She also encouraged Chinese universities—particularly those outside the major coastal hubs—to develop lasting academic partnerships with Bruneian institutions.

A key highlight was a 2016 ceremony marking the 25th anniversary of Brunei Darussalam–China relations. Highlighting and celebrated the more than 40 mechanisms of cooperation that had grown between the two countries.

Behind the scenes, she supported Brunei’s economic engagement with China, including cooperation on industrial development, tourism, and connectivity. Her calm, culturally attuned diplomacy laid the soft-power foundation for large-scale collaboration that would later deepen under the Belt and Road Initiative.

In recognition of her contributions, she was awarded the Darjah Paduka Mahkota Brunei, Second Class (DPMB) in 2012, receiving the title Datin Paduka.

She returned to Brunei after completing her term in China in 2018.

== Death ==
After a battle with illness on 31 July 2021, Magdalene died at the age of 64. Her funeral was held on 3 August at the Church of Our Lady of Assumption, and laid to rest at Berakas Catholic Cemetery.

Her death prompted tributes from across the region, including from Chinese cultural and diplomatic institutions whose representatives described her as a “bridge of friendship” between nations.

== Honours ==
Throughout her career, she has received the following honours;

- Order of Seri Paduka Mahkota Brunei Second Class (DPMB; 15 July 2012) – Datin Paduka

Diplomatic posts
Preceded by Abdul Hamid Jalil	Ambassador of Brunei to China; 3 April 2008 – 2018	Succeeded by Abdu'r Rahmani
Preceded by Jocklin Kongpaw	High Commissioner of Brunei to Canada; 15 March 2005 – 2007	Succeeded by Rakiah Abdul Lamit
