= Kamus Bahasa Melayu Brunei =

Dictionary of Brunei Malay

- Language: Malay
- Genre: dictionary
- Publisher: Dewan Bahasa dan Pustaka Brunei
- Publication place: Brunei
- ISBN: 9-991-70543-0

Kamus Bahasa Melayu Brunei is a dictionary of Brunei Malay, the native lingua franca in Brunei. It is published by Dewan Bahasa dan Pustaka Brunei. The current publication is in its second edition, and contains more than 15,000 word entries.

== Editions ==
The first edition of Kamus Bahasa Melayu Brunei was published in 1991 and contains more than 3,000 entries. In 2007, the current second edition was published, in which there is an increase of its vocabularies up to more than 15,000.
