= List of ambassadors of Brunei to France =

Coordinates: 48.8721930°N 2.2944835°E

Ambassador of Brunei to France
- Ambassade du Brunei en France
- Emblem of Brunei

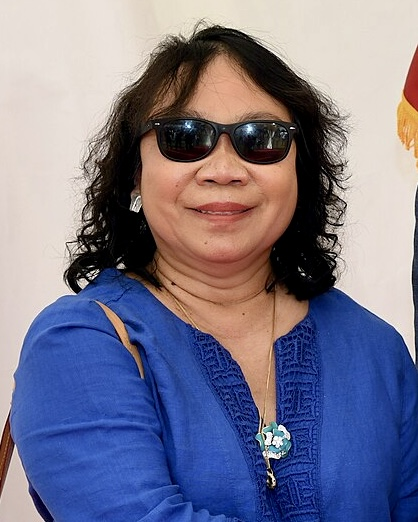
- Incumbent; Rakiah Abdul Lamit since 13 January 2023
- Style: Her Excellency
- Residence: Paris
- Appointer: Sultan of Brunei
- Term length: At His Majesty's pleasure
- Inaugural holder: Mustapha Metasan (non-resident); Suyoi Osman (resident)
- Formation: 16 November 1990
- Website: Official website

The Bruneian ambassador in Paris is the official representative of the Government in Bandar Seri Begawan to the Government of France.

== Chronology ==
Representation is as follows (years refer to dates of actual service):

- Governments in Paris and Bandar Seri Begawan established diplomatic relations: 1984
- Ambassador Extraordinary and Plenipotentiary to France: since 1990

== List of ambassadors ==
Diplomatic accreditation	Ambassador	Observations	Prime Minister of Brunei	President of France	Term end
16 November 1990	Pengiran Dato Paduka Haji Mustapha bin Pengiran Metasan	First non-resident ambassador of Brunei to France, based in the United Kingdom.	Hassanal Bolkiah	François Mitterrand	1991
7 October 1991	Pehin Orang Kaya Indera Pahlawan Dato Seri Setia Haji Suyoi bin Haji Osman		Hassanal Bolkiah	François Mitterrand	10 July 1996
10 July 1996	Pengiran Dato Paduka Haji Idris bin Duli Pengiran Temenggong Pengiran Haji Mohammad	Both governments have exchanged visits on several occasions. In 1996, the Sultan paid a state visit to France. Brunei and France have also had defense cooperation since the signing of a memorandum of understanding in 1999.	Hassanal Bolkiah	Jacques Chirac	2000
24 January 2000	Pengiran Datin Paduka Hajah Masrainah binti Pengiran Haji Ahmad		Hassanal Bolkiah	Jacques Chirac	2004
10 February 2004	Dato Paduka Haji Zainidi bin Haji Sidup	Prince Al-Muhtadee Billah and Princess Sarah paid an official visit to France on 5 June 2006. Prince Abdul Malik and Prince Abdul Qawi were also present.	Hassanal Bolkiah	Jacques Chirac	2016
9 November 2016	Datin Paduka Malai Hajah Halimah binti Malai Haji Yussof	France is interested in deepening bilateral connections with Brunei in tourism, technology, and oil and gas. This was discovered by a group of four French senators who visited Brunei for the first time in January 2017.	Hassanal Bolkiah	François Hollande	2023
13 January 2023	Datin Paduka Hajah Rakiah binti Haji Abdul Lamit	The Sultan paid an official visit to French from 13 to 14 October 2023. The Sultan welcomed Rear Admiral Geoffroy d'Andigné, at an audience in Istana Nurul Iman on 26 September 2023.	Hassanal Bolkiah	Emmanuel Macron	incumbent

== Gallery ==
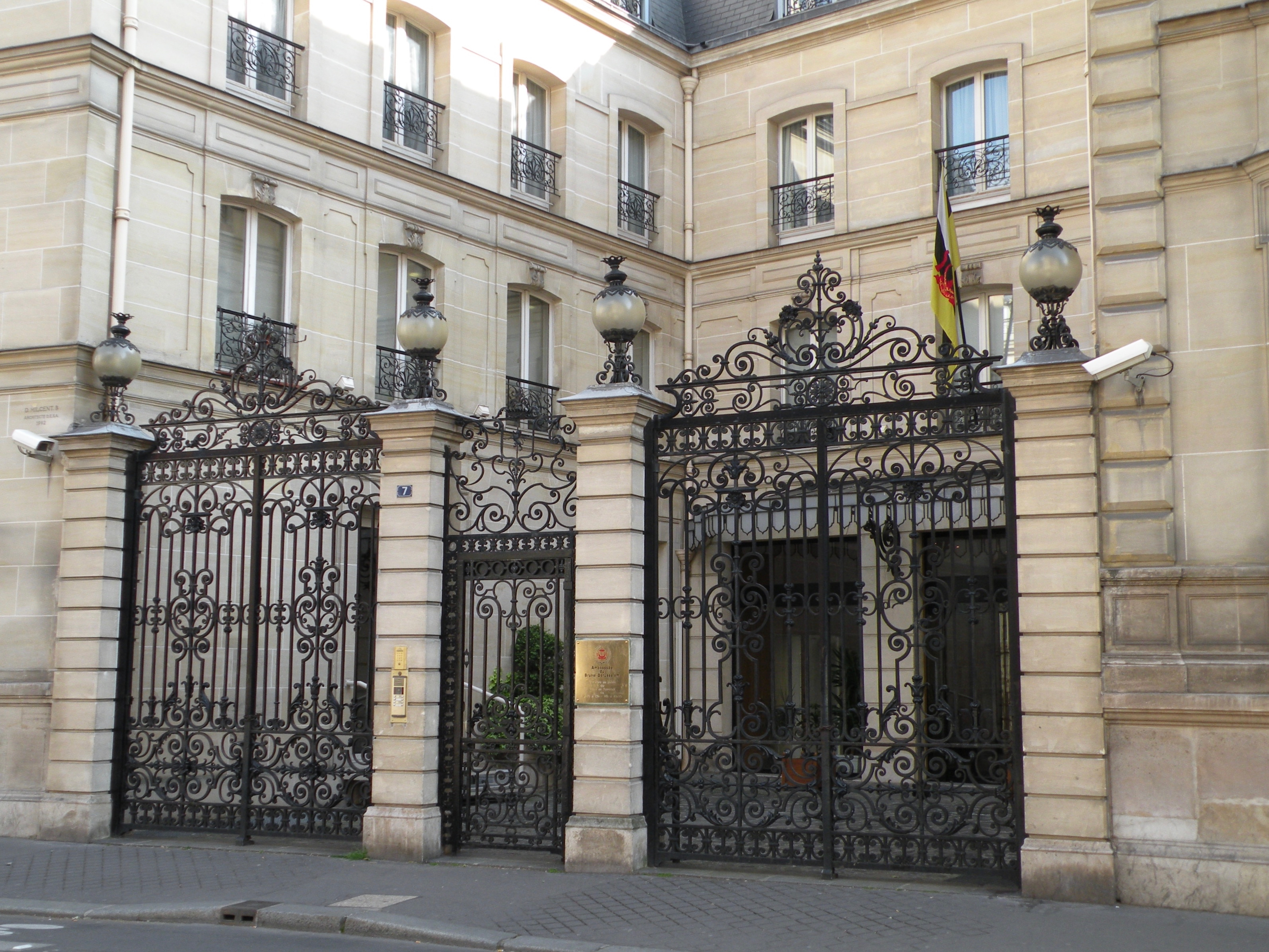
The Brunei Embassy's main gate

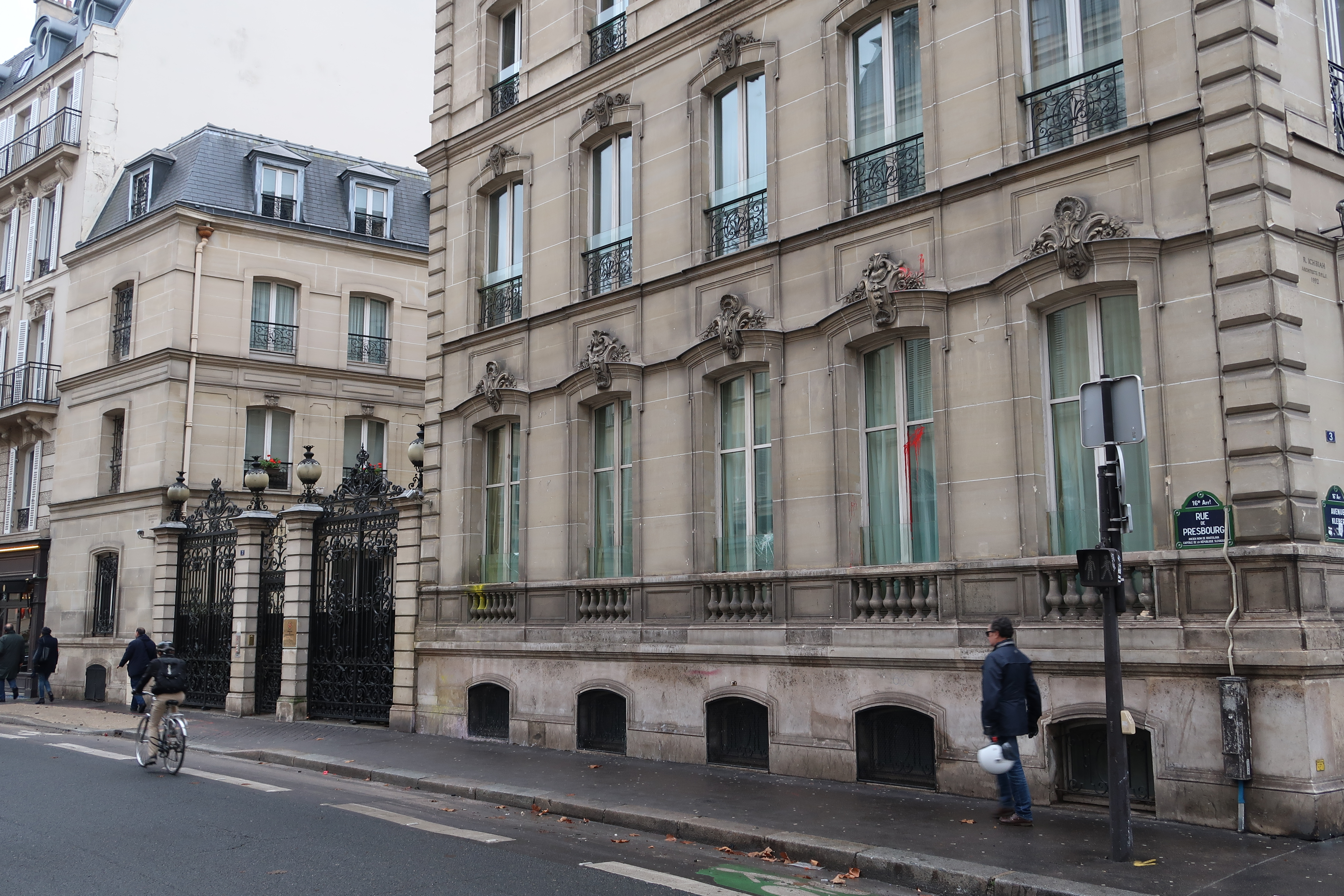
Side view of the embassy's main entrance

== See also ==
- Brunei–France relations
