= Abdu'r Rahmani =

Bruneian military officer and diplomat (born 1954)

His Excellency Pehin Orang Kaya Seri Pahlawan Colonel (Retired) Dato Paduka Abdu'r Rahmani DPMB SLJ PHBS
- ابدوءر رحماني
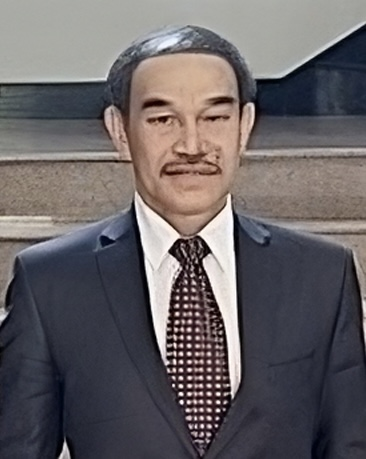
- Ambassador Abdu'r Rahmani in 2022

5th Commander of the Royal Brunei Land Forces
- In office 15 March 2003 – 1 July 2005
- Monarch: Hassanal Bolkiah
- Preceded by: Halbi Mohd Yussof
- Succeeded by: Rosli Chuchu
Diplomatic positions
Ambassador of Brunei to China
Incumbent
Assumed office 22 November 2019
Preceded by	Magdalene Teo
Ambassador of Brunei to Myanmar
In office 2014 – September 2019
Preceded by	Yusof Abu Bakar
Succeeded by	Husaini Alauddin

Personal details
- Born: 28 July 1954 (age 72) Brunei
- Spouse: Pengiran Aishah
- Parent: Basir Taha (father)
- Education: Officer Cadet School
- Profession: Military officer; diplomat

Military service
- Allegiance: Brunei
- Branch/service: Royal Brunei Land Force
- Years of service: 1975–2005
- Rank: Colonel
- Unit: 'D' Company RBMR; Third Battalion RBMR
- Commands: Training Institute RBAF; Royal Brunei Land Forces

Abdu'r Rahmani bin Haji Basir (born 28 July 1954) is a Bruneian aristocrat, diplomat and retired military officer who was the commander of the Royal Brunei Land Forces (RBLF) from 2003 until 2005.

== Military career ==
After completing basic training, Abdu'r Rahmani joined the Officer Cadet School in Singapore and joined Royal Brunei Malay Regiment (RBMR) 11 August 1975. He was commissioned as Second Lieutenant on 8 May 1976, and commanding officer of 'D' Company First Battalion RBMR. Later, he became the aide-de-camp (ADC) to the Sultan of Brunei in 1983, commanding officer of Third Battalion RBMR, commander of Training Institute Royal Brunei Armed Forces (TI RBAF) from 2001 to 2002, and Commander of the RBLF from 15 March 2003 to 1 July 2005.

== Diplomatic career ==
=== Myanmar ===
After his military career, he became a diplomat with the Ministry of Foreign Affairs. On 11 May 2014, Sultan Hassanal Bolkiah left Myanmar after taking part in the 24th ASEAN Summit. Abdu'r Rahmani, the Ambassador of Brunei Darussalam to Myanmar, was there to bid farewell at the airport. On 6 September 2019, at the Presidential Palace in Nay Pyi Taw, President U Win Myint welcomed departing Abdu'r Rahmani, who has served his term in Myanmar. At noon on the 11th, Daw Aung San Suu Kyi, hosted a farewell lunch for him and his spouse. Later on the 14th, Min Aung Hlaing welcomed a delegation led by him, where they candidly discussed how to further solidify the cordial ties between the two nations' armed forces.

The idea got some traction last week when Brunei signed an agreement that would, in theory, see it shift its diplomatic presence to the capital. The government is now pressing on with plans to encourage the transfer of foreign embassies from Yangon to Nay Pyi Taw. Abdu'r Rahmani and U Myint Thu agreed on a "reciprocal exchange of land for the construction of diplomatic presences" on 14 February 2018.

Brunei concurs with ASEAN's hopes that sports may contribute in a variety of ways, including to raising health standards, promoting regional cohesion, and building a sense of patriotism and competitiveness in society. Abdu'r Rahmani, who was in charge of the Brunei delegation at the 4th ASEAN Ministerial Meeting on Sports, made the remark on behalf of the Minister of Culture, Youth, and Sports.

=== China ===
At the Great Hall of the People on the afternoon of 22 November 2019, President Xi Jinping accepted credentials from newly appointed ambassadors from 19 foreign nations to China. Among the recently chosen Ambassadors to China was Abdu'r Rahmani. Nong Rong, the assistant foreign minister, met with Abdu'r Rahmani, the Ambassador of Brunei to China, on 17 August 2023. The two parties discussed their perspectives on bilateral interactions and collaboration. He asserted that the two nations' governments and citizens take great pride in their close connection.

== Personal life ==
Abdu'r Rahmani is the son of Dato Paduka Haji Basir bin Taha (born 3 November 1913), Secretary to Prince Omar Ali Saifuddien in 1948. He married Pengiran Datin Hajah Aishah binti Pengiran Ismail, and together they are known to have three sons and a daughter. He has a brother of aristocracy, Mahdini.

== Honours ==
Abdu'r Rahmani was awarded the Manteri title of Pehin Orang Kaya Seri Pahlawan on 17 April 2004. Known honours awarded to him are;

National

- Order of Seri Paduka Mahkota Brunei Second Class (DPMB; 2003) – Dato Paduka
- Order of Seri Paduka Mahkota Brunei Third Class (SMB; 1982)
- Order of Paduka Seri Laila Jasa Third Class (SLJ)
- Sultan Hassanal Bolkiah Medal (PHBS)
- Silver Jubilee Medal (5 October 1992)
- Royal Brunei Armed Forces Silver Jubilee Medal (31 May 1986)
- General Service Medal
- Long Service Medal and Good Conduct (PKLPB)
- Proclamation of Independence Medal (1997)

Foreign

- Singapore:
  - Pingat Jasa Gemilang (Tentera) (PJG; 25 February 2005)

Diplomatic posts
Preceded by Magdalene Teo	Ambassador of Brunei to China; 22 November 2019 – present	Incumbent
Preceded by Yusof Abu Bakar	Ambassador of Brunei to Myanmar; 2014 – September 2019	Succeeded by Husaini Alauddin
Military offices
Preceded by Halbi Mohd Yussof	5th Commander of the Royal Brunei Land Forces; 15 March 2003 – 1 July 2005	Succeeded by Rosli Chuchu
Preceded by Abas Bagol	13th Commander of the Training Institute; 2 January 2001 – 1 March 2002	Succeeded by Muhammad Yaakub
