= Pengiran Krtini =

Bruneian diplomat

Her Excellency Krtini Tahir
- ڤڠيرن قرتيني

Ambassador of Brunei to Germany
- Incumbent
- Assumed office 20 August 2020
- Preceded by: Rakiah Abdul Lamit

Personal details
- Born: Dayangku Krtini binti Pengiran Haji Mohd Tahir; 6 June 1966 (age 60) Brunei
- Parent: Pengiran Haji Mohd Tahir Pengiran Haji Ismail (father)
- Education: Universiti Brunei Darussalam (BA)
- Occupation: Diplomat

Pengiran Hajah Krtini binti Pengiran Haji Mohd Tahir (born 6 June 1966) is a Bruneian diplomat who became the incumbent ambassador to Germany since 2020.

== Education ==
Pengiran Krtini received her Bachelor of Arts (B.A.) in economics at the University of Brunei Darussalam (UBD).

== Diplomatic career ==
=== Early career ===
Pengiran Krtini began as a research officer at the Department of Politics of the Ministry of Foreign Affairs (MFA) from 1989 to 1995; research officer at the Department of Multilateral Economics of the MFA from 1995 to 1998; the first secretary at the High Commission of Brunei Darussalam in London, United Kingdom from 1998 to 2002; assistant director at the Department of Politics I of the MFA from 2002 to 2003; the assistant director at the Department of Politics II of the MFA from 2004 to 2005; the assistant director at the Department of Multilateral Economics of the MFA from 2005 to 2006; and the first secretary at the Technical Cooperation Division at the MFA from 2006 to 2007.

=== Malaysia ===
Pengiran Krtini's first overseas posting since London in 1998, was becoming the consul general at the Consulate General of Brunei Darusslam in Kuching, Sarawak from 2016 to 2020. After meeting with Krtini on 9 August 2016, Datuk Lee Kim Shin disclosed that he has agreements with two Chinese cities: Wuhan in the Hubei province and Shijiazhuang in the Hebei province. He added that the Bruneian Consul General had conveyed the government's desire to collaborate closely with Sarawak in boosting tourism.

=== Germany ===
Pengiran Krtini would later on be reappointed as the ambassador of Brunei to Berlin, Germany in August 2020. She would also be the non-resident ambassador to Austria and Switzerland. On 20 August 2020, she gave Frank-Walter Steinmeier her letter of accreditation. After then, she was accredited as an ambassador to Finland, Iceland, Austria, Norway, Poland, and Switzerland without a residence. Krtini and the other recently selected ambassadors to Austria gave President Alexander Van der Bellen their credentials at Bellevue Castle, on 7 July 2022. Later on 17 February, President Sauli Niinistö, got credentials from her. On 13 April 2023, King Harald V received the letters of credence from her, one of the three new ambassadors to Norway.

== Personal life ==
Pengiran Krtini is multilingual in English, Malay and Arabic. She is married to Haji Kamsani bin Haji Noordin, a former diplomat, with 4 children.

Diplomatic posts
Preceded by Rakiah Abdul Lamit	Ambassador of Brunei to Germany; 20 August 2020–present	Succeeded by Incumbent
