= Brunei–China relations =

- Brunei: China

Diplomatic mission
- Embassy of Brunei, Beijing: Embassy of China, Bandar Seri Begawan

Envoy
- Ambassador Abdu'r Rahmani: Ambassador Xiao Jianguo

Brunei and China established formal diplomatic relations in 1991. Brunei has an embassy in Beijing, and China has an embassy in Bandar Seri Begawan.

== History ==
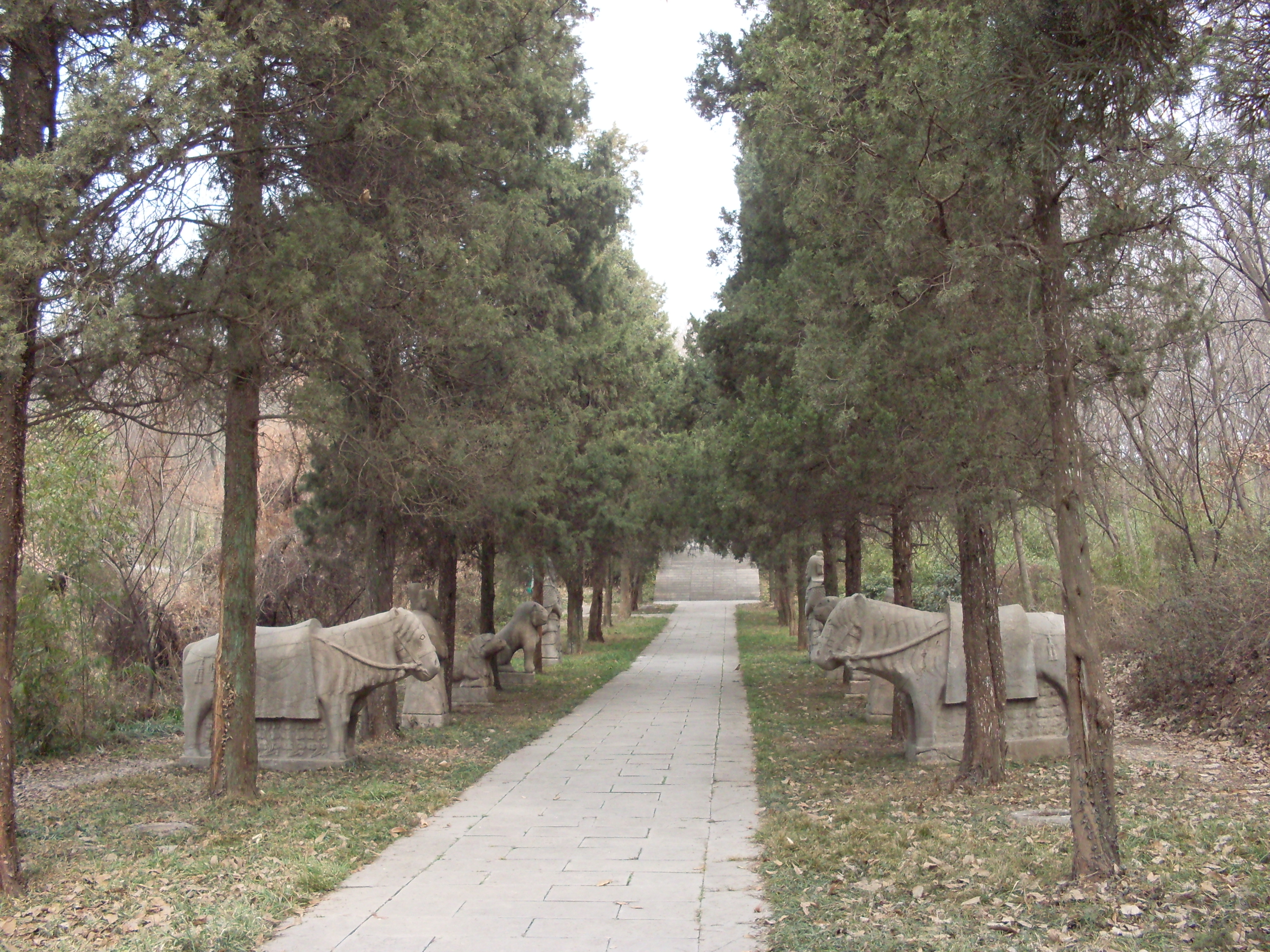
The tomb of a chieftain from Borneo in Nanjing, China.

Direct contact between China and Brunei dates back to at least the 10th century, as evidenced by the discovery of Chinese artifacts at Kampong Limau Manis in Brunei Darussalam. Over 50,000 ceramic shards, dated between the 10th and 14th centuries, have been unearthed at the site, indicating a long-standing relationship between the two regions.

In 1932, the Republic of China declared the Paracel Islands as its southernmost territory, excluding the Spratly Islands, where Brunei has a claim.

During Brunei's period as a British protectorate (19th century–1984), direct relations with China were limited. After gaining independence on 1 January 1984, Brunei joined ASEAN in 1991, formalizing diplomatic relations with China.

In June 2013, the Chinese naval hospital ship Peace Ark visited Brunei.

In 2019, Chinese leader and General Secretary of the Chinese Communist Party Xi Jinping visited Brunei. His visit was described in local media as a significant diplomatic event. Chinese investments such as the Hengyi Petrochemical Complex and StarCity Brunei have been noted for their contributions to the local economy.

== Economic relations ==
In 2011, trade between China and Brunei reached approximately US$1.3 billion,. The two nations have focused on cooperation in areas such as infrastructure development, agriculture, and fisheries.

In 2014, the two countries established the Brunei-Guangxi Economic Corridor, with pledged joint investments of approximately US$500 million.

Brunei joined the Belt and Road Initiative (BRI) in 2018.

Following the 2026 United States strikes in Venezuela, a refinery operated by a joint venture of Zhejiang Hengyi Petrochemical Co. and Brunei's state-owned Damai Holdings stated that it would double its capacity.

== See also ==
- Ethnic Chinese in Brunei
- Bruneian Ambassador to China
