= Kefli Razali =

Bruneian naval officer (born 1940)

Yang Dimuliakan Pehin Datu Juragan Laila Diraja Colonel (Retired) Dato Seri Pahlawan Kefli Razali PSPNB DPMB SLJ PHBS
- كفلي غزالي
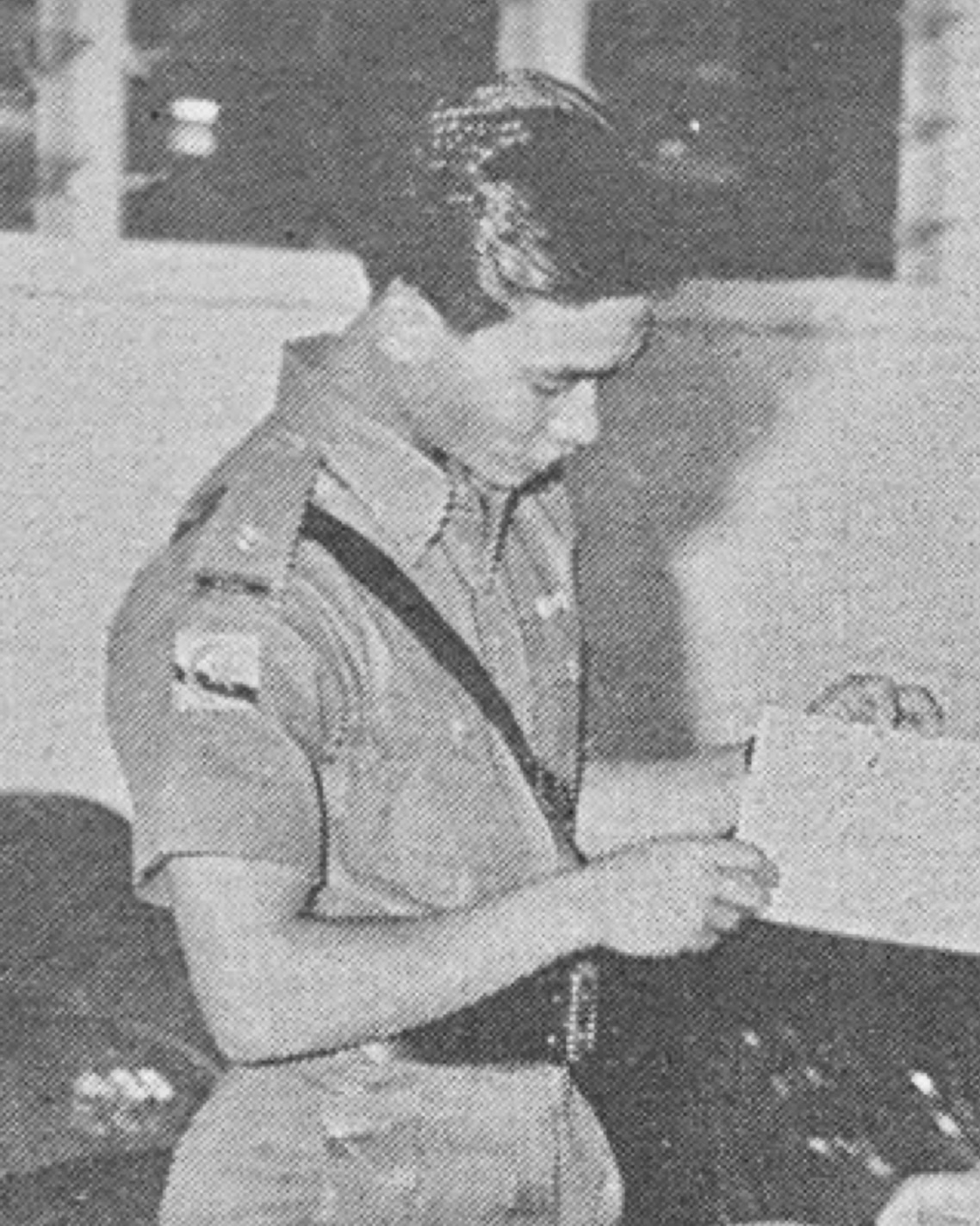
- Junior lieutenant Kefli in 1966

2nd Commander of the Royal Brunei Navy
- In office 25 June 1993 – 3 February 1995
- Monarch: Hassanal Bolkiah
- Preceded by: Abdul Latif Damit
- Succeeded by: Abdul Jalil Ahmad
- In office 22 April 1983 – 30 September 1986
- Preceded by: Pengiran Ibnu Basit
- Succeeded by: Noeh Abdul Hamid

Personal details
- Born: 6 October 1940 (age 85) Kuala Balai, Belait, Brunei
- Children: 4
- Profession: Military officer

Military service
- Allegiance: Brunei
- Branch/service: Royal Brunei Navy
- Years of service: 1967–1995
- Rank: Colonel
- Unit: SR.N5; SR.N6; KDB Pahlawan (P-01); Raja Isteri-class patrol boat
- Commands: Raja Isteri-class patrol boat; Royal Brunei Navy; Director of Personnel

Kefli bin Haji Razali (born 6 October 1940) is a Bruneian aristocrat and retired military officer who became the second commander of the Royal Brunei Navy (RBN) from 1983 to 1986 and from 1993 to 1995.

== Early life and education ==
On 6 October 1940, Kefli was born in Kampong Kuala Balai, to a nobleman, Orang Kaya Laila Setia Haji Razali. After being moved from Rifle Company AMDB, he began his career in 1967 in the RBN's Boat Section. There are only two officers at that time: himself in the role of second in command (2IC) and Captain Mc Ivay of the Loan Service in the role of officer in command. On 28 May 1970, Captain Kefli departed for Australia to undergo naval training before to assuming command of a brand-new patrol boat, KDB Saleha, measuring 62 feet (19 m).

== Military career ==
Kefli boarded a cargo vessel in Southampton while attending basic navigation course earlier in his career. He became the first local officer to enroll in the UK's "Sub-Lieutenant Course." He also had the opportunity to board a Royal Navy ship for a lengthy navigational training voyage that passed via South Africa's Cape of Good Hope on its way from Liverpool to Singapore. After completing the hovercraft training on the Isle of Wight in the UK, he became the first local officer to have the hovercraft pilot SR.N5 and SR.N6 certifications. He has also served as the executive officer and subsequently the commanding officer of a number of other ships and boats, including KDB Pahlawan (P-01) and Raja Isteri-class patrol boats.

One of Kefli's most memorable experiences as a member of the RBN was pulling an AML ship that was damaged after it collided with a fishing vessel near Ujong Tanjong Sapuh. Twice, he was granted the privilege of leading the RBN. The first occurred between 22 April 1983 and 30 September 1986, while the second took place between 25 June 1993 and 3 February 1995. While still being the commander of the RBN, he also co-currently held the position of director of personnel from 1 March 1990 to 3 January 1994.

1995 saw his retirement. Despite this, he still inspected the guard of honour at the Ministry of Defence in Bukit Gombak during the Pingat Jasa Gemilang (Tentera) award ceremony on 4 August 1995, during his three-day official visit to Singapore.

== Later life ==
Kefli and other around 60 former Kampong Kuala Balai inhabitants worked together to clean the Muslim cemetery area in the hamlet.

== Personal life ==
Kefli has four sons. His son, Muhammad Faisal, is a judicial commissioner of the Supreme Court, while Commander Malek Fadillah became the commander of KDB Daruttaqwa (09).

== Titles, styles and honours ==
=== Title and style ===
Kefli was awarded the Manteri title of Yang Dimuliakan Pehin Datu Juragan Laila Diraja by Sultan Hassanal Bolkiah.

=== Honours ===
He has known to be given the following honours:

National

- Order of Pahlawan Negara Brunei First Class (PSPNB) – Dato Seri Pahlawan
- Order of Seri Paduka Mahkota Brunei Second Class (DPMB) – Dato Paduka
- Order of Paduka Seri Laila Jasa Third Class (SLJ)
- Sultan Hassanal Bolkiah Medal (PHBS)
- Meritorious Service Medal (PJK)
- Royal Brunei Armed Forces Silver Jubilee Medal (31 May 1986)
- General Service Medal
- Inauguration Medal (31 May 1965)

Foreign

- Singapore:
  - Pingat Jasa Gemilang (Tentera) (PJG; 4 August 1995)
- Selangor:
  - Sultan Salahuddin Silver Jubilee Medal (3 September 1985)

Military offices
Preceded by Pengiran Ibnu Basit; Abdul Latif Damit	2nd Commander of the Royal Brunei Navy; 22 April 1983 – 30 September 1986; 25 June 1993 – 3 February 1995	Succeeded by Noeh Abdul Hamid; Abdul Jalil Ahmad
