= Old Airport, Brunei =

Site of former original airport in Brunei Darussalam

Brunei Airport Lapangan Terbang Brunei
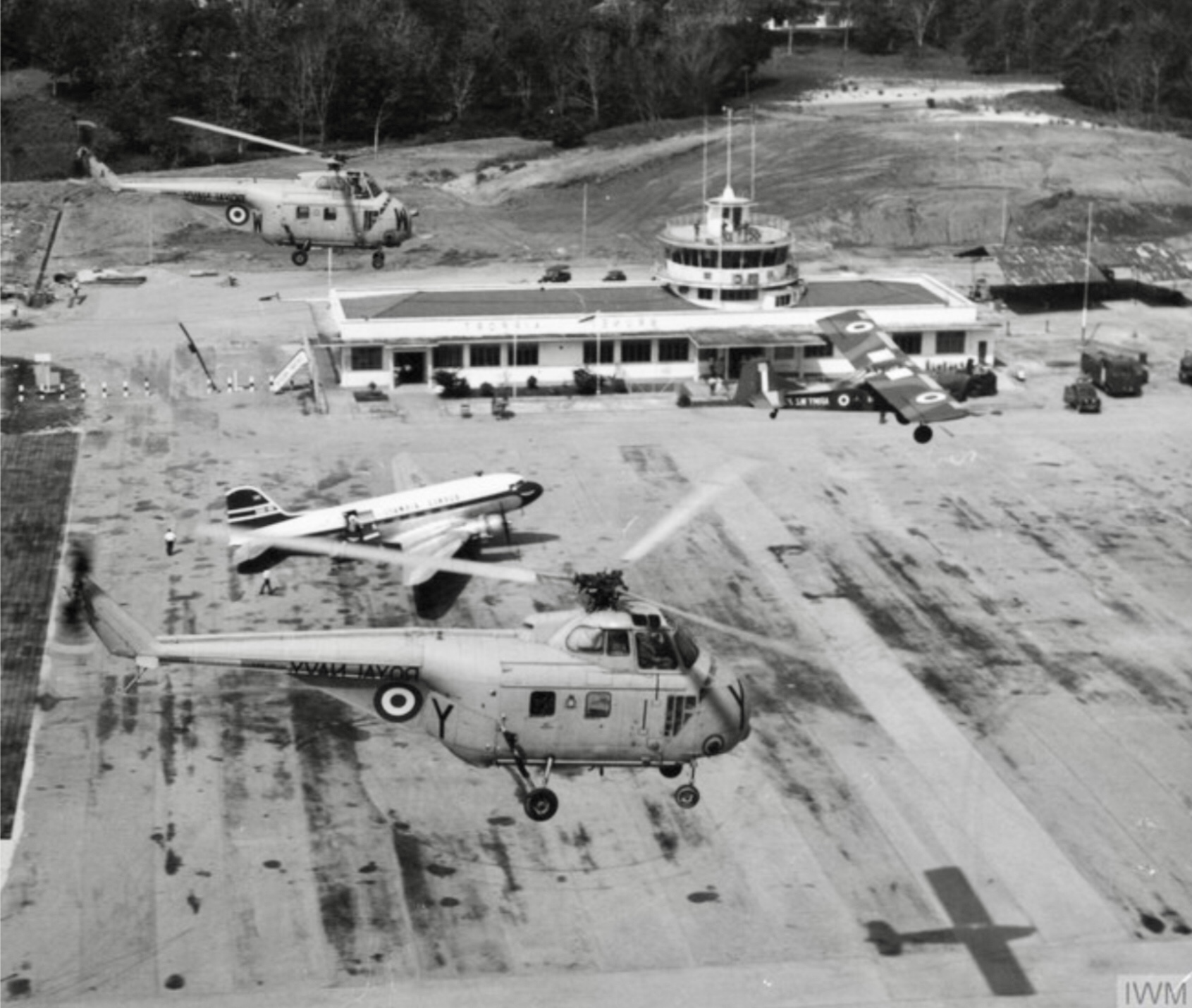
- Brunei Airport being operated by the Royal Navy during the Brunei revolt in 1962.
- IATA: BTN; ICAO: none

Summary
- Airport type: Defunct
- Serves: Brunei Darussalam
- Location: Berakas, Brunei-Muara District
- Opened: 1953
- Closed: 1974
- Coordinates: 4°55′21″N 114°55′53″E

Map
- Brunei-Muara District in Brunei Darussalam

Old Airport (Malay: Lapangan Terbang Lama) is an area in Berakas, near the city of Bandar Seri Begawan, in the Sultanate of Brunei Darussalam. It is the common name given to the former site of the original Brunei Airport (hence the name), and is now the location of several government offices.

== Name ==
The reason the location is known as the Old Airport is because it is the site of the former Brunei Airport, prior to the establishment of the present-day Brunei International Airport (BIA) which opened in 1974. The air traffic control tower and other parts of the former Brunei Airport Terminal Building are currently occupied by the Government Printing Department offices.

== History ==
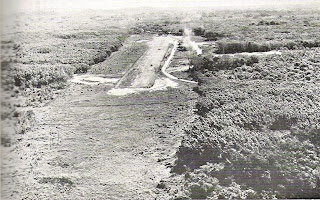
The post-war airfield seen in 1953.

During the Japanese occupation of British Borneo during World War II, the first runway was built in Brunei Darussalam. The Japanese fighter aircraft that were arriving to defend their captured territory then exploited this fledgling aerodrome. Even though the Allied Forces extensively attacked it, those same forces rebuilt and upgraded the runaway after the war, and a proper airport was designed and constructed, and named Brunei Airport.

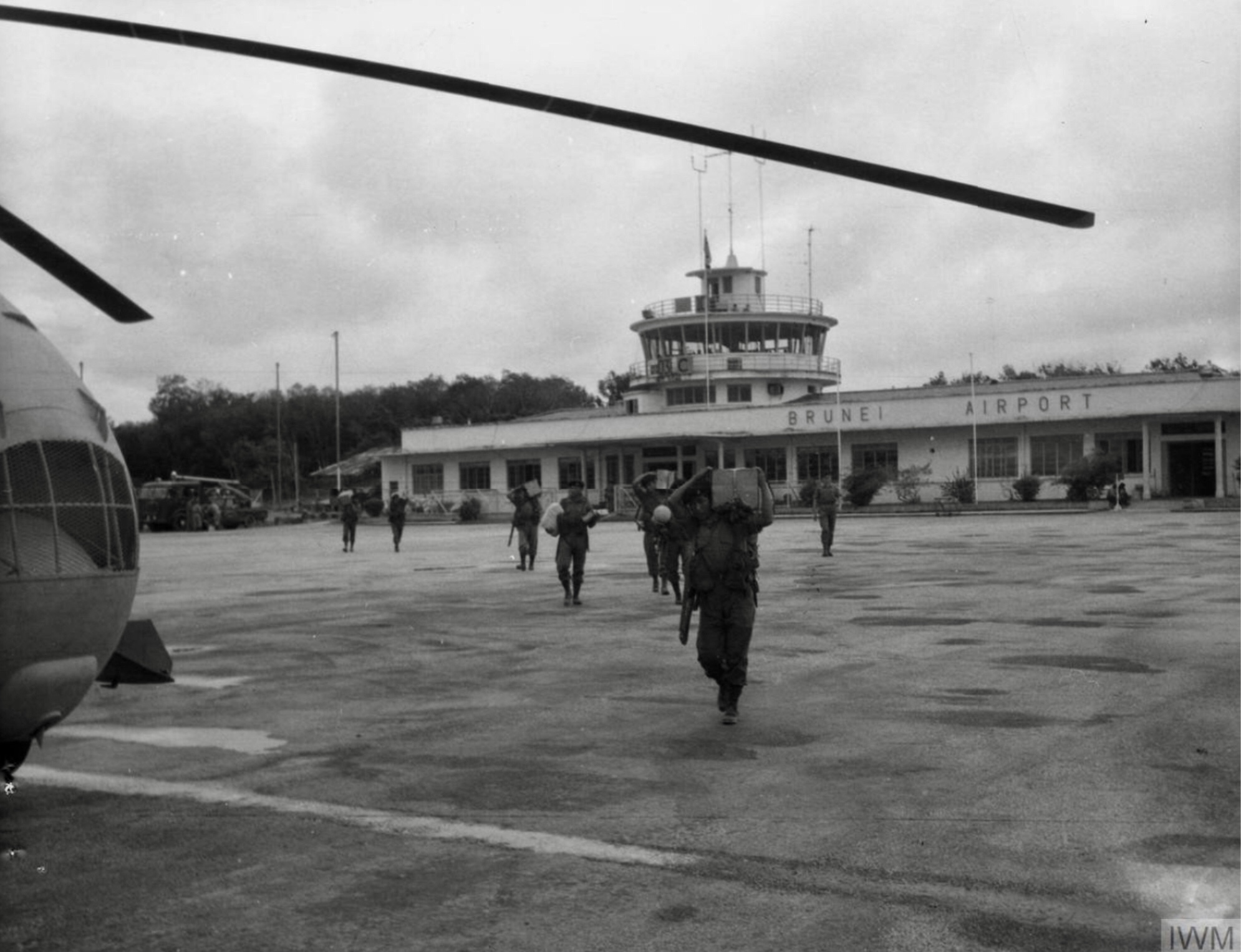
1st Queen's Own Highlanders approaching from the airport's terminal building in 1962.

Only in 1953, when internal air service linkages were established between Pekan Brunei (Brunei Town) and Anduki (which serves the oil town of Seria) in the Belait District, did commercial aviation in Brunei start. In order to serve passengers from Labuan in Sabah and Lutong in Sarawak, the first international flights were operated to the Malaysian states of Sarawak and Sabah.

Around 4,300 people used the Brunei Airport in 1955, when Malayan Airways, using British-built de Havilland Rapide aircraft, began operating flights between Brunei Town, Anduki, Miri, and Labuan. At that time, the only aircraft that Brunei Airport could handle were the de Havilland Rapide, the Douglas DC-3, and eventually the Fokker F27 Friendship. All of these aircraft were turboprops with two engines. On 8 May 1957, the kajang terminal building was replaced by the Old Airport Terminal Building, featuring a large lobby, a bar, and a passenger stopover.

Shortly after the British took control of the airport during the Brunei revolt on 10 December 1962; 63 years ago, soldiers of the 1st Queen's Own Highlanders were unloading supplies from a Blackburn Beverley operated by No. 34 Squadron RAF. This was followed by several other aircraft, which included Handley Page Hastings, Auster AOP.9, and Westland Wessex.

The popularity of air travel significantly increased throughout the 1970s. The former Brunei Airport was overbooked and overrun with traffic. Due to the necessity to accommodate the increasing number of users, the authorities set out to find a new location for the construction of a modern international airport. Construction on the brand-new Brunei International Airport, which serves Bruneians in Berakas, started in 1970, and was finished in 1974.

== Government offices ==
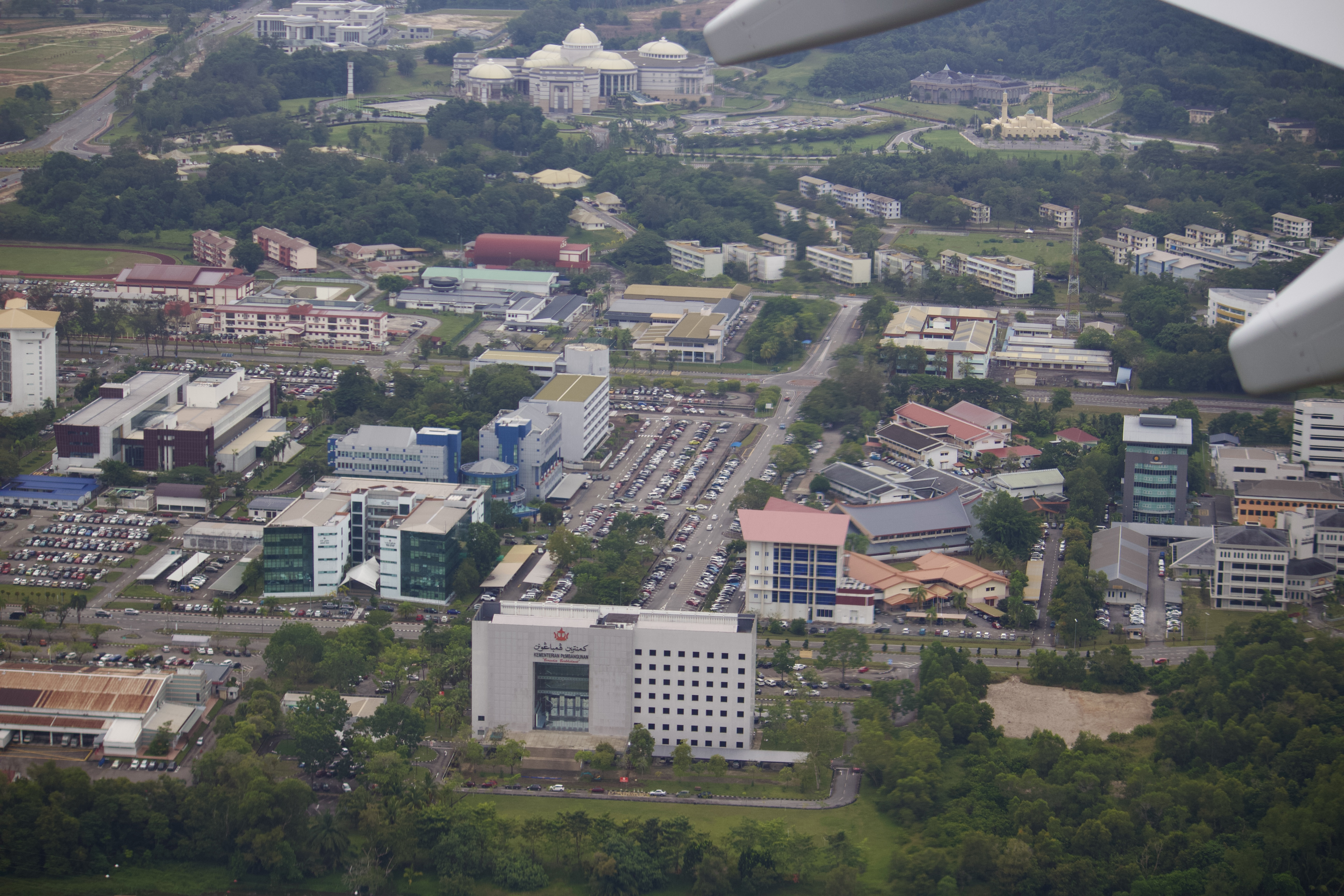
Government buildings seen at the site of the former Brunei Airport in 2022.

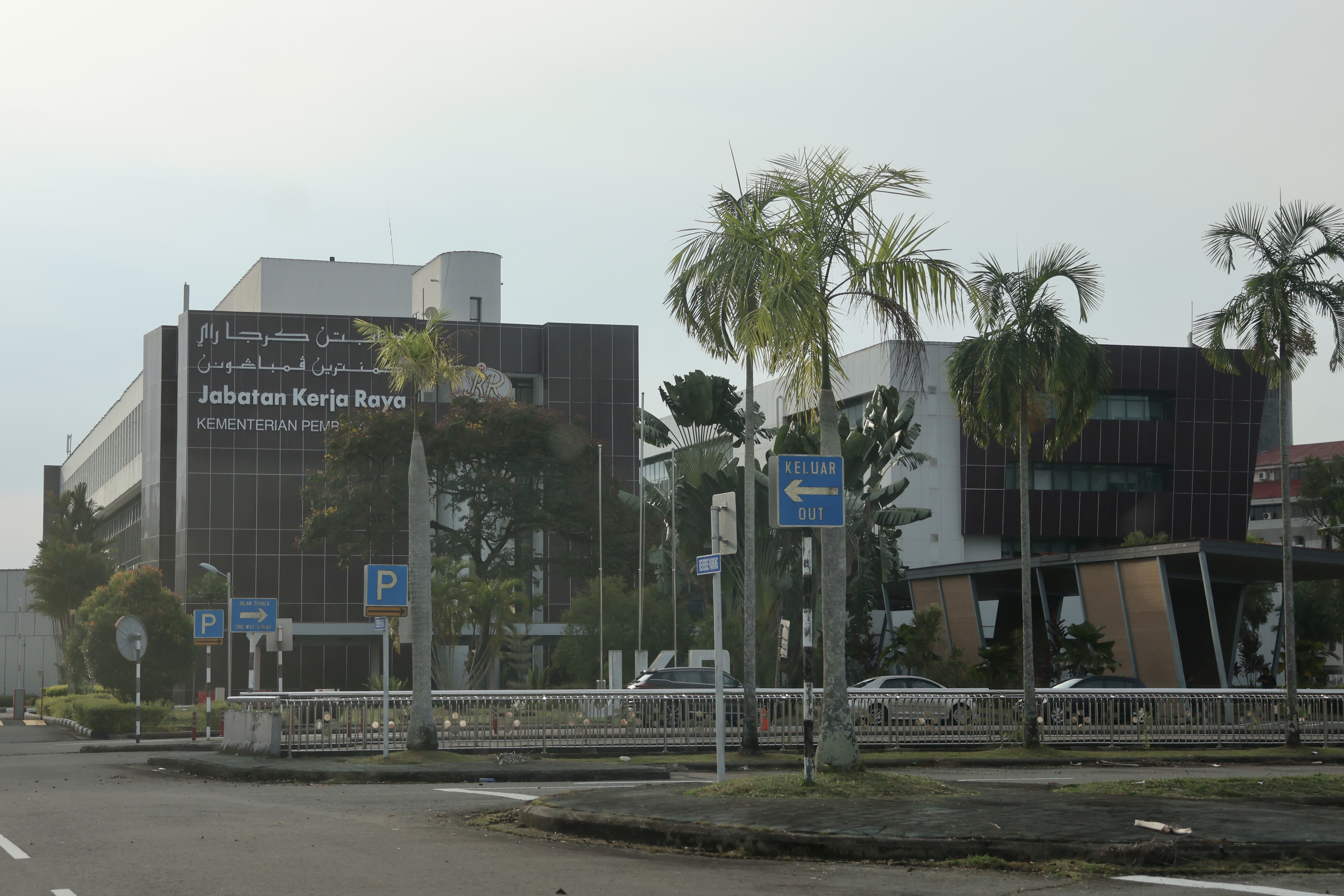
Public Works Department Headquarters.

The former terminal building of the Brunei Airport has become the office of the Government Printing Department. Its vicinity is also the location of various government buildings which belong to two ministries and several government departments. These include:

- Ministry of Education
- Ministry of Development
- Mail Processing Centre
- Public Works Department
- Brunei-Muara District Office
- Public Service Commission
- Department of Electrical Services
- Housing Development Department
- Dewan Bahasa dan Pustaka Brunei
- Information Department
- Anti-Corruption Bureau
- Agriculture Department
- Survey Department
- Land Department
- Fire and Rescue Department
- Government Printing Department
