= Brunei–Pakistan relations =

- Pakistan: Brunei

The diplomatic relationship between Pakistan and Brunei is very warm and friendly, primarily because both are Muslim countries and members of the Organisation of Islamic Cooperation. As the two countries are fellow members of the Commonwealth, Pakistan maintains a High Commission in Bandar Seri Begawan, and Brunei has a High Commission in Islamabad. To further foster ties between the two countries, the Brunei-Pakistan Friendship Association (BPFA) was created in 2008.

== History ==
Originally Pakistan did not support the non-inclusion of Brunei to the Federation of Malaysia, the other was the separation of Singapore. Later, relations were established on 9 February 1984 when Malaysia established relations with Brunei.

== Trade links ==
Trade links between the two countries are small, largely because of Brunei's small size. The current trade volume between the two countries stands at US$5 million. To foster trade and investment between the two countries, the Pakistan-Brunei Joint Investment Company was created in November 2006. Areas like the oil and gas sector, real estate, hotels, telecommunications and halal meat projects are some sectors where the two countries can benefit.

== Defence co-operation ==
Defence co-operation between the two countries remains strong. Brunei Darussalam and the Islamic Republic of Pakistan signed a Memorandum of Understanding on Defence Cooperation on 19 May 2004. Pakistan has so far trained up to 100 Bruneians at Pakistani military academies. In November 2008, the Defence Secretary of Pakistan, Lieutenant General (Rtd) Athar Ali, paid an official visit to Brunei to boost defence co-operation between the two countries. In October 2010, the Pakistan naval ship (PNS) SAIF docked at Muara Port to celebrate defence relations and goodwill between Brunei and Pakistan.

Pakistan was scheduled to participate in the third Brunei International Defence Exhibition (BRIDEX 2011), and invited Brunei to participate in the International Defence Exhibition and Seminar (IDEAS 2010). Pakistan has also invited the naval forces of Brunei to participate in Pakistan's multinational naval exercise, Aman. In February 2020, Zafar Mahmood Abbasi, Chief of Naval Staff of the Pakistan Navy, visited Brunei, where he toured a Darussalam-class offshore patrol vessel.

== See also ==
- Malaysia–Pakistan relations
- Pakistan–Singapore relations
