= Kuala Belait Library =

Public library in Kuala Belait, Brunei

- Perpustakaan Dewan Bahasa dan Pustaka Daerah Belait
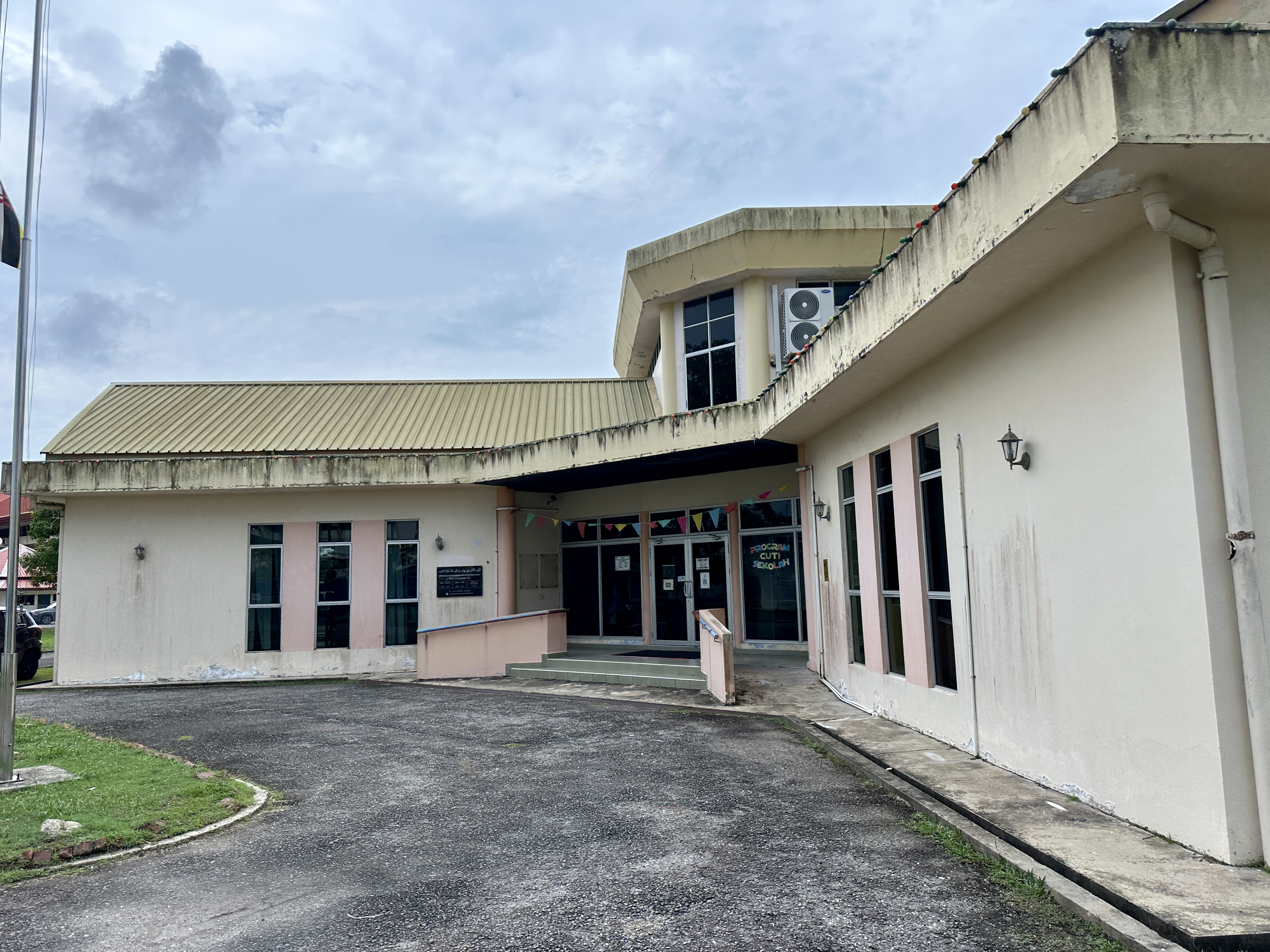
- The library in 2024
- 4°35′10.5″N 114°11′32.0″E
- Location: Kuala Belait, Brunei
- Type: Public library
- Established: 14 July 1975
- Branch of: Dewan Bahasa dan Pustaka Library

Daerah Belait Library (Malay: Perpustakaan Daerah Belait, officially Perpustakaan Dewan Bahasa dan Pustaka Kuala Belait) is a public library located in Kuala Belait, Brunei. It is one of the public libraries operated by Dewan Bahasa dan Pustaka Brunei.

== History ==
The library was established on 14 July 1975, initially located at Jalan Bunga Raya. It moved to the present building at Jalan Padang in 1986, which was inaugurated by Princess Masna on 19 June in that year.
