= Lambak Kanan Library =

Public library in Lambak Kanan, Brunei

- Perpustakaan Lambak Kanan; Perpustakaan Dewan Bahasa dan Pustaka Lambak Kanan
- 4°59′02″N 114°58′31″E
- Location: Lambak Kanan, Brunei
- Type: Public library
- Established: 18 March 2008
- Branch of: Dewan Bahasa dan Pustaka Library

Lambak Kanan Library (Malay: Perpustakaan Lambak Kanan, officially Perpustakaan Dewan Bahasa dan Pustaka Lambak Kanan) is a public library located in Lambak Kanan area in Brunei-Muara, Brunei. It is one of the public libraries operated by Dewan Bahasa dan Pustaka Brunei.

== History ==
The construction of the building began in 2005 and it took two years to complete. On 18 March 2008, the library was officially opened by the then Minister of Culture, Youth and Sports. The cost of the construction was B$975,525 ($720,000 as of December 2017).
