= Sengkurong Library =

- Perpustakaan Sengkurong; Perpustakaan Dewan Bahasa dan Pustaka Sengkurong
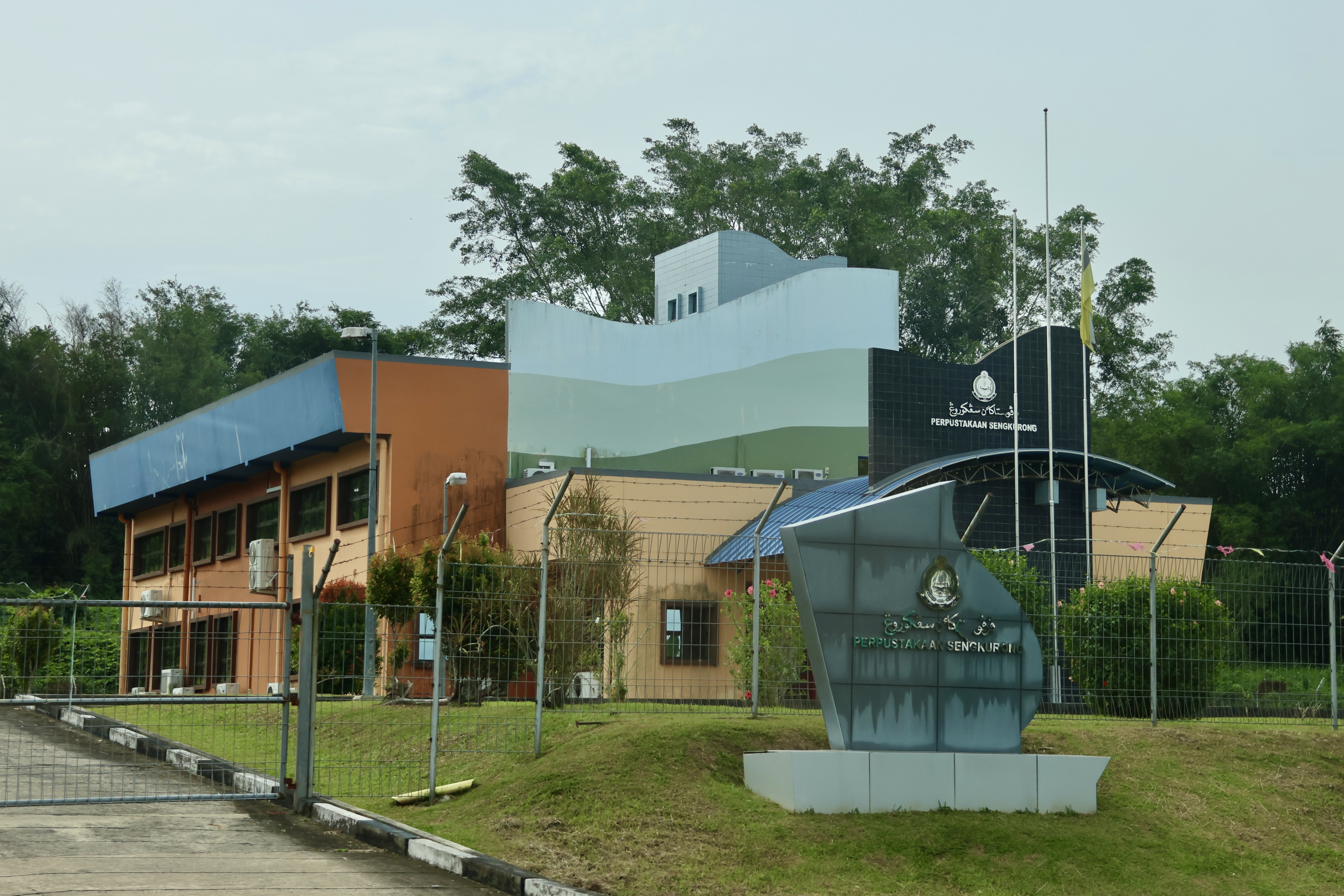
- Sengkurong Library in 2023
- 4°53′07.1″N 114°50′14.0″E
- Location: Sengkurong, Brunei-Muara, Brunei
- Type: Public library
- Branch of: Dewan Bahasa dan Pustaka Library

Sengkurong Library (Malay: Perpustakaan Sengkurong) is a public library located in Sengkurong in Brunei-Muara District, Brunei. Officially known in Malay as Perpustakaan Dewan Bahasa dan Pustaka Sengkurong, it is one of the public libraries operated by Dewan Bahasa dan Pustaka Brunei.
