= Tutong District Library =

Public library in Tutong, Brunei

- Perpustakaan Daerah Tutong; Perpustakaan Dewan Bahasa dan Pustaka Daerah Tutong
- 4°49′00.2″N 114°39′33.5″E
- Location: Bukit Bendera, Tutong, Brunei
- Type: Public library
- Established: 1 September 1975
- Branch of: Dewan Bahasa dan Pustaka Library

Tutong District Library (Malay: Perpustakaan Daerah Tutong, officially Perpustakaan Dewan Bahasa dan Pustaka Daerah Tutong) is a public library located in Tutong, Brunei. The library is one of the public libraries operated by Dewan Bahasa dan Pustaka Brunei. It is the only public library in Tutong District.

== History ==
The library was established on 1 September 1975, initially at Jalan Enche Awang. The construction of what is eventually the current building in Bukit Bendera began on 9 May 1990 and was completed in about two years. It was inaugurated on 21 July 1992 by Sultan Hassanal Bolkiah in conjunction with His Majesty's 46th birthday celebration in the district.
