= Temburong District Library =

- Perpustakaan Daerah Temburong; Perpustakaan Dewan Bahasa dan Pustaka Daerah Temburong
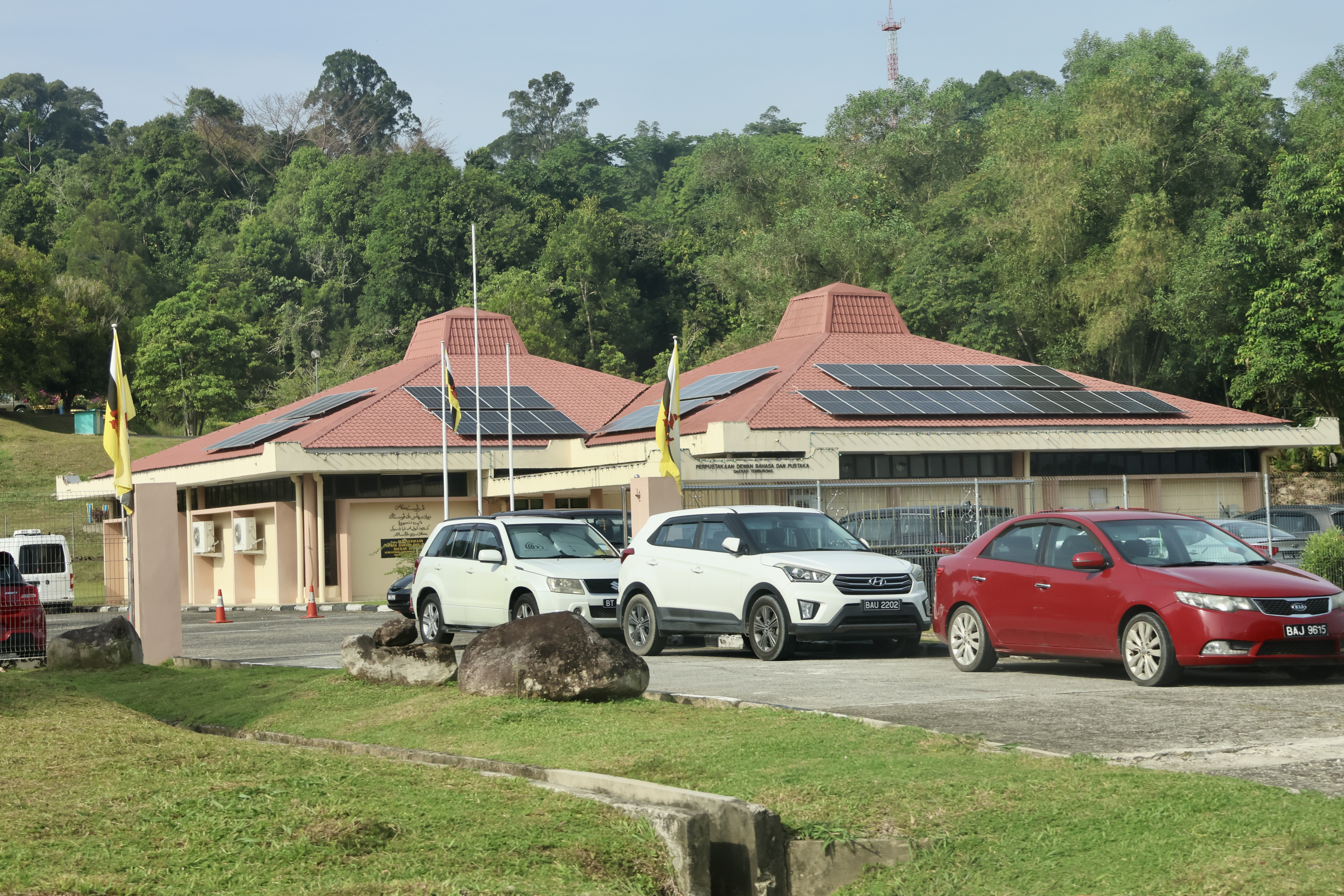
- Temburong District Library in 2023
- 4°42′37.3″N 115°04′50.5″E
- Location: Bangar, Temburong, Brunei
- Type: Public library
- Established: 8 December 1975
- Branch of: Dewan Bahasa dan Pustaka Library

Temburong District Library (Malay: Perpustakaan Daerah Temburong, officially Perpustakaan Dewan Bahasa dan Pustaka Daerah Temburong) is a public library located in Bangar, Brunei. The library is operated by Dewan Bahasa dan Pustaka Brunei, which also manages all other public libraries in the country. It is the only public library in Temburong District.

== History ==
The library was established on 8 December 1975, but for several years it had no dedicated building; the library was housed at a few temporary locations in the town of Bangar. The present building was only used from 22 July 1993 and has since been the permanent location of the library.
