= Seria Library =

Library in Belait, Brunei

- Perpustakaan Seria; Perpustakaan Dewan Bahasa dan Pustaka Seria
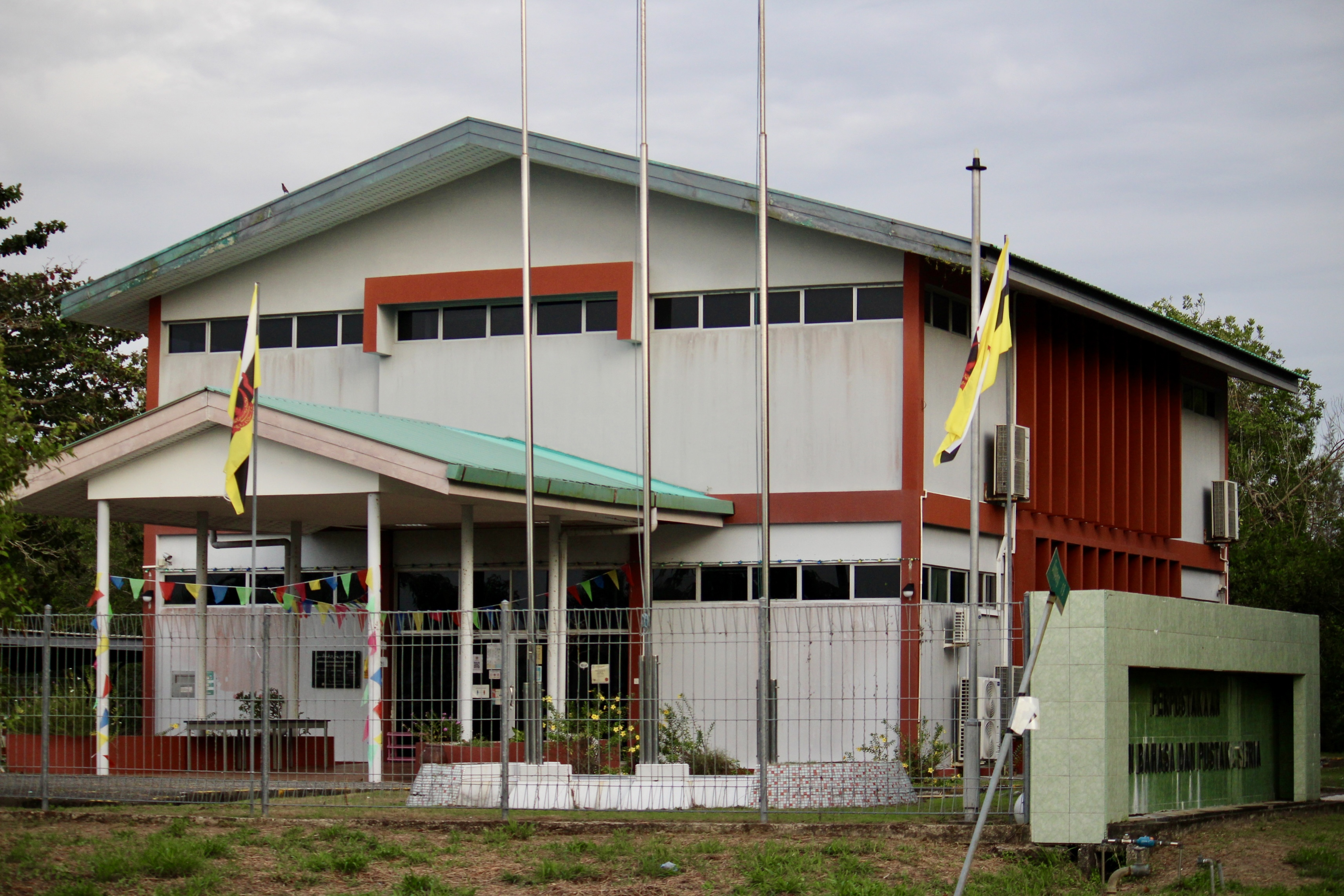
- 4°36′23.3″N 114°19′58.9″E
- Location: Seria, Belait, Brunei
- Type: Public library
- Established: 12 February 1977
- Branch of: Dewan Bahasa dan Pustaka Library

Seria Library (Malay: Perpustakaan Seria) is a public library located in Seria, a town in Belait, Brunei. Officially known in Malay as Perpustakaan Dewan Bahasa dan Pustaka Seria, it is one of the public libraries operated by Dewan Bahasa dan Pustaka Brunei.

== History ==
Seria Library was established on 12 February 1977, initially at Jalan Bunga Melur. The library was then moved to the present building at Lorong Bolkiah, in which it was inaugurated on 28 February 1990 by the then Deputy Minister of Culture, Youth and Sports, Selamat bin Munap.
