= Muara Library =

Library in Brunei-Muara, Brunei

- Perpustakaan Muara; Perpustakaan Dewan Bahasa dan Pustaka Muara
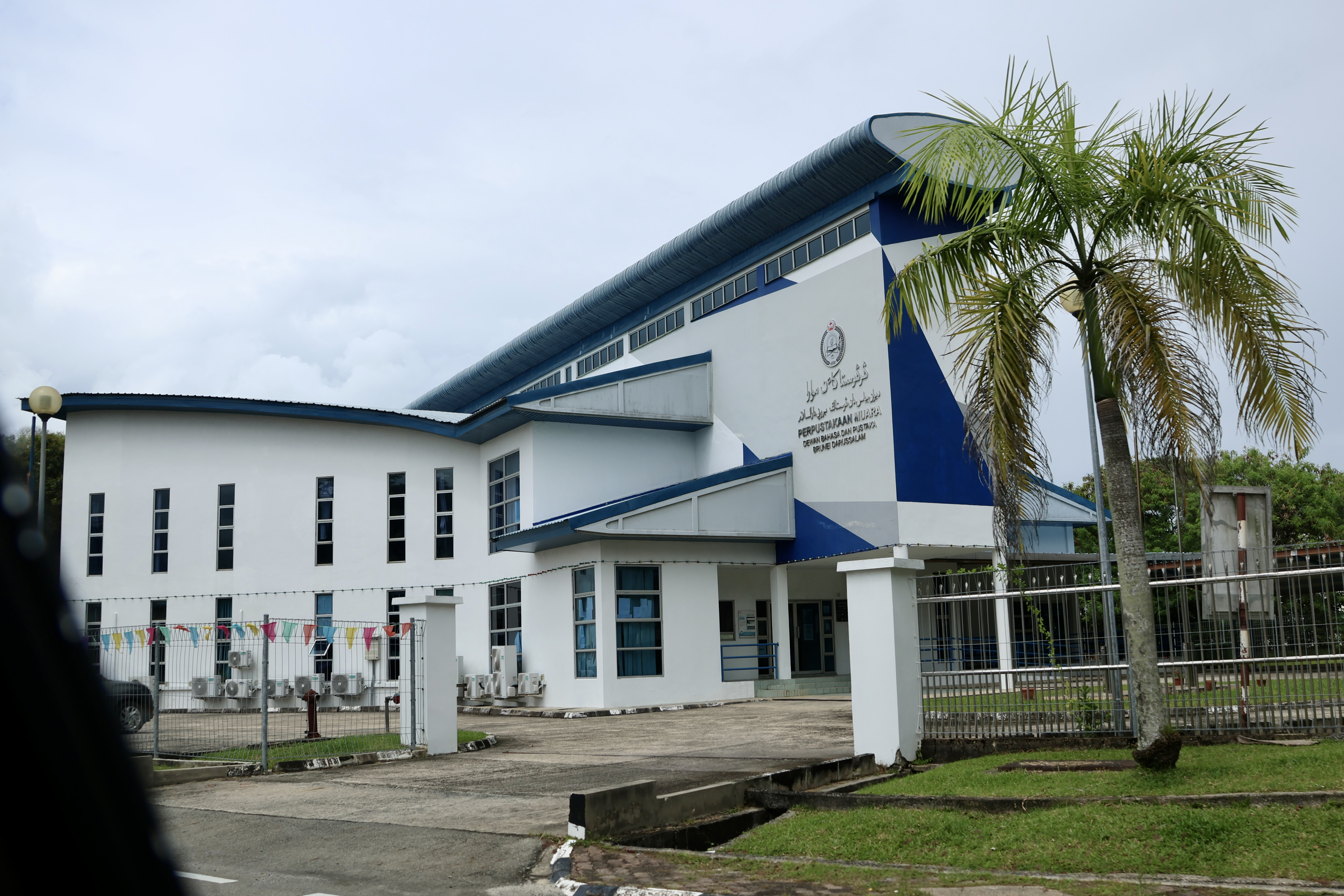
- The library in 2024
- 5°01′42.1″N 115°03′59.0″E
- Location: Muara, Brunei-Muara, Brunei
- Type: Public library
- Established: 8 December 2005
- Branch of: Dewan Bahasa dan Pustaka Library

Muara Library (Malay: Perpustakaan Muara) is a public library located in Muara in Brunei-Muara District, Brunei. Officially known in Malay as Perpustakaan Dewan Bahasa dan Pustaka Muara, it is one of the public libraries operated by Dewan Bahasa dan Pustaka Brunei.

== History ==
The laying of foundation stone for the library building was held in a ceremony on 13 May 2004, which was officiated by the then Minister of Culture, Youth and Sports, Awang Hussain bin Awang Mohd. Yusof. Its construction was completed by the following year, and the library was inaugurated on 8 December 2005 by the succeeding Minister, Awang Mohammad bin Daud.

== Facilities and Layout ==
The library features multi-generational, open-access spaces structured around various community needs:

- Quiet Reading Area: A designated space with study tables and seating meant for silent reading, typing, and individual academic work.
- Newspaper & Periodicals Section: A casual lounge setting offering public display racks of national daily print media, including the English-language Borneo Bulletin and the Malay-language Media Permata. No library registration or membership is required to read these materials on-site.
- Television Lounge: A communal seating area equipped with a television broadcasting local public programs and state networks via Radio Televisyen Brunei (RTB).
- Multimedia Room: An IT suite providing networked computer workstations (e-Zone) for registered library members to use for digital research, word processing, and general internet browsing.
- Children's Section: A vibrant, separated area featuring a collection of children's literature, and hosting space for local school holiday activities, coloring competitions, and storytelling sessions.

== Membership and Borrowing ==
While visiting the library to read or study is completely free and open to the public without registration, checking out physical materials requires a library membership. Registered members are permitted to borrow a maximum of 10 books at a time for a standard duration of two weeks. Membership registration is free of charge for citizens of Brunei upon presenting a valid National Registration Identity Card (IC).

== Community Usage ==
Due to its location right down the road from the Muara Health Centre (Klinik Kesihatan Muara) and immediately adjacent to the local post office, the library serves a unique social function for the local community. It is situated within a short 3-minute walk or a 1-minute drive from the healthcare facility. Because of this central, close proximity, family members, caretakers, and drivers frequently use the library's ground floor spaces to relax, access the free Wi-Fi, watch local TV, or read the daily newspapers while comfortably passing the time for family members undergoing medical check-ups or waiting for clinic queues.

While visitors can unwind in the library's quiet atmosphere, food and drinks are strictly prohibited inside the public reading rooms to protect the collection. However, family members waiting for extended periods are permitted to eat and have their meals outside the building on the provided benches, or they can visit the various local food stalls and eateries located just a short walk down the main street.
