= Language and Literature Bureau =

Language authority and public libraries operator in Brunei

Coordinates: 4°55′22″N 114°55′37″E

- Dewan Bahasa dan Pustaka ديوان بهاس دان ڤوستاک
- Logo of Language and Literature Bureau

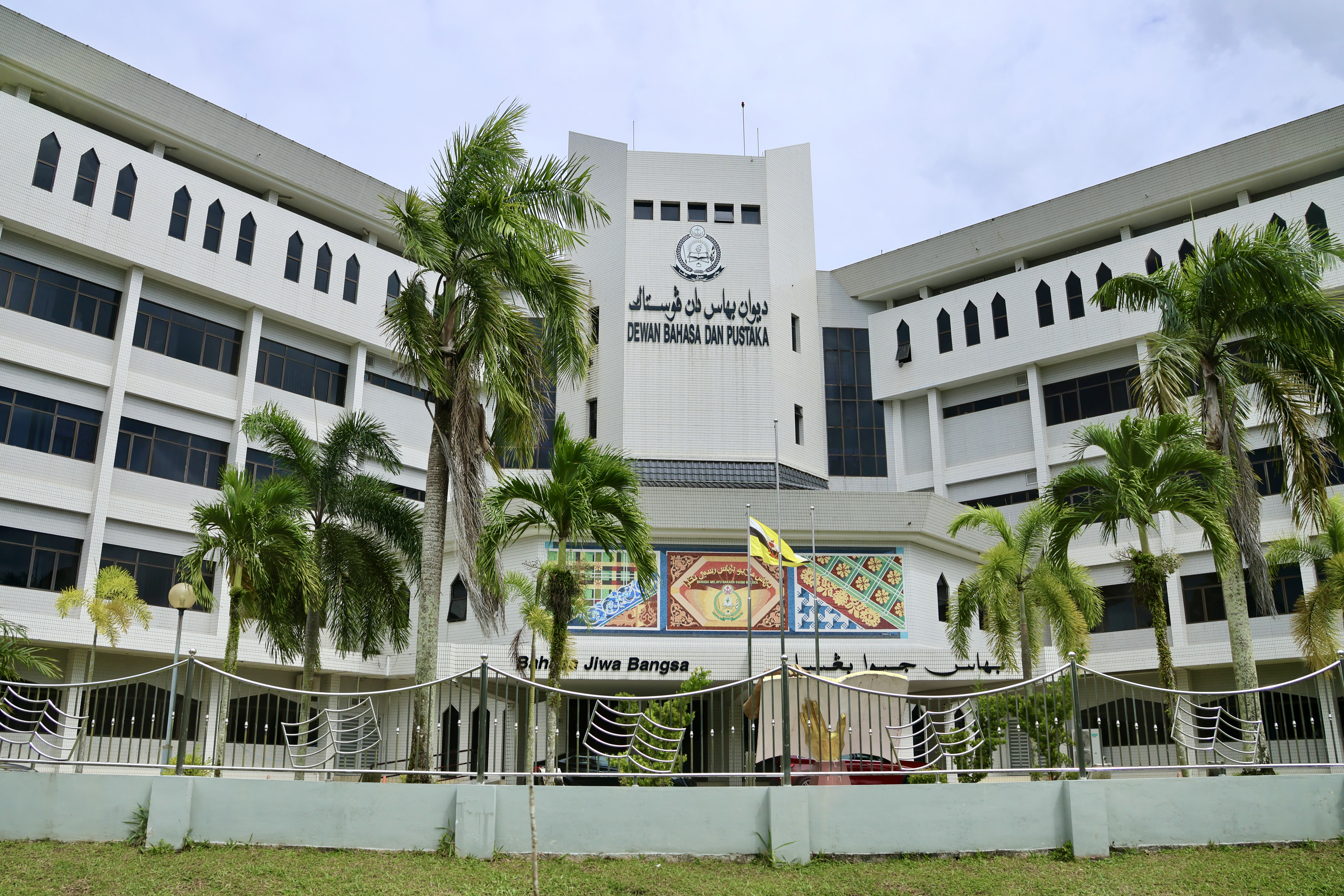
- Headquarters in Bandar Seri Begawan

Agency overview
- Formed: 19 April 1960; 66 years ago
- Jurisdiction: Government of Brunei
- Headquarters: Jalan Pembangunan, Lapangan Terbang Lama, Berakas BB3510, Brunei
- Motto: بهاس جيوا بڠسا; Bahasa Jiwa Bangsa (The Language is the Soul of the Nation)
- Minister responsible: Nazmi Mohamad, Minister of Culture, Youth and Sports
- Agency executive: Suip Abdul Wahab, Director
- Parent department: Ministry of Culture, Youth and Sports
- Website: www.dbp.gov.bn

The Language and Literature Bureau (Malay: Dewan Bahasa dan Pustaka, DBP) is the Bruneian language authority of the country's official language Malay. It is also the operator of public libraries in the country. It was established in 1960 and is now a government department under the Ministry of Culture, Youth and Sports.

== History ==
The establishment of the Lembaga Bahasa (Language Board) began with the approval of an usul (motion) during a Legislative Council meeting on 18 April 1960. The motion was to establish an independent body answerable to the government with the function of consolidating the status of Malay as the official language of Brunei, as enacted in the Constitution (Perlembagaan) which was promulgated in the previous year. However, it was later renamed to Bahagian Bahasa dan Pustaka (Language and Literature Section) in 1962. At the time it was established under the authority of Jabatan Pelajaran (Department of Education). On 1 January 1965, it was made into a separate department and eventually adopted the name Dewan Bahasa dan Pustaka (Language and Literature Bureau). In 1984, the agency was subsumed under the authority of the Ministry of Culture, Youth and Sports.

== Dictionary and other publications ==
Dewan Bahasa dan Pustaka Brunei publishes Kamus Bahasa Melayu Brunei, the official dictionary of the Brunei Malay language, the de facto lingua franca in Brunei. The dictionary was first published in 1991 and it is currently in its second edition, with entries over 15,000.

The Dewan also publishes four journals, namely Bahasa, Beriga, Pangsura and Undang-Undang Syariah, as well as three magazines, namely Bahana, Juara Pelajar and Mekar.

== Public libraries ==
Dewan Bahasa dan Pustaka Brunei operates all public libraries in the country, which include:

- Dewan Bahasa dan Pustaka Library
- Sengkurong Library
- Muara Library
- Lambak Kanan Library
- Tutong District Library
- Kuala Belait Library
- Kampong Pandan Library
- Seria Library
- Temburong District Library

Since 1970, it also has introduced mobile library services, locally known as Perpustakaan Bergerak.
