= Brunei–Myanmar relations =

- Brunei: Myanmar

Brunei and Myanmar established diplomatic relations in 1993. Brunei has an embassy in Yangon, and Myanmar has an embassy in Gadong. Both countries share friendly bilateral co-operation in education, health and labour.

== History ==
Relations between the two countries has been established since 21 September 1993. The relations are friendly and both countries are working on the health and education sectors as well to establish a bilateral trade and signed a double taxation avoidance agreement. In 1998, Brunei Sultan Hassanal Bolkiah has paid a visit to Myanmar. Since that, the ministries and personnel from both nations have maintained a long-term relationship and exchanges. Many Burmese academicians, intellectuals and intelligentsia, medics, nurses and workers also contributed to the development of Brunei. Brunei also support Myanmar for the ASEAN chairmanship in 2015 by training Burmese officials for the role.

== Economic relations ==
In economic relations, the Brunei National Petroleum Company (BNP) is one of the firms qualified to embark on the exploration of oil and gas onshore at a block in Myanmar. Both countries also focused on health education and technical assistance as well co-operating in capacity building and human resource development.
