= Brunei–Germany relations =

- Brunei: Germany

Diplomatic mission
- Embassy: Embassy

Envoy
- Ambassador Pengiran Krtini: Ambassador Gerda Winkler

Brunei and Germany established diplomatic relations in 1984. Brunei has an embassy in Berlin, and Germany has an embassy in Bandar Seri Begawan.

== History ==
Relations between the two countries has been established since 1 May 1984. In 1985, Sultan Hassanal Bolkiah undertook his first private visit to Germany and in 1998 made a state visit while an official visit was made in 2002 and 2011. German Chancellor Helmut Kohl paid an official visit to Brunei in 1997. In February 2026, German Foreign Minister Johann Wadephul visited Brunei, along with Australia, New Zealand, Singapore and Tonga, as part of a diplomatic tour of the Western Pacific area.

== Economic relations ==
Brunei views Germany as an important economic partner with bilateral trade increased in 2011 to approximately €346 million. Germany exports to Brunei are mainly in cars, machinery, chemicals and heavy equipment. There is also a ratification of an agreement on the encouragement and reciprocal protection of investment between both countries.

== Education relations ==
There is also a student exchange program between Brunei and Germany which was initiated in 2008 when a group of Bruneian students went to German universities to study.

== See also ==
- Foreign relations of Brunei
- Foreign relations of Germany
