= Commissioner of Police (Brunei) =

Top-ranking police officer of the Royal Brunei Police Force

- Pesuruhjaya Polis Diraja Brunei ڤسوروحجاي ڤوليس دراج بروني
- Emblem of the Royal Brunei Police Force

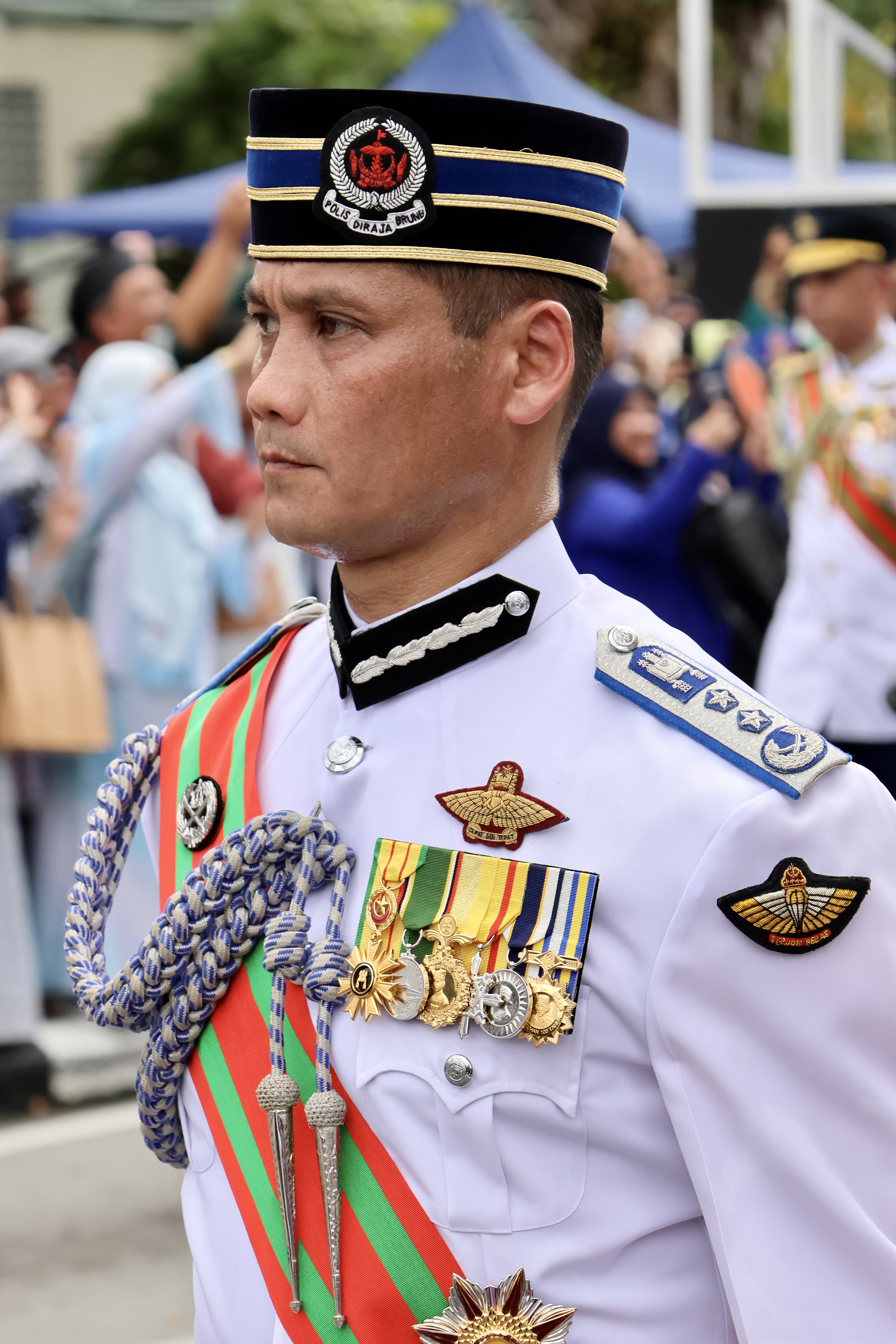
- Incumbent; Sulaiman Alidin since 19 June 2025
- Royal Brunei Police Force
- Style: Yang Mulia
- Type: Commissioner of Police
- Member of: Adat Istiadat Council
- Reports to: Minister of Home Affairs
- Seat: Royal Brunei Police Force Headquarters, Bandar Seri Begawan, Brunei
- Appointer: Hassanal Bolkiah; as Sultan of Brunei
- Term length: At His Majesty's pleasure
- Constituting instrument: Constitution of Brunei
- Inaugural holder: Allen Neil Outram
- Formation: 29 September 1959
- Deputy: Deputy Commissioner

The Commissioner of Police (Malay: Pesuruhjaya Polis Diraja Brunei; Jawi: ڤسوروحجاي ڤوليس دراج بروني), established in 1959, leads the Royal Brunei Police Force (RBPF) under the Sultan of Brunei's authority, delegating duties as needed and ensuring compliance with laws and regulations across ranks. The role includes managing appointments, promotions, and disciplinary actions, with the power to impose sanctions and handle appeals. Additionally, the commissioner oversees unclaimed property at police stations, either returning it to owners or allocating it to police funds if unclaimed. Through these responsibilities, the commissioner maintains order, accountability, and effective administration within the force.

== History ==
=== 1909–1959 ===
H.G. Crummy was the Brunei Police Force's (PPB) first chief police officer (CPO), having assumed the position in 1909. His appointment signalled the start of the state's British-led policing initiatives, which brought in foreign experts to maintain peace and order. Other British officers held the CPO post in the next years, and under their direction, the administrative framework of the police force progressively changed. In addition to maintaining peace and order, the CPO's duties at this time included building Brunei's police force and educating new recruits. However, long into the middle of the 20th century, there was still a reliance on British commanders due to a lack of suitable local candidates.

The Straits Settlements Police Force was no longer directly in charge of the PPB, which became a completely separate entity between 1921 and 1941. This change came when the Brunei State Assembly passed the 1920 Police Force Enactment, which established the framework for a distinct police force and went into operation in 1921. Due to a lack of competent local officers for these roles, Brunei's police force remained to rely on CPOs and trained instructors imported from the Straits Settlements despite the country's formal independence.

The leadership and organisational makeup of the PPB underwent substantial changes between 1942 and 1945 when Japan occupied the country. Local British officials, including Chief Inspector W. Martin, were arrested and jailed when Japanese Army soldiers took over the police. Sergeant Major Ibrahim bin Nudin served as the force's interim commander until Japanese officers could arrive. The police force was eventually commanded by Japanese officials including Watakerbey, Ochey Sang, and Eto Sang. Under their direction, they instilled aspects of Japanese culture and placed a strong emphasis on discipline and loyalty within the PPB.

On 6 July 1946, the British Army handed back administrative authority to the British Resident in Brunei after World War II, returning the structure of the Brunei Police Force to its pre-war state. The Straits Settlements Police Force's Assistant Superintendent H. J. Spinks was named CPO and served as the PPB's commander from 1946 to 1949. As early as 1949, senior Sarawakian police officers were joining the PPB, and their wages were matched by the Bruneian government. To give time for financial and administrative planning, this move was made gradually.

=== 1959–present ===
The PPB underwent major institutional changes on 29 September 1959, when the Brunei Constitution was adopted. The new constitution created the post of police commissioner as the head of the PPB, which was formerly headed by a CPO from the Sarawak Constabulary. The Bruneian and British governments had larger defense arrangements that included this development.

Officers from the Sarawak Constabulary occupied the position from 1959 to 1975, during which time they made important improvements. Alexander John Waterfield Slater arranged responsibilities at the District Police level in 1964, while Commissioner Allen Neil Outram created a Reserve Police Force in 1961. The PPB grew, adopted contemporary training, and elevated locals to top positions under Commissioner James Burns from 1966 to 1975. During his tenure, the Marine Police Force and Women's Police were established, the Police Training Centre opened in 1968, and communication networks were improved. When Pengiran Jaya was appointed the first Bruneian police commissioner in 1975, it was a historic milestone.

In the past, Brunei's police commissioners have been crucial in helping the PPB adjust to shifting political, social, and economic circumstances. In order to improve officer welfare, efficiency, and public service, each Commissioner carried out a number of measures. A Public Relations Department was established in 1988, a Village Neighborhood Watch project was started in 1989, and PEKERTI was founded in 1985 to develop police family relations under Pengiran Umar. In order to better management, Commissioner Abdul Rahman Besar reorganised the PPB's administration by establishing directorates and expanding police command zones.

In order to facilitate information exchange across ASEAN police forces, Subsequent Commissioner Ya'akub Zainal introduced technology advancements for the force, including the ASEANAPOL Database, LATIS, and Police On-Line. His leadership placed a strong emphasis on providing accurate, rapid service, and he established a section to look into crimes affecting women and children. Ya'akub was replaced in 2001 by Abdul Rahman Johan, who redesigned the police uniform to represent national identification and improved criminal investigations by using the automated fingerprint identification system. In order to bring the RBPF into line with its objectives of providing high levels of public service, police commissioners have been essential change agents through these efforts.

== Functions ==
Under the Royal Brunei Police Force Act, the Commissioner is responsible for commanding, directing, and administering the police force, following the orders of the Sultan of Brunei. The Commissioner can delegate responsibilities to deputy commissioners or senior officers, who act on the Commissioner's behalf when necessary. Additionally, the Commissioner oversees police officers across districts, ensuring compliance with regulations and laws. The Commissioner manages the appointment, promotion, and discipline of senior officers, inspectors, and subordinate staff. This includes authorising appointments, suspensions, discharges, and issuing warrant cards as proof of appointment. Officers must meet service requirements, including medical exams, before starting duty, and return government-issued property upon resignation or discharge.

In disciplinary matters, the Commissioner or an authorised officer can punish subordinate officers for offences such as absence without leave, insubordination, intoxication, or corrupt practices. Punishments include dismissal, demotion, fines, and other sanctions. For inspectors, the Commissioner can impose stricter penalties. Officers can appeal disciplinary decisions to the Commissioner or the Sultan, depending on rank and severity. Additionally, officers may be prosecuted in court for certain offences, and the Commissioner can convene a Committee of Enquiry to investigate incidents like injury, death, or property damage. The Commissioner also handles lost or unclaimed property deposited at police stations. If claimed within three months and verified, the property is returned to the rightful owner after covering expenses and a reward for the finder. If unclaimed, the property can be sold, with proceeds allocated to the Police Fund or the Consolidated Fund, depending on the amount. The Commissioner may dispose of items with negligible value and is also responsible for notifying the Probate Officer and safeguarding unclaimed property from deceased individuals until further instructions.

== List of CPOs ==
Symbols

Acting police chiefs

No.	Name	Took office	Left office	Time in office	Monarch	Ref
Straits Settlements Police Force (1909–1941)
1	H. G. Crummey	1909	1917	7–8 years	Muhammad Jamalul Alam II	
2	G. C. McAfee	1917	1920	2–3 years	Muhammad Jamalul Alam II	
3	Farmer	1920	1920	less than a year	Muhammad Jamalul Alam II	
4	F. Mann	1920	1921	0–1 years	Muhammad Jamalul Alam II	
(2)	G. C. McAfee	1921	1925	3–4 years	Muhammad Jamalul Alam II	
5	A. V. Cockle	1 February 1925	15 October 1925	256 days	Ahmad Tajuddin	
(2)	G. C. McAfee	1926	1928	1–2 years	Ahmad Tajuddin	
6	T. E. Murphy	1928	1931	2–3 years	Ahmad Tajuddin	
7	H. J. Spinks	1931	1932	0–1 years	Ahmad Tajuddin	
(6)	T. E. Murphy	1932	1934	1–2 years	Ahmad Tajuddin	
8	T. F. Brown	1934	1935	0–1 years	Ahmad Tajuddin	
(6)	T. E. Murphy	1935	1937	1–2 years	Ahmad Tajuddin	
(8)	T. F. Brown	1937	1938	0–1 years	Ahmad Tajuddin	
9	W. Dawson	1938	1940	1–2 years	Ahmad Tajuddin	
10	W. Martin	1940	1941	0–1 years	Ahmad Tajuddin	
Malayan Police Force (1946–1949)
1	H. J. Spinks	1946	1949	2–3 years	Ahmad Tajuddin	
2	T. H. Allen	1948	1948	less than a year	Ahmad Tajuddin	
Sarawak Constabulary (1950–1959)
1	W. Philips	1950	1950	less than a year	Omar Ali Saifuddien III	
2	P. E. Turnbill	1950	1953	2–3 years	Omar Ali Saifuddien III	
3	A. C. Eattel	1953	1954	0–1 years	Omar Ali Saifuddien III	
–	T. F. Stone	1954	1955	0–1 years	Omar Ali Saifuddien III	
4	J. C. C. Kirby-Turner	1955	1956	0–1 years	Omar Ali Saifuddien III	
6	Allen Neil Outram	1956	1957	0–1 years	Omar Ali Saifuddien III	
7	T. S. Anderson	1957	1958	0–1 years	Omar Ali Saifuddien III	
9	K. S. Leston-Smith	1959	1959	less than a year	Omar Ali Saifuddien III	

== List of commissioners ==
Symbols

Acting police commissioners

No.	Portrait	Name	Took office	Left office	Time in office	Monarch	Ref
–		K. S. Leston-Smith	1959	1959	less than a year	Omar Ali Saifuddien III	
1		Dato Seri Pahlawan; Allen Neil Outram (1917–2004)	1959	1963	3–4 years	Omar Ali Saifuddien III	
2		Dato Setia; Alexander Slater (1916–2002); Acting from 1963	1963	12 August 1966	2–3 years	Omar Ali Saifuddien III	
3		Pehin Datu Pahlawan Diraja; Dato Seri Pahlawan; James Burns (1916–2002)	12 August 1966	1975	8–9 years	Omar Ali Saifuddien III	
4		Pengiran Setia Raja; Pengiran Jaya ڤڠيرن جاي (1925–2009)	1975	1983	7–8 years	Hassanal Bolkiah	
5		Pengiran Putera Negara; Pengiran Umar ڤڠيرن عمر (1940–2023)	1984	1991	6–7 years	Hassanal Bolkiah	
6		Dato Paduka Seri; Abdul Rahman Besar عبدالرحمن جوهن	1991	1997	5–6 years	Hassanal Bolkiah	
7		Pehin Orang Kaya Maharaja Kerna; Dato Paduka Seri; Ya'akub Zainal عبدالرحمن جوهن (b.1941)	11 March 1997	9 April 2001	3 years, 152 days	Hassanal Bolkiah	
8		Dato Paduka Seri; Abdul Rahman Johan عبدالرحمن جوهن (b.1923); Acting from 9 April 2001	1 September 2001	1 February 2005	3 years, 153 days	Hassanal Bolkiah	
9		Pehin Datu Kerma Setia; Dato Paduka Seri; Zainuddin Jalani زاينوددين جالني; Acting from 1 February 2005	1 July 2005	30 August 2010	5 years, 60 days	Hassanal Bolkiah	
10		Pehin Orang Kaya Pendikar Alam; Dato Paduka Seri; Hasrin Sabtu هسرين سبتو (b.1954); Acting from 30 August 2010	25 February 2011	4 August 2013	2 years, 160 days	Hassanal Bolkiah	
11		Dato Paduka Seri; Bahrin Noor بهرين نور; Acting from 4 August 2013	23 August 2013	29 May 2016	2 years, 280 days	Hassanal Bolkiah	
12		Dato Paduka Seri; Jammy Shah Al-Islam جم شاه الإسلام	29 May 2016	23 June 2019	3 years, 25 days	Hassanal Bolkiah	
13		Dato Paduka Seri; Irwan Hambali ايرون همبالي	23 June 2019	15 June 2025	5 years, 357 days	Hassanal Bolkiah	
14		Dato Seri Pahlawan; Sulaiman Alidin سليمان عليدين Acting from 15 June 2025	19 June 2025	Incumbent	1 year, 133 days	Hassanal Bolkiah	
