= Pengiran Jaya =

Bruneian police commissioner (1925–2009)

Yang Amat Mulia Pengiran Setia Raja Pengiran Jaya DK DHPNB PHBS QPM CPM PJK
- ڤڠيرن جاي
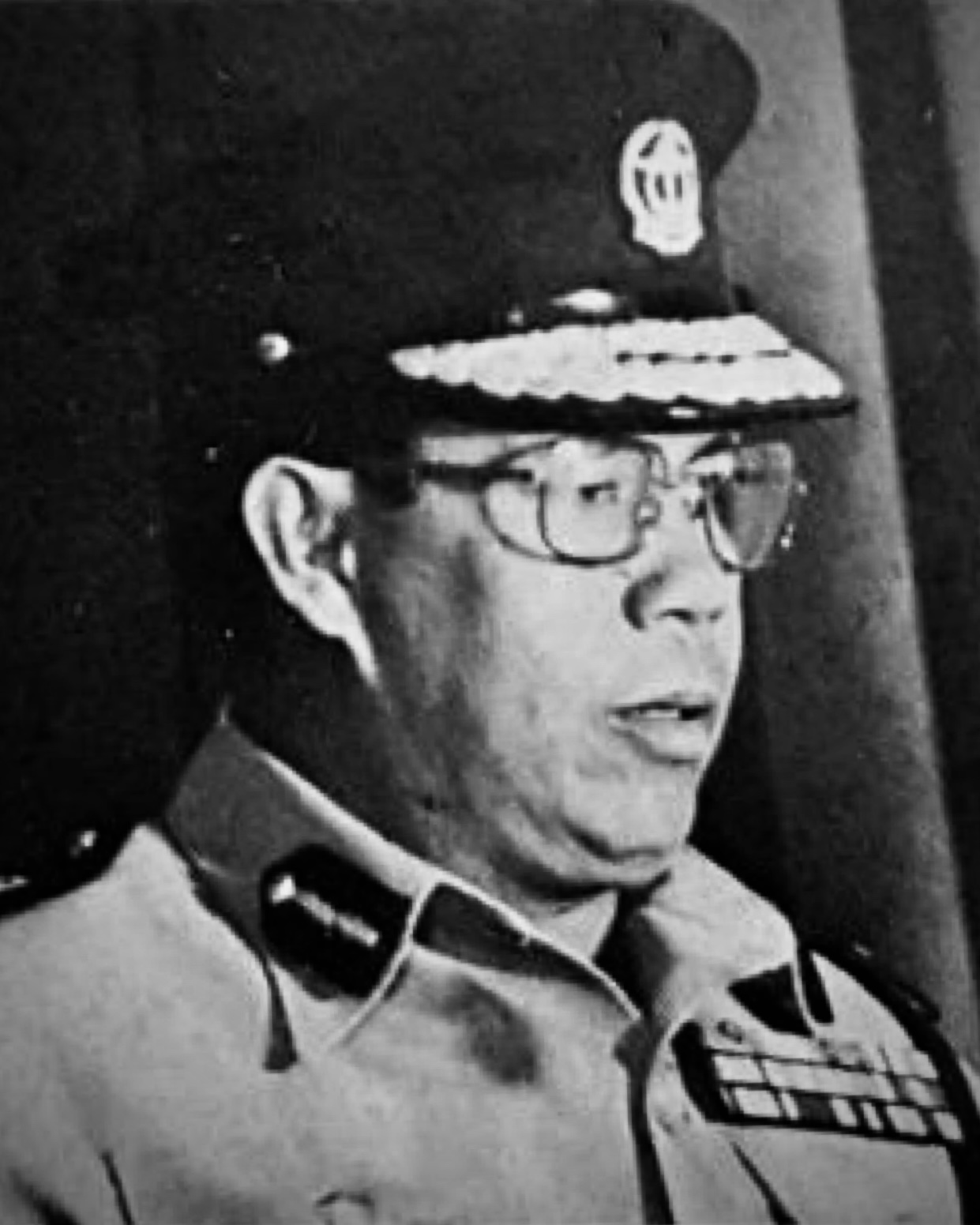
- Pengiran Jaya in 1972

High Commissioner of Brunei to Malaysia
- In office 1993–1995
- Preceded by: Pengiran Abdul Momin
- Succeeded by: Pengiran Muhammad Yusuf

Ambassador of Brunei to Thailand
- In office 30 October 1990 – 1993
- Preceded by: Hamid Jaafar
- Succeeded by: Yunos Hussein

High Commissioner of Brunei to the United Kingdom
- In office 14 March 1984 – October 1990
- Succeeded by: Pengiran Mustafa

Commissioner of Police
- In office 1975–1983
- Monarch: Hassanal Bolkiah
- Deputy: Pengiran Umar
- Preceded by: James Burns
- Succeeded by: Pengiran Umar

Personal details
- Born: 1925 Brunei
- Died: 18 October 2009 (aged 83) Raja Isteri Pengiran Anak Saleha Hospital, Bandar Seri Begawan, Brunei
- Resting place: Royal Mausoleum, Bandar Seri Begawan, Brunei
- Relatives: Pengiran Mokhtar Puteh (brother); Pengiran Mohammed (uncle)
- Education: Scottish Police College
- Police career
- Country: Brunei
- Department: Royal Brunei Police Force
- Service years: 1945–1983
- Rank: Commissioner

Pengiran Jaya bin Pengiran Haji Rajid (Note: The former spelling of his patronymic name was "Pengiran Abdul Rajid" rather than "Pengiran Rajid.") (1925 – 18 October 2009) was a Bruneian diplomat and noble police officer who served as the first bumiputera (local) commissioner of the Royal Brunei Police Force (RBPF) from 197 to 1991.

== Police career ==
Pengiran Jaya bin Pengiran Haji Rajid was born in Brunei in 1925 and began his service in the police force on 24 September 1945. In 1955, he attended a six-month training course for junior police officers in London. The following year, on 1 September, he was promoted to assistant superintendent.

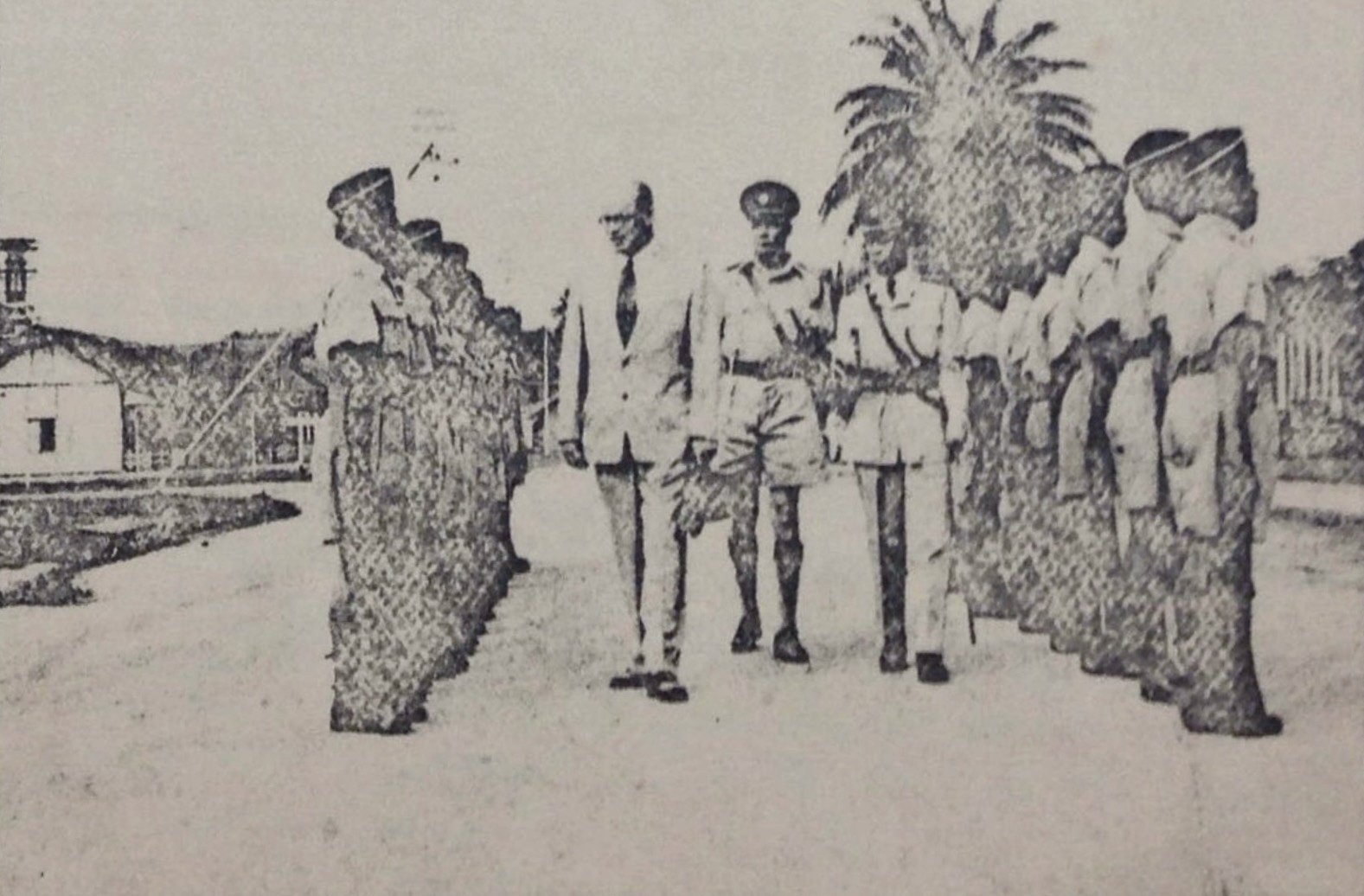
From left to right: Sir Anthony Abell, Allen Neil Outram, and Pengiran Jaya, inspecting the honour guard in 1956

As the officer in charge of the Brunei District Police, he accompanied Sir Anthony Abell during the inspection of the Brunei Town Police's honour guard on 14 November 1956, ahead of the high commissioner's visit to the British Resident's Office. In 1957, during the official opening of Brunei Airport and its new terminal building, Pengiran Jaya, then an inspector, led the police honour guard. This event marked the first time the force appeared in their new uniforms of black pants and white shirts, and it was attended by Sultan Omar Ali Saifuddien III, British Resident John Orman Gilbert, and Abell. Additionally, Pengiran Jaya played a key role in welcoming Prince Philip, Duke of Edinburgh, during his 1959 visit to Brunei, leading the police band and the Royal Brunei Police honour guard.

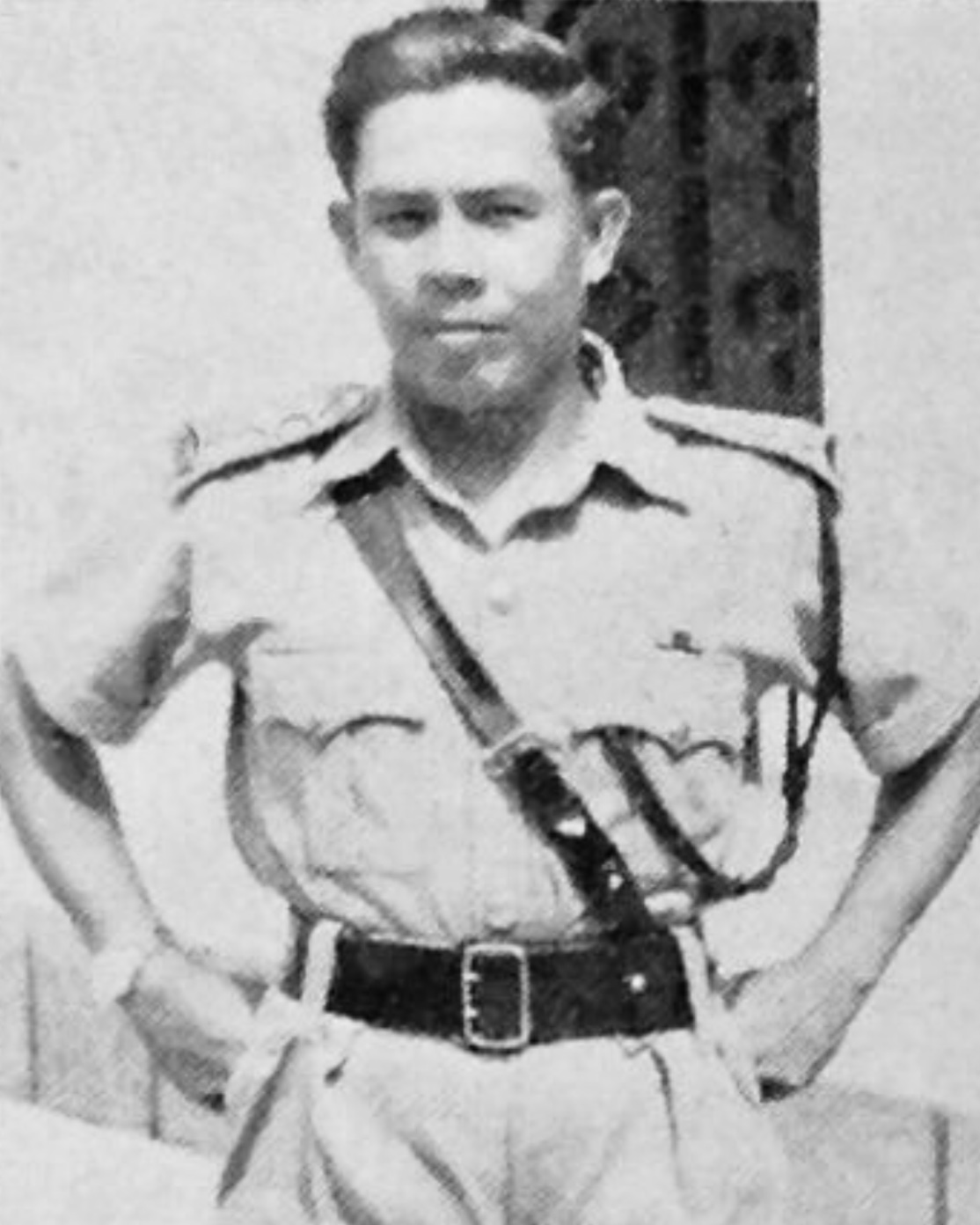
Pengiran Jaya, c. 1961

In January 1961, Pengiran Jaya was promoted to superintendent. To further his career, he left for Scotland on 27 September to attend a senior police officer training course at the Tulliallan Castle Police College near Edinburgh. After completing the nearly three-month course at the Scottish Police College in Kincardine-on-Forth, he returned to Brunei on 25 December. The course featured participants from various countries, with him being the youngest and the only Malay attendee. During his stay in the United Kingdom, he met several Brunei students and had the opportunity to meet Allen Neil Outram, the police commissioner of Brunei, who was on holiday there. Additionally, Pengiran Jaya presented a police shield to Sidney Anderson Kinnear.

On 16 February 1963, Pengiran Jaya accompanied the acting sultan, Pengiran Anak Mohamed Alam, and other senior officials during their visit to Bangar. The visit aimed to strengthen cooperation with the government and reassure the public by offering rewards for information on certain criminal activities. In 1964, he was part of a delegation of three Bruneian government officials who traveled to Singapore and Kuala Lumpur. The purpose of the trip was to observe the identity card registration procedures, including visits to immigration offices in both cities and the main identity card registrar's office in Petaling Jaya. This visit was part of the preparations for the anticipated introduction of the identity card system in Brunei. Later that year, on 22 November, he traveled to London carrying two bags filled with 50 pounds of confidential documents, as part of the delegation accompanying the sultan for talks on constitutional reforms. In December 1969, Pengiran Jaya issued a public warning against the use of fireworks during Hari Raya, Christmas, and Chinese New Year, reminding citizens that the importation and sale of fireworks were illegal and offenders could face prosecution under Brunei's emergency laws.

As the first local Bruneian to serve as Commissioner of Police in 1975, Pengiran Jaya's leadership marked a significant milestone for the Brunei Police Force. This transition was a major shift, as the Commissioner is responsible for steering and planning the force's development. Under his command, Pengiran Jaya focused on strengthening the administration and ensuring that the police force was efficient and adaptable to changes in the environment. He was committed to establishing a professional and competent force, dedicated to serving the interests of both the people and the state of Brunei. His leadership was crucial in addressing various challenges, enhancing public safety, and improving the overall administration and effectiveness of the police force. In early January 1977, the Royal Brunei Marine Police launched a new 36-foot (11 m) fast patrol boat, "PDB Sejahtera," in a ceremony held in Muara, where Pengiran Jaya, along with senior police officers and their families, attended. After serving for many years, he retired from the police force in 1983, with Pengiran Umar succeeding him.

== Later life and death ==
After retiring from his police career, Pengiran Jaya became a member of both the Privy Council and the Royal Succession Council. He later embarked on a diplomatic career, serving as high commissioner and ambassador to several countries. His first posting was to the United Kingdom from 14 March 1984 to October 1990, during which he also held dual accreditation to Belgium, France, Germany, Ireland, and the European states. He was then reappointed as ambassador to Thailand from October 1990 to 1993, with additional accreditation to Bangladesh, Sri Lanka, Cambodia, and Nepal. His final diplomatic assignment was in Malaysia, where he served from 1993 to 1995.

Pengiran Jaya died at the age of 83 at Raja Isteri Pengiran Anak Saleha Hospital on 18 October 2009, at 5:45 am. His funeral was attended by Sultan Hassanal Bolkiah and Crown Prince Al-Muhtadee Billah, who joined the congregational funeral prayer led by Abdul Aziz Juned at his residence in Kampong Sungai Tilong. His body is buried at the Royal Mausoleum in Bandar Seri Begawan.

== Personal life ==
Pengiran Jaya was married and had eight children. He also had a brother, Pengiran Mokhtar Puteh, who also served as a member of the Privy Council.

== Titles, styles and honours ==
=== Titles and styles ===
Personal standard of Pengiran Setia Raja

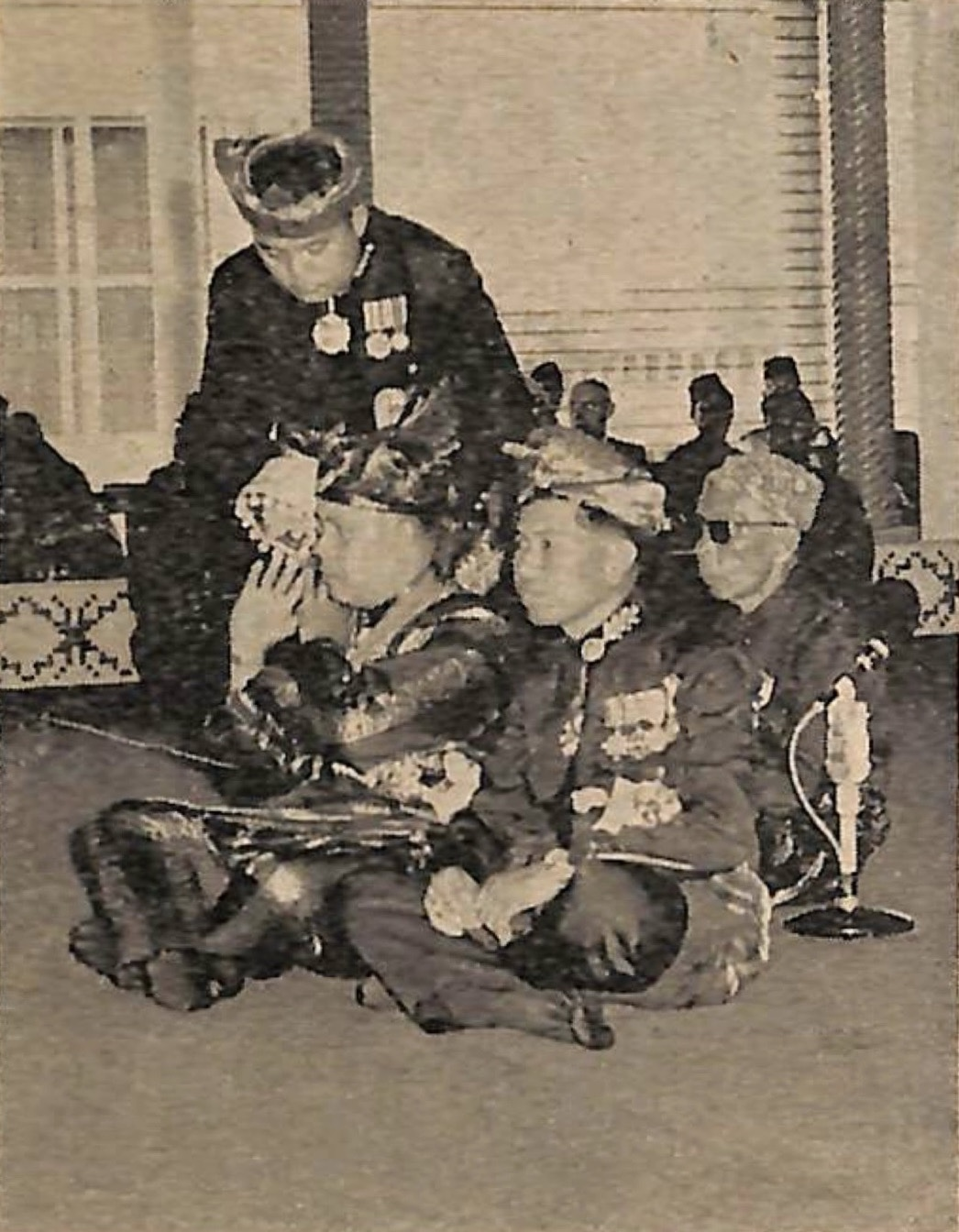
Pengiran Jaya (seated first from the left) receiving the title at the Lapau on 14 March 1969

On 14 March 1969, Pengiran Jaya was honoured by Sultan Hassanal Bolkiah with the cheteria title of Pengiran Setia Raja, bearing the style Yang Amat Mulia.

=== Honours ===
Pengiran Jaya has been bestowed the following honours:

- Family Order of Laila Utama (DK) – Dato Laila Utama
- Family Order of Seri Utama (DK; 2 August 1967) – Dato Seri Utama
- Order of Setia Negara Brunei Second Class (DSNB; 1963) – Dato Setia
- Order of Pahlawan Negara Brunei Second Class (DHPNB; 23 September 1963) – Dato Hamzah Pahlawan
- Sultan Hassanal Bolkiah Medal First Class (PHBS; 1968)
- Coronation Medal (1 August 1968)
- Meritorious Service Medal (PJK)
- Brunei Police Medal (Long Service) (1963)
- Royal Police Medal 1965
- Campaign Medal

Foreign

- United Kingdom:
  - Queen's Police Medal (QPM; 1966)
  - Colonial Police Medal (CPM; 1961)

== Notes ==
Diplomatic posts
Preceded by –	High Commissioner of Brunei to the United Kingdom; 14 March 1984 – 1990	Succeeded by Pengiran Mustafa
Preceded by Hamid Jaafar	Ambassador of Brunei to Thailand; 30 October 1990 – 1993	Succeeded by Yunos Hussein
Preceded by Pengiran Abdul Momin	High Commissioner of Brunei to Malaysia; 1993–1995	Succeeded by Pengiran Muhammad Yusuf
Police appointments
Preceded by James Burns	Commissioner of Police; 1975–1983	Succeeded by Pengiran Umar
