= James Richard Henry Burns =

English police officer (1916–2002)

Yang Dimuliakan Pehin Datu Pahlawan Diraja Dato Seri Pahlawan James Richard Henry Burns KPM CPM PSPNB DSNB DSLJ PHBS PJK CBE JMN
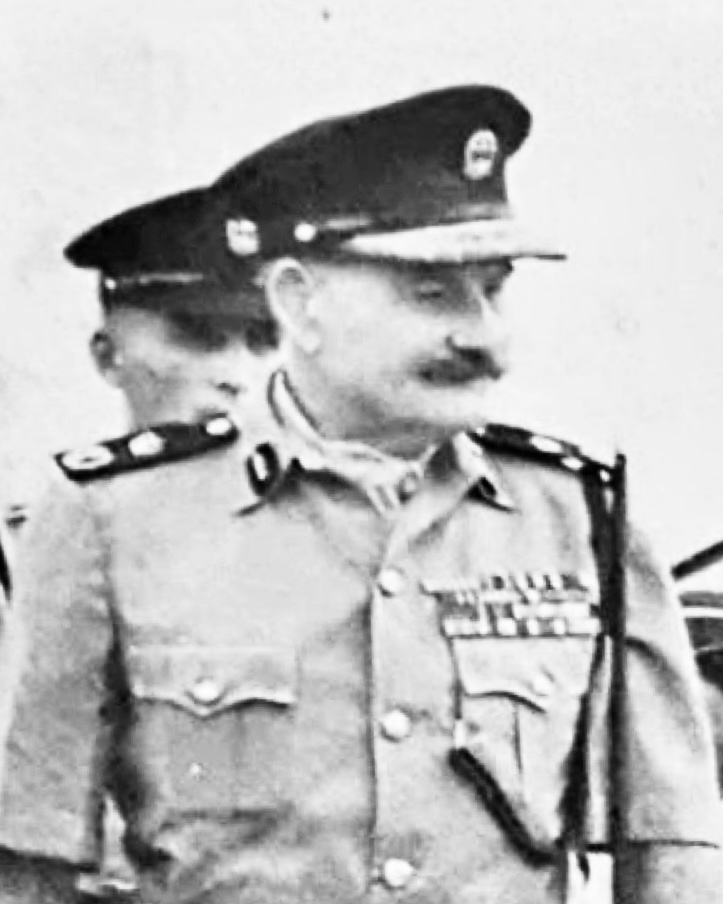
- Commissioner Burns in 1967

Commissioner of Police
- In office 12 August 1966 – 1975
- Monarchs: Omar Ali Saifuddien III; Hassanal Bolkiah
- Deputy: Pengiran Jaya
- Preceded by: Alexander Slater
- Succeeded by: Pengiran Jaya

Personal details
- Born: 31 December 1916 England, United Kingdom
- Died: 26 December 2002 (aged 85) United Kingdom
- Spouse: Rosamund Ward-Jackson
- Education: Eastbourne College
- Police career
- Country: Malaysia; Brunei
- Department: Royal Malaysia Police; Royal Brunei Police Force
- Service years: 1937–1966 (Malaysia); 1966–1975 (Brunei)
- Rank: Senior Assistant Commissioner (Malaysia); Commissioner (Brunei)

James Richard Henry Burns (31 December 1916 – 26 December 2002) or also referred to as J. R. H. Burns, was a British police officer from England who served in several high-ranking positions which included being a member of the Brunei Privy Council and Brunei Police Commissioner.

== Biography ==
Burns was born in England, on 31 December 1916. He was educated at Eastbourne College, and would go on to marry Rosamund (née Ward-Jackson). He commenced his tenure with the Federated Malay States Police in 1937, progressing through various ranks: Assistant Superintendent by 1940, Superintendent by 1950, Assistant Commissioner of Police for the Federation of Malaya by 1953, and finally, Senior Assistant Commissioner by 1957.

Burns served as an RBPF Commissioner from 12 August 1966 until 15 August 1975. During his tenure, he also became a member of the Privy Council. On 16 March 1967, he attended the graduation of 39 recruits at the police headquarters in Brunei Town. Later that year in August, he would visit the 150 recruits training at the Royal Malaysian Police training academy in Kuala Lumpur.

Burns died on 26 December 2002, in the United Kingdom.

== Titles, styles and honours ==
Burns was bestowed the Manteri title Yang Dimuliakan (The Exalted One) Pehin Datu Pahlawan Diraja on 19 April 1973. He also received other titles such as Dato Seri Pahlawan, and other awards of recognition during his lifetime service to the Brunei government. Additionally, he has been known to have the following honours:

National

- Commander of the Order of the British Empire (CBE; 1962)
- King's Police Medal (KPM; 1953)
- Colonial Police Medal (CPM; 1947)

Foreign

- Brunei:
  - Order of Pahlawan Negara Brunei First Class (PSPNB; 1971) – Dato Seri Pahlawan
  - Order of Setia Negara Brunei Second Class (DSNB) – Dato Setia
  - Sultan Hassanal Bolkiah Medal (PHBS)
  - Meritorious Service Medal (PJK)
- Malaysia:
  - Companion of the Order of the Defender of the Realm (JMN)
- Perak:
  - Meritorious Service Medal (PJK)

Police appointments
Preceded by Alexander Slater	Commissioner of Police	Succeeded by Pengiran Jaya
