= Ya'akub Zainal =

Bruneian police commissioner (born 1941)

Yang Dimuliakan Pehin Orang Kaya Maharaja Kerna Dato Paduka Seri Ya'akub Zainal DPKT DSLJ DUBC JMN PBLI PJK PIKB
- يعقوب زاءينل
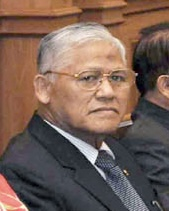
- Ya'akub in 2016

Member of the Legislative Council
- In office 1 June 2011 – 11 February 2015

Commissioner of Police
- In office 11 March 1997 – 9 April 2001
- Monarch: Hassanal Bolkiah
- Deputy: Abdul Rahman Johan
- Preceded by: Abdul Rahman Besar
- Succeeded by: Abdul Rahman Johan

Personal details
- Born: 5 July 1941 (age 85) Kampong Lurong Dalam, Brunei Town, Brunei
- Education: Sultan Omar Ali Saifuddien College
- Police career
- Country: Brunei
- Department: Royal Brunei Police Force
- Service years: 1962–2001
- Rank: Commissioner

Ya'akub bin Haji Zainal (born 5 July 1941) is a Bruneian aristocrat, politician and former police officer who served as the police commissioner of the Royal Brunei Police Force (RBPF) from 1997 to 2001, and member of Legislative Council (LegCo) from 2011 to 2015. Notably, he is the advisor of Retired Personnel of the Royal Brunei Police Force Association (POLSARA).

== Early life and education ==
On 5 July 1941, Ya'akub is born in the Bruneian village of Kampong Lurong Dalam of Kampong Ayer. He had his early education at Sultan Omar Ali Saifuddien College after attending Sultan Muhammad Jamalul Alam Malay School (SMJA) to grade 5. He first began work as a Clerk Grade 'B' in the Department of Studies in the government of Brunei on 9 March 1961.

== Police career ==
Ya'akub received approval to join the RBPF as a probationary inspector on 6 June 1962. Following his completion of basic training, he was posted to the Kuala Belait police station, specifically serving as the chief of police station's assistant. After serving in the police force for 39 years, he retired on 5 July 1996, with the title of deputy commissioner. On 11 March 1997, he returned to the service and served as police commissioner. He would officially be replaced on 9 April 2001, despite Abdul Rahman Johan was the acting police commissioner since 4 May 2000.

== Political career ==
Borneo Bulletin formally declared on 31 May 2011, that he will join the Legislative Council, effective 1 June. He traveled from Brunei as part of the delegation to the 20th Asia Pacific Parliamentary Forum (APPF) in Japan from 8 to 12 January 2012, and the ASEAN Inter-Parliamentary Assembly (AIPA) in September 2011.

Ya'akub proposed establishing halal product factories in Brunei during the 11th LegCo Meeting in March 2015, expecting government allocation of funds to ensure both national benefit and citizen welfare. He presented ideas and opinions on 18 March, regarding the creation of a national fund and the replacement of the current Brunei Museum with a new structure in Bandar Seri Begawan. On 23 March, he cited the migration of Kampong Ayer people to the mainland as a major element in the water village's decline. He noted a noticeable migration of locals in search of land for National Housing Scheme homes.

== Personal life ==
Ya'akub is the son of an aristocrat, Pehin Orang Kaya Maharaja Diraja Dato Paduka Haji Zainal.

== Honours ==
Ya'akub is bestowed the Manteri title of Yang Berhormat Pehin Orang Kaya Maharaja Kerna on 17 April 2004. He has earned the following honours:

=== National ===
- Order of Paduka Keberanian Laila Terbilang First Class (DPKT) – Dato Paduka Seri
- Order of Paduka Seri Laila Jasa Second Class (DSLJ) – Dato Seri Laila Jasa
- Pingat Bakti Laila Ikhlas (PBLI)
- Meritorious Service Medal (PJK)
- Excellent Service Medal (PIKB)
- Police Long Service Medal (PKLP)
- Sultan of Brunei Silver Jubilee Medal (5 October 1992)
- General Service Medal (Police)

=== Foreign ===
- Malaysia:
  - Companion of the Order of the Defender of the Realm (JMN)
- Singapore:
  - Darjah Utama Bakti Cemerlang (DUBC; 23 August 1999)

Police appointments
Preceded by Abdul Rahman Besar	Commissioner of Police	Succeeded by Abdul Rahman Johan
