= Hasrin Sabtu =

Bruneian police commissioner (born 1954)

Yang Dimuliakan Pehin Orang Kaya Pendikar Alam Dato Paduka Seri Hasrin Sabtu DPKT DPMB SNB PBLI PJK PKLP
- هسرين سبتو
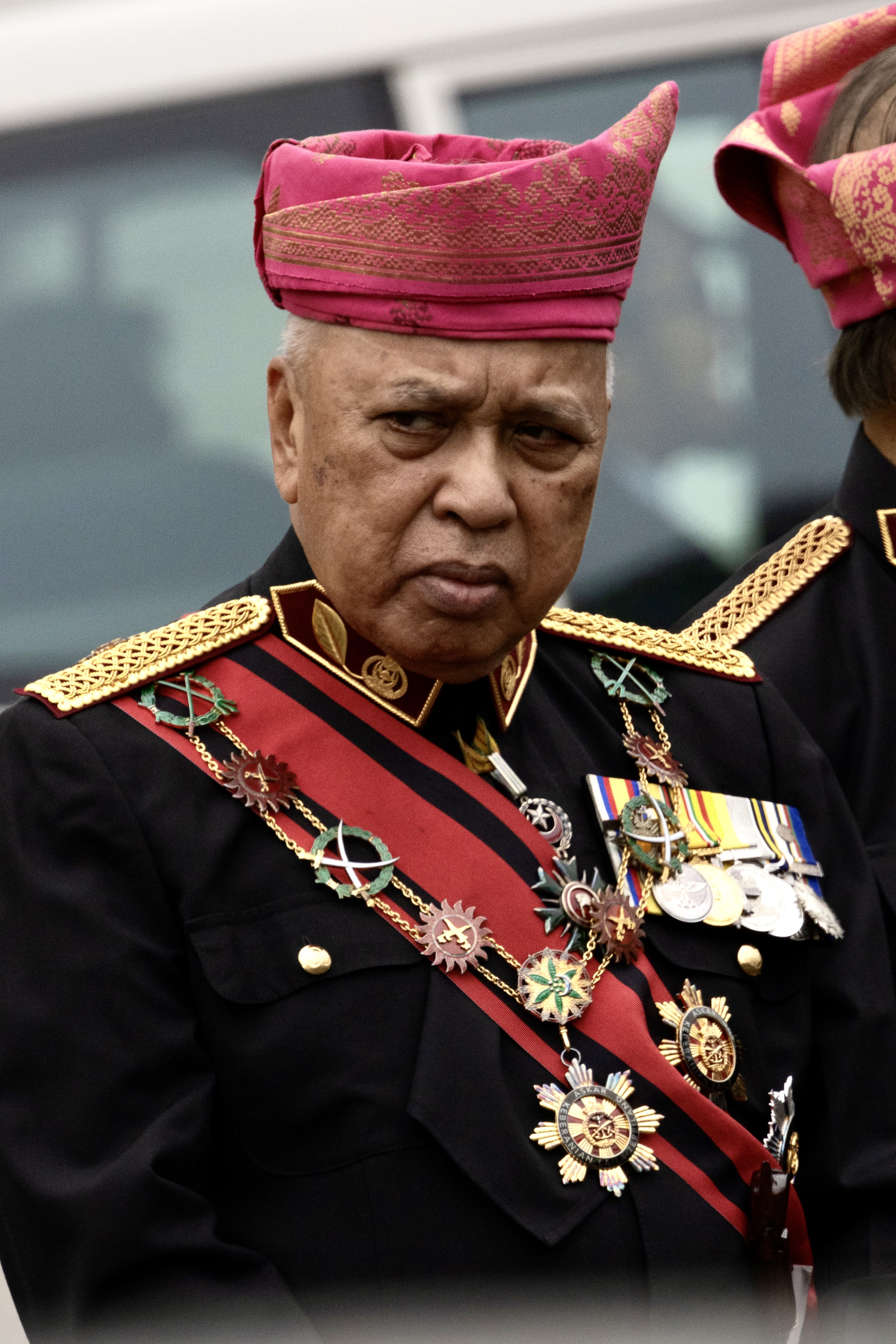
- Hasrin in 2024

Member of the Legislative Council
- In office 13 January 2017 – 6 March 2022

Commissioner of Police
- In office 25 February 2011 – 4 August 2013
- Monarch: Hassanal Bolkiah
- Preceded by: Zainuddin Jalani
- Succeeded by: Bahrin Mohd Noor

Personal details
- Born: 25 February 1954 (age 72) Brunei
- Education: National University of Malaysia
- Police career
- Country: Brunei
- Department: Royal Brunei Police Force
- Service years: 1973–2013
- Rank: Commissioner

Hasrin bin Haji Sabtu (born 25 February 1954) is a Bruneian aristocrat, politician and former police officer who served as the police commissioner of the Royal Brunei Police Force (RBPF) from 2011 to 2013, and member of Legislative Council (LegCo) from 2017 to 2022. Notably, he is the president of Retired Personnel of the Royal Brunei Police Force Association (POLSARA).

== Education ==
Hasrin received a diploma in police science from the National University of Malaysia after graduating.

== Police career ==
Joining the RBPF on 13 October 1973, Hasrin has worked in a variety of departments within the force, including the Logistics Department, police reserve unit, police headquarters, prosecution section, police station, and district police. From 1999 to 2007, he held the position of the Sultan's assistant director (ADR), director of Operations Department, deputy commissioner (Operations Department), and, on 25 February 2011, he was appointed police commissioner.

== Political career ==
On 13 January 2017, Hasrin was named to the Legislative Council. In advance of their meeting with the Ministry of Communications on 26 November 2018, a LegCo delegation led by Hasrin paid a working visit to the Land Transport Department (JPD) headquarters in Beribi on 14 October 2018, to observe the department's functions and public services and to familiarise themselves with problems came across in the nation's land transportation initiatives.

Hasrin headed the Brunei delegation to the 42nd ASEAN Inter-Parliamentary Assembly (AIPA) from 23 to 25 August 2021, where he emphasised the need of harmonisation, cybersecurity, and digital inclusion for global resilience and gender equality, as well as ASEAN's solidarity in times of crisis. Prior to this in August 2020, he once again led the same delegation to the 11th AIPA virtual meeting.

== Honours ==
Hasrin is bestowed the Manteri title of Pehin Orang Kaya Pendikar Alam on 1 April 2004. On 3 January 2013, He received the DUBC from President Tony Tan at a ceremony conducted in the Istana for the outstanding cooperation of the two police forces which has resulted in enormous operational successes for both nations in the fight against transnational crime and terrorism.

He has earned the following honours:

National

- Order of Paduka Keberanian Laila Terbilang First Class (DPKT; 15 July 2011) – Dato Paduka Seri
- Order of Seri Paduka Mahkota Brunei Second Class (DPMB; 15 July 2010) – Dato Paduka
- Order of Setia Negara Brunei Third Class (SNB)
- Pingat Bakti Laila Ikhlas (PBLI)
- Meritorious Service Medal (PJK)
- Police Long Service Medal (PKLP)
- Sultan of Brunei Silver Jubilee Medal (5 October 1992)
- National Day Silver Jubilee Medal (23 February 2009
- General Service Medal (Police)
- Police 75 Years Medal (1996)

Foreign

- Indonesia
  - Bintang Bhayangkara Utama (17 October 2012)
- Malaysia
  - Courageous Commander of the Most Gallant Police Order (PGPP; 22 October 2013)
- Singapore:
  - Darjah Utama Bakti Cemerlang (DUBC; 3 January 2013)

Police appointments
Preceded by Zainuddin Jalani	Commissioner of Police	Succeeded by Bahrin Mohd Noor
