= Brunei–Thailand relations =

- Brunei: Thailand

Diplomatic mission
- Bruneian Embassy, Bangkok: Thai Embassy, Bandar Seri Begawan

Envoy
- Ambassador Ismail bin Abd Manap: Ambassador Wnthanee Viputwongsakul

Brunei and Thailand have bilateral foreign relations. Brunei has an embassy in Bangkok, and Thailand has an embassy in Bandar Seri Begawan. The relations have always been close and cordial.

== History ==
Two Royal Thai Navy ships, HTMS Phosampton and HTMS Maeklong visited Bandar Brunei in March 1971.

Relations between the two countries have been established since 1984. In 2012, the Sultan of Brunei Hassanal Bolkiah made a state visit to Thailand, while Prime Minister Yingluck Shinawatra attended the Royal Wedding of the daughter of Bolkiah, Princess Hajah Hafizah Sururul Bolkiah in the same year.

== Economic relations ==
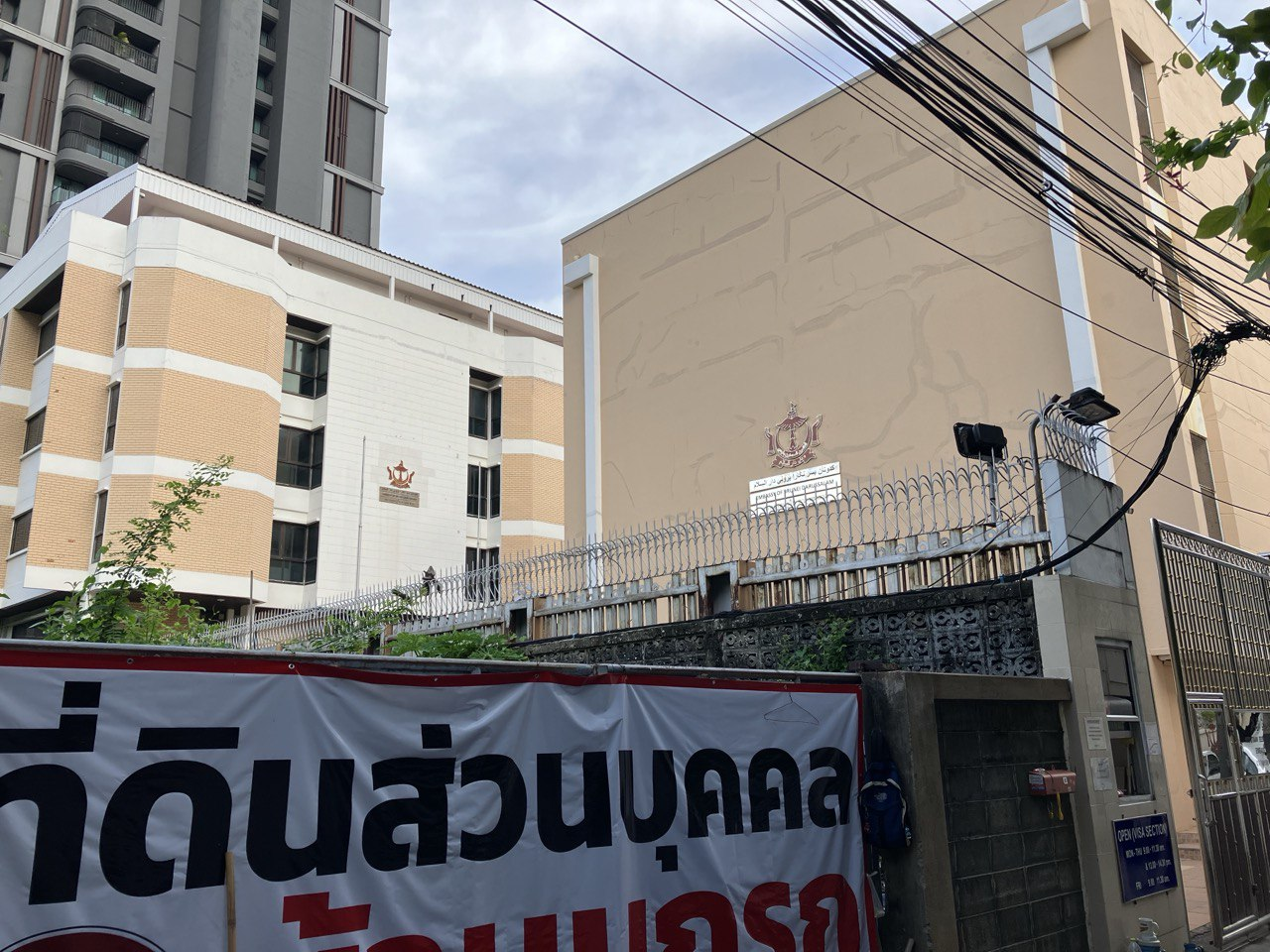
The Embassy of Brunei in Bangkok, Thailand

Both countries cooperates in agriculture, energy, education and halal co-operation and Thailand are currently seeking to invest in Brunei's oil and gas sector and develop joint projects in renewable energy. A memorandum of understanding also has been signed in agriculture co-operation, labour, avoidance of double taxation and anti-human trafficking. Thailand were the main provider for rice stock in Brunei which comprises 95% of the Brunei's rice stock. Beside that, Brunei also keen to learn rice production technology from Thailand. In 2011, Brunei were among the ninth largest trading partners for Thailand with the total trade between the two countries reached U$269 million. The major exports from Thailand include rice, cement, ceramics, rubber products, paper and pulp, while the imports from Brunei are mainly on iron and steel.

== See also ==
- Foreign relations of Brunei
- Foreign relations of Thailand
