= Manteri =

Political title in Brunei

The Manteri (Minister or Officer) are a group of state dignitaries within the Sultanate of Brunei whose position ranks the fourth-highest official in the country behind the Sultan. There are two main groups in the Manteri, namely the Manteri Berchiri and the Manteri Bertauliah. Each person who is given a position in the Manteri is also given a certain title. They are also referred to in official speech and correspondence with specific honorific references. The title of Manteri is given to ordinary people and is held in a ceremony, which for the awarding of the title of Pehin Manteri, it is known as "menyampiri gelaran".

== History ==
Before the era of the British protectorate (1906-1959), designated officials bestowed with traditional Brunei titles had access to political power, as titles not only were privileges but also came with their own obligations. These officials assisted in administrating the state by serving as a go-between for the monarch and the populace. Despite many of the initial tasks having been altered throughout time, the symbolic significance of titles and their relationship to political power still remain to this day.

In the past, holding traditional Brunei titles meant that officials also had territorial powers, or kuripan by virtue of their titles. This allowed them to manage finances, collect taxes and uphold the law in their respective territories. In the event of the official's demise or promotion, the control of these territories would be returned to the Sultan, unless a successor was appointed to the former's office.

Under the British protectorate, the traditional land system was dismantled and the kuripan's management was handed to the government upon the arrival of the British Resident, who also centralised power under his watch.

== Functions ==
Although titles are still awarded today, the functions that they entail have changed to reflect the needs of the contemporary political structure. For instance, Jamil Al-Sufri, who previously held the title of Pehin Orang Kaya Amar Diraja (responsible for the monitoring and dissemination of information) from 1968 to 1992, was the Principal of the Brunei History Centre. On another note, the nomination of traditional officials persists even though the contemporary administrative system has practically superseded the ancient political system. In addition to carrying out ceremonial duties, these officers serve as a conduit between the Sultan and his subjects, advising him on issues that impact the country as a whole.

Certain high-ranked royal officials in Brunei, such as the Pengiran Bendahara, and Pengiran Paduka Tuan, previously oversaw matters pertaining to Islam in the country. The Manteri-Manteri Ugama, which include the offices of Pehin Khatib and Mudim, have also assisted with the management of Islamic matters since the time of Sultan Saiful Rijal. Even during the era of the British protectorate, these religious leaders continued to influence national affairs, as exemplified by Pehin Tuan Imam Haji Mohidin bin Nakhoda Jambul's appointment to the State Council in 1907. This illustrates the government's efforts to elevate Islam's role in Brunei.

== Hierarchy ==
Ranked below the Cheteria, the Manteri offices and those held by non-nobles are noticeably more intricate. The Manteri are divided into two: Manteri Berchiri and Manteri Bertauliah, distinguished from one another by their ceremonial outfits and method of inauguration. The higher-ranked Manteri Berchiri are sworn in via the reading of a sacred proclamation called Chiri, which is written in a mixture of Sanskrit, Arabic, and Malay.

The appointment of the Manteri Bertauliah is carried out by the reading of the Surat Tauliah. The Manteri Bertauliah include the offices of Manteri Hulubalang (Defence officers), Manteri Istana (Palace officers), Manteri Darat (Interior land officers), and Manteri Pendalaman (Rural officers).

While the Manteri titles are customarily given to Malays, non-Malays can also be honoured with titles, which fall under the category of Manteri Dagang. The Chiri is also read during their appointments.

In Bruneian society, a person's position and status are indicated by a variety of characteristics. A royal court or state function's seating arrangement is one method. In seating configurations, di atas (upper) and di bawah (lower) are used as measurements. The top end, which is often the farthest from the door, is occupied by those of greatest status. The remaining guests are placed near the entrance in decreasing order of rank. Gradations of precedence may also be shown by a person's sitting arrangement, whereby those on the right are sat higher than those on the left.

Titles are typically awarded permanently, and titleholders will continue to be in possession of their titles even after death. It is common for officials to be promoted to a higher-ranked title. Though rather uncommon, titles may be inherited, as an official's successor may take office with the same title as his forebearer. On the other hand, there are instances where the sons of officials are sworn in with titles that differ from their dads.

=== Manteri Berchiri ===
The Manteri Berchiri are sworn in by the recitation of Chiri during the title ceremony. It is also known as Pehin Manteri because the Manteri in this group carry the title of Pehin. The positions are based on the system of Empat Lipatan (Four Folds) which is up to thirty-two folds. This meant that the bulk of the hierarchy are arranged in groups of 4, 8, 16, and 32 (the number is inversely related to the office rank). Officials of the Manteri 4 are superior than those belonging to the Manteri 8. These numerals are a reflection of Hinduism, which still has an impact on Brunei's ancient political structure. The positions in Manteri Berchiri are as follows in order of precedence:

- Ketua Kepala Manteri (Note: This sub-group is made up of only one title, i.e. Pehin Datu Perdana Manteri with the prefix of Yang Dimuliakan Lagi Dihormati who is head of the Manteri.)
- Kepala Manteri (Note: A sub-group of two people who are each given the prefix Yang Dimuliakan Lagi Dihormati.)
- Kepala Manteri Ugama (Note: This sub-group consists of only the Pehin Datu Seri Maharaja, head of the Manteri Ugama. His prefix is titled as Yang Dimuliakan Lagi Dihormati)
- Kepala Manteri 4
- Manteri Tambahan di Atas Manteri 4
- Manteri 4
- Manteri Dagang di Bawah Manteri 4 (Note: There are 24 posts that are specifically designated for non-indigenous individuals, making up the second branch of the aristocracy proper.)
- Manteri 8 or Manteri Pengalasan Besar
- Manteri Ugama di Bawah Manteri 8
- Manteri Ugama Tambahan di Bawah Manteri Ugama (below Manteri 8)
- Manteri 16 or Manteri Pengalasan Biasa
- Manteri 32 or Manteri Pengalasan Damit
- Manteri Tambahan di Bawah Manteri 32 (Note: A subset of the 32 aristocratic group, consisting of an additional set of 21 offices, is designated for top military and law enforcement personnel.)
- Manteri (Dalam) Istana (Note: Manteri Istana is reserved for palace-based positions with the first four are exclusive to women.)
- Manteri Ugama (Pehin Khatib)

=== Manteri Bertauliah ===
In contrast to the Manteri Berchiri, the granting of Manteri Bertauliah titles does not involve the reading of Chiri, but rather the Surat Tauliah (letter of commission or accreditation), and does not use the phrase "menyampiri". The Manteri Bertauliah has the following positions:

- Mudim
- Penglima
- Perwira
- Hulubalang (Note: The Manteri Hulubalang is a group of warrior-class offices that make up the third branch of the aristocracy proper.)
- Pahlawan
- Pateh
- Damong
- Pengarah
- Janang
- Malek
- Ketua Juru Laki
- Juru Laki
- Juru Bini
- Kepala Manteri Pendalaman
- Manteri Pendalaman or Manteri Darat (Note: The Manteri Pendalaman, also known as the Manteri Darat, is a branch of the Brunei aristocracy with officials assigned to each of the country's four districts. The Brunei-Muara district has 17 offices for the Manteri Pendalaman, while the Belait District has 12, the Temburong District has 8, and the Tutong District has 18 offices. Each district's Manteri Pendalaman serves specific local governance roles.)

== Title and styling ==
The difference between the titles for Manteri Berchiri and the Manteri Bertauliah is that only Manteri Berchiri has the title Pehin. However, there are two positions in the Manteri Berchiri that do not carry the title, namely the positions in the Manteri Istana that carry the titles Seri Lela Pengiring Diraja and Dayang-Dayang Diraja. The full title of Manteri Berchiri is Pehin followed by an additional phrase, which phrase may also use the titles of Manteri Bertauliah such as Orang Kaya and Datu for example Pehin Orang Kaya Pekerma Dewa and Pehin Datu Lailaraja.

For Manteri Bertauliah, the title is like the name of the position, for example Pengarah (Director), Mudim, and Hulubalang Diraja and Hulubalang Asgar. However, the base titles for Manteri Pendalaman or Manteri Darat are Orang Kaya and Datu and one position carries the title Bendahari. For the position of Pehin Khatib and Mudim, the incumbent has reached the age 55 and retired from public service, has the title Begawan added. Therefore, Pehin Khatib became Begawan Pehin Khatib and Mudim became Begawan Mudim.

Honorary styles for Manteri-Manteri are as follows:

- Yang Dimuliakan Lagi Dihormati (The Distinguished and Honoured) — Kepala Manteri, Kepala Manteri Ugama and Kepala Manteri 4
- Yang Dimuliakan (The Distinguished) — Manteri Berchiri
- Yang Mulia (The Respected) — Manteri Bertauliah

However, if a Manteri is a member of the Council of Cabinet Ministers, the Legislative Council or the Privy Council, his honorific reference is replaced by Yang Berhormat (The Honourable).

== Court uniform and dress ==
The colours and patterns of each office's ceremonial dastar (tengkolok), arat (belt), and sinjang (sarong) indicate the individual's rank. Their ceremonial outfit is adorned with a variety of colours and designs. There are more ranks for higher non-noble officials: 4, 8, 16, and 32. There is no differentiation in the colour and style of their uniforms inside this office, in contrast to the Cheteria. Their customary uniform material is a pink-coloured bunga butang arab gegati (rhombus and button floral designs) arranged in a dispersed manner.

Manteri Istana (Palace Officials), Manteri Agama (Religious Officials), Manteri Dagang (Officials of Foreigners), Manteri Hulubalang (Defence Officials), and Manteri Pedalaman (Inland Officials) are the lower-ranking non-noble traditional authorities in Brunei. Their costumes are different; the Manteri Pedalaman wears blue with a bunga kembang setahun theme, while the Manteri Istana and Manteri Hulubalang use purple fabric with a bunga tampuk manggis motif, all with a scarlet basis. Traditional religious leaders dress in an Arabic-style jubah (thawb)—black during the day and white at night—and a serban (turban). Invested officials' ceremonial attire during royal court events indicates their position. Certain authorities use traditional woven cloths with certain colors and designs as part of their ceremonial attire. Umbrellas and personal standards are also employed as concrete indicators of rank. Some leaders' personal standards serve as pretty accurate markers of their position and level of authority. The state flag is flown by average residents, whereas those descended from nobles have their own standards. The traditional officials' ceremonial attire and personal standard have a similar colour. The highest ranks of Brunei society are the only ones who wear umbrellas as a symbol of their position.

Musicians of Brunei's traditional royal orchestras, the smaller Naubat Diraja and the larger Gendang Jaga-Jaga, are ranked and appointed as Manteri Bertauliah and wear costumes similar to those of the others, however the former would wear just simple dress with the songkok on non-ceremonial days.

Additionally, there are two conventional commandants in public ceremonies who went by the names Panglima Diraja (Royal Commandant) and Panglima Asgar (Defense Commandant). These traditional commandants, during public events, are seen traveling in a vehicle that was ahead of the Sultan's on the route from the palace to the ceremonial venue. Upon reaching the venue, these commanders would then dismount out of their car and stationed themselves on each side of the grandstand's stairs, which was where the Sultan and Wazirs, together with the royal princes and princesses, are sitting. The commandants wore traditional purple woven sinjang, arat, and dastar with bunga bertabur and bunga tampuk manggis (mangosteen flower calyx) motifs, along with a scarlet traditional uniform. The Panglima Raja carries pemuras (blunderbuss) and kampilan (royal sword), or the royal pistol and ammunition container (karga), while the Panglima Asgar carries the kelasak (shield) and kampilan.

Copper, silver, and gold items used in royal ceremonies reveal the rank and identity of the owner. Items such as the keris (Malay dagger) and kaskol (gold betel container) were given to royal dignitaries who received the title of Wazir, Cheteria, and Manteri. The kaskol is only given to the Wazir and Kepala Cheteria while Cheteria-Cheteria and Manteri-Manteri such as Kepala Manteri and Kepala Manteri Empat receive the silver-born tipa (container or vessel to store betel and its seasonings) while copper-born tipa would be granted for the other officials.

Ceremonial uniforms of Manteri-Manteri

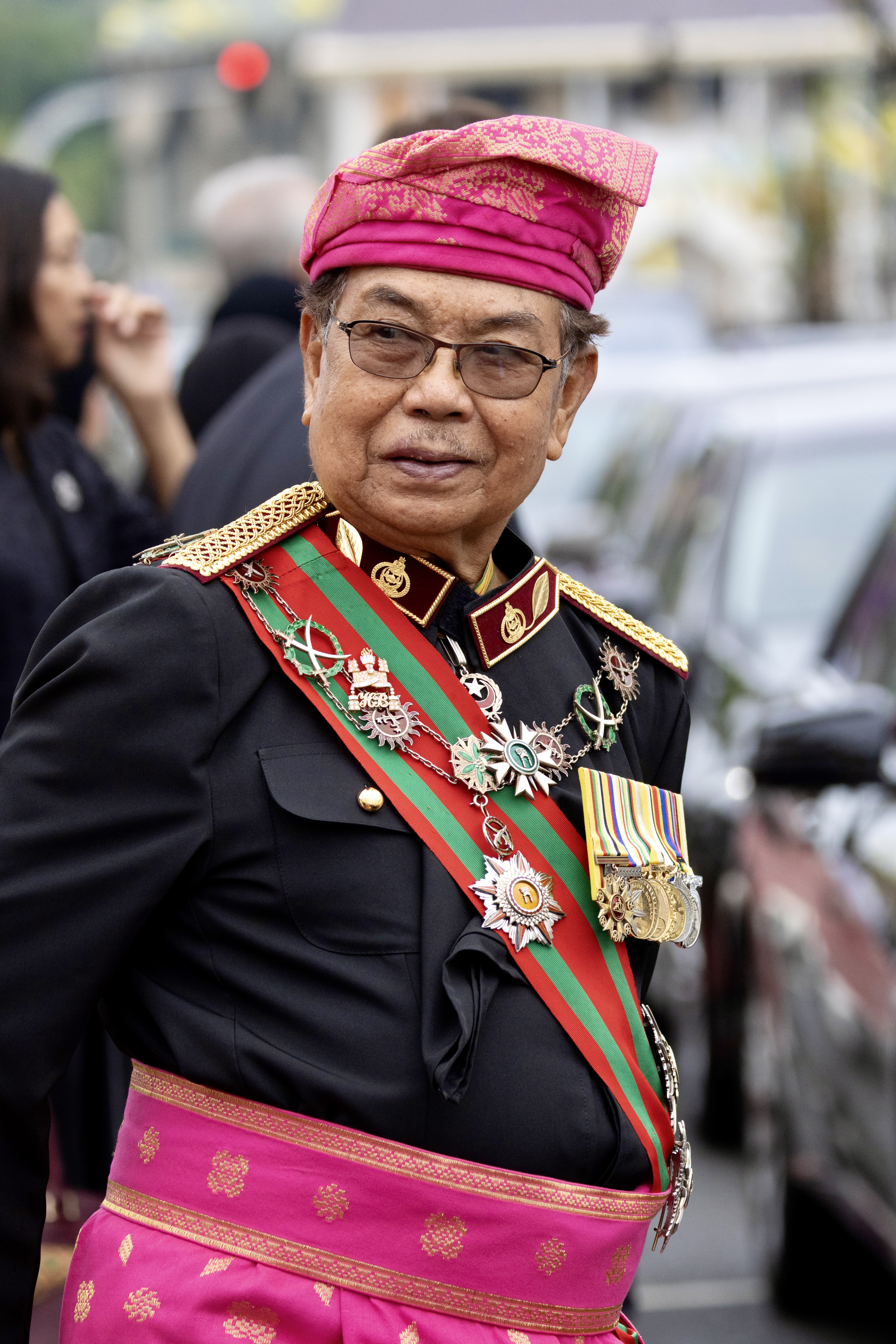
Mohammad Daud, Manteri 16

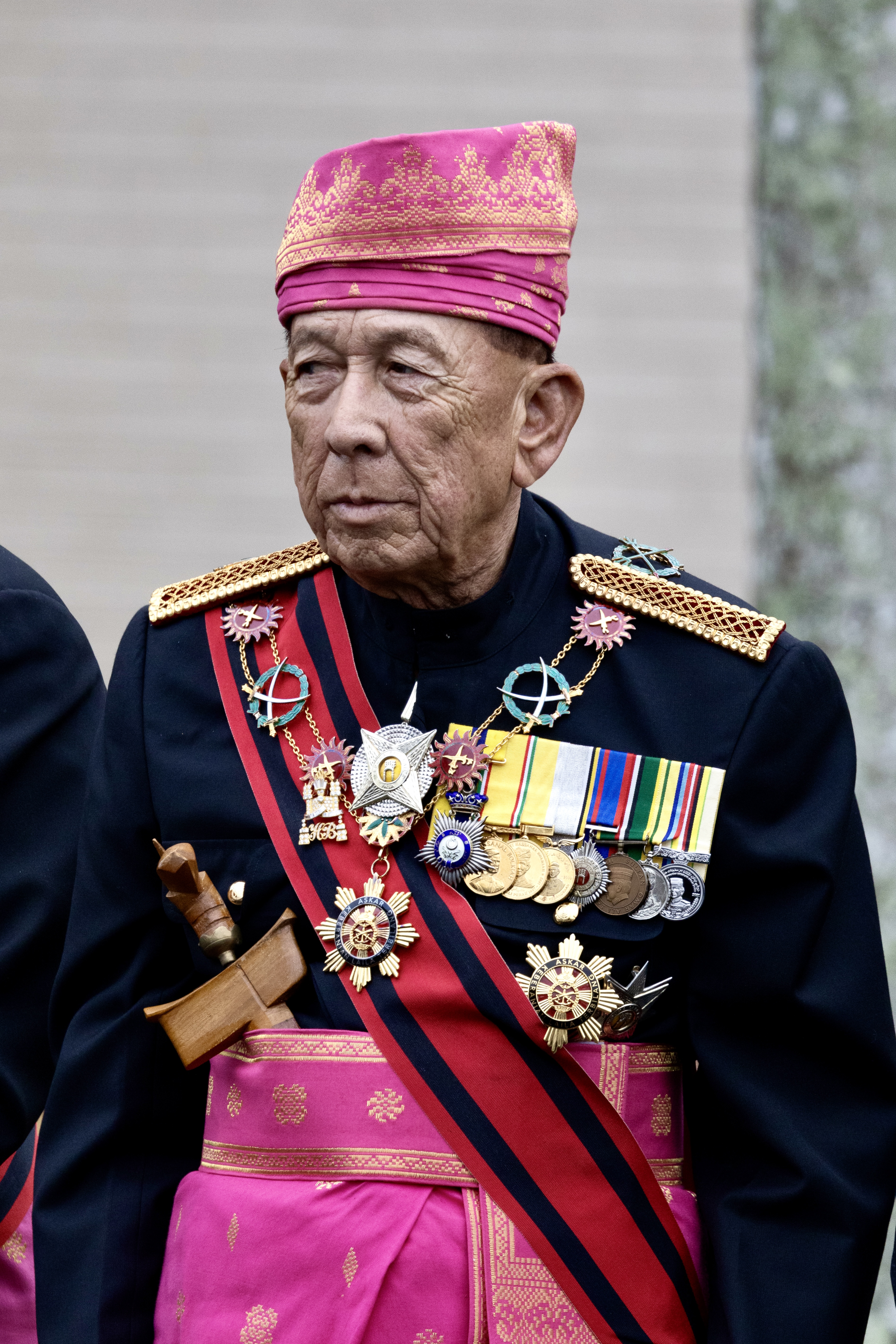
Jaafar Abdul Aziz, Manteri 32

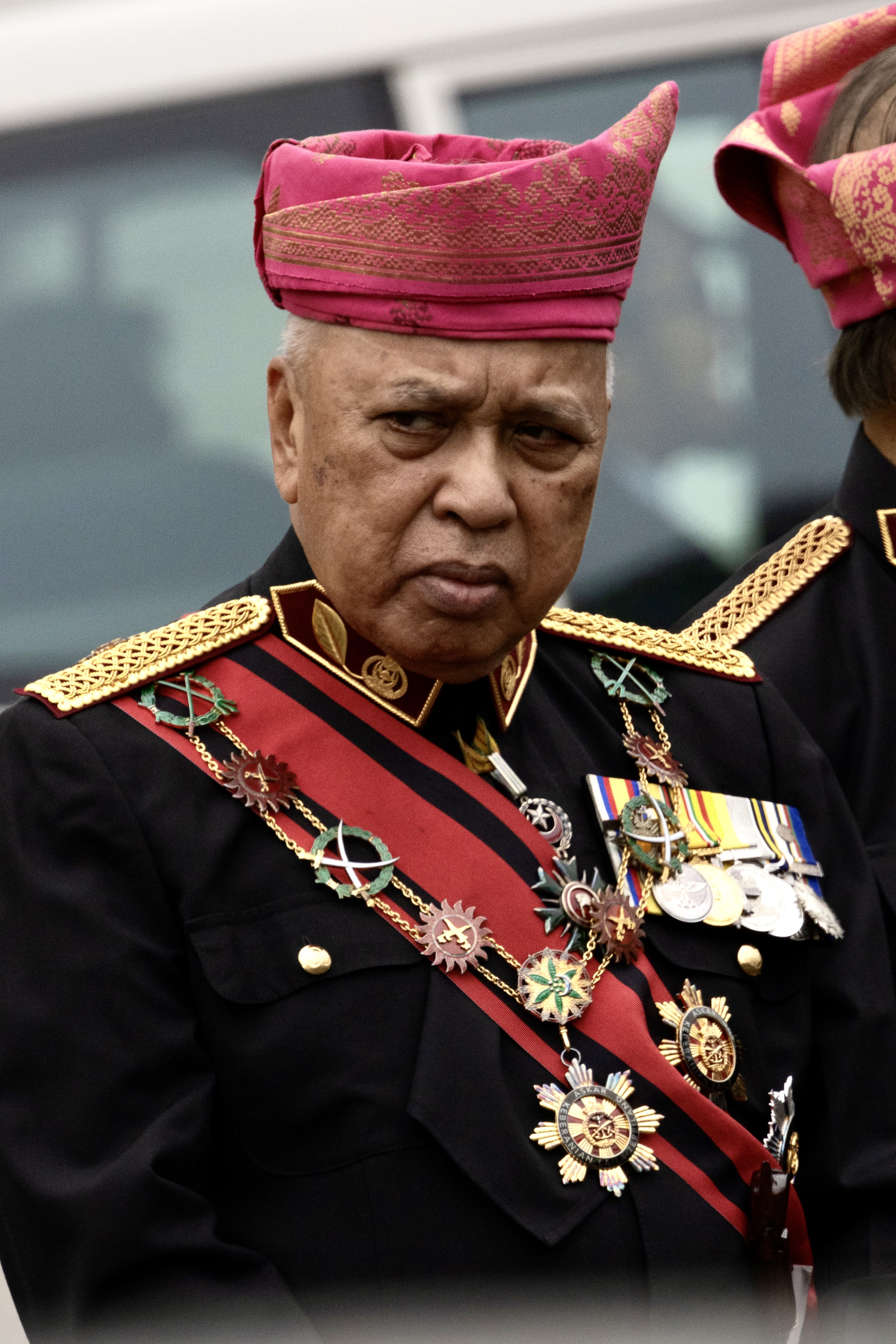
Hasrin Sabtu, Manteri 32

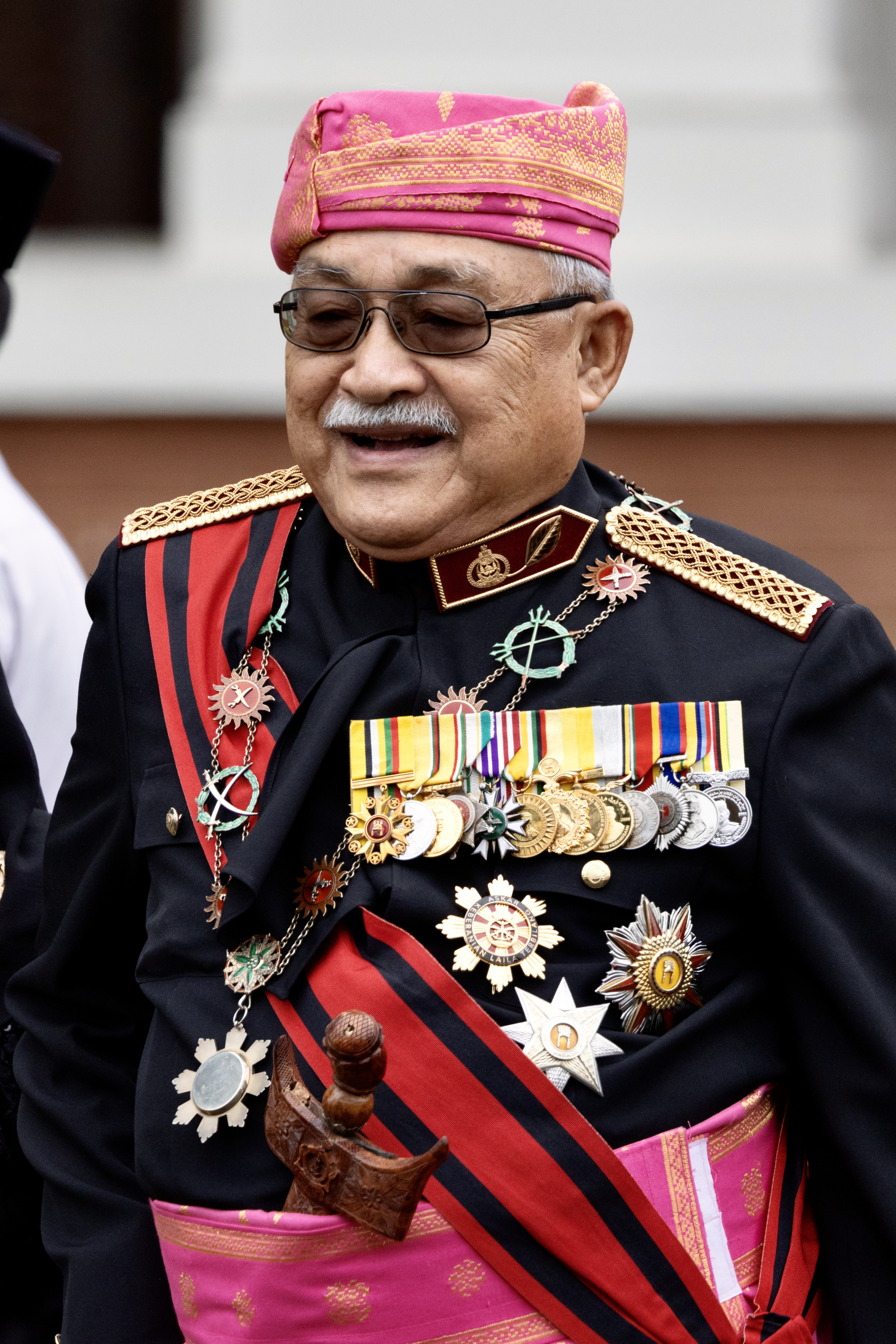
Husin Ahmad, Manteri Tambahan di Bawah Manteri 32

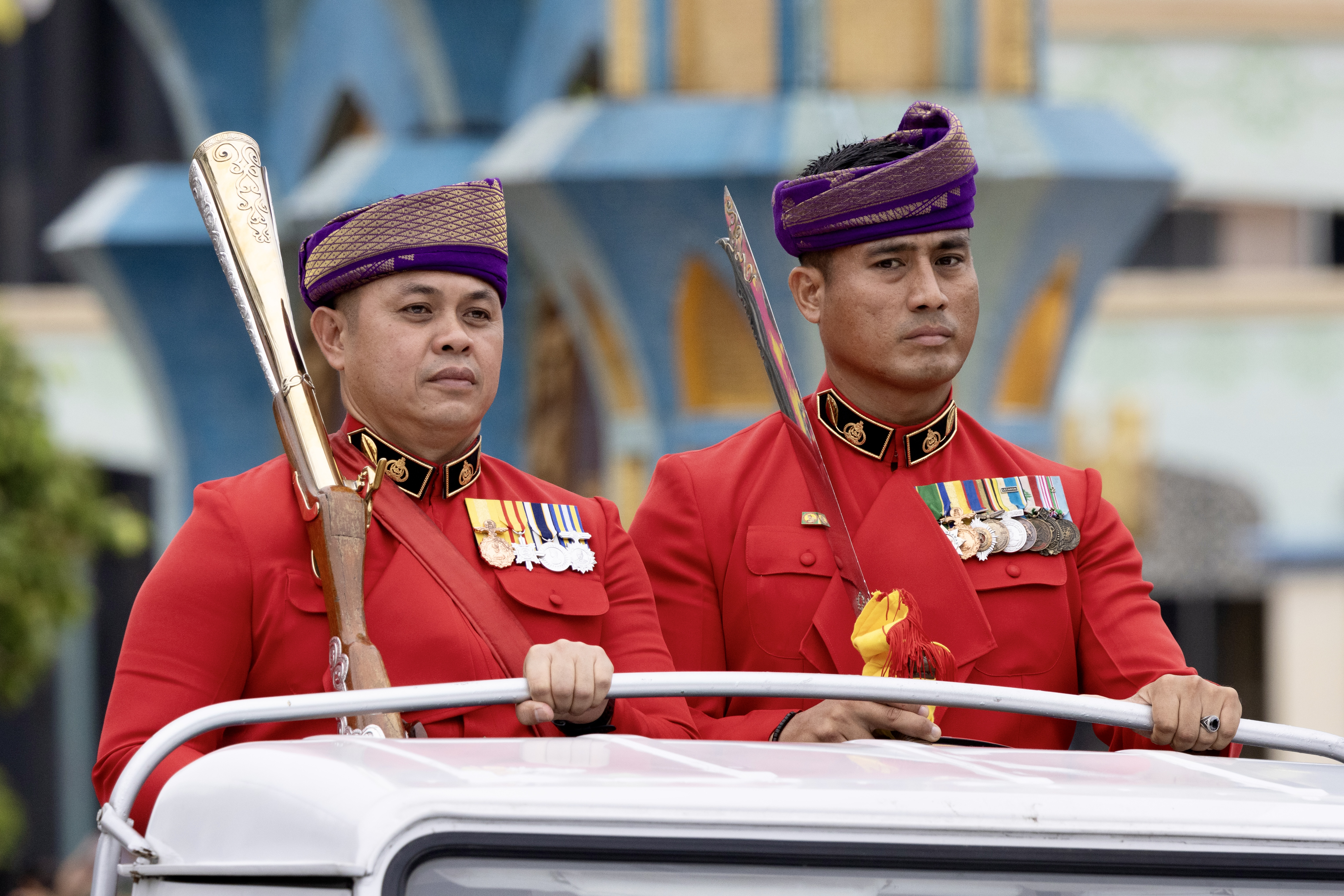
Panglima Raja and Panglima Asgar

== Manteri-manteri ==
=== Manteri Berchiri ===
The list of Manteri Berchiri below is as of 1 June 2025.

Title	Hierarchy	Incumbent	Predecessor
Pehin Datu Perdana Manteri	Ketua Kepala Manteri	Vacant	Yang Dimuliakan Lagi Dihormati Pehin Datu Perdana Manteri Dato Seri Utama Haji Awang Ibrahim bin Mohammad Ja'afar
Pehin Datu Seri Maharaja	Kepala Manteri Ugama	Yang Berhormat Pehin Datu Seri Maharaja Dato Paduka Seri Setia (Dr.) Ustaz Haji Awang Abdul Aziz bin Juned	Yang Dimuliakan Lagi Dihormati Pehin Datu Seri Maharaja Dato Seri Utama (Dr.) Awang Haji Ismail bin Omar Abdul Aziz
Pehin Orang Kaya Di-Gadong Seri Diraja	Kepala Manteri 4	Vacant	Yang Dimuliakan Lagi Dihormati Pehin Orang Kaya Di-Gadong Seri Diraja Dato Laila Utama Haji Awang Abdul Rahman bin Pehin Orang Kaya Shahbandar Haji Awang Mohammad Taha
Pehin Orang Kaya Di-Gadong Seri Lela	Kepala Manteri 4	Vacant	Yang Dimuliakan Lagi Dihormati Pehin Orang Kaya Digadong Seri Lela Dato Seri Paduka (Dr.) Haji Awang Hussain bin Pehin Orang Kaya Digadong Seri Diraja Dato Laila Utama Haji Awang Mohammad Yusof
Pehin Orang Kaya Penggawa (Pehin Orang Kaya Penggawa Laila Bentara Diraja)	Manteri Tambahan di Atas Manteri 4	Vacant	Yang Dimuliakan Pehin Orang Kaya Penggawa Laila Bentara Diraja Dato Laila Utama Haji Awang Mohammad Abbas Al-Sufri bin Pehin Datu Perdana Manteri Dato Laila Utama Haji Awang Ibrahim
Pehin Orang Kaya Laila Setia Bakti Diraja	Manteri Tambahan di Atas Manteri 4	Yang Berhormat Pehin Orang Kaya Laila Setia Bakti Diraja Dato Laila Utama Haji Awang Isa bin Pehin Datu Perdana Manteri Dato Laila Utama Haji Awang Ibrahim	Office established
Pehin Sanggamara Asgar Diraja	Manteri Tambahan di Atas Manteri 4	Vacant	Yang Dimuliakan Pehin Sanggamara Asgar Diraja Major Alister Edward Gerald Gauntlett
Pehin Orang Kaya Laila Wijaya	Manteri Tambahan di Atas Manteri 4	Yang Berhormat Pehin Orang Kaya Laila Wijaya Dato Seri Setia (Dr.) Haji Awang Abdul Aziz bin Begawan Pehin Udana Khatib Dato' Seri Paduka Haji Awang Umar	Office established
Pehin Jawatan Dalam Seri Maharaja	Manteri 4	Vacant	Yang Dimuliakan Pehin Jawatan Dalam Seri Maharaja Dato Seri Utama Haji Awang Mohd. Jamil Al-Sufri bin Begawan Pehin Udana Khatib Dato Seri Paduka Haji Awang Umar
Pehin Jawatan Luar Pekerma Raja	Manteri 4	Vacant	Yang Berhormat Pehin Jawatan Luar Pekerma Raja Dato Seri Utama (Dr.) Ustaz Haji Awang Mohammad Zain bin Haji Serudin
Pehin Orang Kaya Laksamana	Manteri 4	Vacant	Yang Dimuliakan Pehin Orang Kaya Laksamana Dato Seri Setia Awang Haji Mohd. Taha bin Haji Bakir
Pehin Orang Kaya Shahbandar	Manteri 4	Vacant	Yang Dimuliakan Pehin Orang Kaya Shahbandar Dato Seri Setia Haji Awang Mohd. Nawawi bin Pehin Orang Kaya Shahbandar Haji Awang Mohd. Taha
Pehin Orang Kaya Datu Petinggi Maha Kornia Diraja	Manteri Dagang di Bawah Manteri 4	Vacant	Yang Dimuliakan Pehin Orang Kaya Datu Patinggi Maha Kornia Diraja Dato Seri Utama Sir Dennis Charles White
Pehin Datu Saudagar Derma Laila	Manteri Dagang di Bawah Manteri 4	Vacant	Yang Dimuliakan Pehin Datu Saudagar Derma Laila Dato Seri Setia Raoul Teesdale Lloyd-Dolbey
Pehin Orang Kaya Khazanah Negara Laila Diraja	Manteri Dagang di Bawah Manteri 4	Vacant	Yang Dimuliakan Pehin Orang Kaya Khazanah Negara Laila Diraja Dato Laila Utama John Lee
Pehin Orang Kaya Tabib Laila Diraja	Manteri Dagang di Bawah Manteri 4	Vacant	Yang Dimuliakan Pehin Orang Kaya Tabib Laila Diraja Dato Seri Paduka Major John Moran
Pehin Datu Pahlawan Diraja	Manteri Dagang di Bawah Manteri 4	Vacant	Yang Dimuliakan Pehin Datu Pahlawan Diraja Dato Seri Pahlawan James Richard Henry Burns
Pehin Datu Permakawi Diraja	Manteri Dagang di Bawah Manteri 4	Vacant	Yang Dimuliakan Pehin Datu Permakawi Diraja Flight Lieutenant Dato Seri Pahlawan George Edwin Coster
Pehin Orang Kaya Datu Setia Diraja	Manteri Dagang di Bawah Manteri 4	Vacant	Yang Dimuliakan Pehin Orang Kaya Datu Setia Diraja Dato Seri Paduka William Ian Glass
Pehin Datu Laila Didekan	Manteri Dagang di Bawah Manteri 4	Vacant	Yang Dimuliakan Pehin Datu Laila Didekan Dato Seri Laila Jasa A.D. Bumford
Pehin Datu Tabib Laila Adunan Diraja	Manteri Dagang di Bawah Manteri 4	Vacant	Yang Dimuliakan Pehin Datu Tabib Laila Adunan Diraja Dato Seri Laila Jasa (Mr.) Ian Antrobus Harris
Pehin Datu Tambang Layaran Laila Diraja	Manteri Dagang di Bawah Manteri 4	Vacant	Yang Dimuliakan Pehin Datu Tambang Layaran Laila Diraja Dato Seri Laila Jasa Jack Turner
Pehin Orang Kaya Datu Tabib Laila Setia	Manteri Dagang di Bawah Manteri 4	Vacant	Unknown
Pehin Datu Temanggong	Manteri Dagang di Bawah Manteri 4	Vacant	Yang Dimuliakan Pehin Datu Temanggong Dato Paduka Lim Teck Hoo
Pehin Datu Bendahari China Bandar, Bandar Seri Begawan	Manteri Dagang di Bawah Manteri 4	Vacant	Yang Dimuliakan Pehin Datu Bendahari China Bandar, Bandar Seri Begawan Khoo Ban Hock
Pehin Orang Kaya Datu Tabib Indera Setia	Manteri Dagang di Bawah Manteri 4	Vacant	Unknown
Pehin Kapitan China Kornia Diraja	Manteri Dagang di Bawah Manteri 4	Vacant	Yang Dimuliakan Pehin Kapitan China Kornia Diraja Dato Paduka Lau Ah Kok
Pehin Datu Laila Setiawan	Manteri Dagang di Bawah Manteri 4	Vacant	Yang Dimuliakan Pehin Datu Laila Setiawan Dato Seri Laila Jasa William Henry Doughty
Pehin Datu Derma Setia	Manteri Dagang di Bawah Manteri 4	Vacant	Yang Dimuliakan Pehin Datu Derma Setia Dato Seri Laila Jasa P. A. Coates
Pehin Orang Kaya Laila Kanun Diraja	Manteri Dagang di Bawah Manteri 4	Vacant	Yang Dimuliakan Pehin Orang Kaya Laila Kanun Diraja Dato Laila Utama Idris Talog Davies
Pehin Datu Tabib Laila Lutanan Diraja	Manteri Dagang di Bawah Manteri 4	Vacant	Yang Dimuliakan Pehin Datu Tabib Laila Lutanan Diraja Dato Seri Paduka (Dr.) Peter Loy de Villiers Hart
Pehin Datu Amar Setia Diraja	Manteri Dagang di Bawah Manteri 4	Vacant	Yang Dimuliakan Pehin Datu Amar Setia Diraja Haji Awang Kassim bin Awang Tamin
Pehin Datu Saudagar	Manteri Dagang di Bawah Manteri 4	Vacant	Yang Dimuliakan Pehin Datu Saudagar Lim Thian Hoo
Pehin Bendahari China Kornia Diraja	Manteri Dagang di Bawah Manteri 4	Vacant	Yang Dimuliakan Pehin Bendahari China Kornia Diraja Ng Teck Hock
Pehin Kapitan Lela Diraja	Manteri Dagang di Bawah Manteri 4	Yang Dimuliakan Pehin Kapitan Lela Diraja Dato Paduka Goh King Chin	Yang Dimuliakan Pehin Kapitan Lela Diraja Lim See King
Pehin Bendahari China	Manteri Dagang di Bawah Manteri 4	Yang Dimuliakan Pehin Bendahari China Dato Paduka Onn Siew Siong	Unknown
Pehin Orang Kaya Maharaja Diraja	Manteri 8 or Manteri Pengalasan Besar	Yang Berhormat Pehin Orang Kaya Maharaja Diraja Dato Seri Paduka Awang Haji Abdul Wahab bin Haji Md. Said	Yang Dimuliakan Pehin Orang Kaya Maharaja Diraja Dato Paduka Haji Awang Zainal bin Awang Abdul Rahman
Pehin Orang Kaya Perdana Wangsa	Manteri 8 or Manteri Pengalasan Besar	Vacant	Unknown
Pehin Orang Kaya Perdana Indera	Manteri 8 or Manteri Pengalasan Besar	Vacant	Yang Dimuliakan Pehin Orang Kaya Perdana Indera Awang Haji Mohammad Taha bin Haji Bakir
Pehin Orang Kaya Amar Diraja	Manteri 8 or Manteri Pengalasan Besar	Vacant	Yang Dimuliakan Pehin Orang Kaya Amar Diraja Dato Seri Utama Haji Awang Mohd. Jamil Al-Sufri bin Begawan Pehin Udana Khatib Dato Seri Paduka Haji Awang Umar
Pehin Orang Kaya Ratna Diraja	Manteri 8 or Manteri Pengalasan Besar	Vacant	Yang Dimuliakan Pehin Orang Kaya Ratna Diraja Dato Seri Utama (Dr.) Ustaz Haji Awang Mohammad Zain bin Haji Serudin
Pehin Orang Kaya Seri Diraja	Manteri 8 or Manteri Pengalasan Besar	Vacant	Unknown
Pehin Orang Kaya Udana Laila	Manteri 8 or Manteri Pengalasan Besar	Vacant	Yang Dimuliakan Pehin Orang Kaya Udana Laila Dato Paduka Haji Awang Omar bin Awang Mat Serudin
Pehin Orang Kaya Seri Wangsa	Manteri 8 or Manteri Pengalasan Besar	Vacant	Yang Dimuliakan Pehin Orang Kaya Seri Wangsa Dato Paduka Haji Awang Matserudin bin Pehin Tuan Imam Awang Abdul Rahman
Pehin Datu Imam	Manteri Ugama di Bawah Manteri 8	Vacant	Yang Dimuliakan Pehin Datu Imam Dato Paduka Seri Setia Ustaz Haji Awang Abdul Hamid bin Bakal
Pehin Seri Raja Khatib / Pehin Siraja Khatib	Manteri Ugama di Bawah Manteri 8	Vacant	Yang Dimuliakan Pehin Siraja Khatib Dato Paduka Seri Setia (Dr.) Ustaz Awang Haji Yahya bin Haji Ibrahim
Pehin Tuan Imam	Manteri Ugama di Bawah Manteri 8	Vacant	Yang Dimuliakan Pehin Tuan Imam Dato Paduka Seri Setia (Dr.) Ustaz Haji Awang Abdul Aziz bin Juned
Pehin Udana Khatib	Manteri Ugama di Bawah Manteri 8	Yang Berhormat Pehin Udana Khatib Dato Paduka Seri Setia Ustaz Haji Awang Badaruddin bin Pengarah Dato Paduka Haji Awang Othman	Yang Dimuliakan Pehin Udana Khatib Dato Paduka Seri Setia (Dr.) Ustaz Haji Awang Abdul Aziz bin Juned
Pehin Orang Kaya Paduka Setia Raja	Manteri Ugama Tambahan di Bawah Manteri Ugama	Yang Dimuliakan Pehin Orang Kaya Paduka Setia Raja Dato Paduka Seri Setia Haji Awang Suhaili bin Haji Mohiddin	Office established
Pehin Orang Kaya Paduka Seri Utama	Manteri Ugama Tambahan di Bawah Manteri Ugama	Yang Berhormat Pehin Orang Kaya Paduka Seri Utama Dato Paduka Seri Setia Haji Awang Salim bin Haji Besar	Office established
Pehin Orang Kaya Lela Wangsa	Manteri 16 or Manteri Pengalasan Biasa	Vacant	Yang Dimuliakan Pehin Orang Kaya Lela Wangsa Dato Seri Paduka Haji Mohd Salleh bin Haji Masri
Pehin Orang Kaya Indera Wangsa	Manteri 16 or Manteri Pengalasan Biasa	Vacant	Unknown
Pehin Orang Kaya Indera Dewa	Manteri 16 or Manteri Pengalasan Biasa	Vacant	Yang Dimuliakan Pehin Orang Kaya Indera Dewa Dato Paduka Haji Musa bin Hitam
Pehin Orang Kaya Udana Indera	Manteri 16 or Manteri Pengalasan Biasa	Vacant	Unknown
Pehin Orang Kaya Udana Sura	Manteri 16 or Manteri Pengalasan Biasa	Vacant	Unknown
Pehin Orang Kaya Seri Nara Indera	Manteri 16 or Manteri Pengalasan Biasa	Vacant	Unknown
Pehin Orang Kaya Sudana Indera	Manteri 16 or Manteri Pengalasan Biasa	Vacant	Unknown
Pehin Orang Kaya Indera Laila	Manteri 16 or Manteri Pengalasan Biasa	Vacant	Yang Dimuliakan Pehin Orang Kaya Indera Laila Dato Seri Utama Haji Ismail bin Serudin
Pehin Orang Kaya Udana Setia	Manteri 16 or Manteri Pengalasan Biasa	Vacant	Unknown
Pehin Orang Kaya Seri Lela	Manteri 16 or Manteri Pengalasan Biasa	Yang Berhormat Pehin Orang Kaya Seri Lela Dato Seri Setia Awang Haji Abdul Rahman bin Dato Setia Haji Mohamed Taib	Unknown
Pehin Orang Kaya Seri Kerna	Manteri 16 or Manteri Pengalasan Biasa	Yang Berhormat Pehin Orang Kaya Seri Kerna Dato Seri Setia (Dr.) Haji Awang Abu Bakar bin Haji Apong	Unknown
Pehin Orang Kaya Seri Dewa	Manteri 16 or Manteri Pengalasan Biasa	Yang Dimuliakan Pehin Orang Kaya Seri Dewa Major General (R) Dato Seri Pahlawan Awang Haji Mohammad bin Haji Daud	Office established
Pehin Orang Kaya Ratna Dewa	Manteri 16 or Manteri Pengalasan Biasa	Vacant	Unknown
Pehin Orang Kaya Indera Sugara	Manteri 16 or Manteri Pengalasan Biasa	Vacant	Unknown
Pehin Orang Kaya Ratna Setia	Manteri 16 or Manteri Pengalasan Biasa	Vacant	Yang Dimuliakan Pehin Orang Kaya Ratna Setia Dato Seri Setia Haji Awang Abdul Hapidz bin Pehin Orang Kaya Laksamana Haji Awang Abdul Razak
Pehin Orang Kaya Kesuma	Manteri 16 or Manteri Pengalasan Biasa	Vacant	Yang Dimuliakan Pehin Orang Kaya Kesuma Dato Paduka Haji Awang Ali bin Ismail
Pehin Orang Kaya Setia Pahlawan	Manteri 32 or Manteri Pengalasan Damit	Yang Dimuliakan Pehin Orang Kaya Setia Pahlawan Dato Seri Setia (Dr.) Awang Haji Ahmad bin Haji Jumat	Yang Dimuliakan Pehin Orang Kaya Setia Pahlawan Dato Seri Setia Awang Haji Abdul Rahman bin Dato Setia Haji Mohamed Taib
Pehin Orang Kaya Amar Pahlawan	Manteri 32 or Manteri Pengalasan Damit	Vacant	Yang Dimuliakan Pehin Orang Kaya Amar Pahlawan Dato Seri Setia Awang Haji Zakaria bin Datu Mahawangsa Haji Sulaiman
Pehin Orang Kaya Johan Pahlawan	Manteri 32 or Manteri Pengalasan Damit	Yang Berhormat Pehin Orang Kaya Johan Pahlawan Dato Seri Setia Haji Awang Adanan bin Begawan Pehin Siraja Khatib Dato' Seri Setia Haji Awang Mohd. Yusof	Unknown
Pehin Orang Kaya Hamzah Pahlawan	Manteri 32 or Manteri Pengalasan Damit	Yang Berhormat Pehin Orang Kaya Hamzah Pahlawan Dato Seri Setia Awang Haji Abdullah bin Begawan Mudim Dato Paduka Haji Bakar	Unknown
Pehin Orang Kaya Indera Pahlawan	Manteri 32 or Manteri Pengalasan Damit	Yang Berhormat Pehin Orang Kaya Indera Pahlawan Dato Seri Setia Awang Haji Suyoi bin Haji Osman	Unknown
Pehin Orang Kaya Dewa Pahlawan	Manteri 32 or Manteri Pengalasan Damit	Yang Dimuliakan Pehin Orang Kaya Dewa Pahlawan Dato Paduka Awang Haji Dani bin Haji Ibrahim	Unknown
Pehin Orang Kaya Seri Pahlawan	Manteri 32 or Manteri Pengalasan Damit	Yang Dimuliakan Pehin Orang Kaya Seri Pahlawan Colonel (R) Dato Paduka Awang Haji Abdu'r Rahmani bin Dato Paduka Haji Basir	Unknown
Pehin Orang Kaya Lela Pahlawan	Manteri 32 or Manteri Pengalasan Damit	Yang Dimuliakan Pehin Orang Kaya Lela Pahlawan Major General (R) Dato Paduka Seri Awang Haji Mohd. Jaafar bin Haji Abdul Aziz	Unknown
Pehin Orang Kaya Maharaja Seri Rama	Manteri 32 or Manteri Pengalasan Damit	Vacant	Yang Dimuliakan Pehin Orang Kaya Maharaja Seri Rama Dato Seri Laila Jasa Awang Haji Mohammad bin Abdul Momin
Pehin Orang Kaya Maharaja Kerna	Manteri 32 or Manteri Pengalasan Damit	Yang Dimuliakan Pehin Orang Kaya Maharaja Kerna Dato Paduka Seri Awang Haji Ya'akub bin Pehin Orang Kaya Maharaja Diraja Dato Paduka Haji Awang Zainal	Unknown
Pehin Orang Kaya Maharaja Salia	Manteri 32 or Manteri Pengalasan Damit	Yang Dimuliakan Pehin Orang Kaya Maharaja Salia Dato' Paduka Awang Haji Mohd. Tarif bin Pehin Orang Kaya Perdana Wangsa Haji Muhammad	Unknown
Pehin Orang Kaya Saiful Mulok	Manteri 32 or Manteri Pengalasan Damit	Vacant	Yang Dimuliakan Pehin Orang Kaya Saiful Mulok Dato Seri Paduka Awang Haji Abidin bin Orang Kaya Periwara Abdul Rashid
Pehin Orang Kaya Pendikar Alam	Manteri 32 or Manteri Pengalasan Damit	Yang Dimuliakan Pehin Orang Kaya Pendikar Alam Dato Paduka Seri Awang Haji Hasrin bin Dato Paduka Haji Sabtu	Unknown
Pehin Orang Kaya Setia Raja	Manteri 32 or Manteri Pengalasan Damit	Vacant	Yang Dimuliakan Pehin Orang Kaya Setia Raja Dato Seri Paduka Haji Awang Mohammad Ali bin Haji Mohammad Daud
Pehin Orang Kaya Setia Wangsa	Manteri 32 or Manteri Pengalasan Damit	Vacant	Yang Dimuliakan Pehin Orang Kaya Setia Wangsa Dato Paduka Seri Laila Jasa Awang Haji Ahmad Wally Skinner
Pehin Orang Kaya Laila Setia	Manteri 32 or Manteri Pengalasan Damit	Yang Dimuliakan Pehin Orang Kaya Laila Setia Dato Seri Setia Haji Awang Abdul Rahman bin Haji Ibrahim	Yang Dimuliakan Pehin Orang Kaya Laila Setia Dato Seri Setia Haji Awang Mohd. Nawawi bin Pehin Orang Kaya Shahbandar Haji Awang Mohd. Taha
Pehin Orang Kaya Setia Jaya	Manteri 32 or Manteri Pengalasan Damit	Vacant	Yang Dimuliakan Pehin Orang Kaya Setia Jaya Dato Paduka Haji Awang Abu Hurairah bin Pehin Orang Kaya Di-Gadong Seri Lela Dato Seri Utama Haji Awang Mohd. Taha
Pehin Orang Kaya Lela Raja	Manteri 32 or Manteri Pengalasan Damit	Vacant	Yang Dimuliakan Pehin Orang Kaya Lela Raja Dato Seri Laila Jasa Haji Awang Abdul Rahman bin Haji Abdul Karim
Pehin Orang Kaya Lela Sura	Manteri 32 or Manteri Pengalasan Damit	Yang Dimuliakan Pehin Orang Kaya Lela Sura Dato Seri Laila Jasa Awang Haji Abas bin Haji Serudin	Unknown
Pehin Orang Kaya Laila Perkasa	Manteri 32 or Manteri Pengalasan Damit	Yang Dimuliakan Pehin Orang Kaya Laila Perkasa Colonel (R) Dato Paduka Awang Haji Mahdini bin Dato Paduka Haji Basir	Office established
Pehin Orang Kaya Lela Utama	Manteri 32 or Manteri Pengalasan Damit	Vacant	Yang Dimuliakan Pehin Orang Kaya Lela Utama Dato Paduka Awang Haji Jaya bin Abdul Latif
Pehin Orang Kaya Putera Maharaja	Manteri 32 or Manteri Pengalasan Damit	Yang Dimuliakan Pehin Orang Kaya Putera Maharaja Dato Paduka Awang Haji Abdul Ghani bin Pehin Datu Pekerma Dewa Dato Paduka Haji Abdul Rahim	Yang Dimuliakan Pehin Orang Kaya Putera Maharaja Dato Seri Setia (Dr.) Haji Awang Abu Bakar bin Haji Apong
Pehin Orang Kaya Pekerma Dewa	Manteri 32 or Manteri Pengalasan Damit	Yang Berhormat Pehin Orang Kaya Pekerma Dewa Dato Seri Setia Lim Jock Seng	Unknown
Pehin Orang Kaya Pekerma Indera	Manteri 32 or Manteri Pengalasan Damit	Vacant	Yang Dimuliakan Pehin Orang Kaya Pekerma Indera Dato Paduka Awang Haji Sidek bin Yahya
Pehin Orang Kaya Pekerma Jaya	Manteri 32 or Manteri Pengalasan Damit	Yang Dimuliakan Pehin Orang Kaya Pekerma Jaya Dato Paduka Awang Haji Judin bin Haji Asar	Unknown
Pehin Orang Kaya Pekerma Lela	Manteri 32 or Manteri Pengalasan Damit	Yang Dimuliakan Pehin Orang Kaya Pekerma Lela Dato Paduka Haji Awang Chuchu bin Panglima Asgar Dato Paduka Haji Awang Abdullah	Unknown
Pehin Orang Kaya Pekerma Laila Diraja	Manteri 32 or Manteri Pengalasan Damit	Yang Berhormat Pehin Orang Kaya Pekerma Laila Diraja Dato Seri Setia Awang Haji Hazair bin Haji Abdullah	Yang Dimuliakan Pehin Orang Kaya Pekerma Laila Diraja Dato Seri Paduka Awang Haji Abdul Wahab bin Haji Md. Said
Pehin Orang Kaya Pekerma Setia	Manteri 32 or Manteri Pengalasan Damit	Yang Dimuliakan Pehin Orang Kaya Pekerma Setia Dato Paduka Awang Haji Abdul Rahman bin Kani	Unknown
Pehin Orang Kaya Pekerma Sura	Manteri 32 or Manteri Pengalasan Damit	Yang Dimuliakan Pehin Orang Kaya Pekerma Sura Awang Haji Abdul Aziz bin Abdul Rahman	Unknown
Pehin Orang Kaya Seri Utama	Manteri 32 or Manteri Pengalasan Damit	Yang Berhormat Pehin Orang Kaya Seri Utama Dato Seri Setia Awang Haji Yahya bin Begawan Mudim Dato Paduka Haji Bakar	Unknown
Pehin Orang Kaya Pekerma Sura Pahlawan	Manteri 32 or Manteri Pengalasan Damit	Yang Dimuliakan Pehin Orang Kaya Seri Sura Pahlawan Dato Paduka Awang Haji Mohd. Tahir bin Metassan	Yang Dimuliakan Pehin Orang Kaya Pekerma Sura Pahlawan Haji Awang Abdul Manan bin Awang Mohammad
Pehin Orang Kaya Seri Setia	Manteri 32 or Manteri Pengalasan Damit	Vacant	Yang Dimuliakan Pehin Orang Kaya Seri Setia Dato Paduka Haji Awang Muhammad Yusuf bin Awang Muhammad Tahir
Pehin Datu Penglima	Manteri Tambahan di Bawah Manteri 32	Yang Dimuliakan Pehin Datu Penglima Colonel (R) Dato Paduka Haji Abdul Jalil bin Haji Ahmad	Yang Dimuliakan Pehin Datu Penglima Haji Awang Abu Bakar bin Awang Jambol
Pehin Datu Inderasugara	Manteri Tambahan di Bawah Manteri 32	Yang Dimuliakan Pehin Datu Inderasugara Brigadier General (R) Dato Paduka Awang Haji Mohd. Yusof bin Abu Bakar	Yang Dimuliakan Pehin Datu Inderasugara Dato Seri Laila Jasa Awang Hj Johari bin Abdul Razak
Pehin Datu Dermajasa	Manteri Tambahan di Bawah Manteri 32	Vacant	Yang Dimuliakan Pehin Datu Dermajasa Dato Hamzah Pahlawan Awang Haji Metali bin Osman
Pehin Datu Singamenteri	Manteri Tambahan di Bawah Manteri 32	Yang Dimuliakan Pehin Datu Singamanteri Colonel (R) Dato Seri Setia (Dr.) Awang Haji Mohd. Yasmin bin Haji Umar	Yang Dimuliakan Pehin Datu Singamenteri Ariff bin Mujun
Pehin Orang Kaya Datu Indera Setia Diraja	Manteri Tambahan di Bawah Manteri 32	Yang Dimuliakan Pehin Orang Kaya Datu Indera Setia Diraja Brigadier General (R) Dato Paduka Awang Haji Abdul Aziz bin Orang Kaya Kaya Datu Abdullah	Office established
Pehin Datu Maharajalela	Manteri Tambahan di Bawah Manteri 32	Yang Dimuliakan Pehin Datu Maharajalela Lieutenant Colonel (R) Dato Seri Laila Jasa Awang Haji Musa bin Haji Ya'akub	Office established
Pehin Datu Harimaupadang	Manteri Tambahan di Bawah Manteri 32	Yang Dimuliakan Pehin Datu Harimaupadang Major General (R) Dato Paduka Seri Awang Haji Husin bin Ahmad	Office established
Pehin Datu Juragan Laila Diraja	Manteri Tambahan di Bawah Manteri 32	Yang Dimuliakan Pehin Datu Juragan Laila Diraja Colonel (R) Dato Seri Pahlawan Awang Haji Kefli bin Orang Kaya Laila Setia Haji Razali	Office established
Pehin Datu Pekerma Bijaya	Manteri Tambahan di Bawah Manteri 32	Yang Dimuliakan Pehin Datu Pekerma Bijaya Colonel (R) Dato Paduka Awang Haji Hussin bin Haji Sulaiman	Office established
Pehin Datu Laksamana	Manteri Tambahan di Bawah Manteri 32	Yang Dimuliakan Pehin Datu Laksamana Dato Paduka Awang Haji Abdul Latif bin Haji Abdul Ghafar	Office established
Pehin Datu Indera Negara	Manteri Tambahan di Bawah Manteri 32	Yang Dimuliakan Pehin Datu Indera Negara Lieutenant Colonel (R) Dato Paduka Awang Haji Mohd. Ariffin bin Dato Paduka Haji Abdul Wahab	Office established
Pehin Datu Indera Setia	Manteri Tambahan di Bawah Manteri 32	Vacant	Yang Dimuliakan Pehin Datu Indera Setia Major General (R) Dato Paduka Seri Haji Awang Sulaiman bin Haji Awang Damit
Pehin Datu Dermasakti	Manteri Tambahan di Bawah Manteri 32	Yang Dimuliakan Pehin Datu Dermasakti Dato Paduka Awang Haji Abdul Razak bin Abdullah	Office established
Pehin Datu Padukaraja	Manteri Tambahan di Bawah Manteri 32	Yang Dimuliakan Pehin Datu Padukaraja Major General (R) Dato Paduka Seri Awang Haji Shari bin Ahmad	Office established
Pehin Datu Kesuma Diraja	Manteri Tambahan di Bawah Manteri 32	Vacant	Yang Dimuliakan Pehin Datu Kesuma Diraja Colonel (R) Awang Haji Abdul Rahman bin Mustapha
Pehin Datu Pekerma Dewa	Manteri Tambahan di Bawah Manteri 32	Vacant	Yang Dimuliakan Pehin Datu Pekerma Dewa Awang Haji Muhd Ali bin Abdullah Hitam
Pehin Datu Lailaraja	Manteri Tambahan di Bawah Manteri 32	Yang Berhormat Pehin Datu Lailaraja Major General (R) Dato Paduka Seri Haji Awang Halbi bin Haji Mohammad Yusof	Yang Dimuliakan Pehin Datu Lailaraja Awang Haji Abu Bakar bin Baha
Pehin Datu Perkasa	Manteri Tambahan di Bawah Manteri 32	Vacant	Yang Dimuliakan Pehin Datu Perkasa Colonel (R) Dato Seri Laila Jasa Awang Haji Ishak bin Haji Abdul Hamid
Pehin Datu Pekerma Jaya	Manteri Tambahan di Bawah Manteri 32	Yang Dimuliakan Pehin Datu Pekerma Jaya Major General (R) Dato Paduka Seri Awang Mohammad Tawih bin Abdullah	Yang Dimuliakan Pehin Datu Pekerma Jaya Haji Mohammad Yussof bin Mohammad Said
Pehin Datu Kerma Setia	Manteri Tambahan di Bawah Manteri 32	Yang Dimuliakan Pehin Datu Kerma Setia Dato Paduka Seri Awang Zainuddin bin Jalani	Yang Dimuliakan Pehin Datu Kerma Setia Major (R) Dato Seri Laila Jasa Awang Mohammad Don bin Haji Abdul Latif
Pehin Datu Bendahara	Manteri Tambahan di Bawah Manteri 32	Yang Dimuliakan Pehin Datu Bendahara Lieutenant Colonel (R) Awang Sari bin Ahmad	Office established
Pehin Manteri Bini	Manteri (Dalam) Istana	Yang Dimuliakan Pehin Manteri Bini Datin Paduka Dayang Hajah Aminah binti Haji Yassin	Unknown
Pehin Jawatan Bini	Manteri (Dalam) Istana	Yang Dimuliakan Pehin Jawatan Bini Datin Paduka Dayang Hajah Siti binti Haji Mohammad Yusof Khan	Unknown
Pehin Manda Bini	Manteri (Dalam) Istana	Vacant	Yang Dimuliakan Pehin Manda Bini Kawang Limah binti Awang Besar
Seri Laila Pengiring Diraja	Manteri (Dalam) Istana	Yang Dimuliakan Seri Laila Pengiring Diraja Datin Seri Utama Dayang Hajah Rosnah binti Abdullah	Unknown
Pehin Orang Kaya Jurulateh Adat Istiadat Diraja	Manteri (Dalam) Istana	Yang Dimuliakan Pehin Orang Kaya Jurulateh Adat Istiadat Diraja Dato Paduka Haji Awang Mashhor bin Haji Awang Metahir	Yang Dimuliakan Pehin Orang Kaya Jurulateh Adat Istiadat Diraja Haji Awang Hussain bin Pehin Penyurat Awang Matseruddin
Pehin Penyurat	Manteri (Dalam) Istana	Yang Dimuliakan Pehin Penyurat Awang Maidin bin Begawan Pehin Siraja Khatib Dato Paduka Seri Setia Haji Awang Abdul Hamid	Yang Dimuliakan Pehin Penyurat Haji Awang Mashhor bin Haji Awang Metahir
Pehin Penyurat	Manteri (Dalam) Istana	Yang Dimuliakan Pehin Penyurat Haji Awang Osman bin Begawan Pehin Khatib Dato Paduka Haji Awang Mohammad Said	Unknown
Pehin Penyurat	Manteri (Dalam) Istana	Vacant	Yang Dimuliakan Pehin Penyurat Haji Awang Ahmad bin Pehin Jawatan Dalam Haji Awang Mohd Yusof
Pehin Penyurat	Manteri (Dalam) Istana	Vacant	Unknown
Pehin Bendahari	Manteri (Dalam) Istana	Yang Dimuliakan Pehin Bendahari Haji Awang Abu Bakar bin Pehin Orang Kaya Udana Laila Dato Paduka Haji Awang Umar	Unknown
Pehin Bendahari	Manteri (Dalam) Istana	Vacant	Yang Dimuliakan Pehin Bendahari Awang Maidin bin Begawan Pehin Siraja Khatib Dato Paduka Seri Setia Haji Awang Abdul Hamid
Pehin Bendahari	Manteri (Dalam) Istana	Vacant	Unknown
Pehin Bendahari	Manteri (Dalam) Istana	Vacant	Unknown
Pehin Orang Kaya Perbendaharaan Diraja	Manteri (Dalam) Istana	Vacant	Yang Dimuliakan Pehin Orang Kaya Perbendaharaan Diraja (Begawan Pehin Khatib) Dato Seri Setia Haji Awang Ali Hussain bin Pehin Khatib Awang Mohammad
Dayang-Dayang Diraja	Manteri (Dalam) Istana	Vacant	Unknown

=== Manteri Bertauliah ===
The list of Manteri Bertauliah below is as of 6 September 2022.

Title	Manteri	Incumbent
Mudim	Mudim (Note: The religious aristocratic titles known as "Begawan Mudim" are bestowed upon office holders of the Mudim group upon their retirement from public service at the age of 55.)	Vacant
Mudim	Mudim	Vacant
Mudim	Mudim	Vacant
Mudim	Mudim	Vacant
Mudim	Mudim	Vacant
Mudim	Mudim	Vacant
Mudim	Mudim	Vacant
Mudim	Mudim	Vacant
Begawan Mudim	Mudim	Yang Mulia Begawan Mudim Awang Haji Mat Salleh bin Haji Damit
Begawan Mudim	Mudim	Yang Mulia Begawan Mudim Awang Haji Amran bin Haji Md. Salleh
Begawan Mudim	Mudim	Yang Mulia Begawan Mudim Awang Haji Suhaili bin Haji Kalong
Begawan Mudim	Mudim	Yang Mulia Begawan Mudim Awang Haji Abdul Latif bin Haji Saman
Begawan Mudim	Mudim	Yang Mulia Begawan Mudim Awang Haji Safar @ Kifley bin Haji Laji
Begawan Mudim	Mudim	Yang Mulia Begawan Mudim Awang Haji Ahmad Kasra bin Haji Ibrahim
Begawan Mudim	Mudim	Yang Mulia Begawan Mudim Awang Haji Tamin bin Haji Putting
Panglima Diraja	Panglima	Yang Mulia Panglima Diraja Dato' Paduka Awang Haji Abdul Rashid bin Haji Ibrahim
Panglima Diraja	Panglima	Yang Mulia Panglima Diraja Awang Rinair Rupiaán bin Awang Tajudin
Panglima Asgar	Panglima	Yang Mulia Panglima Asgar Sergeant Awang Abdul Rashid bin Metarsad
Perwira Diraja	Perwira	Yang Mulia Perwira Diraja Awang Haji Abdul Hamid bin Haji Mohd. Salleh
Perwira Diraja	Perwira	Yang Mulia Perwira Diraja Awang Haji Sahmbari bin Haji Lias
Perwira Asgar	Perwira	Yang Mulia Perwira Asgar Awang Haji Abdullah bin Unin
Perwira Asgar	Perwira	Yang Mulia Perwira Asgar Corporal Awang Mohamad Badarudin bin Haji Mohd. Sofian
Hulubalang Diraja	Hulubalang	Yang Mulia Hulubalang Diraja Awang Lundin bin Salleh
Hulubalang Diraja	Hulubalang	Yang Mulia Hulubalang Diraja Awang Mohamad Arfandey bin Abu Bakar
Hulubalang Asgar	Hulubalang	Yang Mulia Hulubalang Asgar Awang Ahmad bin Haji Masri
Hulubalang Asgar	Hulubalang	Yang Mulia Hulubalang Asgar Corporal Awang Abdul Malik bin Awang Hidup
Pahlawan	Pahlawan	Vacant
Pahlawan	Pahlawan	Vacant
Pateh	Pateh	Vacant
Damong	Damong	Vacant
Pengarah Mukim	Pengarah	Vacant
Pengarah Digadong	Pengarah	Vacant
Pengarah	Pengarah	Yang Mulia Pengarah Awang Jaini bin Haji Mahmud
Pengarah	Pengarah	Yang Mulia Pengarah Awang Haji Abdul Rahman bin Haji Naim
Pengarah	Pengarah	Yang Mulia Pengarah Awang Haji Abdullah Sunny bin Haji Bakar
Pengarah	Pengarah	Yang Mulia Pengarah Awang Haji Kilali bin Haji Abd. Rahman
Pengarah	Pengarah	Yang Mulia Pengarah Haji Awang Abdullah bin Pehin Orang Kaya Perbendaharaan Diraja (Begawan Pehin Khatib) Dato Seri Setia Haji Awang Ali Hussein
Pengarah	Pengarah	Yang Mulia Pengarah Awang Haji Brahim @ Momin bin Haji Mohd. Yusof
Pengarah	Pengarah	Vacant
Pengarah	Pengarah	Vacant
Janang	Janang	Vacant
Malek	Malek	Vacant
Ketua Juru Laki	Ketua Juru Laki	Vacant
Juru Laki	Juru Laki	Yang Mulia Juru Laki Awang Haji Johan Areffen bin Hassan
Juru Laki	Juru Laki	Vacant
Juru Bini	Juru Bini	Yang Mulia Juru Bini Dayang Hajah Rokiah binti Panglima Diraja Dato Paduka Haji Mohiddin
Orang Kaya Besar	Kepala Manteri Pendalaman	Vacant
Orang Kaya Harimau Padang	Kepala Manteri Pendalaman	Vacant
Orang Kaya Laila Perkasa	Kepala Manteri Pendalaman	Vacant
Orang Kaya Setia Bakti	Kepala Manteri Pendalaman	Vacant
Orang Kaya Perkasa Setia Diraja	Manteri Pendalaman atau Manteri Darat	Vacant
Orang Kaya Seri Pahlawan	Manteri Pendalaman atau Manteri Darat	Vacant
Datu Setiawan	Manteri Pendalaman atau Manteri Darat	Vacant
Datu Seri Paduka Tuan	Manteri Pendalaman atau Manteri Darat	Vacant
Datu Ratna	Manteri Pendalaman atau Manteri Darat	Vacant
Datu Kerna	Manteri Pendalaman atau Manteri Darat	Vacant
Datu Mahawangsa	Manteri Pendalaman atau Manteri Darat	Vacant
Datu Seri Laila	Manteri Pendalaman atau Manteri Darat	Vacant
Datu Panglima	Manteri Pendalaman atau Manteri Darat	Vacant
Pengarah	Manteri Pendalaman atau Manteri Darat	Vacant
Orang Kaya Kesuma	Manteri Pendalaman atau Manteri Darat	Yang Mulia Orang Kaya Kesuma Awang Haji Md. Yunos bin Haji Kamis
Orang Kaya Bandar	Manteri Pendalaman atau Manteri Darat	Vacant
Datu Harimau Alam	Manteri Pendalaman atau Manteri Darat	Vacant
Orang Kaya Laila Negara	Manteri Pendalaman atau Manteri Darat	Vacant
Orang Kaya Maharaja Dinda	Manteri Pendalaman atau Manteri Darat	Vacant
Datu Derma Wijaya	Manteri Pendalaman atau Manteri Darat	Vacant
Orang Kaya Bendahara	Manteri Pendalaman atau Manteri Darat	Vacant
Orang Kaya Paduka Setia Diraja	Manteri Pendalaman atau Manteri Darat	Vacant
Orang Kaya Pemancha	Manteri Pendalaman atau Manteri Darat	Vacant
Orang Kaya Dewa Setia Diraja	Manteri Pendalaman atau Manteri Darat	Vacant
Orang Kaya Rimba	Manteri Pendalaman atau Manteri Darat	Vacant
Datu Maharaja Setia	Manteri Pendalaman atau Manteri Darat	Vacant
Orang Kaya Seri Ratna	Manteri Pendalaman atau Manteri Darat	Vacant
Orang Kaya Indera Perkasa	Manteri Pendalaman atau Manteri Darat	Vacant
Orang Kaya Setia Laila	Manteri Pendalaman atau Manteri Darat	Vacant
Orang Kaya Laila Setia	Manteri Pendalaman atau Manteri Darat	Vacant
Penyurat	Manteri Pendalaman atau Manteri Darat	Vacant
Orang Kaya Setia Negara	Manteri Pendalaman atau Manteri Darat	Vacant
Orang Kaya Jaya Putera	Manteri Pendalaman atau Manteri Darat	Yang Mulia Orang Kaya Jaya Putera Dato Paduka Awang Haji Mohd. Taha bin Abd Rauf
Datu Lela Raja	Manteri Pendalaman atau Manteri Darat	Vacant
Orang Kaya Ali Wanika	Manteri Pendalaman atau Manteri Darat	Vacant
Datu Setia Diraja	Manteri Pendalaman atau Manteri Darat	Vacant
Orang Kaya Seri Dewa	Manteri Pendalaman atau Manteri Darat	Vacant
Datu Laila Diraja	Manteri Pendalaman atau Manteri Darat	Vacant
Datu Kornia Diraja	Manteri Pendalaman atau Manteri Darat	Vacant
Orang Kaya Perwira (Periwara)	Manteri Pendalaman atau Manteri Darat	Yang Mulia Orang Kaya Periwara Awang Harun bin Abdullah @ Orang Kaya Setia Garisau Masing
Orang Kaya Seri Bijaya	Manteri Pendalaman atau Manteri Darat	Vacant
Orang Kaya Maha Bijaya	Manteri Pendalaman atau Manteri Darat	Yang Mulia Orang Kaya Maha Bijaya Awang Haji Othman bin Uking
Orang Kaya Pekerma Indera	Manteri Pendalaman atau Manteri Darat	Vacant
Bendahari	Manteri Pendalaman atau Manteri Darat	Vacant
Orang Kaya Dewa	Manteri Pendalaman atau Manteri Darat	Vacant
Orang Kaya Pekerma Dewa	Manteri Pendalaman atau Manteri Darat	Vacant
Orang Kaya Seri Utama	Manteri Pendalaman atau Manteri Darat	Vacant
Datu Hulubalang	Manteri Pendalaman atau Manteri Darat	Vacant
Orang Kaya Temanggong	Manteri Pendalaman atau Manteri Darat	Vacant
Datu Maharaja Lela	Manteri Pendalaman atau Manteri Darat	Vacant
Orang Kaya Muda	Manteri Pendalaman atau Manteri Darat	Vacant
Orang Kaya Sura	Manteri Pendalaman atau Manteri Darat	Vacant
Orang Kaya Seri Dana	Manteri Pendalaman atau Manteri Darat	Vacant
Orang Kaya Garisau	Manteri Pendalaman atau Manteri Darat	Vacant
Orang Kaya Kaya	Manteri Pendalaman atau Manteri Darat	Yang Mulia Orang Kaya Kaya Awang Haji Nordin bin Haji Arsad
Orang Kaya Maharaja Lela	Manteri Pendalaman atau Manteri Darat	Vacant
Orang Kaya Setia	Manteri Pendalaman atau Manteri Darat	Yang Mulia Orang Kaya Setia Awang Haji Ahmad bin Haji Lakim
Orang Kaya Harimau Sultan	Manteri Pendalaman atau Manteri Darat	Vacant
Orang Kaya Harimau Alam	Manteri Pendalaman atau Manteri Darat	Vacant
Orang Kaya Harimau Kumbang	Manteri Pendalaman atau Manteri Darat	Vacant
Orang Kaya Machan Kambing	Manteri Pendalaman atau Manteri Darat	Vacant
Orang Kaya Singa Naga Laila	Manteri Pendalaman atau Manteri Darat	Vacant
Orang Kaya Singa Pahlawan	Manteri Pendalaman atau Manteri Darat	Vacant
Orang Kaya Gulanggi Alam	Manteri Pendalaman atau Manteri Darat	Vacant
Orang Kaya Sandar Sumandar	Manteri Pendalaman atau Manteri Darat	Vacant
Orang Kaya Megat Diraja	Manteri Pendalaman atau Manteri Darat	Vacant
Orang Kaya Indera Kala	Manteri Pendalaman atau Manteri Darat	Vacant
Orang Kaya Sura Laila	Manteri Pendalaman atau Manteri Darat	Vacant
Orang Kaya Laila Perwira	Manteri Pendalaman atau Manteri Darat	Vacant
Orang Kaya Sang Bijaya Setia	Manteri Pendalaman atau Manteri Darat	Vacant
Orang Kaya Gampar Alam	Manteri Pendalaman atau Manteri Darat	Vacant
Orang Kaya Kandar Alam	Manteri Pendalaman atau Manteri Darat	Vacant
Orang Kaya Indera Muda	Manteri Pendalaman atau Manteri Darat	Vacant
Orang Kaya Gerha Diraja	Manteri Pendalaman atau Manteri Darat	Vacant
Orang Kaya Seri Sikandi Maharaja	Manteri Pendalaman atau Manteri Darat	Vacant
Orang Kaya Seri Jati	Manteri Pendalaman atau Manteri Darat	Vacant
Orang Kaya Chendera Jati	Manteri Pendalaman atau Manteri Darat	Vacant
Orang Kaya Bala Bandar	Manteri Pendalaman atau Manteri Darat	Vacant
Orang Kaya Penglima Sultan	Manteri Pendalaman atau Manteri Darat	Vacant
Orang Kaya Singamenteri	Manteri Pendalaman atau Manteri Darat	Vacant

== See also ==
- Cheteria
- Wazir
- Council of Cabinet Ministers
