= Kampong Tanjong Maya =

Kampong Tanjong Maya Kampung Tanjong Maya
- Village
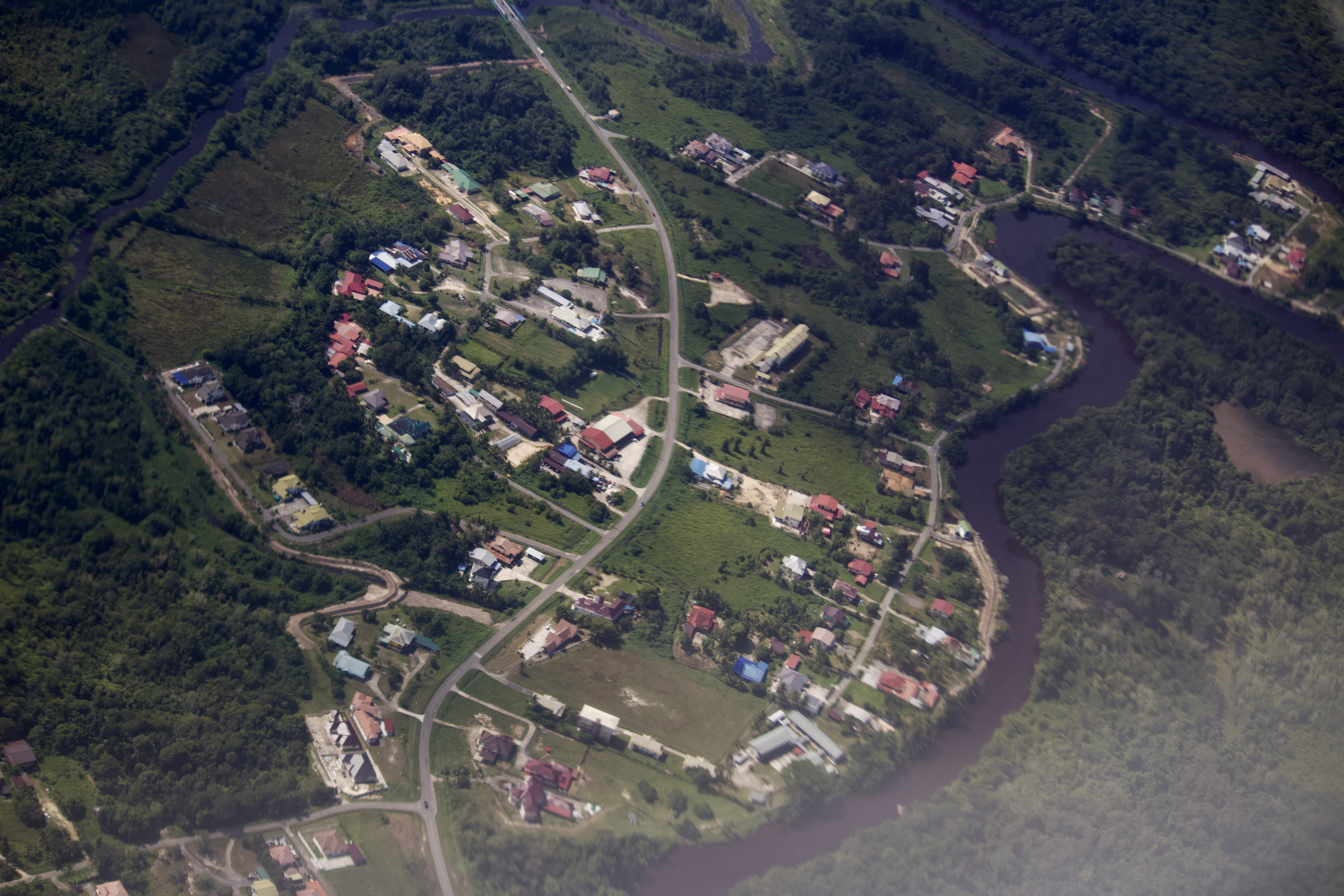
- An aerial view of the village, divided by Jalan Tanjong Maya

- Location in Brunei
- Coordinates: 4°44′56″N 114°39′55″E
- Country: Brunei
- District: Tutong
- Mukim: Tanjong Maya
- First settled: 18th century
- Founder: Bendahari Talip Ali

Government
  - Village head: Nur Azmil Ismail

Population (2021)
  - Total: 253
- Time zone: UTC+8 (BNT)
- Postcode: TD1141

Kampong Tanjong Maya (Malay: Kampung Tanjong Maya) is a village located in the Tutong District of Brunei, within the mukim of Tanjong Maya, and has the postcode TA1941. Located approximately 12 kilometres (7.5 mi) from Tutong town, the village borders Kampong Bukit Udal, Penapar, and Lubok Pulau. With a population of 488 in 2016, the majority of its residents belong to the Tutong ethnic group.

== Etymology ==
Kampong Tanjong Maya has an interesting story behind the origin of its name. Before it became known as Tanjong Maya, the village was simply called Pengkalan Ipa. It was later renamed after a ditch was constructed in the village. The idea to build the ditch came from Bendahari Talip Ali, the ketua Kampong (village head) at the time, who suggested it as a shortcut for the village, since the existing river, which was the main route for the villagers, was long and winding. Once the villagers agreed to the proposal, they worked together to build the ditch. Eventually, they managed to construct a ditch about 5 chains (330 ft; 100 m) long and 6 feet (1.8 m) wide, creating a small stream. With the construction of the ditch, the villagers were able to shorten their journey without needing to use the river.

During the construction, the villagers invited the Dusun people who lived nearby to join in. Initially, the Dusun agreed to participate, but over time, they became concerned that the completion of the ditch would make it easier for the Tutong people to fight them. Because of this fear, the Dusun people eventually refused to take part in the construction. Their refusal was expressed with the words "inde ku maya," meaning "I do not follow." From this phrase, the village was initially named Kampong Inde Ku Maya. However, as the name was not considered pleasant to hear, Bendahari Talip Ali suggested changing it to Kampong Tanjong Maya.

== History ==
The early history of Kampong Tanjong Maya dates back around 300 years from 2002, when several families from the Tutong people, originally living in Kampong Lurah Saban along the Tutong River, migrated to explore new lands for rice farming. This migration was led by Bendahari Talip Ali bin Bendahari Tengah, following the abduction of his son's wife by a shape-shifting tiger. This incident prompted the family to leave their hometown and move inland along the river in search of safer areas to cultivate crops, such as rice, and hunt animals. Their migration marked a new chapter for the Tutong people, who had previously lived in villages along the riverbanks.

Before settling in Kampong Tanjong Maya, they initially lived in two areas along the river leading to the village: Ngorbuat (Sungai Panjang), followed by a move to Nyumbung (Tanjong Panjang). Driven by a desire to find more suitable land for living, they eventually moved to a place called Pengkalan Ipa, which was ideal for hunting and observing potential threats. Some families, however, chose to remain in the two original locations. The migration to Pengkalan Ipa led to peaceful coexistence with the Dusun people from the Penalud, Bukit Nibong, and Bala An areas, with some members of the Bendahari family marrying into the Dusun tribe.

When life in Pengkalan Ipa was deemed suitable for settlement, they decided to stay. The area eventually became known as Kampong Tanjong Maya. Initially, the settlers constructed a longhouse, with separate sections for each family. This longhouse lifestyle, which had been a tradition since their time in Lurah Saban, provided a sense of safety from the threat of ayau (headhunting), which was common at the time.

== Administration ==
The position of village head in Kampong Tanjong Maya has existed unofficially since the village was founded by Bendahari Talip Ali. He was appointed by the villagers to lead them, given his position as a prominent figure in Brunei, supported by his noble title.

As this title was passed down through the generations of Bendahari Talip Ali's family, the role of village head continued to be held by his descendants for several generations. Among them was his son, Dato Arshad, who became the second village head. He was succeeded by Bendahari Yaa bin Dato Arshad, then by his younger brother Penyurat Ismail bin Dato Arshad, followed by his son-in-law, Datu Di-Gadong Abdul Rahman bin Dato Arshad, who hailed from Kampong Panchor Papan. After this, the position of village head was no longer held solely by the descendants of Bendahari Talip Ali.

From the 1880s to 1939, the position of village head and penghulu of Mukim Tanjong Maya was held by Abdul Rashid bin Salleh, whose father came from Kampong Lurong Sekuna, and his mother was from Kampong Tanjong Maya. His son, Pulong bin Abdul Rashid, then took over as village head from 1939 to 1946, followed by Orang Kaya Pekerma Indera Haji Layeh bin Tangah from 1946 to 1955. The role of village head returned to the family of Bendahari Talip Ali when Bendahari Haji Ghafar bin Haji Sidi assumed the position from 1956 to 1974.

After him, the position was taken over by Haji Md. Yassin bin Abdullah, a descendant of Sambas, who served as village head and penghulu of Mukim Tanjong Maya from 1975 to 1982. Due to the significant responsibilities of both the penghulu of mukim and village head, which were then under the jurisdiction of Kampong Lubok Pulau, Datu Lela Raja Haji Md. Jair bin Bendahari Haji Ghafar was appointed village head in 1977. In 1983, Datu Lela Raja Haji Md. Jair bin Bendahari Haji Ghafar became the penghulu of Mukim Tanjong Maya, and the position of village head was handed over to Haji Shuib bin Md. Yussof in 1992, a role he still holds as of 2002.

== Infrastructure ==
=== Education ===
Recognising the importance of education for the village's residents, one of the key objectives during the leadership of Haji Abdul Rashid bin Salleh, penghulu of Kampung Tanjong Maya, was to establish a school in the village. Following discussions and approval from the villagers, a school was built in 1928, named Abdul Rashid Primary School. The construction of the school was carried out through a gotong-royong effort led by Penghulu Abdul Rashid on land he had donated. The site was located at Bukit Penulod, Kampong Tanjong Maya, approximately 10 chains (660 ft; 200 m) from the river and near his residence. The school building measured 60 by 20 feet (18.3 m × 6.1 m) and stood 4 feet high.

The school officially opened on 20 March 1930 with 42 students in first grade. Idris bin Hamzah, who came from Kampong Panchor Papan, was appointed as the first headmaster. The school continued to serve the village until 1956, when a new school building was constructed to meet the growing educational needs of the community.

=== Religion ===
Islam spread rapidly in Kampung Tanjong Maya, thanks in large part to the efforts of Muslim travellers. One of the key figures was Haji Ahmad, also known as Haji Ahmad Sagun, from Taif, Saudi Arabia. In the 1880s, he constructed a small mosque, or surau, in the village. This mosque was the first in the area and the second in the Tutong District. Located in the village centre, it served as a place for worship, religious teachings, and Quranic studies.

As the village grew, so did the need for more mosques. In 1907, a second mosque was built in Kuala Parit, Tanjong Maya, through a gotong-royong effort led by Haji Ahmad from Mukah and Pengaran Haji Othman bin Pengiran Manai, who was later appointed imam by the villagers. A third mosque was constructed in 1920 at Bukit Penulod, funded by a land donation from Penghulu Abdul Rashid bin Mohd Salleh. Imam Haji Ismail bin Adam served as the first imam until his passing.

In 1936, a fourth mosque was built on land owned by Bendahari Haji Abdul Ghafar bin Haji Sidi and his siblings in Kampong Meranti. This relocation was necessary to accommodate the growing population of Tanjong Maya and was agreed upon by Penghulu Abdul Rashid. The construction was led by Abdul Samad bin Haji Sidi. After Imam Haji Ismail's passing, Imam Haji Md Said bin Ahmad succeeded him, appointed by the government of Sultan Omar Ali Saifuddien III. Upon Imam Md Said's retirement, Haji Md Yassin bin Haji Hassan, previously the bilal, took over as imam.

The fifth mosque, now known as Kampung Tanjong Maya Mosque, was constructed in 1972. The foundation stone was laid by Pengiran Dato Paduka Othman bin Pengiran Anak Md Salleh, the Tutong District Officer. Funded by the villagers with a government contribution of B$523,000, the mosque cost $42,000 to build, excluding the expenses for the site and surrounding area. The mosque, which accommodates about 250 worshippers, was officially opened by Sultan Hassanal Bolkiah on 6 July 1973. In June 1984, the mosque underwent renovations, with an additional $250,000 funding from the government, increasing its capacity to 400 worshippers. The upgraded mosque also included new facilities, such as a hall and library.
