= Mukim Tanjong Maya =

Mukim of Brunei

- Mukim
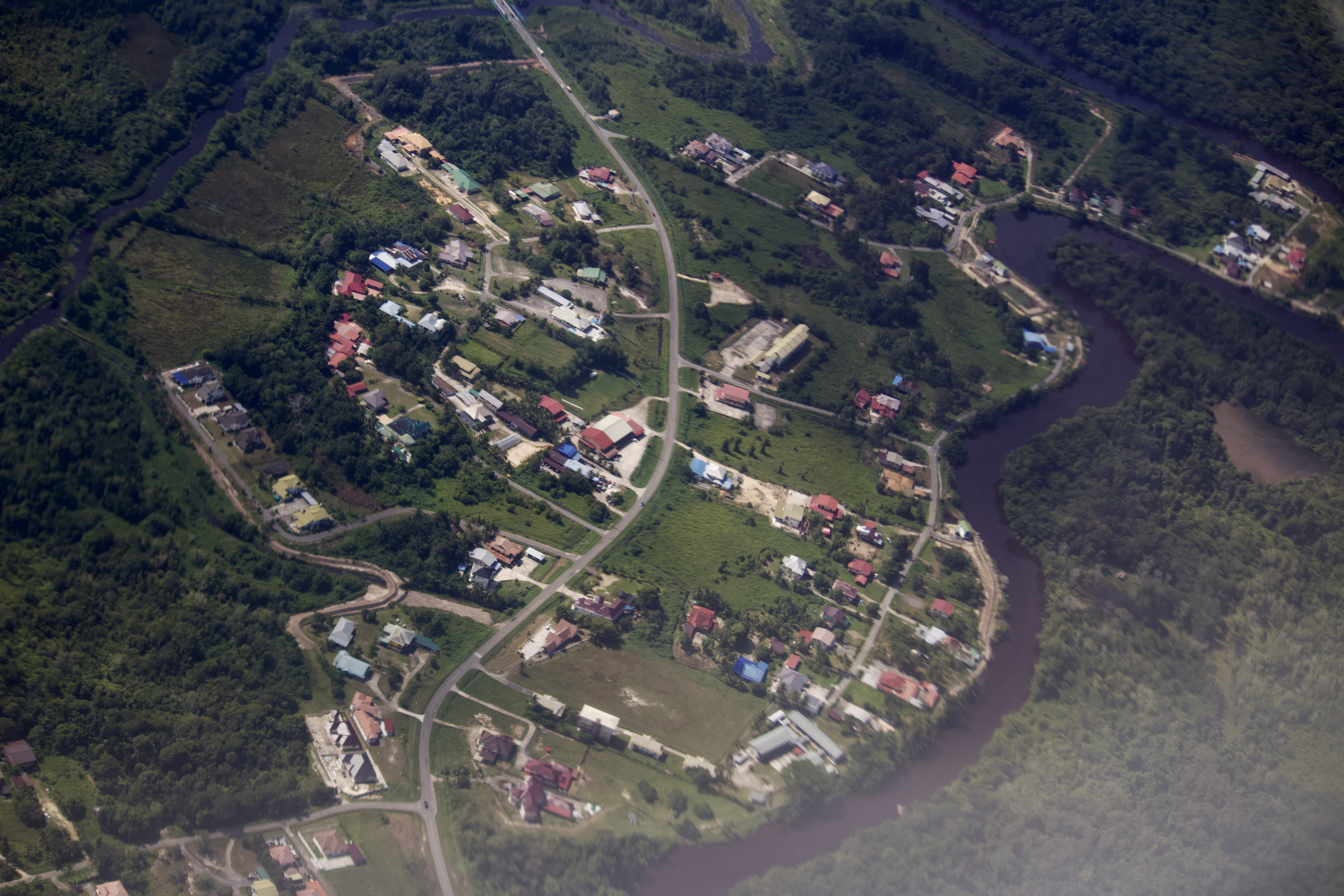
- Kampong Lubok Pulau alongside Tutong River

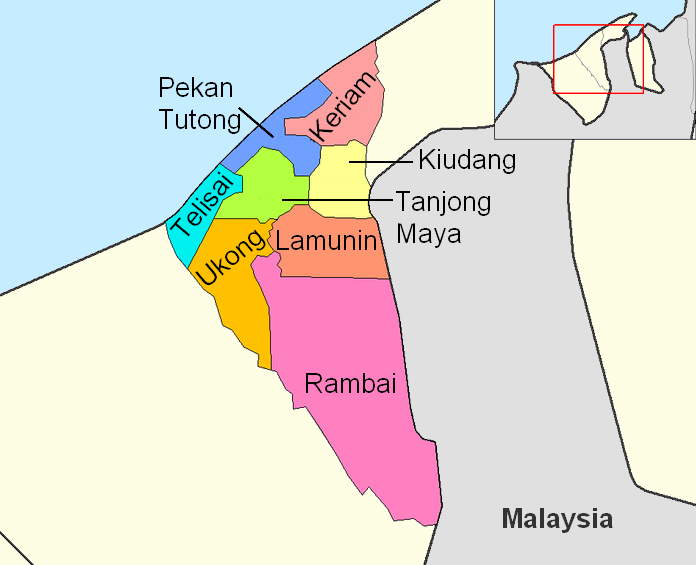
- Tanjong Maya is in green.
- Coordinates: 4°46′N 114°40′E
- Country: Brunei
- District: Tutong

Government
  - Penghulu: Mohammad Azaman Shah

Population (2021)
  - Total: 3,772
- Time zone: UTC+8 (BNT)
- Postcode: TDxx41

Mukim Tanjong Maya is a mukim in Tutong District, Brunei. The population was 4,062 in 2016.

== Etymology ==
The village was only known as Pengkalan Ipa and changed to Tanjong Maya after the construction of a ditch in the village. The construction of the ditch was on the recommendation of Bendahari Talip Ali who was the ketua kampong at that time to be used as a shortcut in the village, because the existing river which was the main road for the villagers was so long and convoluted. When the proposal was approved by the villagers, they agreed to build the ditch in a cooperative manner. Finally they managed to build a ditch about five chains long and about 6 feet (1.8 m) wide that formed a creek.

With the construction of the ditch, the villagers can shorten the travel time without having to use the existing river road. In the efforts of the villagers to build the ditch, they brought the Dusun Brunei who live nearby to participate, but they refused. Their rejection was expressed by the Dusun tribe with the words 'inde ku maya' which means 'inda ku ikut'. From that word was born the name of the village which was initially named Kampong Inde Ku Maya. Since the name of Kampung 'Inde Ku Maya' is not pleasant to hear, Talip Ali suggested that the name be changed to Kampong Tanjong Maya.

== Geography ==
The mukim could be named after Kampong Tanjong Maya, one of the villages it encompasses. The mukim is located in the central north of Tutong District, bordering Mukim Pekan Tutong to the north, Mukim Kiudang to the east, Mukim Lamunin to the south-east, Mukim Ukong to the south-west and Mukim Telisai to the west. Mukim Tanjong Maya is located about 12 kilometres (7.5 mi) from Pekan Tutong. This village is bordered by Kampong Lubok Pulau, Kampong Penapar and Bukit Udal.

== Administration ==
As of 2021, the mukim comprised the following census villages:

Settlements	Population (2021)	Ketua kampung (2024)
Kampong Tanjong Panjang	253	Nur Azmil bin Haji Ismail
Kampong Lubok Pulau	484	Nur Azmil bin Haji Ismail
Kampong Bukit Sibut	200	—N/a
Kampong Liulon	150	—N/a
Kampong Tanjong Maya	530	—N/a
Kampong Bangunggos	376	—N/a
Kampong Sebakit	164	—N/a
Kampong Pemadang	30	—N/a
Kampong Penapar	395	Haji Masri bin Haji Abdullah
Kampong Bukit Udal	1,190	Haji Masri bin Haji Abdullah

== History ==
According to Penghulu Mukim Tanjong Maya, Awang Haji Abdul Wahab bin Apong, the early history of the village began approximately 300 years ago when several families from the Tutong people living in Kampong Lurah Saban located on the Tutong River moved to the village to explore or potentially a new area to grow rice. The move was led by Bendahari Talip bin Bendahara Tengah, which was after the incident of the tiger running away the bride who was the wife of Bendahari Talip's own son. The incident has prompted the family of Treasurer Talip Ali to move from his hometown to the Tutong river basin. In addition, they also want to explore new places to farm such as growing rice and hunting animals. Their move there has opened a new chapter in the life of the Tutong tribe which before that was more focused on the village on the Tutong River. The family of Bendahari Talip Ali is believed to be the earliest generation of the Tutong tribe who explored the hinterland of Tutong River and subsequently settled there.

Before they arrived at Kampong Tanjong Maya they first settled in two places along the river leading to the village, namely in an area named Ngorbuat (Sungai Panjang) and then moved again to a place called Nyumbung (Tanjong Panjang). Due to the desire to explore more suitable areas to live in they have moved to an area named Pengkalan Ipa, a place suitable for them to spy on animals and enemies. While some other families continue to reside in the two places. The relocation of Talip Ali's family to Pengkalan Ipa has succeeded in creating a harmonious life with the Dusun tribes who live in nearby areas such as Bukit Penulud, Bukit Nibong and Meranti. Talip Ali himself was married to a Dusun tribe named Yuntus (Afsah). When life there felt suitable to be used as a place to live, they continued to live there until the place was finally known as Kampong Tanjong Maya. At the beginning they just built a house in the shape of a longhouse and were given plots for each sex in the family. Living together in a longhouse is the early way of life of the Tutong people that has existed since they lived in Lurah Saban. The shape of the house is also felt to be safer to avoid the threat of ayau (head hunters) that happened at that time.

== Economy ==
Virgin coconut products are among the famous products in this mukim.

== Demography ==
As of 2016 census, the population was 4,062 with 50.3% males and 49.7% females. The mukim had 674 households occupying 667 dwellings. The entire population lived in rural areas. Almost the entire population of the village is made up of the Tutong tribe.

== Infrastructure ==
As in other mukims in the country, the mukim is not left behind to receive facilities provided by the government such as electricity, water, telephone, mosques and schools.

== Sister mukims ==
- Garut Regency, West Java, Indonesia
