= Kampong Bukit Udal =

Bukit Udal
- Village
- Kampong Bukit Udal
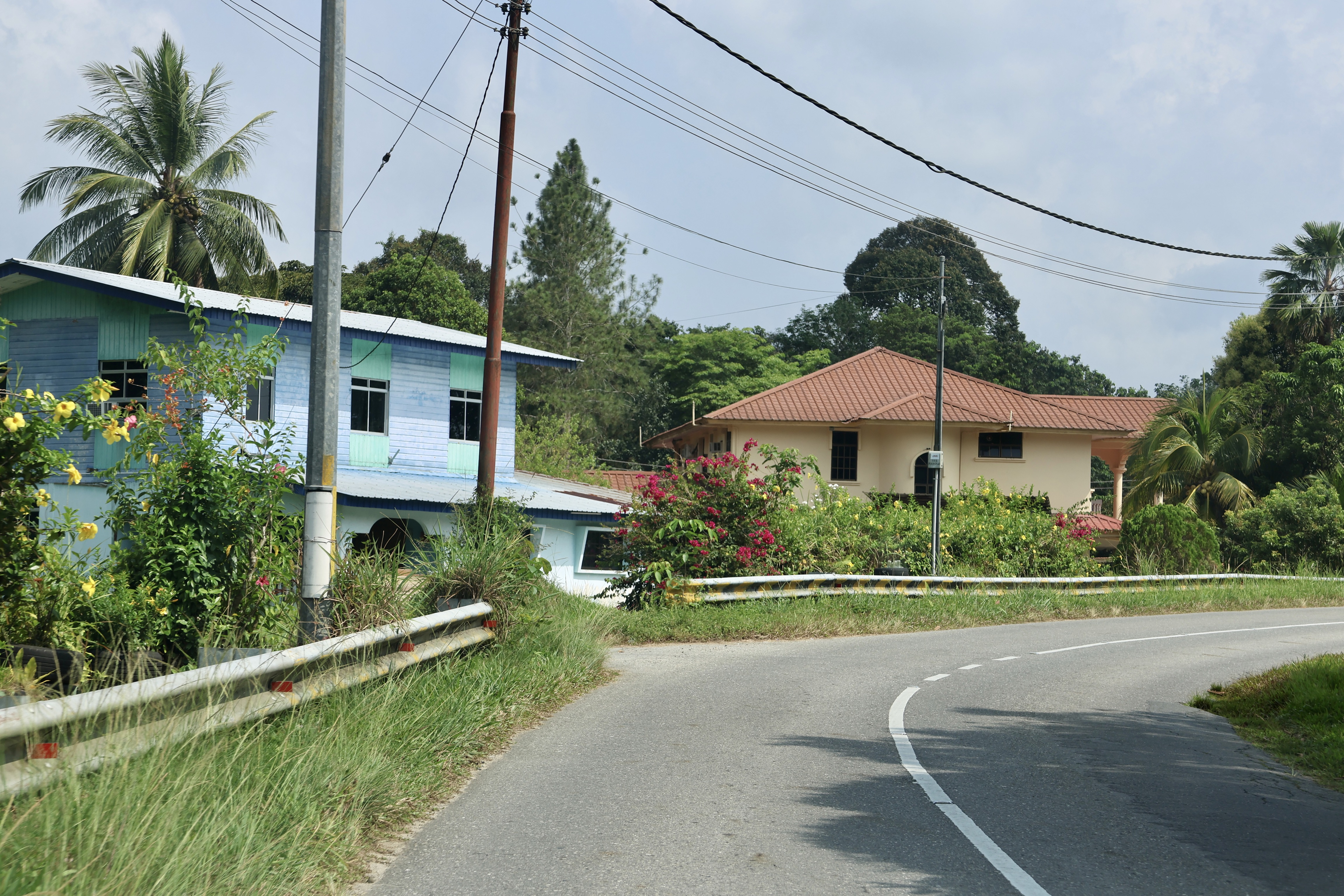

- Location in Brunei
- Coordinates: 4°43′46″N 114°39′00″E
- Country: Brunei
- District: Tutong
- Mukim: Tanjong Maya

Government
  - Village head: Masri Abdullah

Area
  - Total: 13 km^{2} (5.0 sq mi)

Population (2016)
  - Total: 1,306
  - Density: 100/km^{2} (260/sq mi)
- Time zone: UTC+8 (BNT)
- Postcode: TD2341

Kampong Bukit Udal (Malay: Kampung Bukit Udal) or simply known as Bukit Udal, is a village in Tutong District, Brunei, about 11 kilometres (6.8 mi) from the district town Pekan Tutong. It has an area of 13 square kilometres (5.0 square miles); the population was 1,306 in 2016. It is one of the villages within Mukim Tanjong Maya, a mukim in the district.

== Etymology ==
There was allegedly a significant flood in the area once called 'Labor'. 'Labor' means heavy rain that falls for months and the term used nowadays means Tsunami. This incident has had a bad impact not only on the villagers but has also destroyed plants and many animals have died. All creatures, including people with their livestocks, animals, and even insects, raced to Bukit Kukub, a high region. There was not enough food even though everything that could live was present. All the grasses were consumed, and the area was given the name Bukit Badal since the Tutong term for bald is badal. For unexplained reasons, the word Badal was changed to Dudal, and in the 1940s, Bukit Udal was given its official name. Another speculated that Kampong Bukit Badal had a name proposed for the Primary School built in the village, Awang Benson's father gave several name suggestions including Bukit Udal which was finally chosen as the name of the village until now.

== Demography ==
As of 2016, the population of this village is about 1,132 people who are made up of various races such as Malay, Chinese, Iban and others. The number of those who follow Islam is 245 people and the rest follow other religions. Most of its residents work in the government and private sectors, in addition to running their own businesses.

== Economy ==
In responding to the call of the Ministry of Home Affairs through the One Village One Product (1K1P) Program which, among other things, aims to make mukim and village communities more creative, innovative, independent, disciplined and resilient in addition to being able to create job opportunities for local residents, Majlis Perundingan Kampung (MPK) Bukit Udal has worked some village products such as ecotourism and handicraft enterprises.

== Infrastructure ==
This village has infrastructures provided by the Government of Brunei, such as road facilities, electricity supply, clean water supply, mosques, schools, public halls and others.

=== Education ===
Bukit Udal Primary School is the village primary school. It also shares grounds with Bukit Udal Religious School, the village school for the primary level of the country's Islamic religious education.

=== Places of interest ===
- Kampong Bukit Udal Mosque is the village mosque. It was built in 1995 and can accommodate 200 worshippers.
- Nak Pulau is an artistic resort park that although the area is not very wide, but covered by a variety of green plants, shrubs and bushes and fruit orchards.

== Notable people ==
- Bahrin Abdullah (born 1961), a politician and businessperson
