= Istana Pantai =

Palace in Brunei

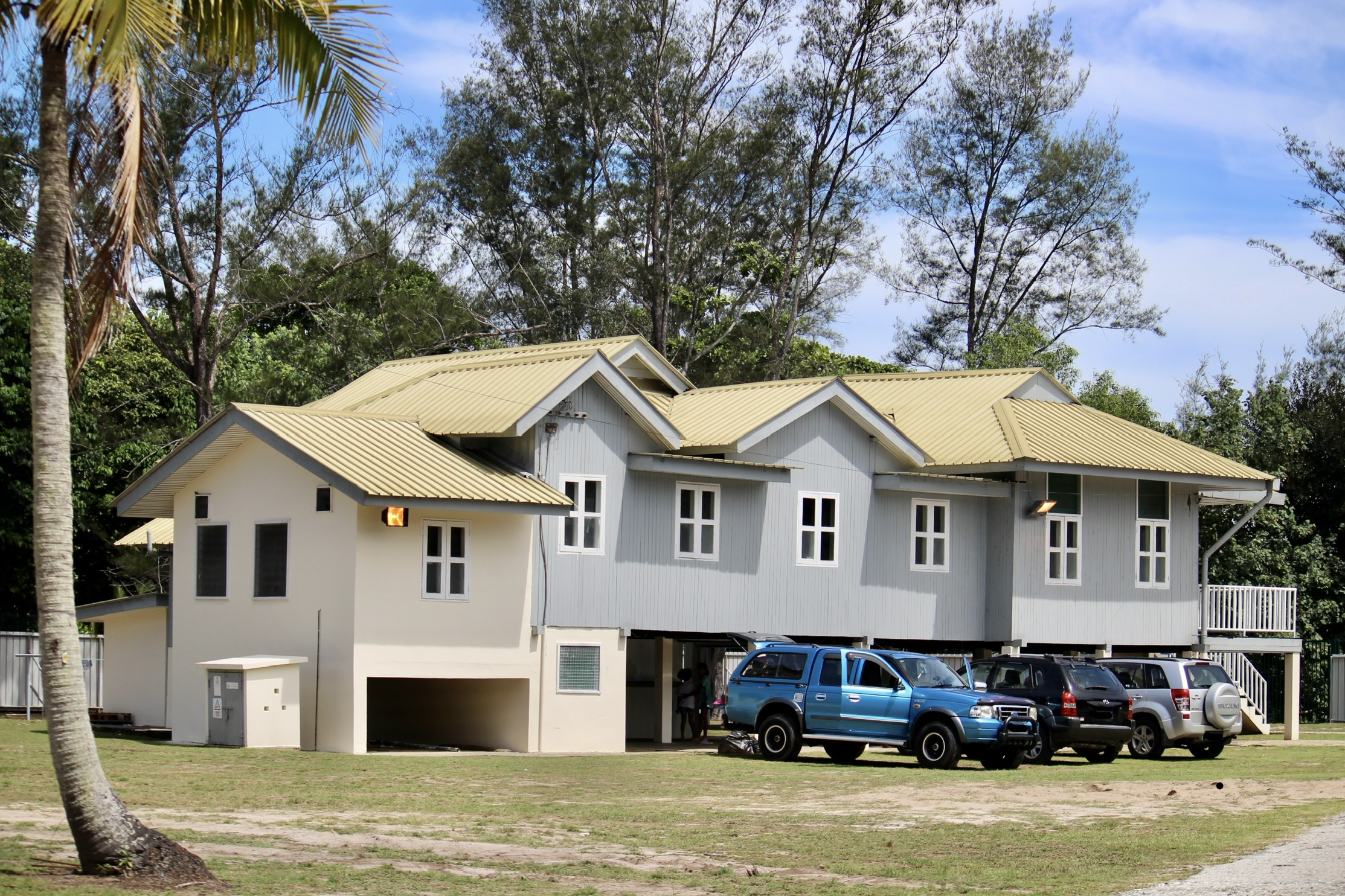
- Istana Pantai on 19 June 2022
- Interactive map of the Istana Pantai area

General information
- Type: Residence
- Architectural style: Traditional Malay
- Location: Jalan Kuala Tutong, Tutong, Brunei
- Coordinates: 4.8072519°N 114.6386104°E
- Construction started: 1950s

Technical details
- Material: wood

The Istana Pantai (English: Beach Palace) is one of the temporary official residence of the then Sultan of Brunei, Omar Ali Saifuddien III. The palace is located at Jalan Kuala Tutong, Tutong District, Brunei. Moreover, the building has become a tourist attraction and historical site in the present day.

== Design and construction ==
The palace itself is completely built from wood with most of its look preserved. The area around the palace is both facing the Seri Kenangan Beach and South China Sea, and Tutong River.

== History ==
Istana Pantai was built in 1950s and was used by then Sultan Omar Ali Saifuddien III as a seaside retreat.

== See also ==
- Politics of Brunei
- Tutong
- Istana Nurul Iman
