= Nak Pulau =

Island in Borneo

Coordinates: 4.7178513°N 114.6309577°E

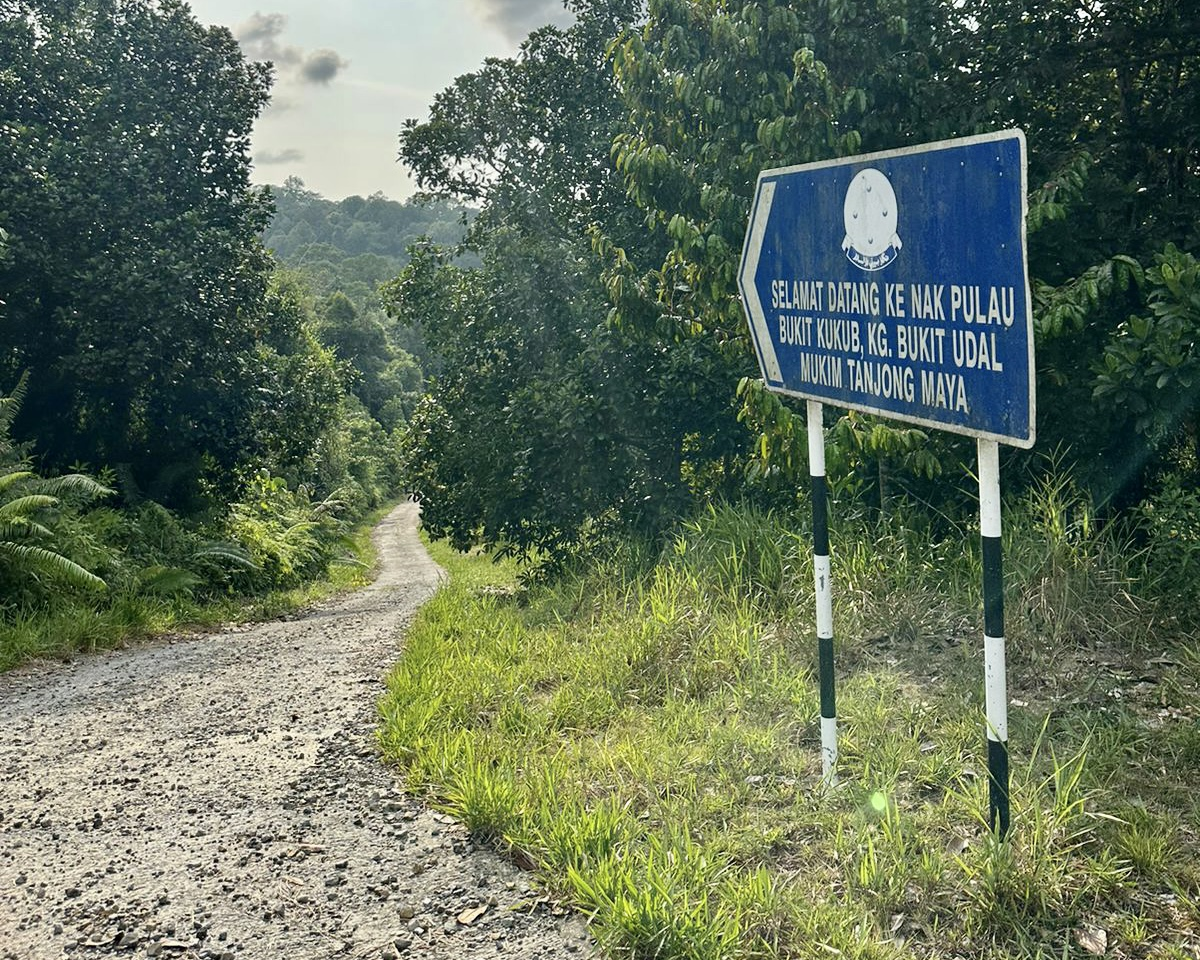
Road sign to Nak Pulau

Nak Pulau is a tiny island in a rainforest enclave, situated in the community of Bukit Udal near Tutong, Brunei, Borneo.

The forest contains many Borneoan biota, including Nepenthes ampullaria and gracilis, kalulut beetles, kalim panas tree, Aquilaria agallocha (highly prized for its scented wood, now very rare), and the unusual buttressed Shorea (known in India as "Sal"). It is said that Gautama Buddha was born under the branches of a Shorea tree.

== See also ==
- Fauna of Borneo
- Flora of Borneo
- List of islands by area
