= Kampong Lubok Pulau =

- Village
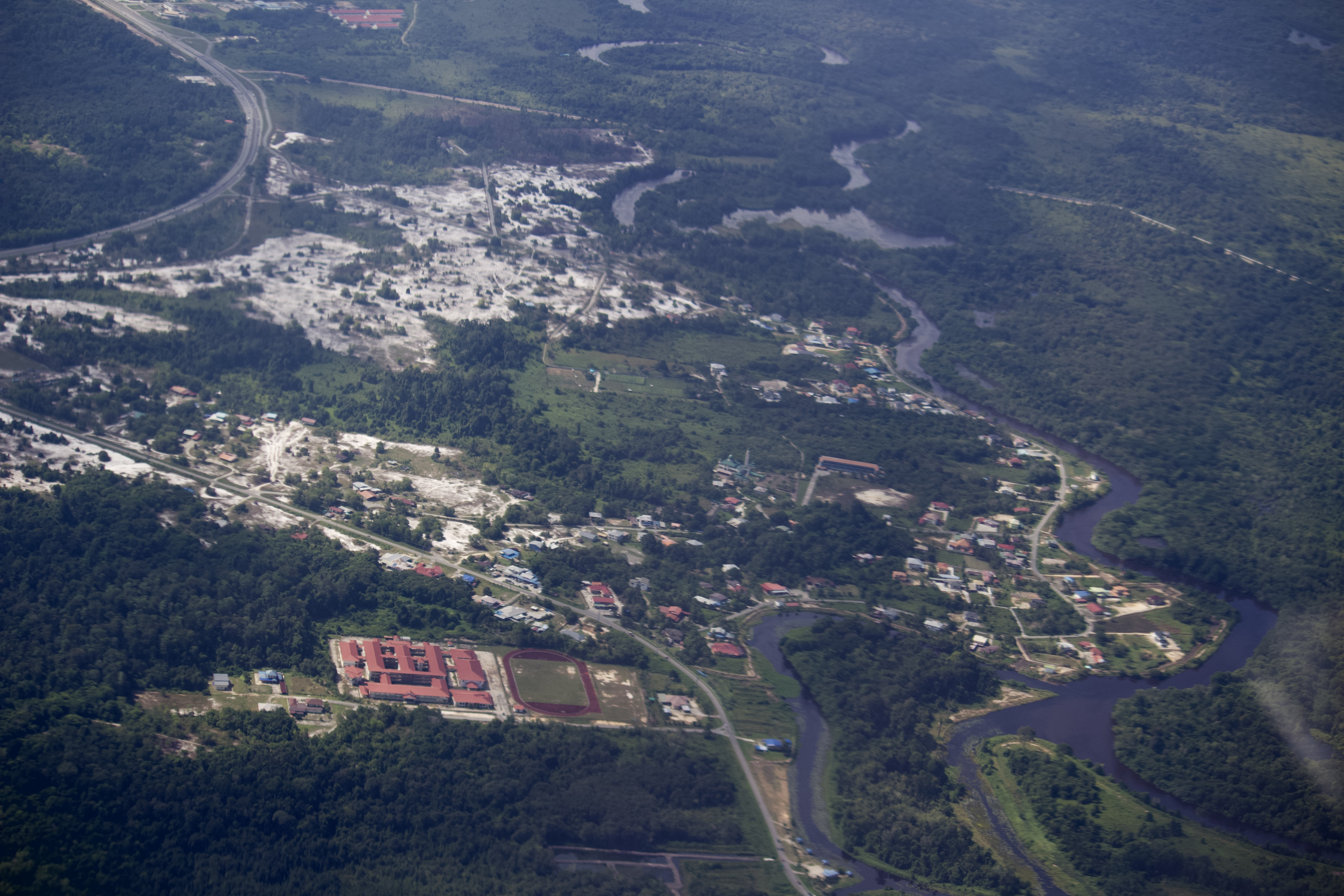

- Location in Brunei
- Coordinates: 4°46′03″N 114°39′48″E
- Country: Brunei
- District: Tutong
- Mukim: Tanjong Maya

Government
  - Village head: Nur Azmil Ismail

Population (2016)
  - Total: 496
- Time zone: UTC+8 (BNT)
- Postcode: TD2541

Kampong Lubok Pulau is a village in Tutong District, Brunei, about 7 kilometres (4.3 mi) from the district town Pekan Tutong. The population was 496 in 2016. It is one of the villages within Mukim Tanjong Maya, a mukim in the district.

== Facilities ==
Lubok Pulau Primary School is the village primary school. It also shares grounds with Lubok Pulau Religious School, the village school for the primary level of the country's Islamic religious education.

Kampong Lubok Pulau Mosque is the village mosque; it was opened in August 1995 and can accommodate 800 worshippers.
