= Kampong Penapar =

- Village
- Location in Brunei
- Coordinates: 4°43′08″N 114°40′06″E
- Country: Brunei
- District: Tutong
- Mukim: Tanjong Maya

Government
  - Village head: Masri Abdullah

Population (2016)
  - Total: 443
- Time zone: UTC+8 (BNT)
- Postcode: TD1741

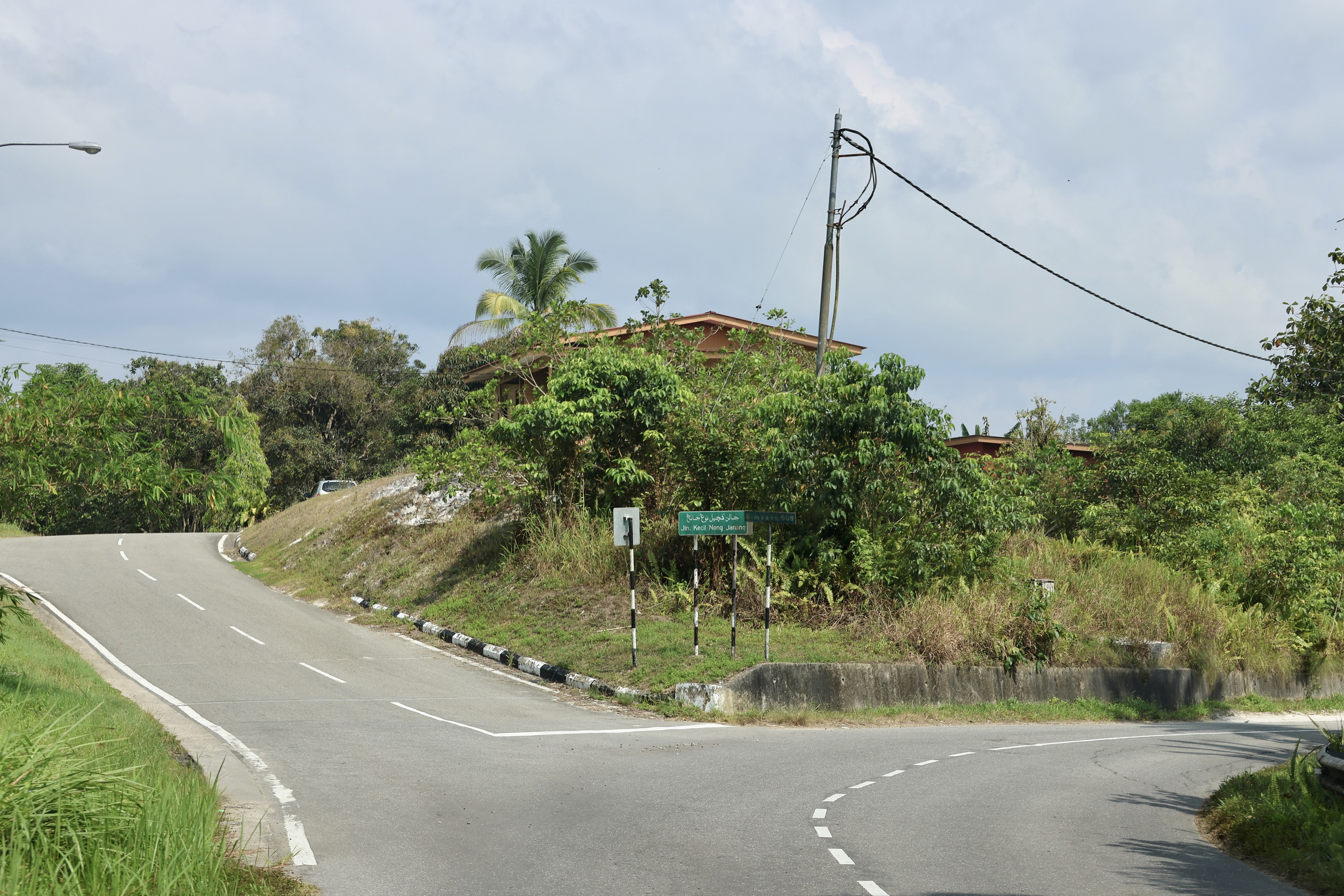
Tutong

Kampong Penapar is a village in Tutong District, Brunei, about 11–12 kilometres (6.8–7.5 mi) from the district town Pekan Tutong. The population was 443 in 2016. It is one of the villages within Mukim Tanjong Maya, a mukim in the district.

== Facilities ==
Penapar Primary School is the village primary school. It also shares grounds with Penapar Religious School, the village school for the primary level of the country's Islamic religious education.

Kampong Penapar Mosque is the village mosque. It was inaugurated on 26 July 1991 by Sultan Hassanal Bolkiah. The mosque can accommodate 200 worshippers.
