= Seri Kenangan Beach =

Beach in Tutong, Brunei

- Pantai Seri Kenangan
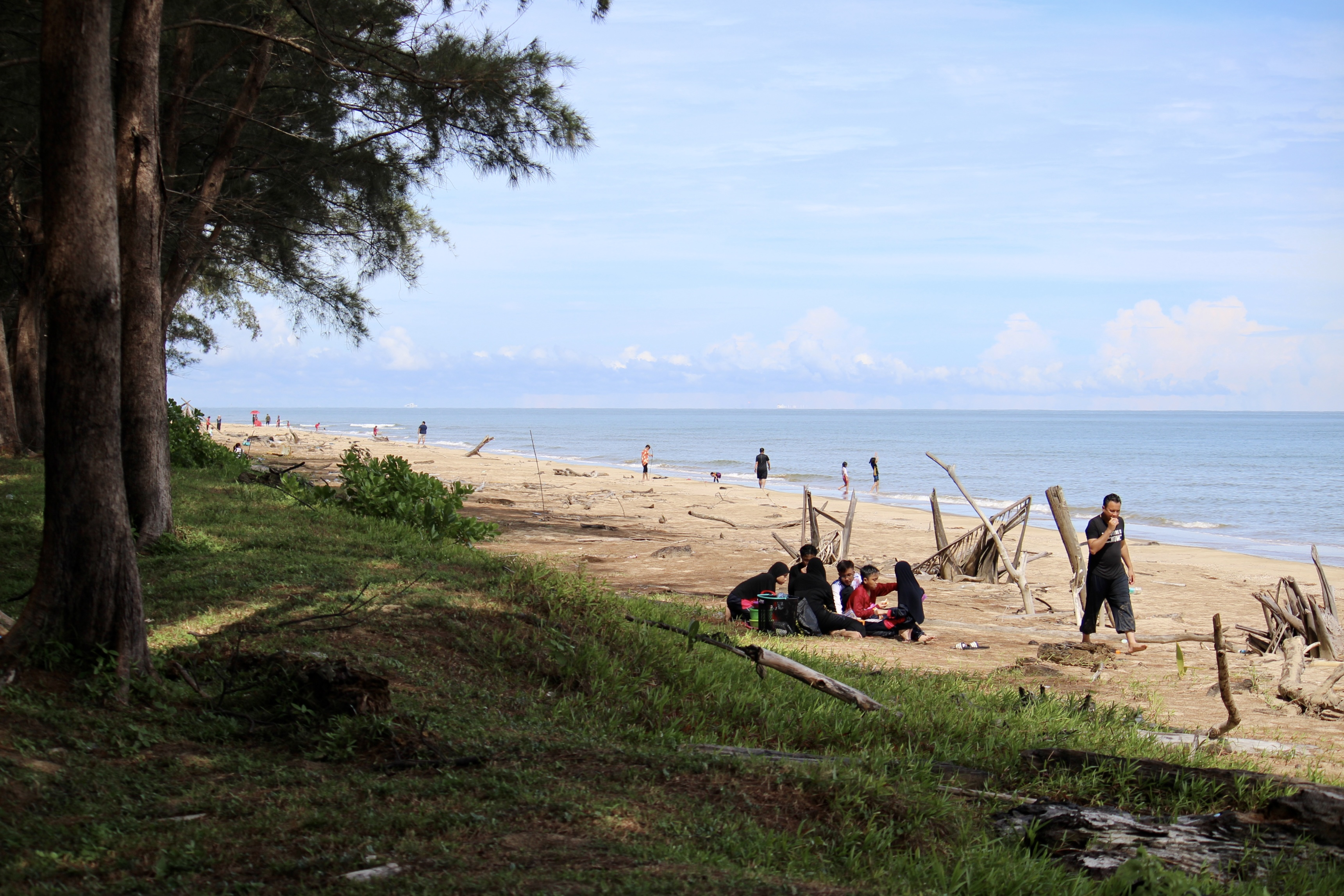
- The beach in 2022
- Interactive map of Seri Kenangan Beach
- Type: Beach
- Location: Mukim Pekan Tutong, Tutong District, Brunei
- Nearest town: Tutong Town, Tutong District, Brunei
- Coordinates: 4.8070560°N 114.6371862°E
- Opened: 26 March 1972; 54 years ago
- Founder: Pengiran Othman
- Manager: Department of Environment, Parks and Recreation (Note: The Ministry of Development's Department of Environment, Parks, and Recreation is in charge of overseeing the nation's recreational areas' upkeep and landscaping.)
- Parking: On site (no charge)

Seri Kenangan Beach (Malay: Pantai Seri Kenangan) is a recreational beach and spit located in Mukim Pekan Tutong, Tutong District. It lies approximately 2 kilometres (1.2 mi) west of Tutong town and is characterised by its unique position on a strip of land bordered by the Tutong River at the rear and the South China Sea at the front. The beach also sits in nearby villages such as Sengkarai, Penabai, and Kuala Tutong. Over time, the beach has been equipped with amenities and services, making it a popular destination for picnics and appreciating the natural environment. The surrounding areas are noted for their clay soils.

== History ==
The idea to develop Seri Kenangan Beach into a picnic area originated from Pengiran Dato Paduka Othman bin Pengiran Anak Mohd. Salleh, who served as the Tutong district officer from 7 September 1965 to 9 October 1972. Under his initiative, a project was launched to transform the beach into a picnic destination, which also included the establishment of a weekly market (tamu) at the site. This project contributed to the development of Tutong District, providing local residents with opportunities to sell agricultural produce and handicrafts at the weekly market.

Zainal Abidin bin Haji Ibrahim, the assistant district officer of Tutong from 1 September 1971 to 31 August 1973, noted that the project did not receive specific funding apart from workers' wages. To implement the initiative, the Tutong District Office collaborated with the Tutong Municipal Board and the Tutong Health Office to ensure its success. Later on 1 October 1971, a beach clean-up campaign was carried out through a community effort, involving not only government officers and staff but also Tutong residents, especially the youth. The clean-up activities included tree felling and collecting driftwood along the shore. A few months later, as clean-up operations and the provision of basic amenities were underway, the beach began to attract visitors, particularly youths, school students, and scout association members.

The official ceremony to inaugurate Seri Kenangan Beach as a recreational area and establish the weekly market there was held on 26 March 1972. The event was officiated by Isa bin Ibrahim. In his speech, he described the initiative to transform the beach into a picnic area and establish the weekly market as a commendable project that deserved encouragement. He also noted that the project in Tutong District could serve as a model for other districts to undertake similar efforts to provide such facilities. The inauguration ceremony concluded with Yang Berhormat Pehin drawing back the curtain covering the entrance gate to the beach, which bore the welcoming inscription: "Selamat Datang ke Pantai Seri Kenangan Tutong" ("Welcome to Seri Kenangan Beach, Tutong").

== Infrastructure ==
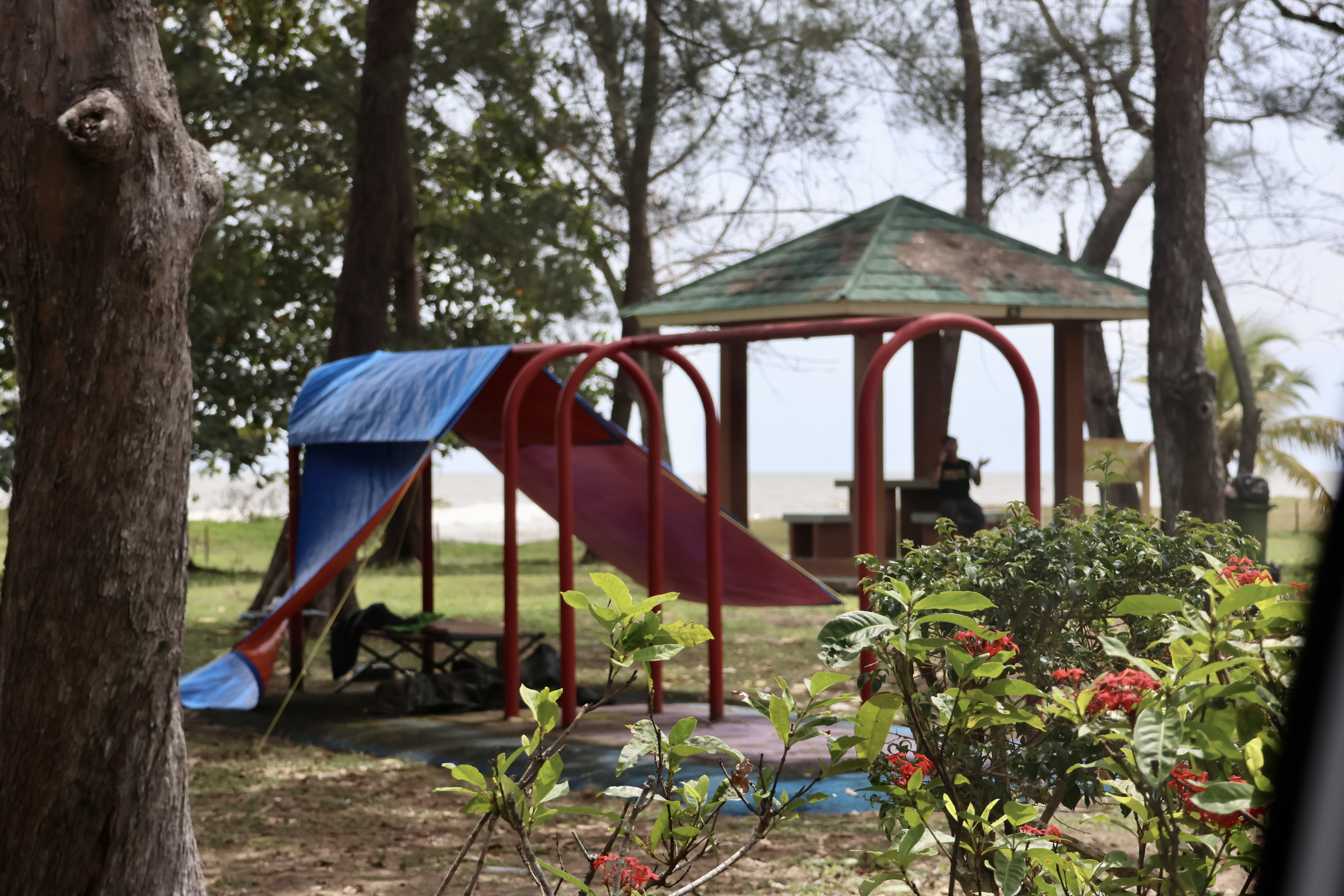
The children's playground in 2023

A parking area was constructed to accommodate five buses and 40 cars, along with additional spaces for bicycles. Clean water supplies were made available for visitors, and the banks of the nearby Tutong River were utilised to construct several beach huts, resembling jetty structures, made from local natural materials such as nibung palm, rattan, and forest timber.

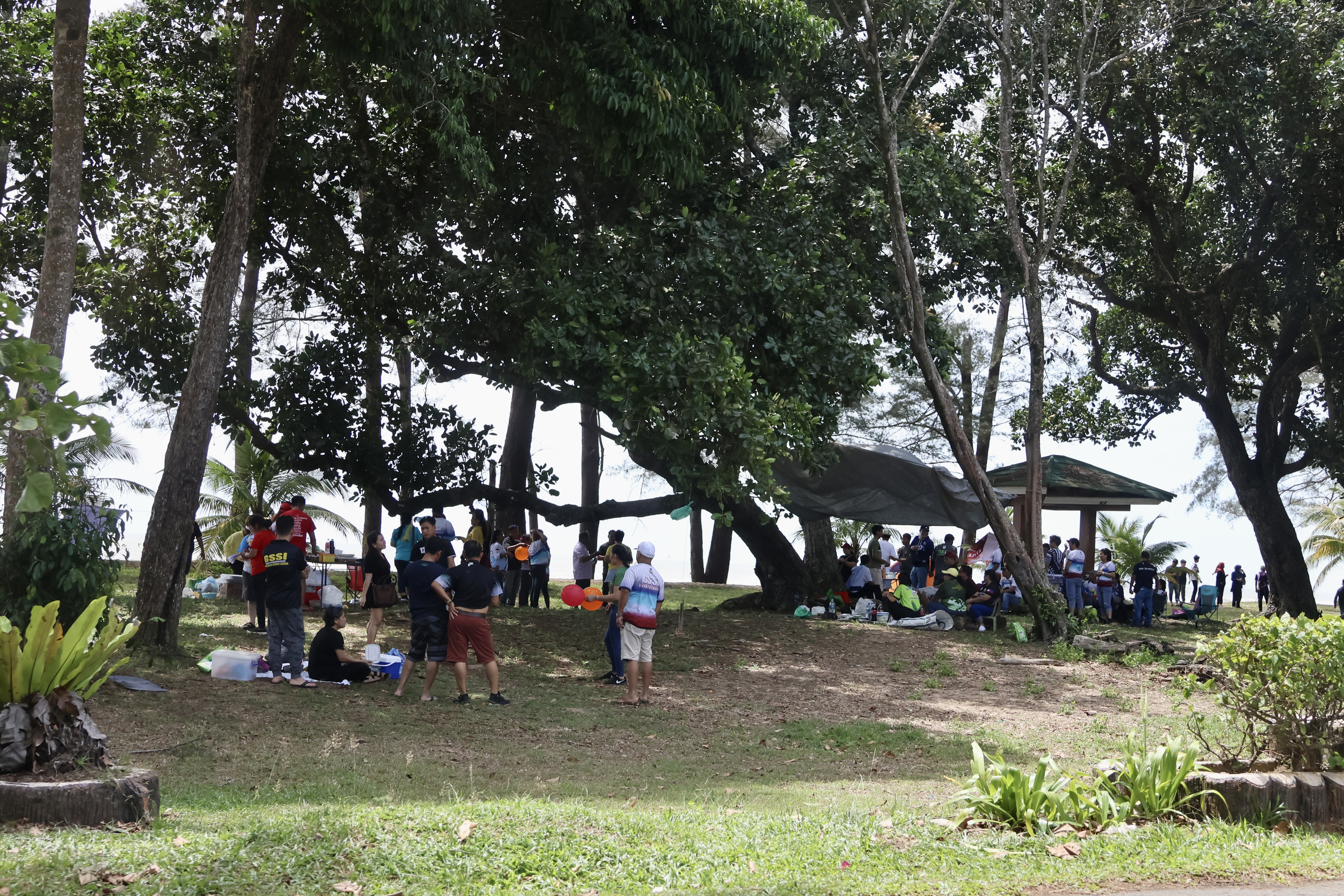
Families having a picnic at the beach in 2023

Using forest materials like nibung, rattan, wild timber, bamboo, and discarded items such as old cable spools, they designed facilities that included thirty sets of tables complete with benches, four thatched pavilions each containing ten benches for trading vegetables and fruits, and two long stalls each equipped with twelve benches for the same purpose. Additionally, a mushroom-shaped structure was built for resting, while a satay stall. A fish-shaped stall was created for selling food items such as rice, and a mushroom-shaped pavilion was designated for eating and drinking. Three pavilions, shaped like bird beaks, were used for selling drinks and light snacks. For relaxation, five bed-like benches and thirteen chairs with backrests were also installed.

Along the beach's coastline, several chalets have been built. Initially, they were constructed with walls, but after some time, these walls were removed to prevent any potential issues for visitors. The Istana Pantai, located at Seri Kenangan Beach, was built in the early 1950s as a resting place for Sultan Omar Ali Saifuddien III during his royal visits for picnics. The palace has since become an attraction. Additionally, several amenities are available at Seri Kenangan Beach, including a children's playground and a restaurant. A memorial monument in the shape of a gong and gendang gulingtangan (a traditional drum) has been constructed and adorned with appealing landscaping.

A little further along, the road passes through the village of Kuala Tutong, nestled among a forest of coconut palms, leading to the old jetty. In 1930, the government introduced a ferry service, and the ferry jetty at Kuala Sungai Tutong was built, becoming an essential facility for both public and private use. It remained crucial until 1958, when a bridge was constructed, eliminating the need for the ferry to connect the southern districts of Brunei with Bandar Seri Begawan.

== Activities ==
On 10 August 2002, a research team from the Brunei History Centre conducted a study on Seri Kenangan Beach. Coincidentally, it was during the second-term school holidays, and several visitors were found picnicking at the beach with their families. Informants shared that the public enjoys visiting the beach not only on public holidays but also on regular days. The visitors are not only locals from the surrounding area but also from other districts. According to them, in the afternoons, some visitors engage in fishing activities on the riverbank of the Tutong River, which is opposite the beach.
