= Tutong (town) =

Municipality in Brunei

- Municipality and town
- Pekan Tutong ڤكن توتوڠ
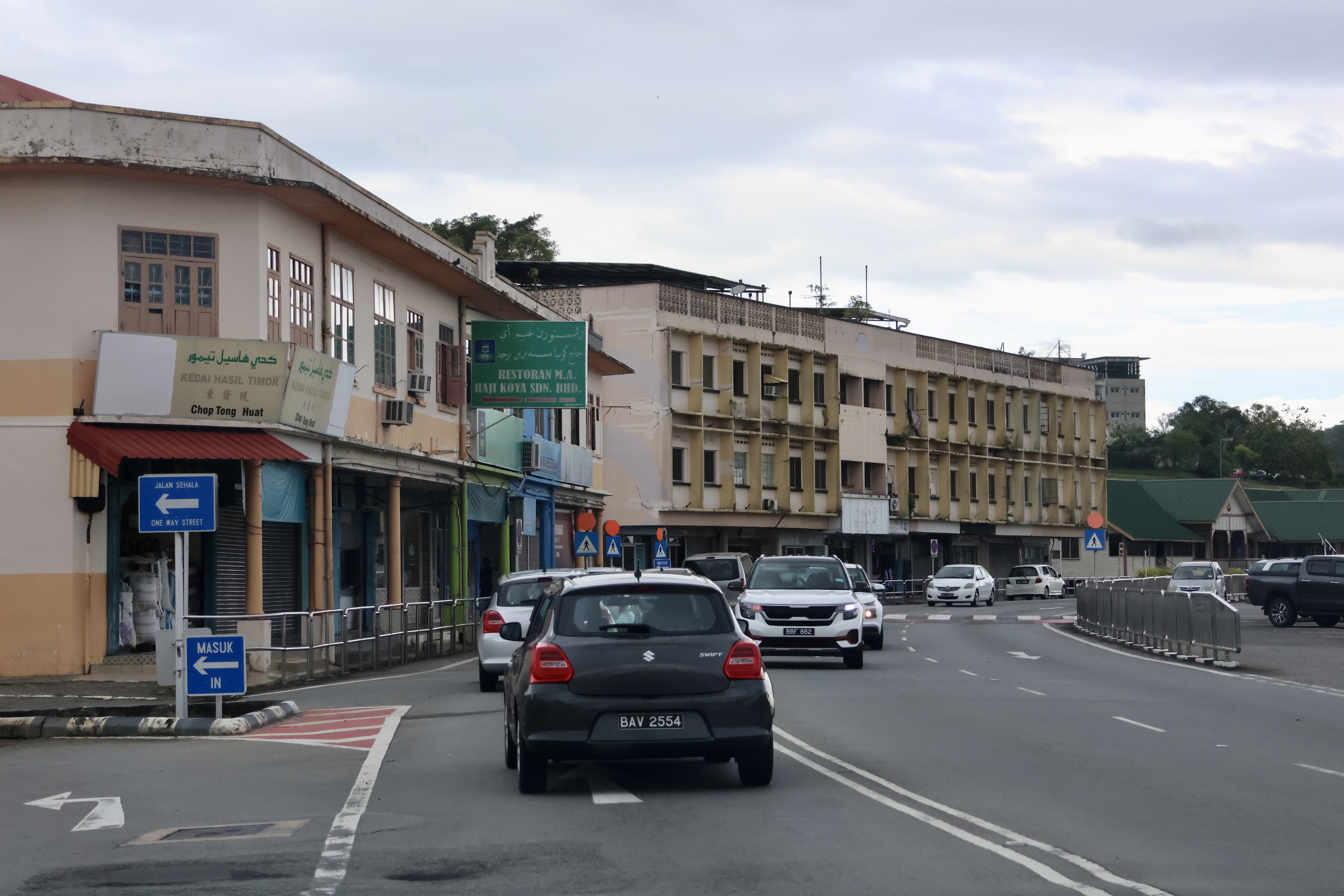
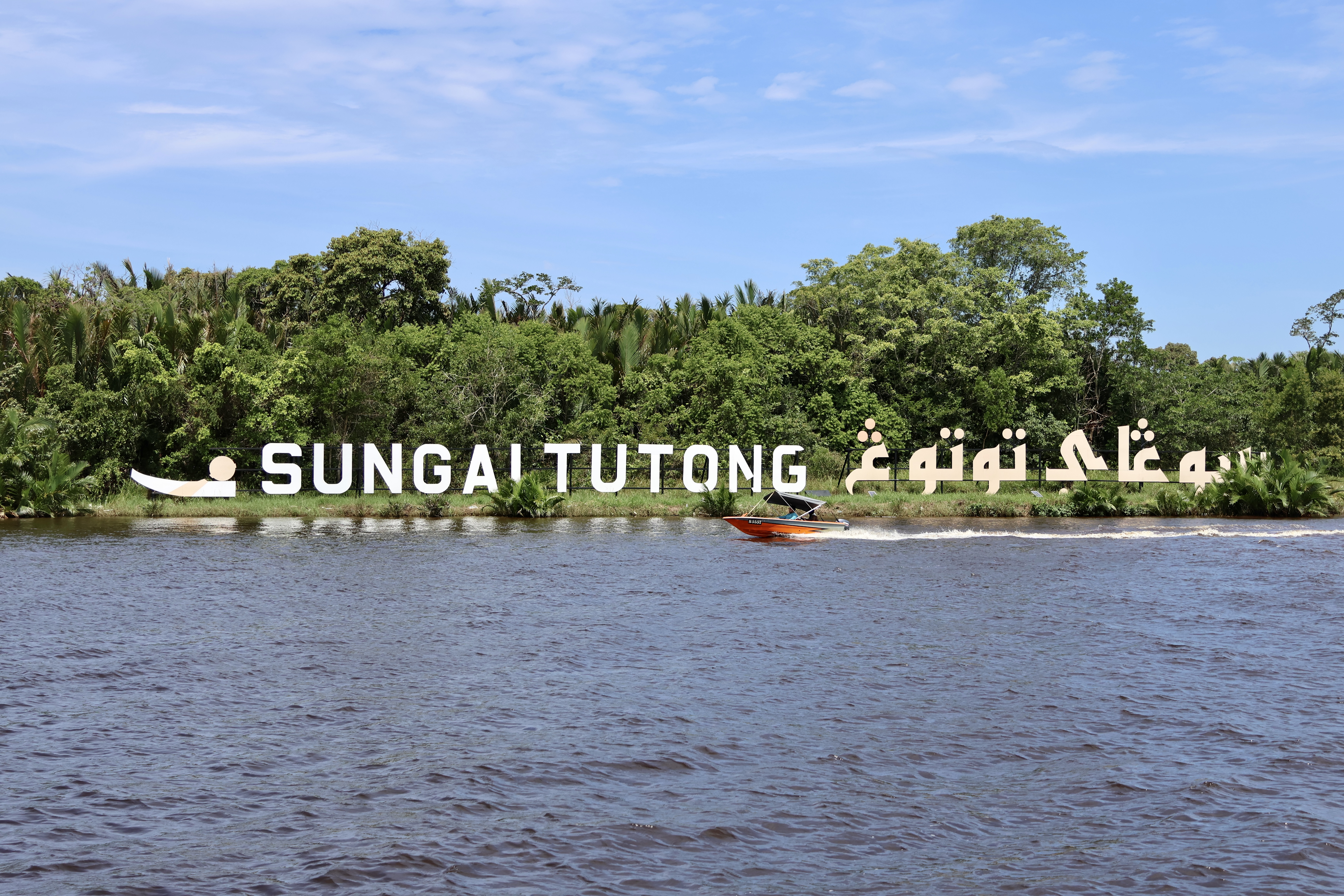
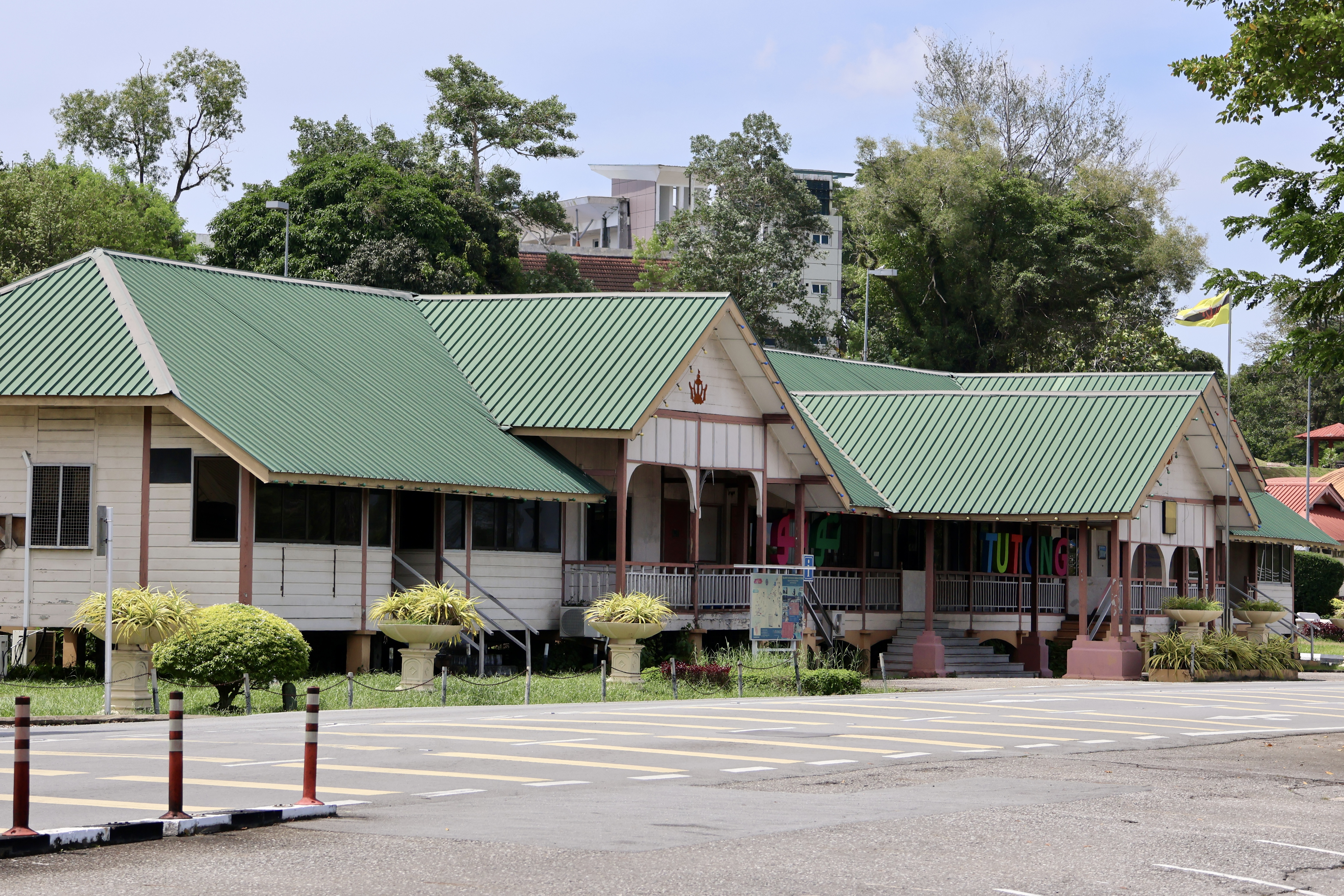
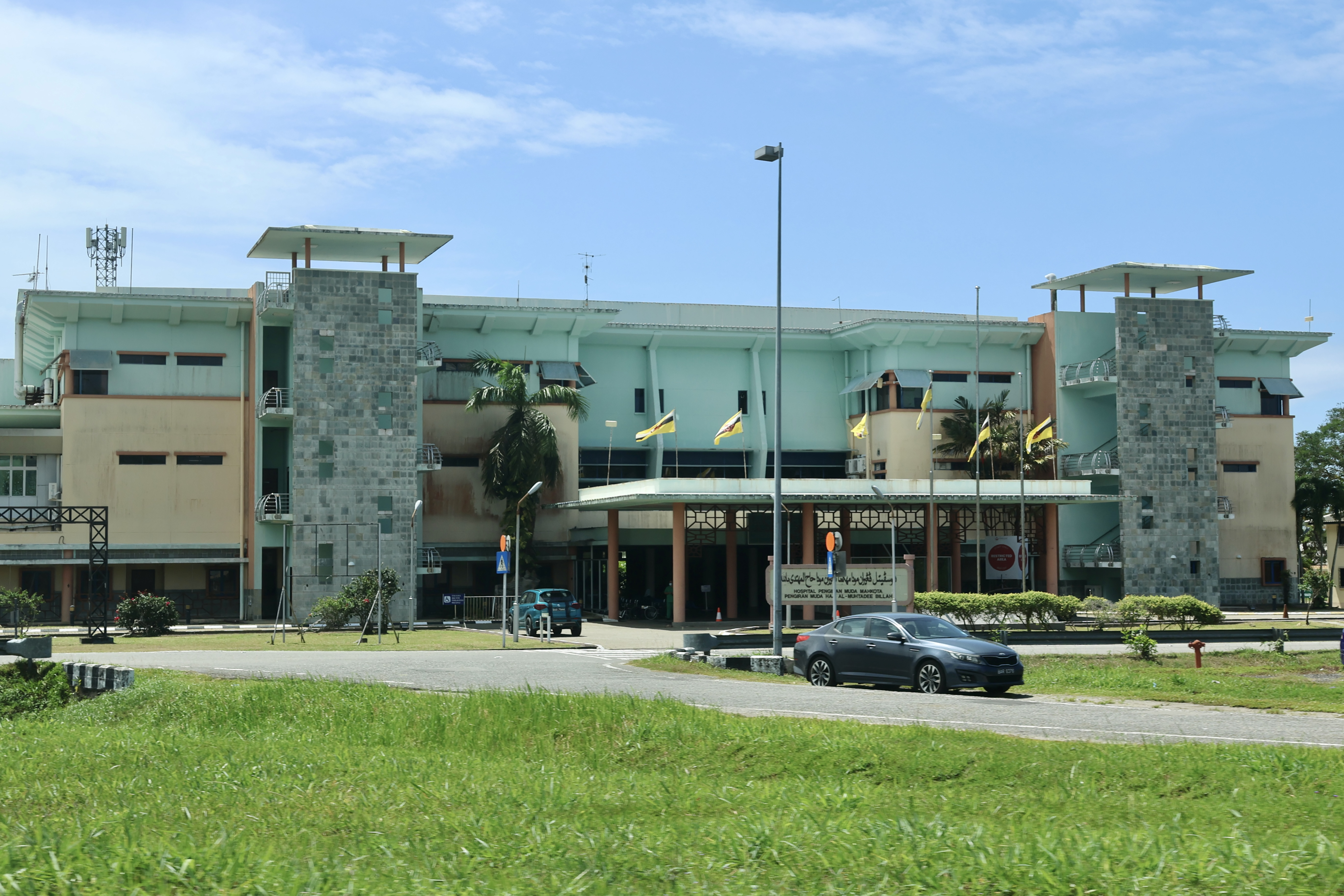
- Clockwise from top left: Jalan Enche Awang, Tutong River sign, old Tutong District Office, PMMPMHAMB Hospital

- Location in Brunei
- Coordinates: 4°48′24.0″N 114°39′33.0″E
- Country: Brunei
- District: Tutong
- Mukim: Pekan Tutong
- Villages: Bukit Bendera; Petani

Government
  - Type: Municipality
  - Body: Tutong Municipal Board
  - Chairman: Mohammad Sofian Basri (Acting)

Area
  - Total: 0.024 km^{2} (0.0093 sq mi)

Population (2021)
  - Total: 9,883
  - Density: 410,000/km^{2} (1,100,000/sq mi)
- Website: bandaran-tutong.gov.bn

Tutong Town (Malay: Pekan Tutong; Jawi: توتوڠ) or simply known as Tutong, is a municipality town in Mukim Pekan Tutong, Tutong District, Brunei. It is located about 40 kilometres (25 mi) from the country's capital Bandar Seri Begawan. It is the administrative centre of Tutong District.

== Etymology ==
the name 'Tutong' originated from an individual, and over time, the river where this person lived became known as Sungai Tutong, with those who settled there becoming known as the Tutong people. Initially, 'Tutong' referred to the people living along the river, a common naming convention in Borneo, with similar examples such as the Kelabit, named after the Labid River, and various river-dwelling groups in Sandakan and Kinabatangan. The name 'Tutong' itself, like many Borneo ethnic groups, was derived from external sources rather than self-designated, and the Tutong are also known as Sang Keluyoh by the Dusun people, meaning "people of the Keluyoh River."

== Geography ==
Tutong town is located on the northern bank of the Tutong River and is crossed by an old main road that served as the primary route before the 1980s, connecting Bandar Seri Begawan to the east and Seria and Kuala Belait to the west. It has long been the heart of administrative activity in the Tutong District, serving as a central hub for government operations since the introduction of modern administration by the British Resident in the early 20th century. The town itself is a small settlement within the area of Kampong Petani. Originally, the village was situated along a small river, a tributary of the Tutong River, which now lies at the site of the Fire and Rescue Department in Tutong town.

Due to its strategic location, Petani has increasingly become a popular destination for people from surrounding villages, who visit for business or other daily affairs, almost becoming a central hub or "pekan" (town). This can be attributed to its positioning along the riverbank, which serves as the main route for those coming from the sea (entering the mouth of the Tutong River) and moving upstream, as well as for those from inland areas heading downstream. This situation reflects the vital role that the sea and rivers played as key communication routes in the past. Over time, the settlement has evolved into a strategic area and a key point for trade and other activities, eventually becoming the central "capital" for the administration under the British Resident.

== History ==
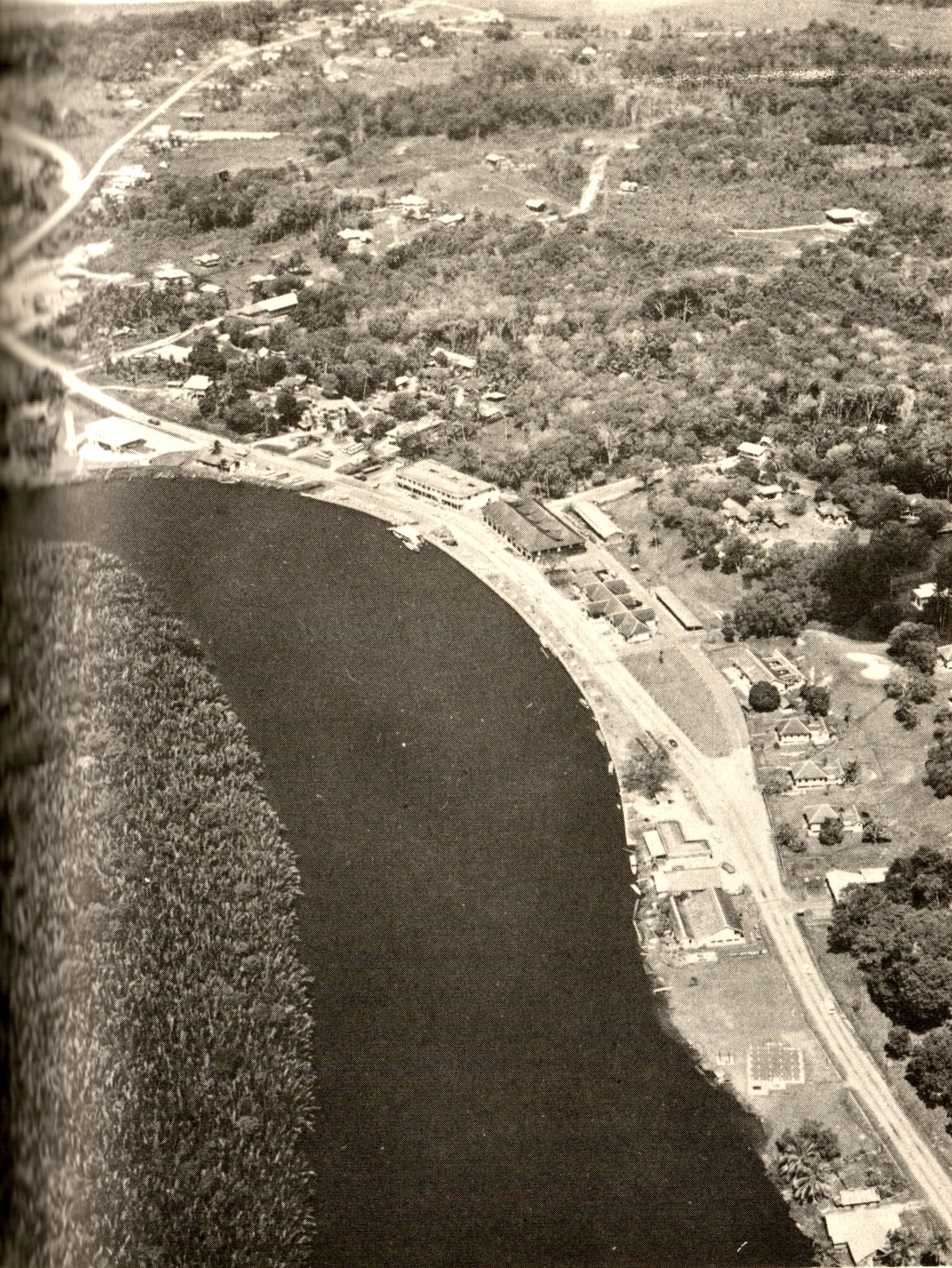
Aerial photograph of Tutong town and Tutong River, c. 1967

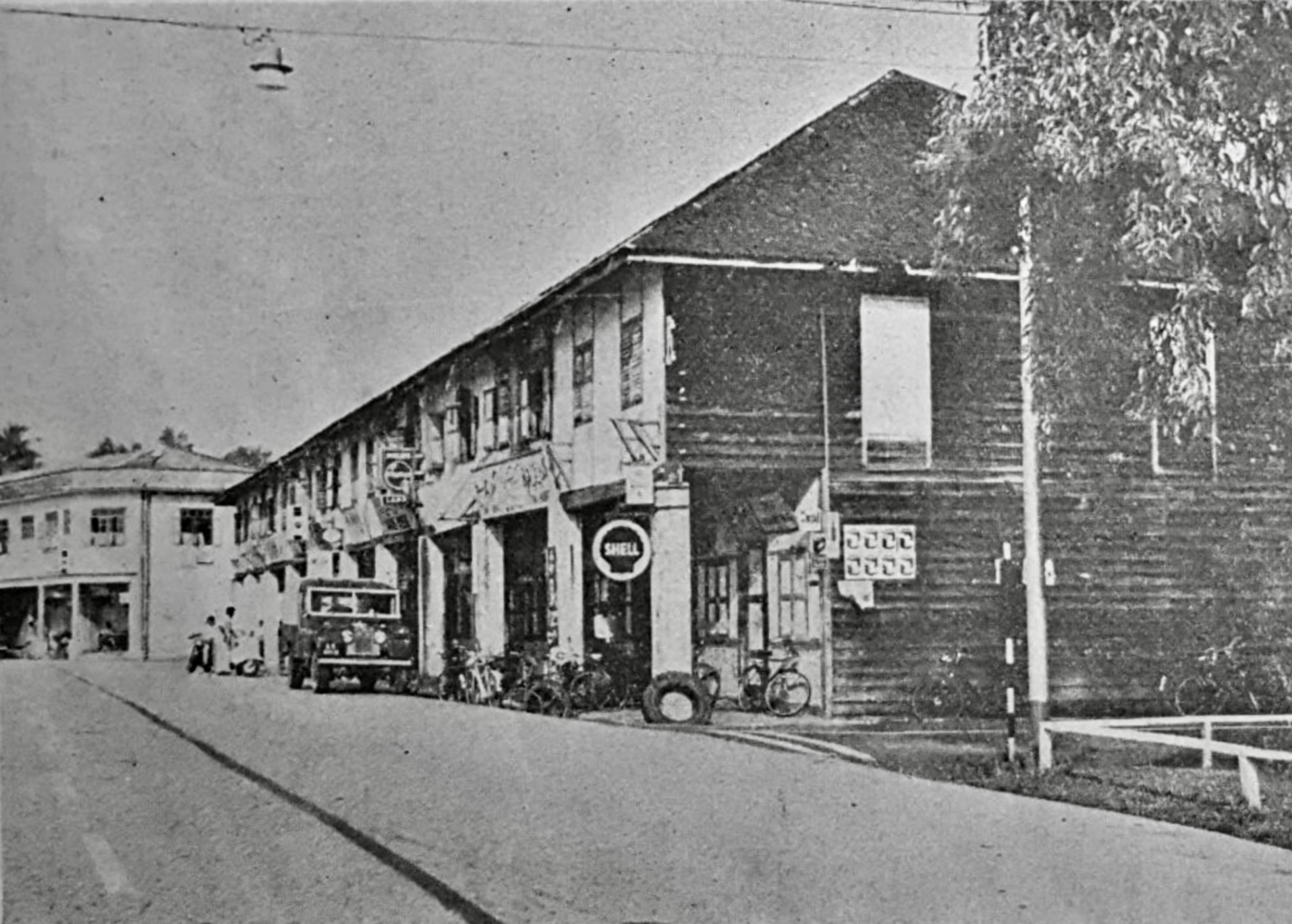
Wooden shophouses, c. 1967

In 1900, the location was a small settlement with just four or five simple houses and a few shops. The village began its transformation with the construction of its first government building in 1910, followed by its establishment in 1911, and the commencement of oil exploration in 1913. In 1918, the village founded its first Malay vernacular school, marking the beginning of its growth and modernisation, which culminated in the village's name change to Tutong. In 1923, Brunei Shell Petroleum (BSP) had drilled eight exploratory wells, and a 30 miles (48 km) road connecting Brunei Town to Tutong was constructed between 1924 and 1925 at a cost of B$22,000, running along the northern bank of the Tutong River. A wireless communication system began operating in 1924, and the Brunei-Tutong road was officially opened in 1927. The town was incorporated as a sanitary board area in 1929, responsible for overseeing cleanliness and development. That same year, the road was extended to Seria, supported by two jetties, and ferry services were introduced in 1945.

In 1931, telephone lines were introduced, connecting Brunei Town to Tutong, and by 1932, these lines reached Kuala Belait. Postal services were introduced in 1936, and a small hospital was built in the same year to expand healthcare. However, the Japanese occupation during World War II led to the destruction of key buildings, including the hospital. After the war ended in 1946, the facilities were repaired and expanded, including the addition of a police station and the introduction of maternal healthcare services. A clean water supply system was established in 1950, sourced from Kampong Panchor Dulit, and an electricity supply project began in 1955, with a power plant fully operational by 1956 and further expanded in 1958. In 1958, the completion of direct road links between Tutong and Kuala Belait improved traffic flow, and the magneto-telephone switchboard was installed at key government offices. The Tutong Bridge was completed in 1959, eliminating the need for ferries.

During the 1962 Brunei revolt, rebels from the North Kalimantan National Army briefly took control of Tutong, and a convoy of soldiers from the Royal Gurkha Rifles was ambushed. In response to the growing needs of the town, the government began investing in infrastructure development in the following years. In 1966, a new police station complex was constructed, alongside other public amenities, including a community hall, new government office buildings, guest houses, a public playground, and a telephone exchange. The government's commitment to improving infrastructure continued in 1967 with a $500,000 investment in a new government building, and the construction of a carpentry school, fire station, and additional facilities. Roads were paved, and bridges and wells were built to enhance the standard of living.

In 1968, the government constructed a new fire station located near the market along the Tutong River, replacing the former site of Petani. The fire station, which became fully operational on 19 April 1969, housed a trained brigade with 104 firefighters and the necessary equipment to serve the town and surrounding areas. In 1970, the Tutong Municipal Board replaced the former sanitary board, and in 1973, the Sungai Tutong Water Supply Scheme improved the water supply to Bandar Seri Begawan.

== Administration ==
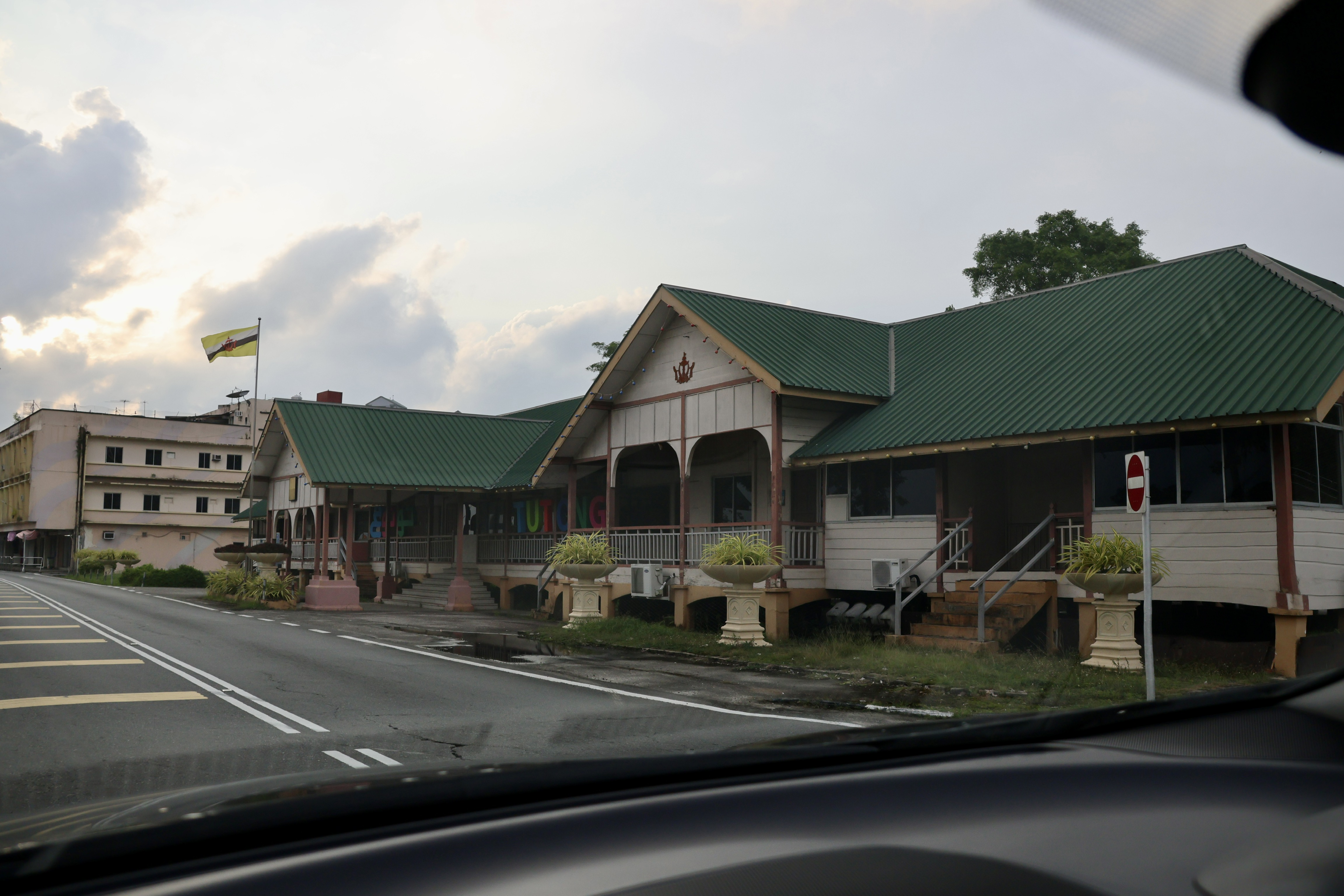
The old Tutong District Office

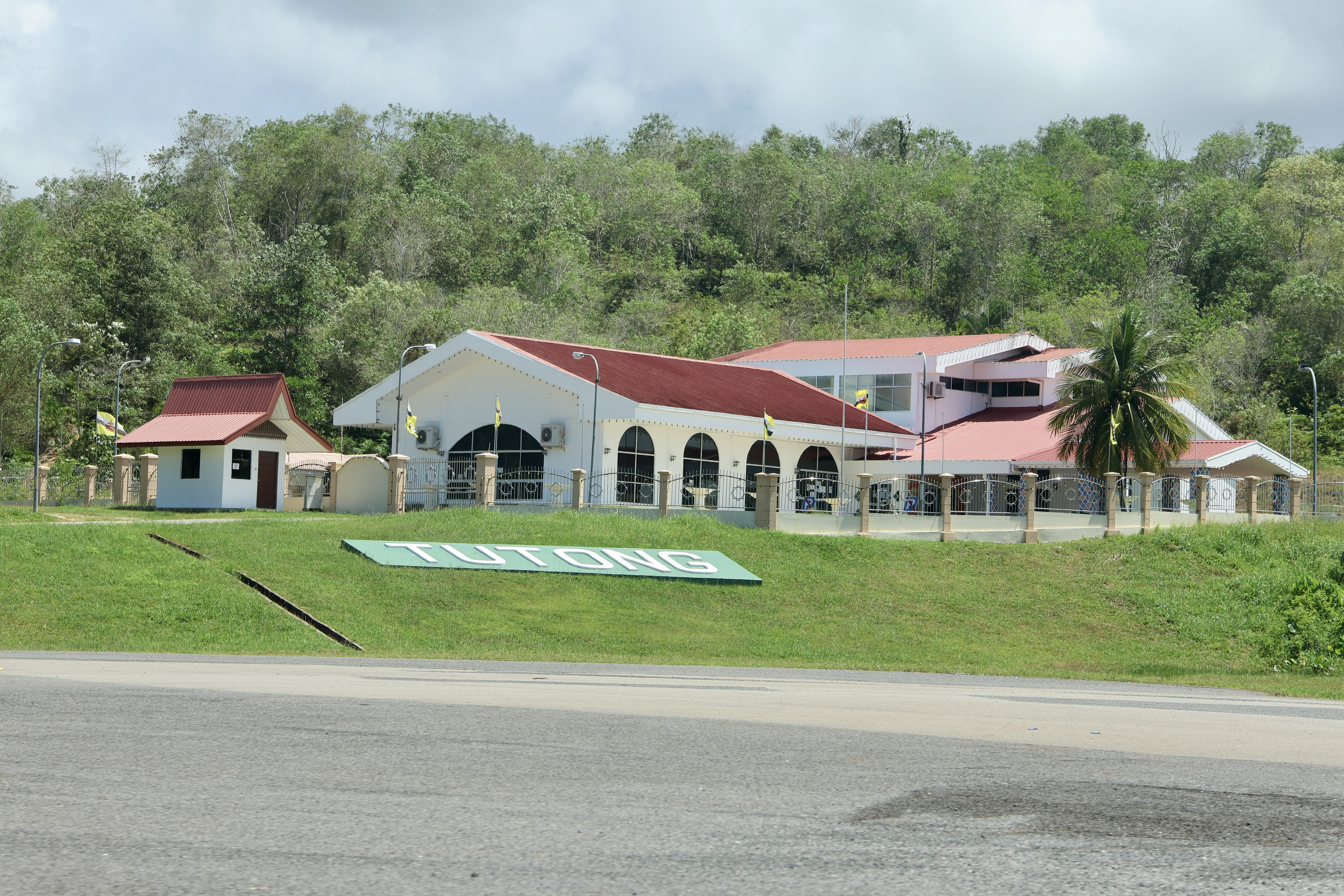
The residence of the Tutong District Officer in 2023

Although initially limited in scope under British Resident administration, Tutong town became a focal point for the growing needs of the local population. Over time, the government's responsibilities expanded to cover various areas, including trade, security, customs, and land management, with district officers playing a key role. As the town and surrounding community evolved, administrative duties extended to the wider district and its interior, addressing the basic needs of the population. The influence of the national development plan, particularly during the early reign of Sultan Omar Ali Saifuddien III, contributed to the growth of Tutong town, alongside the 1959 Agreement and the formation of the constitution, which granted full local administrative control. The appointment of local leaders, such as district officers and department heads, instilled a sense of confidence, competence, and direction in the region. These factors collectively spurred rapid and systematic development, transforming Tutong into an administrative and economic centre.

Historical records indicate that the administration of Tutong town was overseen by an officer appointed by the British Resident, who served as both district officer and magistrate. The first person entrusted with this responsibility was Mohiddin bin Haji Awang, who served from 1908 to 1911, although his tenure was brief. (Note: On 21 August 1911, Mohiddin was murdered along with a customs research officer named Haji Hassan, who was also serving as an interpreter in a trial. The murder stemmed from dissatisfaction with Mohiddin's decision regarding a case involving the ownership of a water buffalo, which was reported missing from its pen and was owned by Kula (also referred to as 'Kualah') bin Pengarah Osman. Since the ruling did not favour him, Kula decided to kill the magistrate and Haji Hassan.) Today, the town is officially a Municipal Board area, covering 240.2 hectares (594 acres). The members consist of government officers, the penghulu of Mukim Pekan Tutong, and appointed representatives from the local residents, organisations, and business community. The Tutong Municipal Department is primarily responsible for collecting revenue from building taxes, commercial licence fees, and the rental of commercial lots in centres owned by the department. The municipality spans an area of about 0.024 square kilometres (0.0093 sq mi), encompassing parts of Petani and Bukit Bendera.

== Climate ==
Tutong has a consistently high temperatures and abundant rainfall throughout the year, characteristic of its tropical rainforest climate.

Month	Jan	Feb	Mar	Apr	May	Jun	Jul	Aug	Sep	Oct	Nov	Dec	Year
Average High (°C)	31	31	32	33	33	33	33	33	32	32	32	32	-
Average Low (°C)	24	24	24	24	24	24	24	24	24	24	24	24	-
Average Rainfall (mm)	360	200	190	287	288	226	196	219	250	284	260	297	2626

== Demography ==
The development of Tutong town has been greatly shaped by population growth and the expansion of settlements. What began as a small village with approximately 3,500 residents in 1911 grew to a population of 10,710 by 1960, and further to 15,858 by 1971. By the early 21st century, the town's population had reached 5,641. This population increase spurred the development of residential areas to accommodate the growing community, which in turn required the establishment of public facilities to ensure the welfare and well-being of the residents. The influx of people into Tutong from surrounding areas—whether for work, trade, or access to basic amenities—also contributed to the town's expansion. This migration led to the creation of new settlements and housing areas, further extending the town's boundaries. Additionally, the rising birth rate among local families, who traditionally prefer to live in extended family communities, further fuelled the population growth.

== Infrastructures ==
=== Government ===
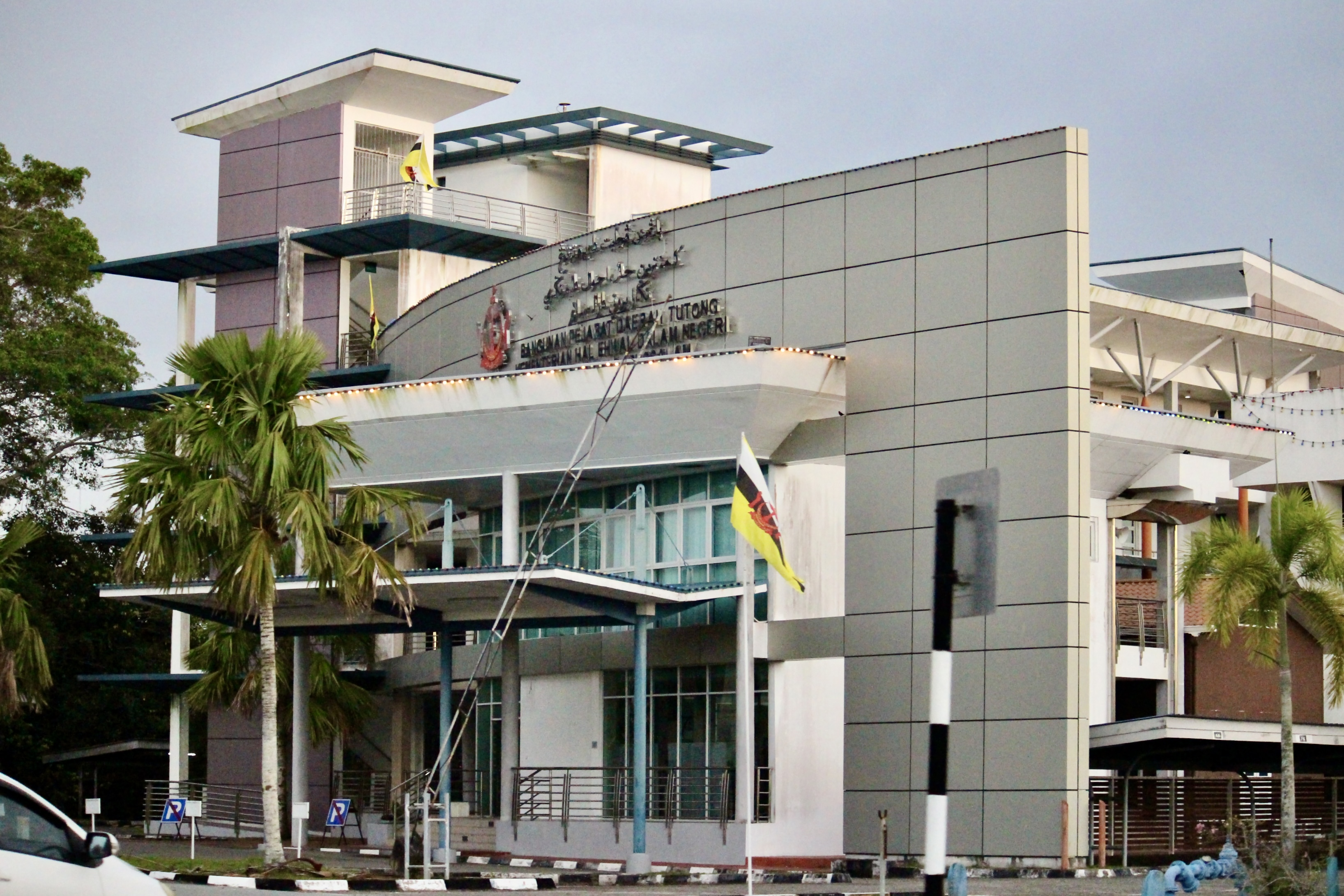
The new Tutong District Office

To consolidate and coordinate public affairs in the Tutong District, the government planned the construction of a new, more comfortable government office building in Tutong town. Located at Bukit Bendera, opposite the playground of the Muda Hashim Secondary School, the building was completed and began operations in 1980. It housed the district officer's office as its main tenant and was officially opened by Sultan Hassanal Bolkiah on 17 September 1980. In 1994, the government began construction of another new office building in Bukit Bendera, spanning 2.3 hectares (5.7 acres) of land. The three-storey building, costing $5.8 million, was completed in 1995. This new building housed several long-standing government departments. It also accommodated the Ministry of Primary Resources and Tourism, along with its sub-departments such as forestry, fisheries, and agriculture.

One of the Royal Brunei Land Force's military bases is Tutong Camp, where the RBLF Second Battalion is stationed. at addition to a shooting range at Binturan, the RBLF maintains two army and military police garrisons in the Tutong District: Tutong and Penanjong Camp.

On 3 December 2012, the National Isolation Centre (NIC) was officially opened in town. During the COVID-19 pandemic in Brunei, the NIC has reached full capacity within a day on 14 August 2021.

=== Commerce ===
The Tutong Market, a wet market managed by the Municipal Department, is located in Sengkarai, just outside the municipal area.

=== Education ===
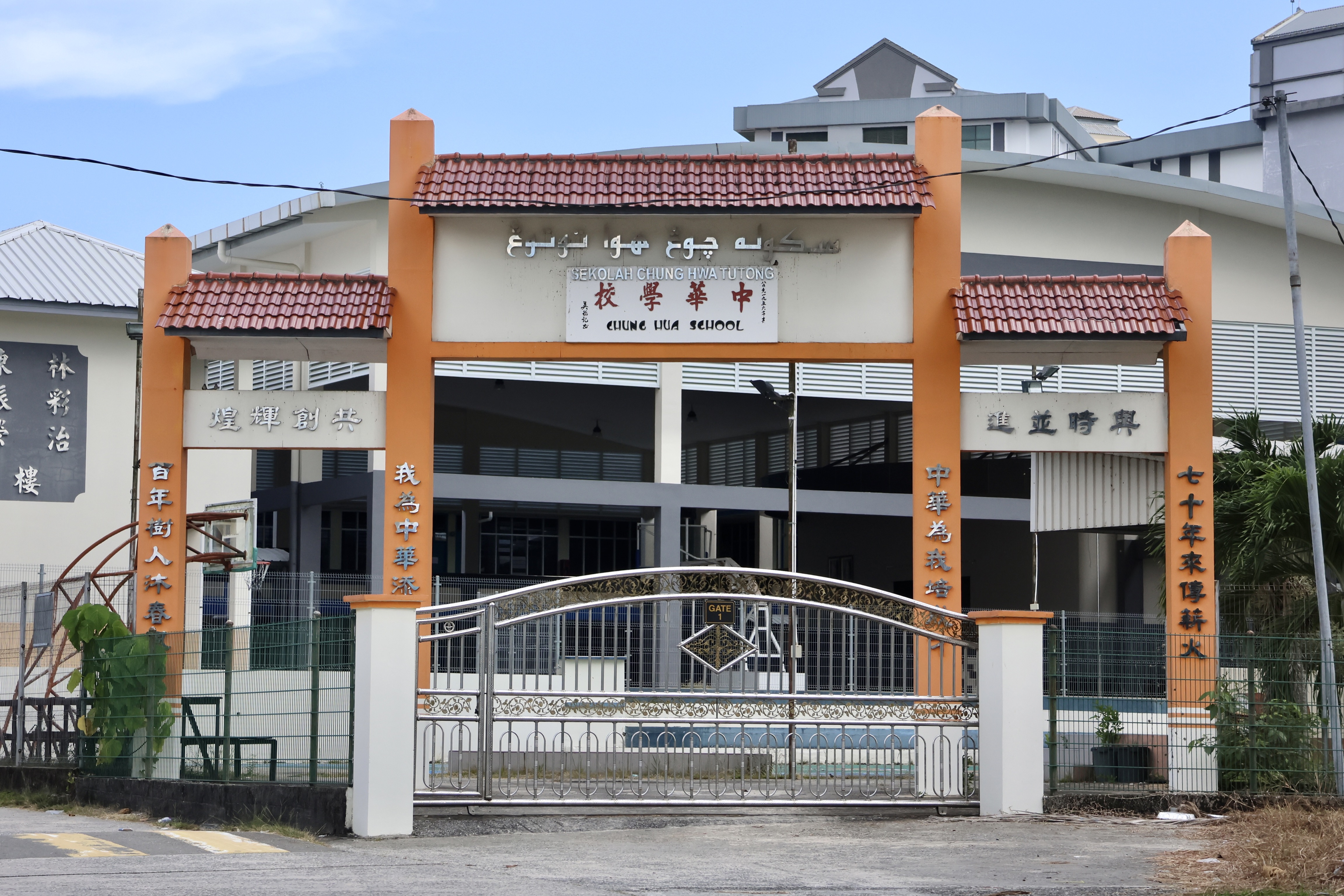
Chung Hwa Tutong School

Initially, the Petani Malay School operated temporarily within the premises of the police station in Petani, situated at the foot of a hill overlooking the Tutong River. The building was shared with the district office and the magistrate's court. The government's efforts to provide basic education at the primary level, which began in 1917, advanced to lower secondary education in the 1960s. According to the annual report of 1959, the government had established 13 primary schools outside Tutong town and in remote villages across the district, catering to 1,230 students. By 1968, this number had grown to 30 Malay primary schools, with an enrolment of 3,209 students taught by 167 teachers. This increase represented a threefold growth compared to 1959. Students who completed sixth grade and wished to pursue secondary education had to relocate to Tutong town, where lower secondary classes for form one and two were introduced in 1963.

Tutong town is now home to several educational institutions, including Chung Hwa Tutong School, Muda Hashim Primary School, Pertama Tutong School, Muda Hashim Secondary School, and Sufri Bolkiah Secondary School, with both public and private options available. Additionally, Ma'had Islam Brunei provides Islamic education in the area. While there is no dedicated sixth form centre in the town itself, sixth form education for the entire Tutong District is offered at the Tutong Sixth Form Centre.

=== Places of interest ===
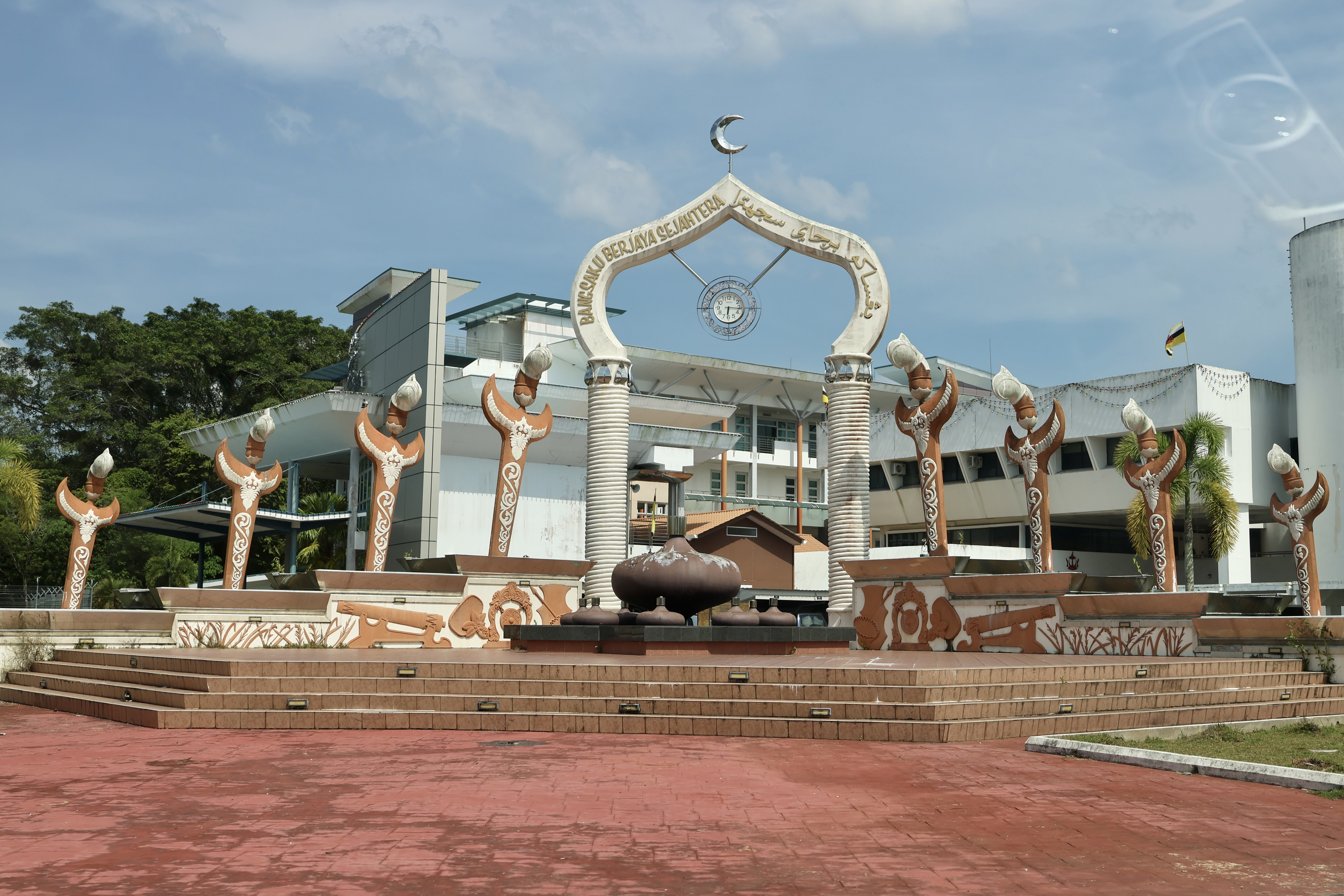
Mercu Tanda Kenangan

The Hassanal Bolkiah Mosque is the sole mosque serving the Muslim residents of Tutong and nearby villages, including Panchor Dulit, Panchor Papan, and Serambangun. Another notable landmark is Istana Pantai, a palace built by Sultan Omar Ali Saifuddien III in the 1950s, located along Seri Kenangan Beach.

The Tugu Peringatan Dewan Kemasyarakat Daerah, constructed around 1992, is located in front of the community hall. Made entirely of concrete, the monument was inaugurated by Sultan Hassanal Bolkiah during a thanksgiving and royal visit ceremony to the Tutong District, marking the 25th anniversary of his ascension to the throne on 26 October 1992. The construction was a collaboration between Jasra E.L.F. Company and the Brunei government.

The Tugu Mercu Tanda Kenangan, built around 2004, is located in front of the district office building. Made entirely of concrete, the monument is themed "Bangsaku Berjaya Seja Tugu Mega Tanda Kenangan" and was constructed to commemorate the 58th birthday celebration of Sultan Hassanal Bolkiah. It serves as a permanent gift from the people of the Tutong District, symbolising their unwavering loyalty and devotion to the sultan.

=== Miscellaneous ===
The Tutong Sports Complex offers a variety of facilities, including spaces for football, athletics, swimming, tennis, badminton, and basketball, catering to the sporting needs of the district.

Sugan Muslim Cemetery is situated in Kampong Suran. Oral history from Kampong Panchor claims that "Si Ugan," a member of the Tutong people, was the first person interred there. The local pronunciation of "Si Ugan" changed over time to "Sugan," which became the cemetery's name. It is thought that Si Ugan resided close to the boundary between Kampong Panchor Papan and Kampong Panchor Dulit, on the banks of the Tutong River. In addition to farming, including growing rice, and trading, he was a professional fisherman. He was laid to rest in this cemetery after dying.

Telting Muslim Cemetery is situated on a small hill about ten feet above sea level in Tutong town, beside the police barracks. A group of Islamic burials with many marble tombstones has been found in this area. Research guides indicate that Telting, a Muslim from Kampong Tanjong Maya, was the first person buried in this cemetery, leading the Tutong people to name it Telting in his honour. However, the precise location of Telting's grave remains unknown. Another account suggests that the area was originally known as Kampong Telting, a settlement believed to have existed around the 18th century. It was home to Si Untak.

== Mythology ==
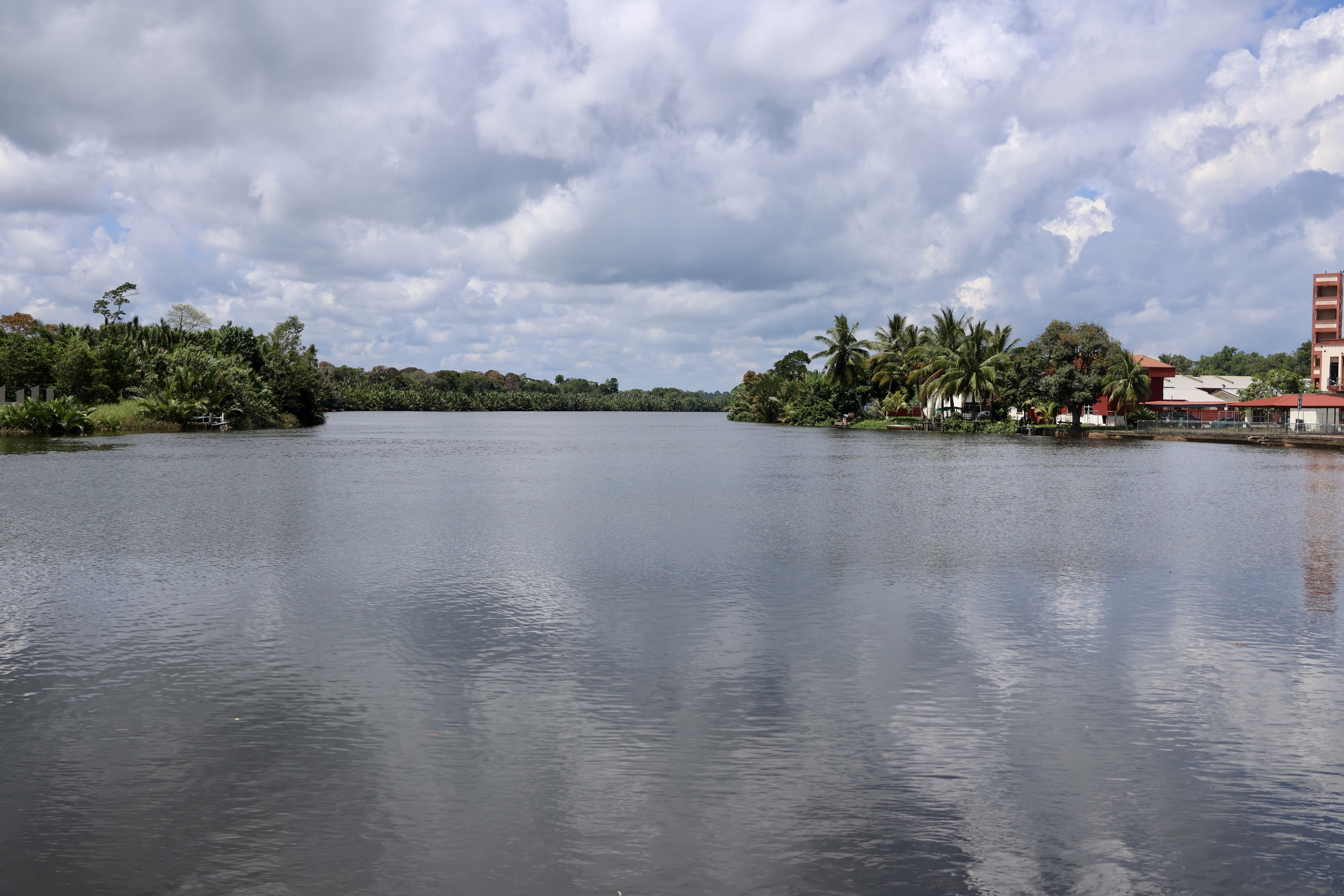
Downstream along the Tutong River, with the fire and police stations located on the right-hand side

The tale of Ajung Si Untak, as passed down through generations, tells of a tragic curse brought about by a mother's heartbreak after being abandoned by her son, Si Untak. Before his fateful voyage from their home in Tanjong Maya, Si Untak and his mother lived in wealth and comfort. However, driven by ambition and the desire to expand his fortune through trade, the young and determined Si Untak sought his mother's permission to journey abroad. Reluctantly, and with a heavy heart, his mother agreed, knowing his departure would leave her in loneliness.

Si Untak, confident that his mother would not endure hardship thanks to the wealth left by his late father and the support of their kind-hearted villagers, embarked on his journey. With a capable crew and ample supplies, his grand ship sailed through Kuala Tutong, and into the South China Sea without incident. During his travels, he encountered a mysterious sea foam in the Java Sea, which revealed a beautiful princess. Si Untak married the princess, and together they enjoyed prosperity and success.

Years later, having achieved significant wealth, Si Untak decided to return home. As his ship slowly made its way into Kuala Tutong, the villagers along the riverbanks recognised it and excitedly celebrated his return. Their joyous shouts reached the ears of Si Untak's mother, who, now living in poverty, was overcome with elation. Filled with hope, she rowed her rickety boat towards her son's magnificent ship, despite being dressed in tattered clothing.

Eager to reunite with her son, she called out to him, declaring herself his mother. Si Untak, ashamed and unwilling to acknowledge the frail and impoverished old woman as his mother, rejected her. Embarrassed in front of his wife and crew, he ordered his men to push her boat away. Despite her heartfelt pleas and recounting her sacrifices and prayers for his safety, Si Untak remained unmoved. Devastated, his mother retreated, vowing never to seek his sympathy again.

In her sorrow, she cursed her son, praying to God to punish his arrogance and betrayal. Her anguished words summoned a fierce storm. The skies darkened, thunder roared, and lightning struck as powerful winds lashed the waters. Si Untak, his wife, crew, and ship were engulfed by the calamity and transformed into stone. To this day, the ship-shaped rock, along with smaller formations, serves as a poignant reminder of the tale—a lesson to the younger generation about the consequences of dishonouring one's mother.

In Mukim Pekan Tutong, the legend of Ajung Si Untak continues to be a cherished part of local heritage, with the story physically linked to a significant site. A large rock formation, believed to be the cursed vessel of Si Untak, once stood in an area submerged by water. Villagers recalled its resemblance to a ship, accompanied by smaller stones shaped like people and animals, including chickens. In the 1940s, the stone of Si Untak's boat, as well as a stone resembling a seated person (believed to be Si Untak himself), along with stones resembling his chicken and cat, were still visible. Today, only the back of Si Untak's boat stone remains visible near the Tutong River. The Ajung Si Untak is now said to lie near the banks of the Tutong River, behind the police barracks in Tutong town, and close to the Telting Cemetery. Over time, the formations have become obscured by thick river vegetation, and the stone is now only visible during high tides. It is rumored that development workers once removed some of these stones to use as building materials in the town.

== Gallery ==
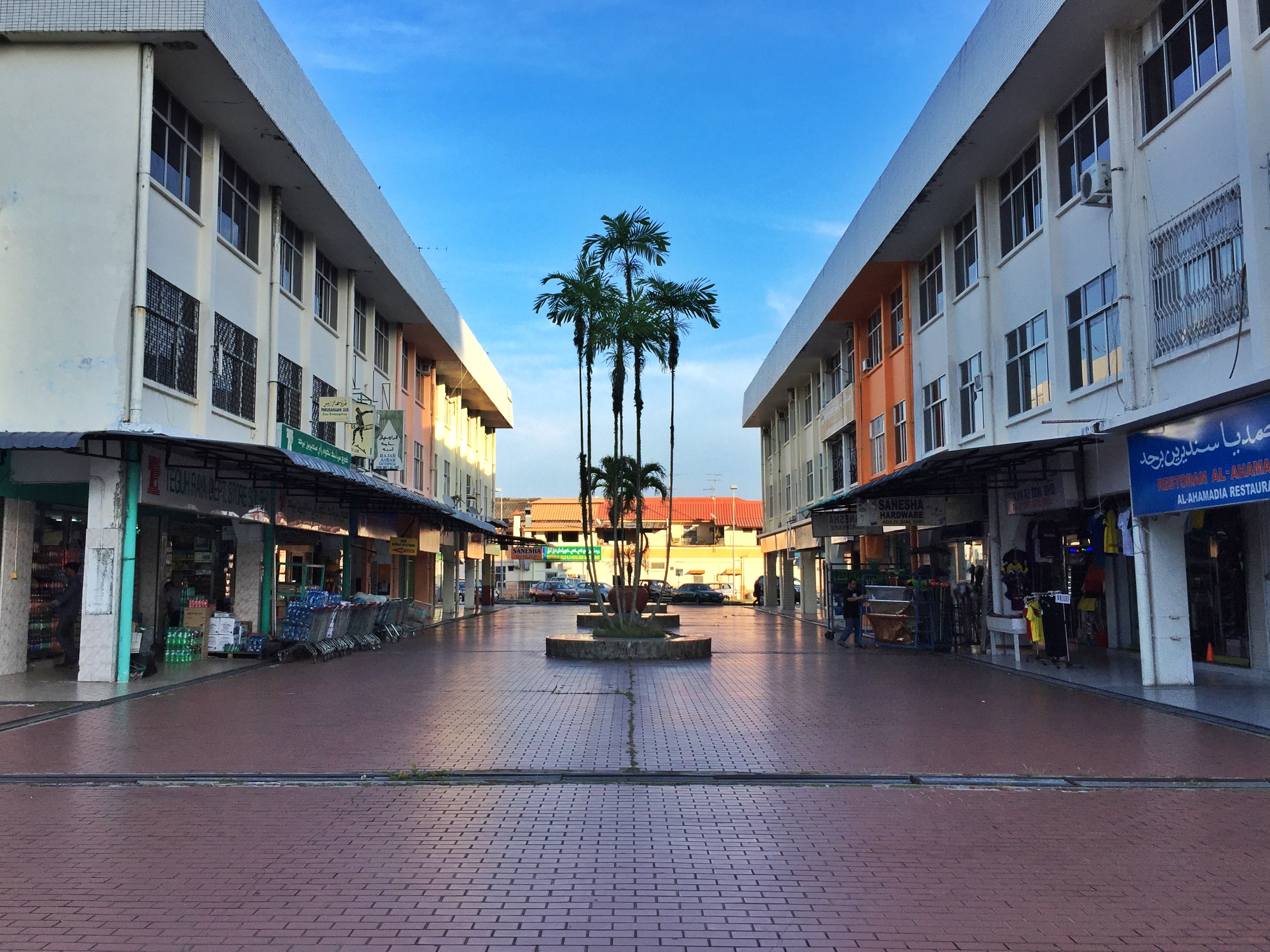
Sri Aman Complex

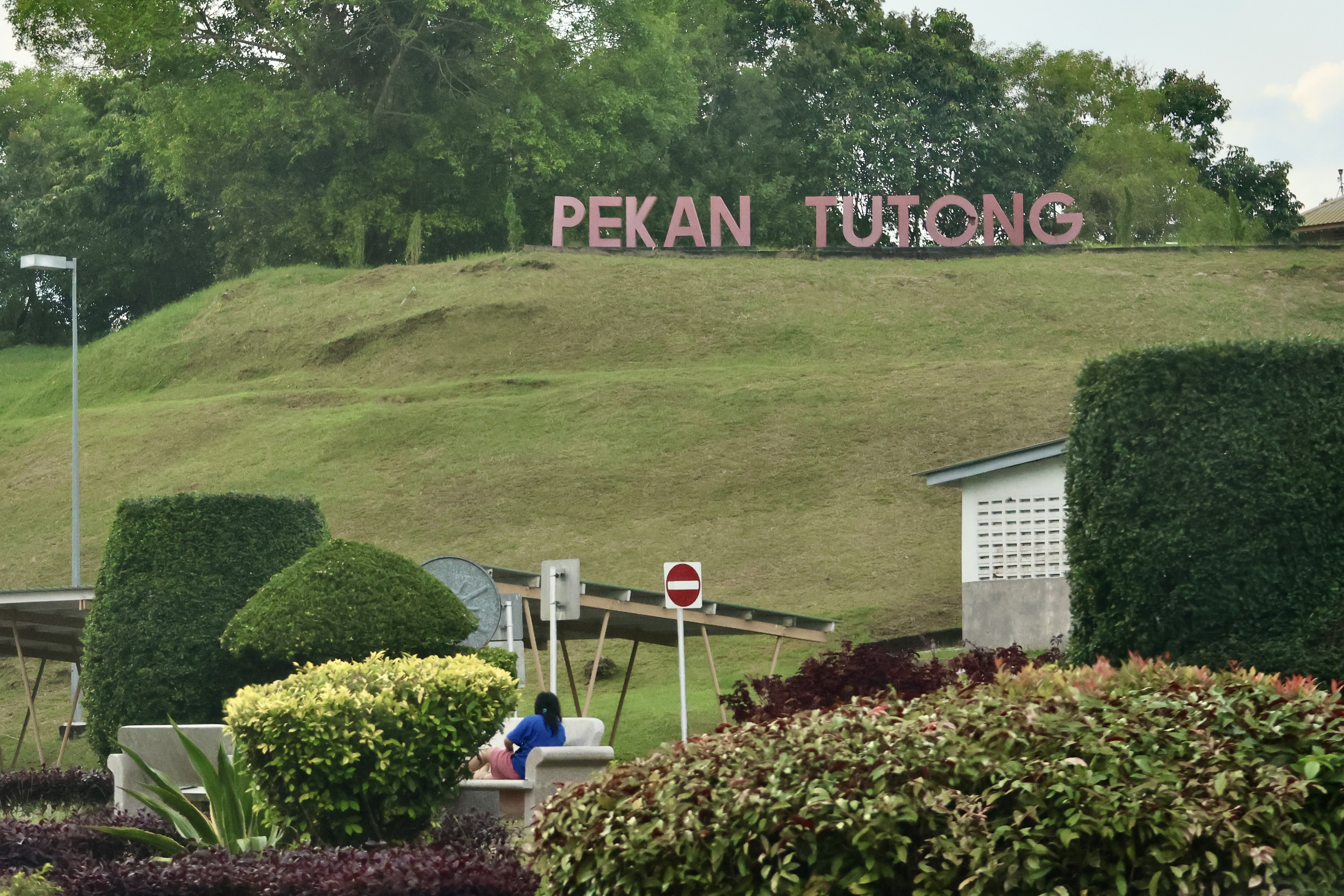
Pekan Tutong signage

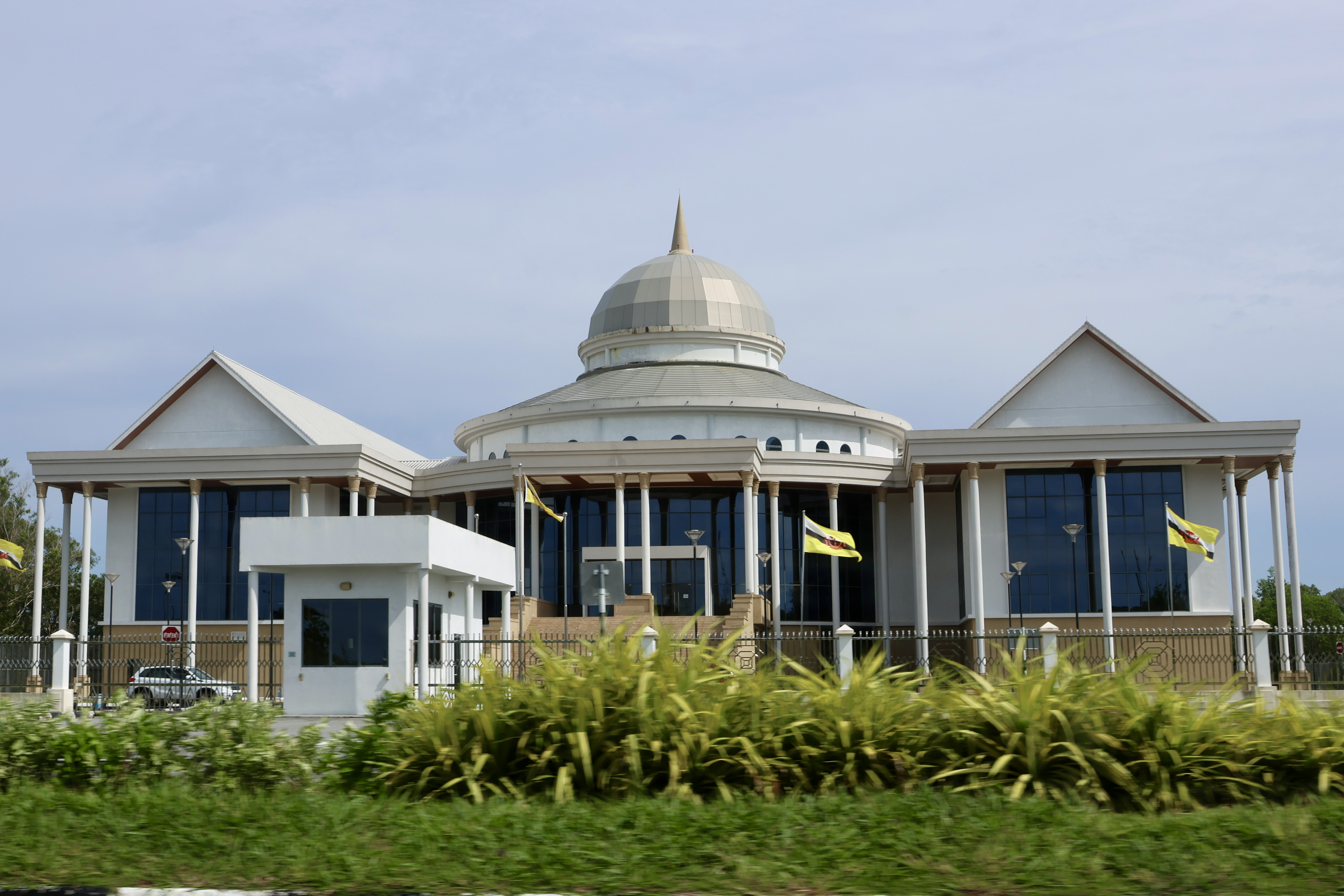
Tutong Syariah Court Building

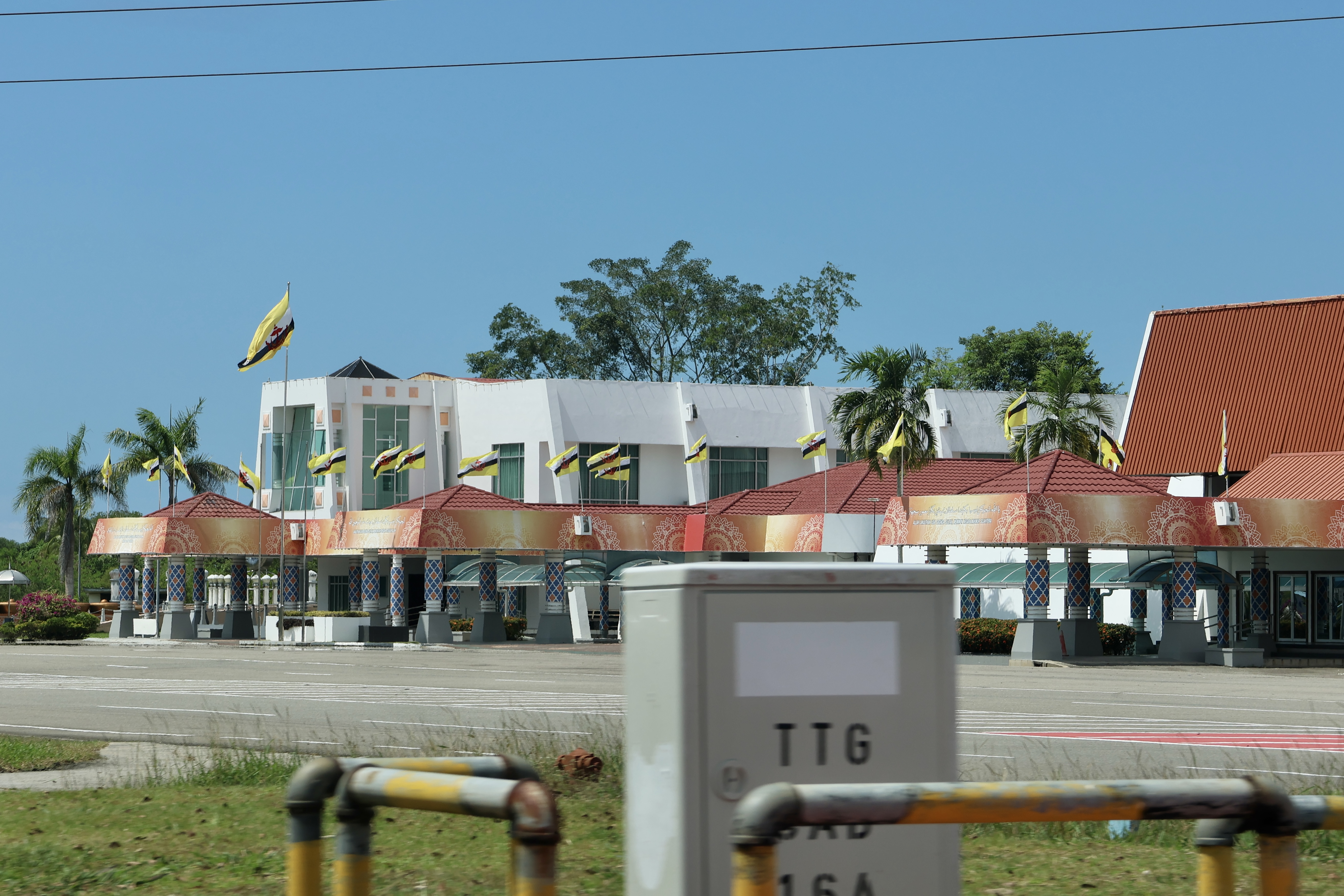
Seri Kenangan Hall

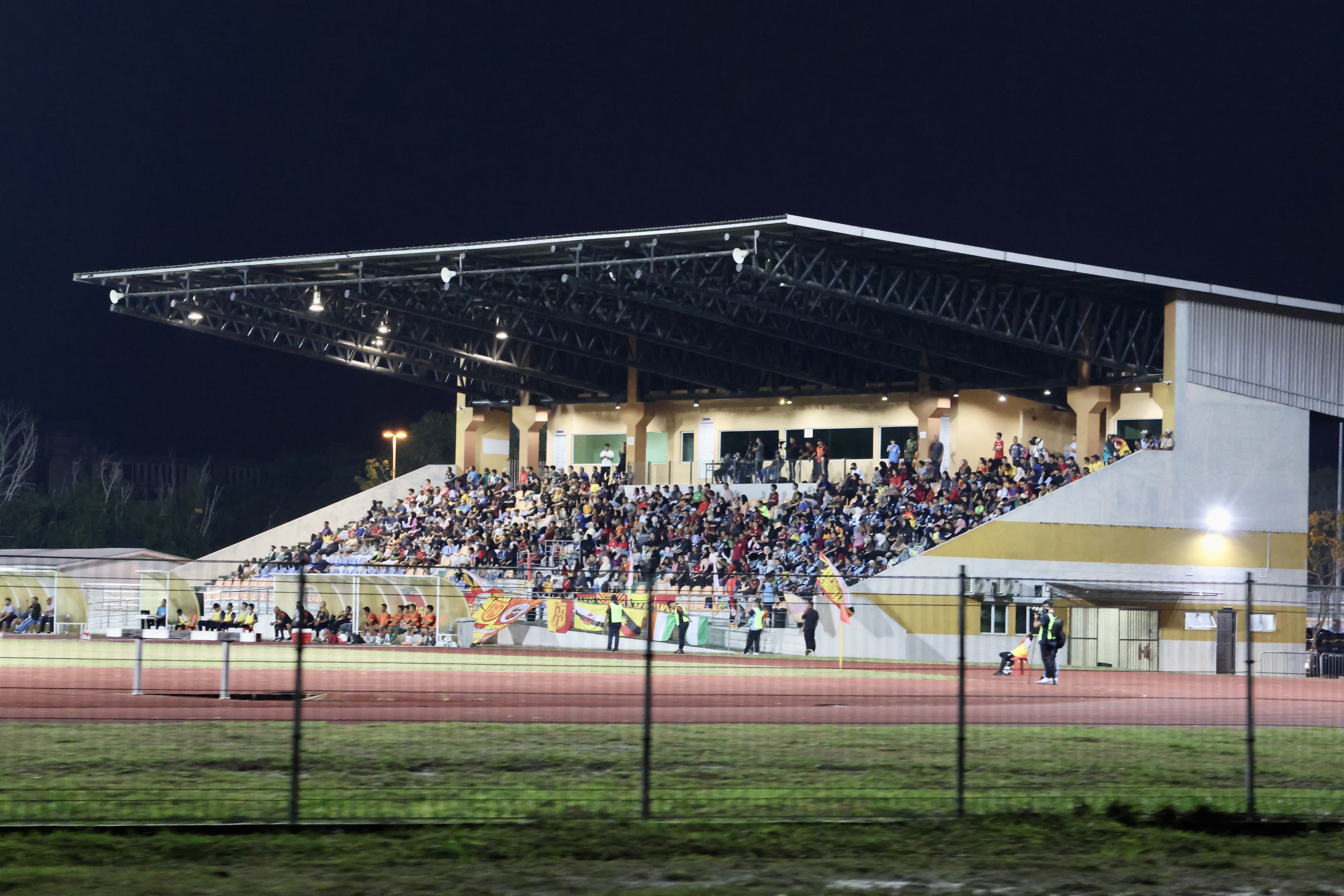
Tutong Sports Complex

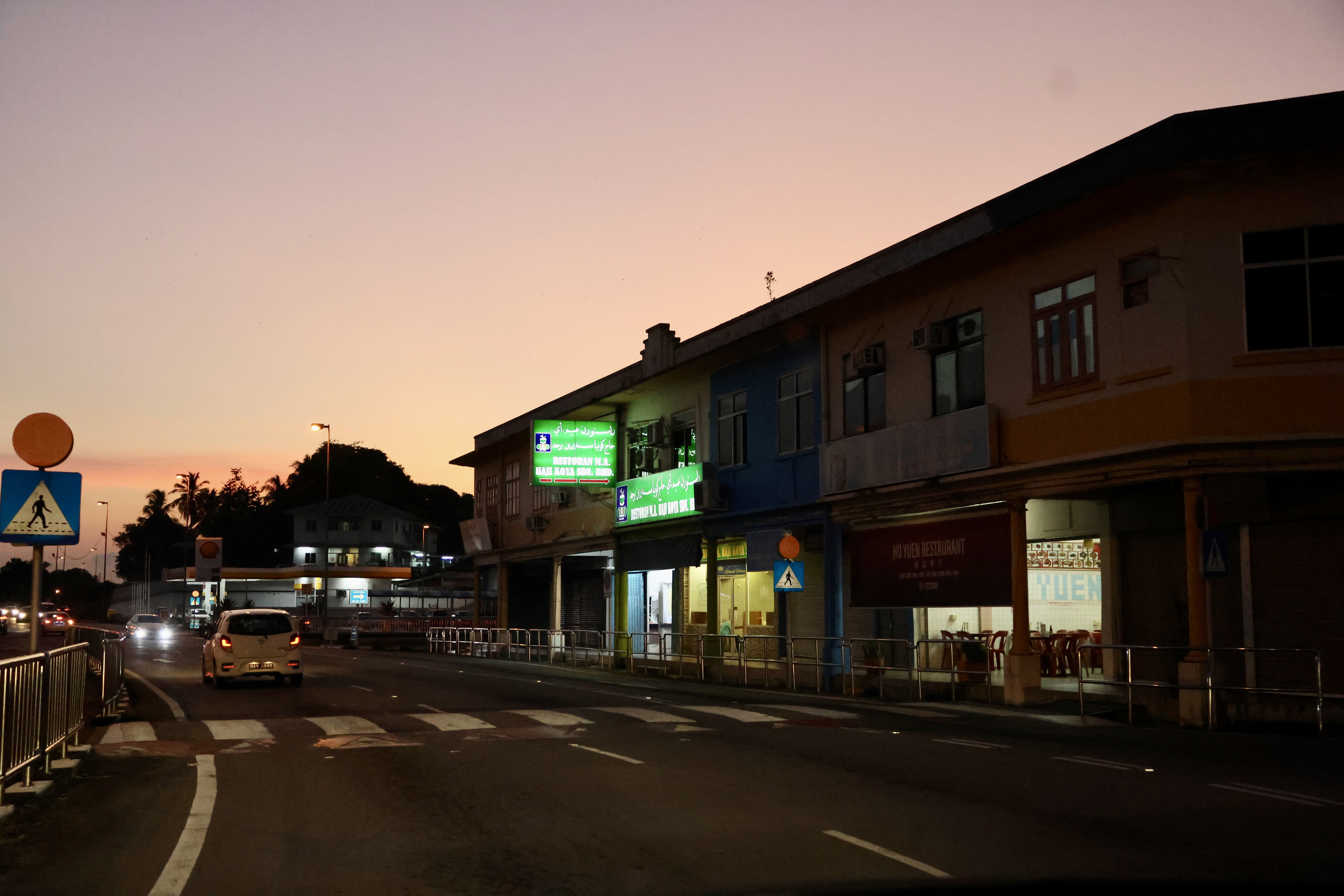
Jalan Enchi Awang

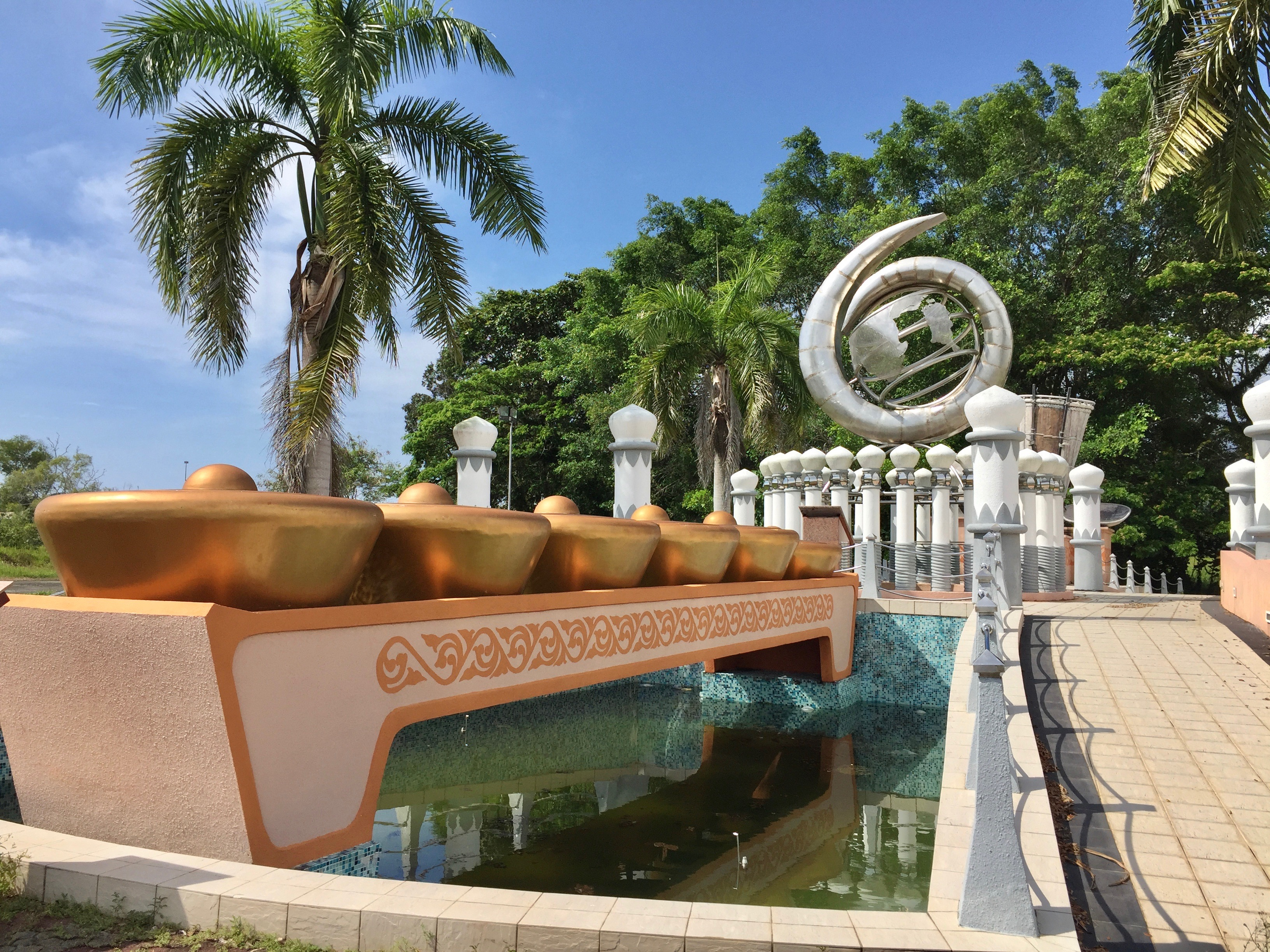
Warisan Emas monument
