= Queenie Chong =

Bruneian businessperson and politician (born 1988)

Yang Berhormat Queenie Chong PIKB
- 莊靜宜
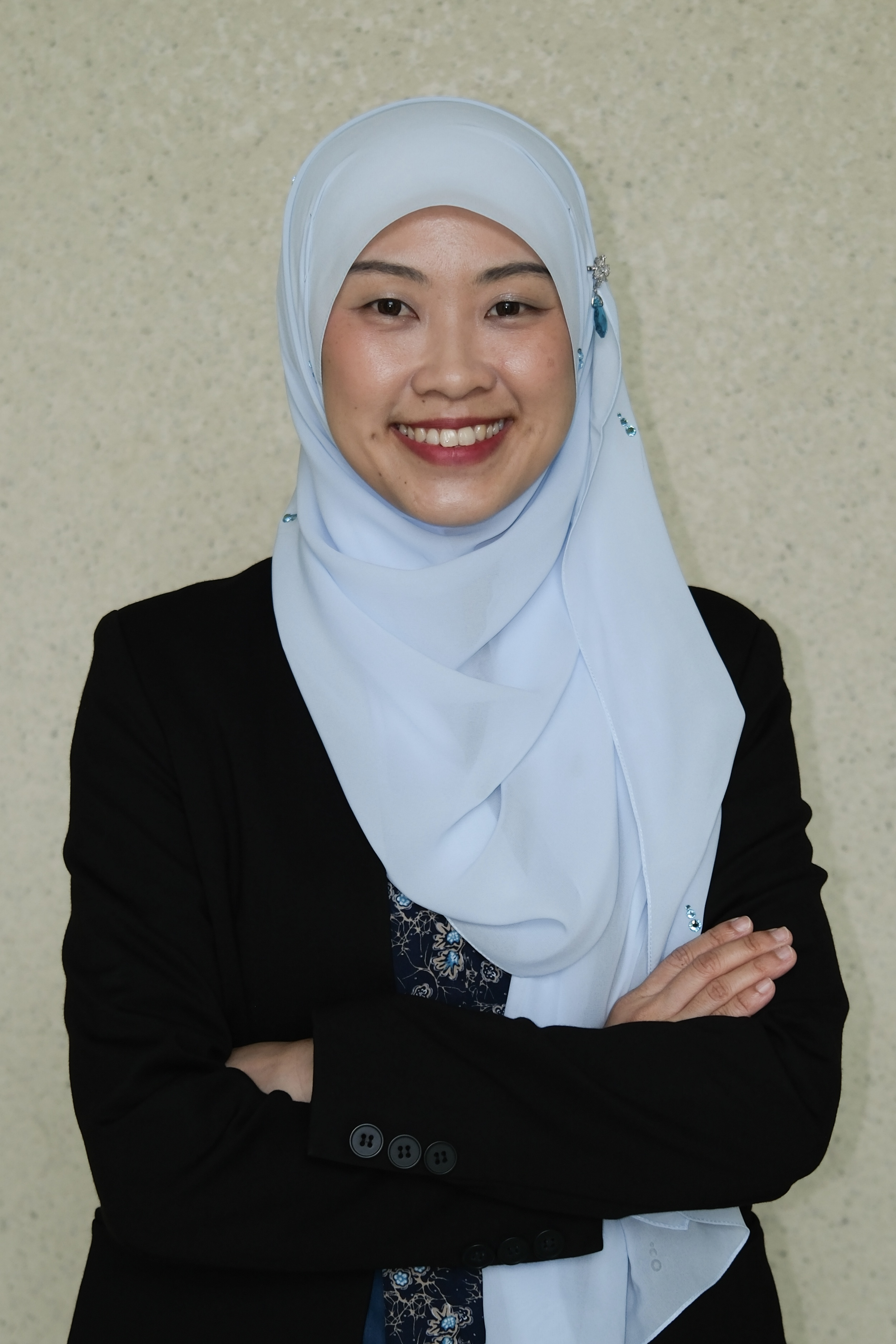
- Chong in 2026

Member of the Legislative Council
- Incumbent
- Assumed office 20 January 2023

Personal details
- Born: Chong Chin Yee; 4 February 1988 (age 38) Tutong District, Brunei
- Education: Sufri Bolkiah Secondary School; Sayyidina 'Othman Secondary School
- Alma mater: Monash University (BEc); Universiti Brunei Darussalam (MEd)
- Occupation: Politician; businesswoman
- Awards: See here
- Website: www.queeniecy.com

Chinese name
- Simplified Chinese: 庄静宜
- Traditional Chinese: 莊靜宜
Transcriptions
Standard Mandarin
- Hanyu Pinyin: Zhuāng Jìngyí
Southern Min
- Hokkien POJ: Chong chǐⁿ-gî

Queenie Chong Chin Yee (Chinese: 莊靜宜; pinyin: Zhuāng Jìngyí; born 4 February 1988) is a Bruneian entrepreneur and politician of Chinese descent who was among the members appointed to the Legislative Council of Brunei (LegCo) in 2023.

Chong was raised in the Tutong District and received housing assistance from the Sultan Haji Hassanal Bolkiah Foundation in 2005. She completed a degree in economics at Monash University and later taught at Tutong Sixth Form Centre. After leaving the Ministry of Education in 2018, Chong participated in the Young Southeast Asian Leaders Initiative program and becoming an Edmund Hillary Fellowship recipient in 2020.

Chong completed the Accelerate DARe program and founded Startup Brunei, which launched UnikLearn to support the employability of youth with disabilities. She also founded the platforms Memori and Mirath for will planning and charitable donations. On 20 January 2023, she was appointed as a member of LegCo on 20 January 2023, with a focus on youth entrepreneurship development, digital and technological literacy, and a future-ready workforce; she officially took her oath of office on 29 January.

== Early life and education ==
Chong was born on 4 February 1988. She and her younger brother grew up with their widowed mother, Khoo Eng Leong, in the Tutong District. They lived in a makeshift hut in Kampong Penabai. The hut was just big enough for a twin bed, a bunk bed, a partially enclosed kitchen, and no bathroom, making it necessary for her family to travel a few minutes to her grandmother's house to access sanitary services. The hut lacked proper lighting for daily tasks such as preparing for school. Despite not having formal education herself, her mother taught her the importance of diligence.

The family had access to the housing aid provided by the Sultan Haji Hassanal Bolkiah Foundation of Kampong Bukit Udal in 2005, which helped improve their standard of living. Chong mentioned that her family had been saved from destitution because of the welfare program. From her account, she was 17 years old and currently in Year 11 at Sufri Bolkiah Secondary School at the time of the housing aid. She was also preparing for her sixth form classes at Sayyidina 'Othman Secondary School of Kampong Bukit Beruang.

In 2011, Chong graduated with a Bachelor of Economics from Monash University in Melbourne. After completing her three-year course, she went back to Brunei where she planned to teach in her former school. Later on, she joined the Ministry of Education (MoE), teaching economics in Tutong Sixth Form Centre. She was one of the delegates at the National Environment Conference in 2014, where she represented Beach Bunch. In 2015, she received a scholarship from the Brunei government to pursue her Master of Education at Universiti Brunei Darussalam.

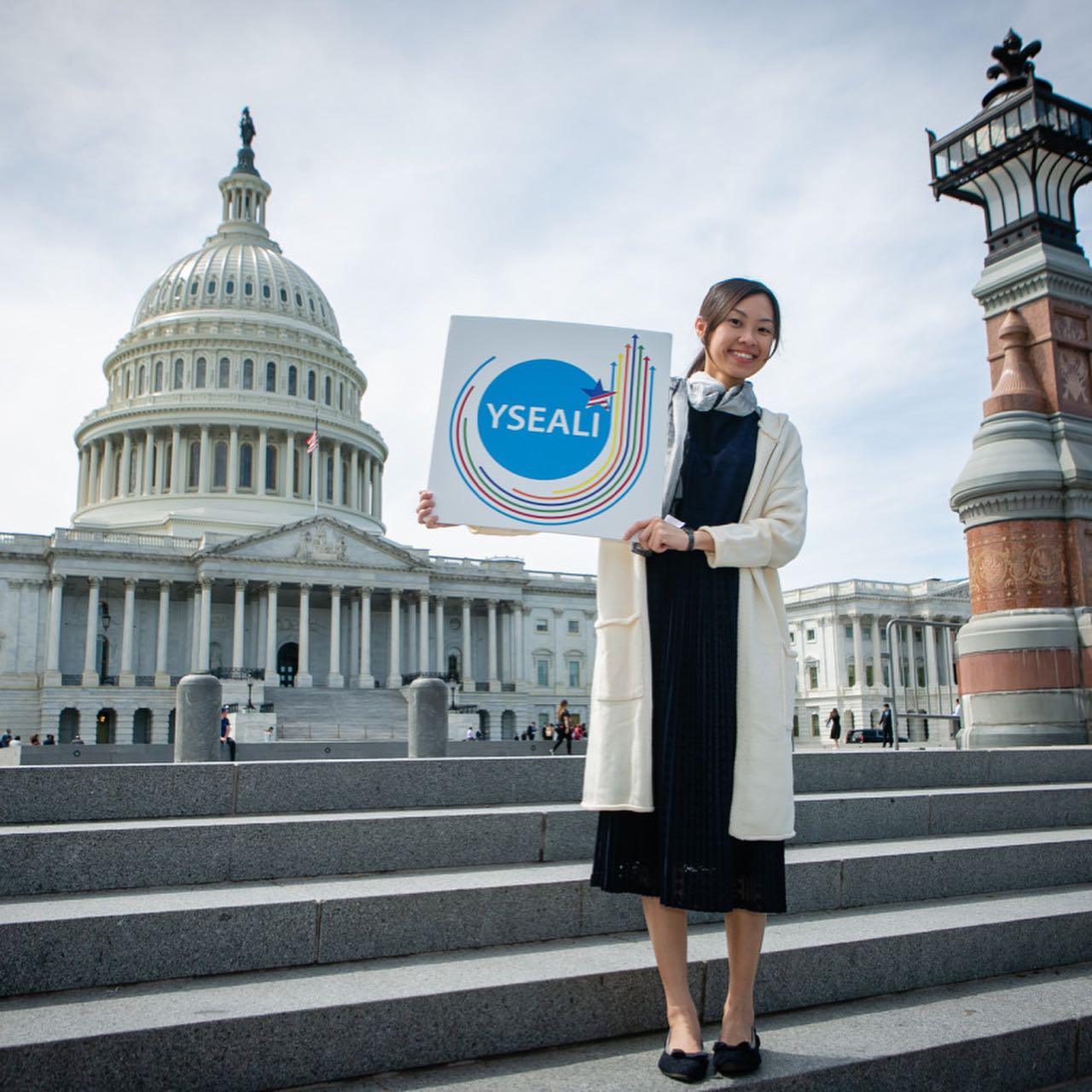
Chong holding a YSEALI sign in front of the United States Capitol in 2019

After working for almost seven years in the MoE, Chong opted out of the role in 2018 as an education officer not due to her disinterest in education, but owing to the high rate of unemployment prevailing at that time and even now. In the same year, she took up an evening class for entrepreneurship at UBD where she studied the basics of business management, especially digital technology. She further attended the Young Southeast Asian Leaders Initiative (YSEALI) Professional Fellowship in Seattle and the regional YSEALI Impact eXL workshop in Indonesia. Chong has become the first person from Brunei to get the Edmund Hillary Fellowship in 2020.

== Business career ==
The Accelerate DARe programme was completed by Chong who, alongside another entrepreneur, formed the venture consultancy firm known as Startup Brunei. As part of its initiatives, Startup Brunei launched a pilot programme named UnikLearn to help young people with disabilities in Brunei achieve employability. Several organisations have shown an interest in providing industrial training opportunities to the beneficiaries of the UnikLearn initiative, which includes persons with autism. According to Chong, industrial restructuring and business model transformation would be important for remaining economically competitive and developing quality job opportunities, while the problem faced in Brunei was one of skills mismatches.

The second round of financing for Memori came in 2019 from Asian royals as the firm was preparing for its soft launch that same year in August. Despite lacking an online platform back then, Memori managed to raise B$158,000 (US$100,000) from the 113 Venture Growth Fund. Memori is expected to operate like an all-in-one online legacy management platform that offers services related to memorialisation, insurance, and wills. The inspiration behind the creation of Memori came from the personal loss of the founder who lost both his grandparents.

In 2021, Memori was classified as being based in Singapore, so that it could participate in a company incubation program. Memori later launched yet another online platform called Mirath, that is involved in cheap will writing, bequeathing services for the Muslim community. Mirath is engaged in offering will-related services, hibah (gift/grant), faraid (Islamic inheritance), as well as funeral management packages or even donating money to mosques. The firm managed to raise over $10,000 in order to help more than 40 poor families. These platforms have been launched in order to serve Southeast Asian countries, where people tend to have very few wills, as it is viewed as an uncomfortable topic. At the "Secawan Kopi Sejuta Bicara" event held on 31 January 2022, Chong discussed success, highlighting courage, perseverance, and concentration as essential ingredients.

== Political career ==
The Sultan Hassanal Bolkiah, nominated Chong to be part of the LegCo on 20 January 2023. Some of her major areas of work included youth entrepreneurship, digital technology knowledge, and preparing a workforce for the future. Chong was sworn in on 29 January.

In her speech delivered at the 19th LegCo session on 4 March 2023, Chong focused on youth digital skills, productivity and innovation, labour market efficiency and workers' rights, lifelong learning, and the adoption of technology by SMEs to enhance global competitiveness. The next day, she acknowledged government efforts through bodies such as the Manpower Planning and Employment Council, the Manpower Industry Steering Committee, and the Lifelong Learning Centre to reduce youth structural unemployment, and called for youths to be resilient and adaptable in a technology-driven economy.

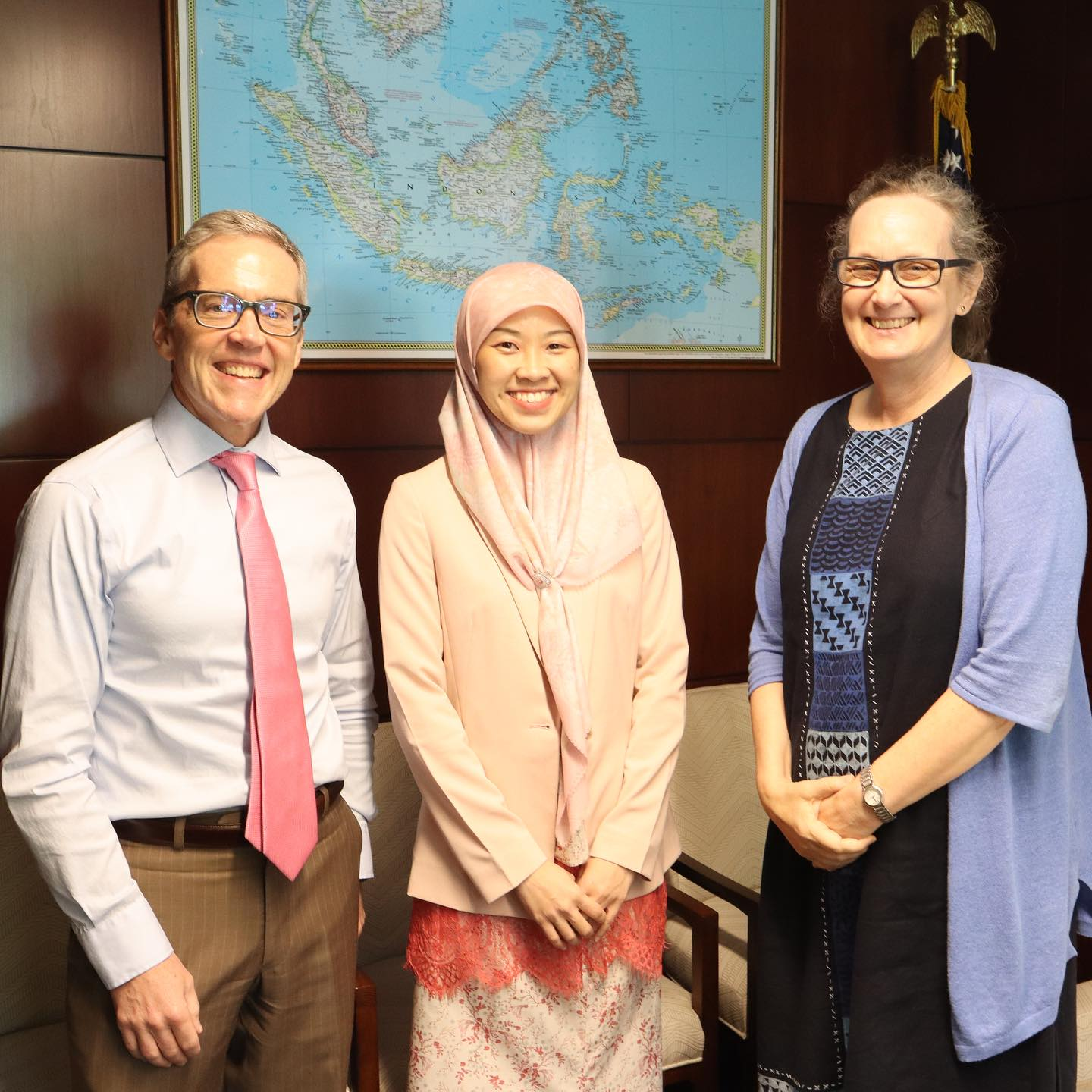
Chong (centre) and Caryn McClelland (right) at the United States embassy in August 2023

On 22 March 2023, Chong discussed healthcare innovation through a Behavioural Insights using data and machine learning for disease prevention and improving elderly healthcare use, and later discussed about digital literacy and a national digital index, alongside expanded digital inclusion and ICT literacy programs. Later in April, she urged students to set ambitious goals and work hard based on experience and knowledge. At the 9th Global Conference of Young Parliamentarians in Hanoi, she assured Brunei's focus on creativity and digitalisation such as the CREATES initiative to advance innovation in AI, big data, and IoT.

In February 2024 in Vientiane, Chong called for women's empowerment in technology and cybersecurity through regional parliamentary engagement and collaboration at the Meeting of the Coordinating Committee of Women Parliamentarians. Later that month, during the "Ladies in Cyber" meeting and the 20th LegCo sessions, she pointed out women's contributions to ICT and cybersecurity, the digital economy and Smart Nation agenda, the Digital Economy Masterplan 2025, ASEAN growth prospects, and the need to assess the impact of digital transformation policies and budgets. Additionally, she recognised the ASEAN growth forecasts, economic changes post-COVID-19, and the evaluation of budgetary and digital transformation results.

In March 2024, Chong suggested several steps to internationalise ambuyat and sago, via inter-ministerial cooperation. She also discussed financial transactions related to the creation of a digital transaction hub in the country, appreciated initiatives toward developing ICT-related education, suggested greater coordination among ministers on issues related to business development and infrastructure development, and advocated the review of the ICT syllabus and communication policies. In the following month, at the "International Women's Day – Future Impact" event, she inaugurated the "DigiThink" initiative to increase digital literacy through online portals in Southeast Asia.

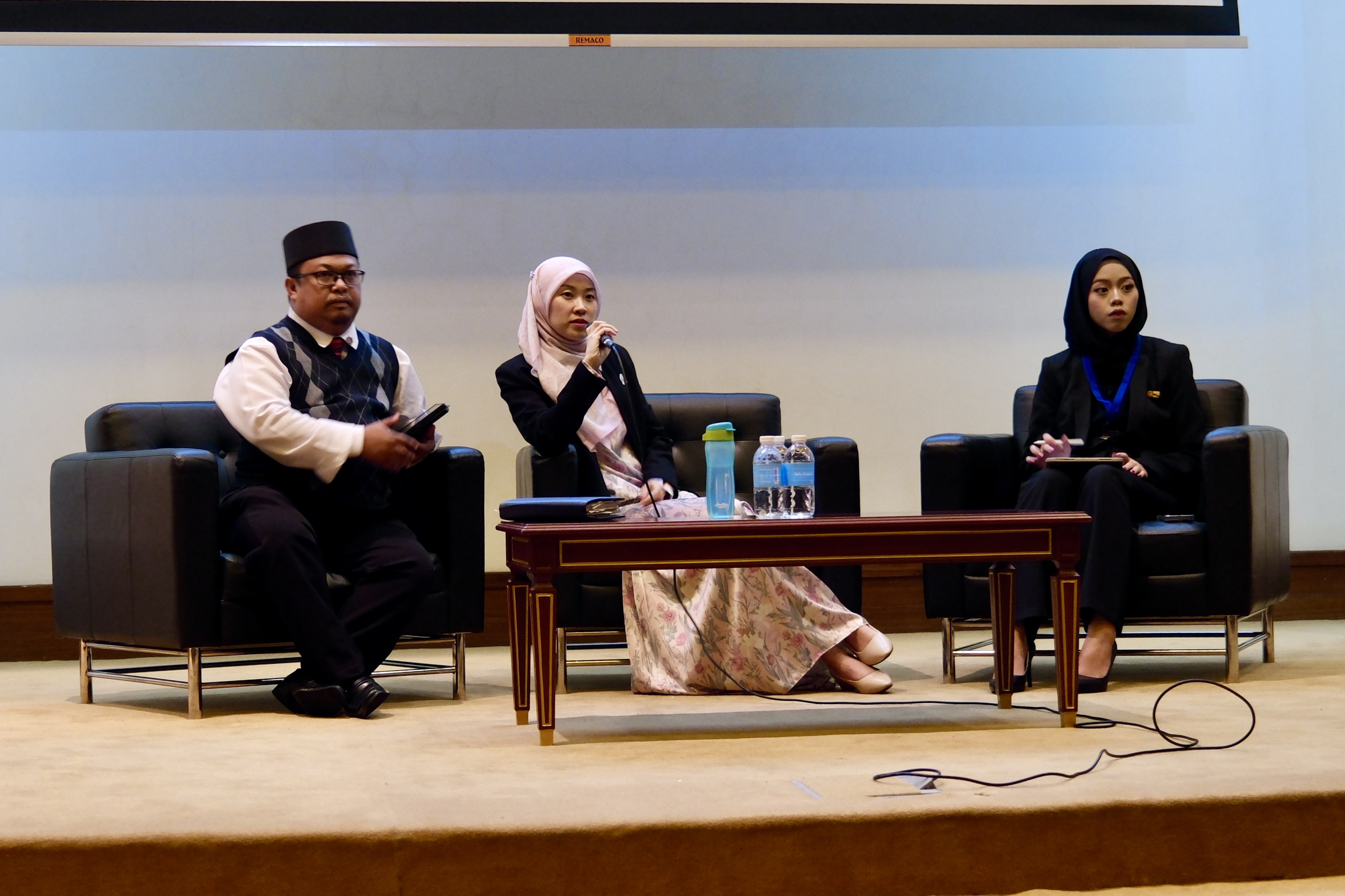
Abdul Aziz Hamdan (left) dan Chong (centre) during the public discussion Uniting Youth Voices in December 2025

In March 2025, at the 21st LegCo session, she addressed several queries concerning the occupancy rate of industrial lands controlled by Brunei Economic Development Board and focused on land usage monitoring and business investment. In May, she took part in the discussion about youth involvement, sustainability, inclusiveness, and application of digital technologies in ASEAN development at the Second Consultative Meeting of AIPA Young Parliamentarians in Klang. She later accompanied the official LegCo delegation in an official visit to China. She participated in the BIMP-EAGA Youth Bus Programme, where she gave a speech on youth as agents of change and involved other participants in discussion about community development and entrepreneurship.

== Recognition and honours ==
Throughout her career, she has received the following:

=== Recognition ===
- Excellent Youth Award (2021)
- Brunei's 50 most inspiring LinkedIn Icon (2020; 2021)
- 30 people to watch in the Business of Law in Asia (2020)
- 30 Women legal innovators in Asia to follow (2022)
- Country Winners of the MCCC-AAET Green Award (2014)
- ASEAN Business Awards (2019)

=== Honours ===
- Excellent Service Medal (PIKB; 25 June 2023)
