= Tutong Sixth Form Centre =

Coordinates: 4°44′28.3″N 114°36′15.7″E

- Pusat Tingkatan Enam Tutong

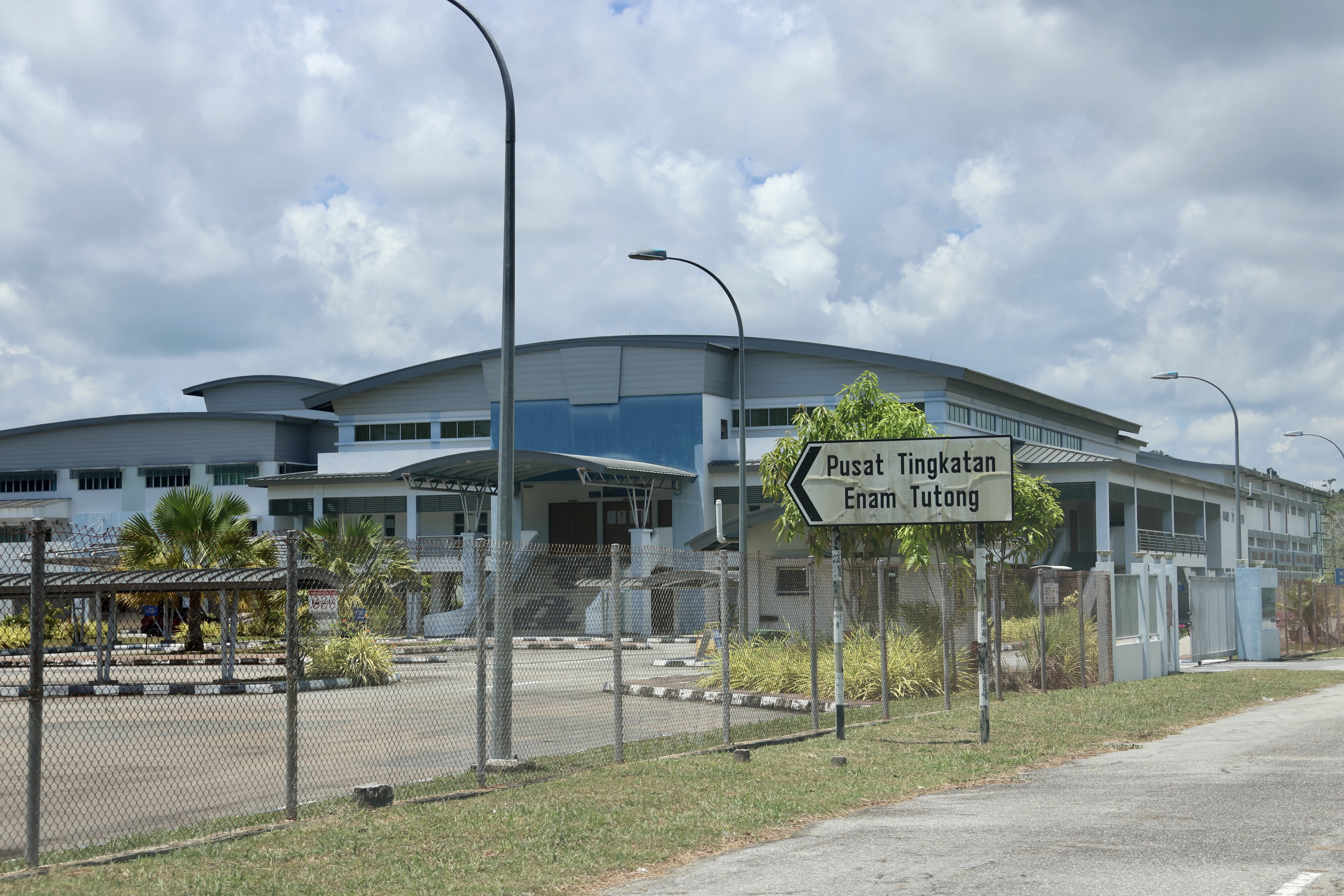
- Bukit Beruang, Tutong, TC3345; Brunei

Information
- School type: Government, Sixth form centre
- Opened: 2012

Tutong Sixth Form Centre (Malay: Pusat Tingkatan Enam Tutong; Malay, abbreviated; PTET) is a sixth form centre in Tutong District, Brunei. It first opened its doors in 2012, and since then, accepts mainly secondary school leavers from the district.

== Background ==
The school campus is located at Bukit Beruang, some 14 kilometres from the town of Tutong and about 60 kilometres from Bandar Seri Begawan.

The construction began in 2009 and took 20 months to complete. It is estimated to have cost roughly 20 million Brunei dollars.

It is the first dedicated sixth form centre in the district. Sixth form education for the district began in 2002 but was run under the administration of Sayyidina 'Othman Secondary School and thus shared facilities with the school's secondary education. In 2012, it moved to the current compound which is not far from its former location.

== Programme ==
Tutong Sixth Form Centre offers GCE A Level programme. Studies usually begin in early March and end with A Level examinations in October and November of the following year.

This sixth form centre mainly enrols students who have completed 4- or 5-year secondary education in the district's five secondary schools — namely Muda Hashim Secondary School, Raja Isteri Pengiran Anak Saleha Secondary School, Sayyidina 'Othman Secondary School, Sufri Bolkiah Secondary School and Tanjong Maya Secondary School — and who wish to pursue sixth form rather than vocational education.

== Facilities ==
The school sits on an area of 15 acres. Facilities that can be found here include:

- Blocks for:
  - Administration
  - Classrooms
  - Science laboratories
  - Art studio and design technology room
- Multi-purpose hall
- Library
- Canteen
- Assembly area
- Athletic field

== Notable staff ==
- Queenie Chong, member of Legislative Council of Brunei
