= Muda Hashim Secondary School =

Public school in Tutong District, Brunei

- Sekolah Menengah Muda Hashim

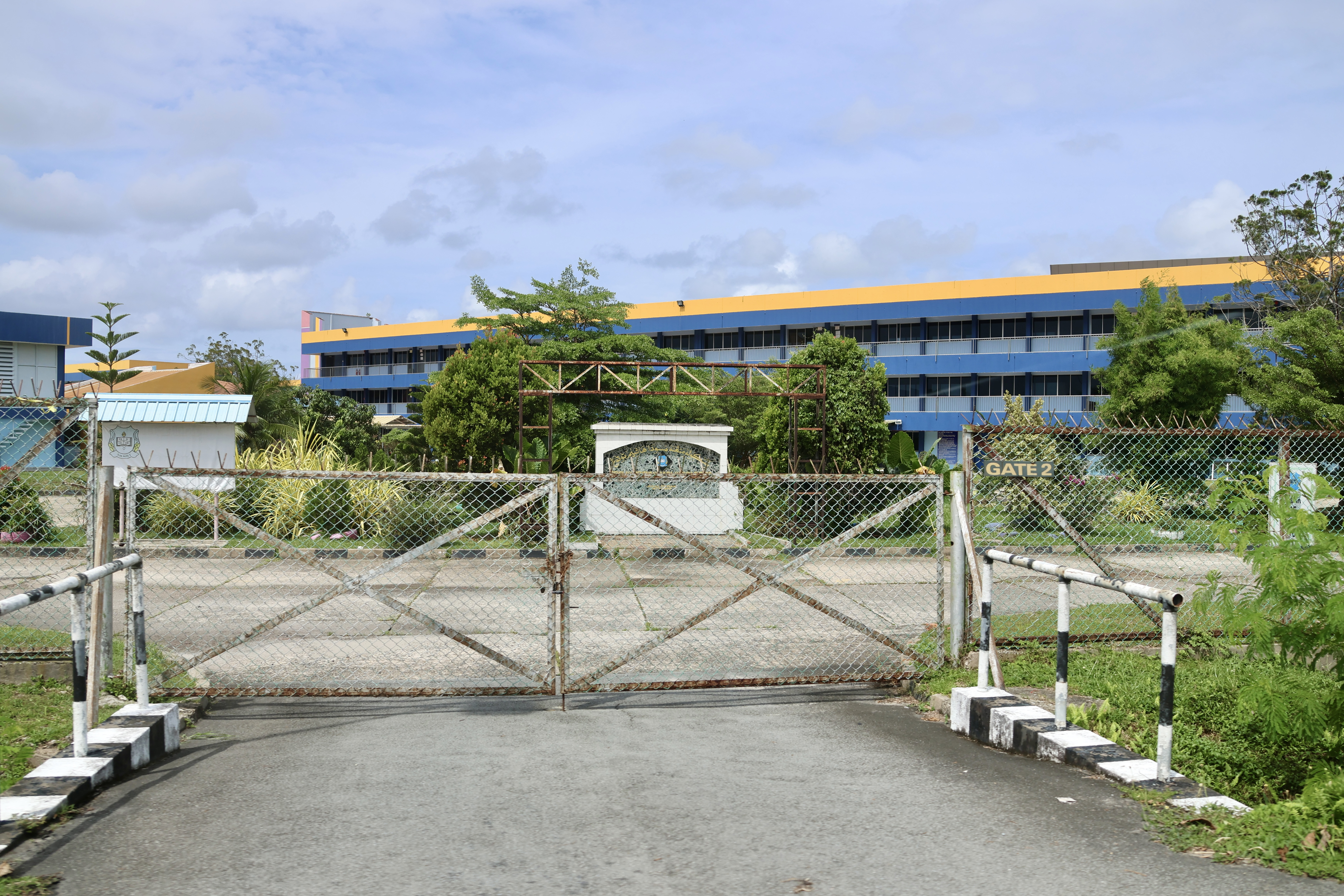
- The school in 2024

Location
- Jalan Sungai Besar; Bukit Bendera; Tutong, TA1341; Brunei; 4°49′07.3″N 114°39′52.7″E

Information
- Former names: Muda Hashim Malay Secondary School (1971–1984)
- Funding type: Government
- Motto: Selalu Memandang ke Hadapan (Always Looking Forward)
- Established: 1 June 1971; 55 years ago
- School district: Cluster 5
- Authority: Ministry of Education
- Principal: Mohamad Saiful Bahrin Sabli
- Teaching staff: 86 (2002)
- Employees: ~25 (2002)
- Years offered: 7–11
- Gender: boys
- Enrollment: 636 (2019)
- Campus size: 75 acres (30 ha)
- Yearbook: Majalah Rentis
- Affiliation: CIE, BTEC

Muda Hashim Secondary School, Tutong (Malay: Sekolah Menengah Muda Hashim, Tutong; SMMHT) is a government boys' secondary school in Bukit Bendera, a village subdivision under Pekan Tutong in Tutong District in Brunei. The school provides five years of general secondary education leading up to O Level qualification. It has 636 students. The current principal is Awang Radiman bin Haji Idris.

== Namesake ==
With the agreement of the Government Schools Education Committee, the school's name was changed in honour of Pengiran Bendahara Seri Maharaja Permaisuara Pengiran Muda Hashim ibni Pengiran Bendahara Pengiran Anak Abdul Rahman (1907–1998). He was a member of the Brunei royal family who served in a number of important capacities, including the Legislative Council, the Privy Council, and the Brunei Islamic Religious Council.

== History ==
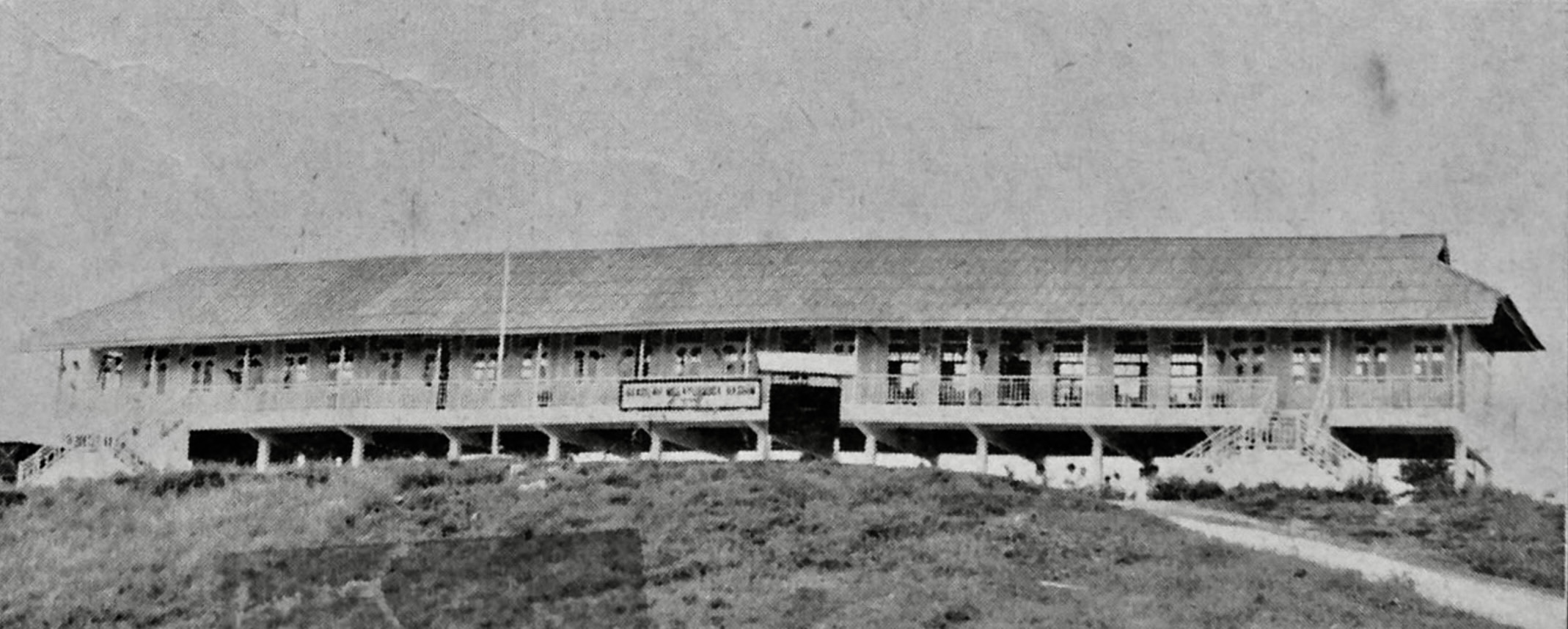
Muda Hashim Malay School, Bukit Bendera, c. 1959

The government's efforts to provide basic education up to primary school level in the Tutong District began in 1918 and were expanded to include lower secondary education in the 1960s. By 1959, the government had established 13 primary schools in the Tutong District, including those in remote villages, with a total of 1,230 students. Students who graduated from grade VI and wished to continue their education at the secondary level had to move to Muda Hashim Malay School in Bukit Bendera, to take grade VII, which was introduced in 1961. As a result, Muda Hashim Malay School, which had previously provided education up to grade VI, expanded its curriculum to include grade VII. All students who graduated from grade VI at other primary schools outside of Tutong town gathered to continue their studies at the secondary level at Muda Hashim Malay School.

In 1961, several secondary classes were introduced at Muda Hashim Malay School, with 97 students (mixed levels) and seven teachers. By 1964, the number of secondary students increased to 145, and the enrolment continued to grow each year. This necessitated the construction of new facilities. However, for those wishing to work in the public sector, their qualifications still provided them with job opportunities and salaries in various fields.

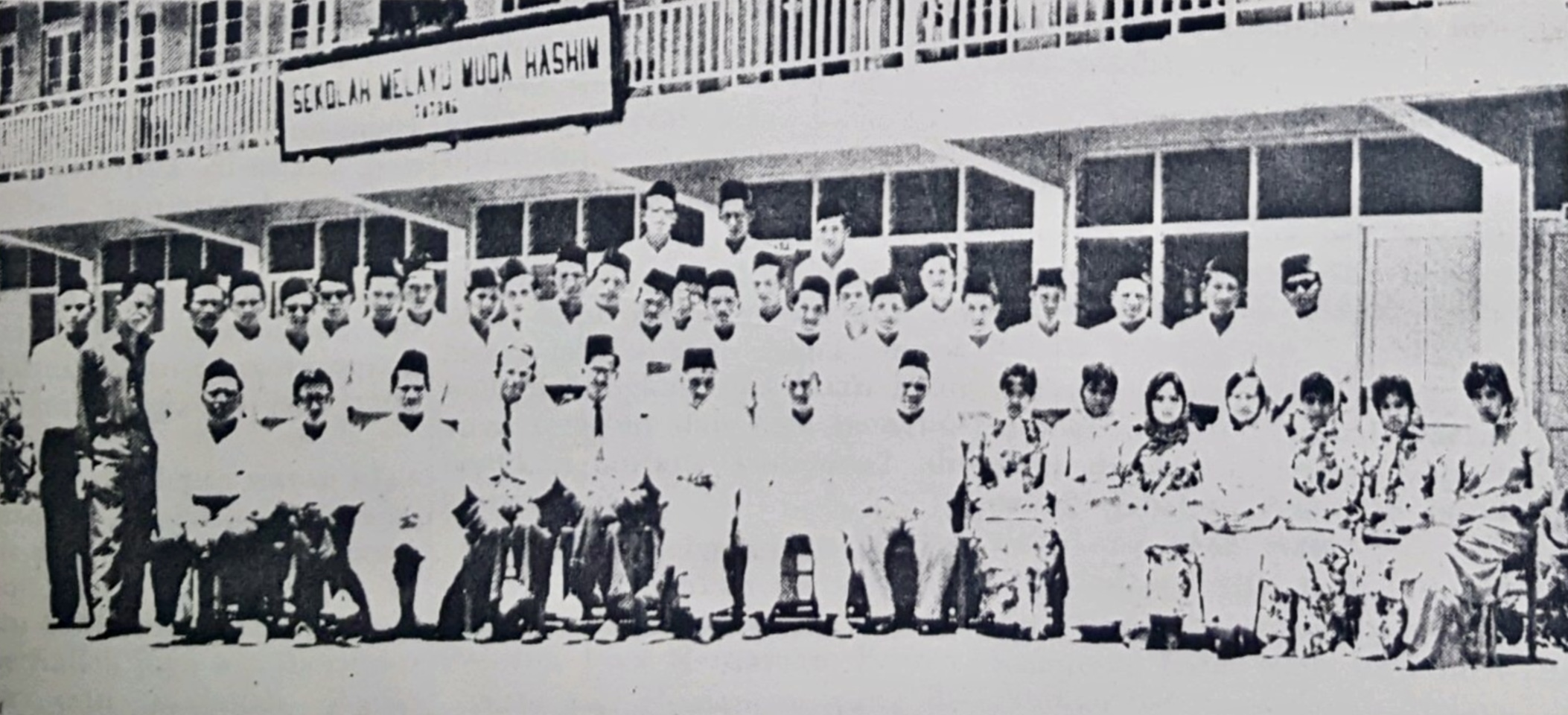
Muda Hashim Malay School staff group photo, c. 1963

In 1966, the government established the first Malay secondary class in the country, located in the capital and known as First Malay Secondary School. This marked the beginning of the secondary education era for Malay students in the country, including those from the Tutong District and other regions. Malay students from the Tutong and Belait districts who wanted to continue their studies to grade VIII had the opportunity to attend this school. In 1967/68, the government began offering secondary classes for Form I and II specifically in the Tutong and Belait districts. In 1968, the class names used at Muda Hashim School were changed to "Form" (i.e., Form I and II). The administration of First Malay Secondary School was separated from the primary school, with Muhammad Taha bin Abdul Rauf becoming the headmaster from 1968 to 1970. By 1970, the secondary school housed students from Forms I, II, and III, with a total of 733 students and 35 teachers.

On 1 June 1971, with approval from the Department of Education, the entire building and its grounds were officially handed over to the school, which retained its name and began managing its administration independently. The school moved to a new complex in the Sungai Basong area and was officially renamed Muda Hashim Malay Secondary School (also known as First Malay Secondary School) on 1 May 1971. (Note: According to a 1996 school magazine, the school was renamed on 25 March 1970.) The students, teachers, and educational activities were temporarily relocated from the primary school building to the premises of Sekolah Anika Jurusan Tutong. The total area of the school grounds spans 75 acres (30 ha). On the day of relocation, only 40 male students were accommodated in the school's hostel. The first principal, appointed in 1971, was Adam bin Haji Tarif. At that time, the school had 46 teachers, 607 students, and 26 classes across Forms I, II, and III, with 100 male students placed in the boys' hostel and 81 female students in the girls' hostel.

In 1972, the school established Form IV classes and began admitting students from Ahmad Tajuddin Malay Secondary School in Kuala Belait, who had graduated from Form III, to reduce the student concentration at Paduka Seri Begawan Sultan Malay College in Jalan Muara. That year, 100 upper secondary students from Belait District were also admitted to the school to elevate its status as a secondary school. However, by 1979, students from Belait District no longer attended the school, as two secondary schools in the district were able to offer Form IV and V. In 1973, Muda Hashim Malay Secondary School entered 83 students for the Malaysian Certificate of Education exams, but only 10 students passed with a grade of 3, 18 passed at the GCE Ordinary Level, and 55 failed.

In 1980, Muda Hashim Malay Secondary School introduced Form VI classes, though these were discontinued the following year, and students were transferred to the Sixth Form Centre in Gadong. From 1981 to 1982, the school continued to accommodate sixth-form students. In 1984, the school introduced an English-medium section, marking the beginning of its transition to a fully English-medium school over the next five years. In the same year, the school's name was changed to Muda Hashim Secondary School, Tutong. In 1986, the Brunei Junior Certificate of Education examination was introduced, followed by the GCE Ordinary Level exams in 1988.

By 1991, Malay-medium students graduated, marking the final year for the Malay-medium section. However, in May 1994, the number of students decreased as 227 lower secondary students and 14 teachers were transferred to a new school in Kampong Perpindahan Bukit Beruang, known as Sayyidina 'Othman Secondary School. On 31 January 1998, as part of the policy to separate male and female students, Muda Hashim Malay Secondary School became an all-boys school, with female students transferred to Sufri Bolkiah Secondary School, which was specifically for girls. In 1996, the school celebrated its silver jubilee, marking 25 years since the current building was in use. As of 2002, the school employed 86 teachers and had 936 students, with the total number of laboratory and other staff, including cooks and labourers, exceeding 25.

== Governance and structure ==
=== Cooperative ===
The school has a cooperative society that was established and registered with the Department of Cooperative Development on 16 January 1992 under the Cooperative Societies Act of 1975. Its members consist of teachers and students of the school. The cooperative started its business at the school canteen, selling food and beverages as well as stationery, school uniforms, badges, Hari Raya greeting cards, and souvenirs. The school organised educational visits to several cooperative stores in the country, as well as seminars, courses, and workshops on cooperative leadership, understanding, and policies both locally and internationally. Due to their involvement and active management of the cooperative, the society was awarded the title of Koperasi Cergas Tahun 1994.

=== Logo ===
The school's logo was created by the first principal with its motto "selalu memandang ke hadapan" (always looking forward), using the colours blue, yellow, and red. The blue colour signifies love for the nation, religion, and country. Yellow represents the greatness and glory of the nation, while red signifies activity and enthusiasm. The rice symbol represents the nation's prosperity. The thick book symbol represents the building of knowledge that is endless. The torch signifies illuminating the path of the students. The spike at the top right represents intellectual power, while the bottom right spike symbolises bilingualism. The bottom left spike represents education for both male and female students. Meanwhile, the excelsior symbol signifies always looking ahead and striving upwards.

== Academics ==
The school provides secondary education which begins at Year 7. Generally, students will study for five years, that is until Year 11. However, a few students may opt to finish in only four years, that is by Year 10, through the 'Express' scheme of the SPN-21. Either way, the studies culminate in the sitting of GCE O Level and/or IGCSE examination.

Academic Programmes include a 2-year common curriculum in year 7 and 8, then proceed to either the express programme, general programme, applied programme & special applied programme. In the special Applied Programmes, students are able to take Pearson BTEC courses at up to level 2.

The school also believes in inclusive education where students with special needs are either going through the same programme as other students or a specialized pre Vocational programme within the school itself.

Some students may proceed to sixth form, in which students that reside in this district shall enrol in the Tutong Sixth form Centre. Others may proceed to the technical and vocational schools, particularly schools under the Institute of Brunei Technical Education, which are outside of the district.

== See also ==
- List of secondary schools in Brunei
