= List of secondary schools in Brunei =

This is a list of secondary schools in Brunei.

The schools may be a general secondary school, which leads to GCE 'O' Level and IGCSE qualifications, or in the Arabic religious stream, culminating in the sitting of Sijil Pelajaran Ugama Brunei (Brunei Religious Education Certificate) examination.

There are only eight schools which are single-sex: five of them are girls' schools and three are boys' schools.

Most of the schools are government schools. These schools have been established, owned and funded by the Brunei government. Also, students' admission into these schools does not incur tuition fees.

Whether it is government or private, almost all schools have standardised curriculum, which are set by the Ministry of Education for general schools, and the Department of Islamic Studies, Ministry of Religious Affairs for schools in the Arabic religious stream. Nevertheless, international schools are an exception.

List of secondary schools in Brunei
Name	Name in Malay	Abbreviation	Funding	Stream	Gender	Location (District)
Anthony Abell College	Maktab Anthony Abell	AAC	government	general	mixed	Belait
Awang Semaun Secondary School	Sekolah Menengah Awang Semaun	SMAS	government	general	mixed	Brunei-Muara
Belait Arabic School	Sekolah Arab Belait		government	Arabic religious	mixed	Belait
Berakas Secondary School	Sekolah Menengah Berakas	SMB	government	general	mixed	Brunei-Muara
Chung Ching Middle School	Sekolah Menengah Chung Ching	CCMS	private	general	mixed	Belait
Chung Hua Middle School, Kuala Belait	Sekolah Menengah Chung Hua, Kuala Belait	CHMS, KB	private	general	mixed	Belait
Chung Hwa Middle School, Bandar Seri Begawan	Sekolah Menengah Chung Hwa, Bandar Seri Begawan	CHMS, BSB	private	general	mixed	Brunei-Muara
Institut Tahfiz Al-Qur'an Sultan Haji Hassanal Bolkiah	Institut Tahfiz Al-Qur'an Sultan Haji Hassanal Bolkiah	ITQSHHB	government	Arabic religious	mixed	Brunei-Muara
International School Brunei	Sekolah Antarabangsa Brunei	ISB	private	general	mixed	Brunei-Muara
Jerudong International School	Sekolah Antarabangsa Jerudong	JIS	private	general	mixed	Brunei-Muara
Katok Secondary School	Sekolah Menengah Katok		government	general	mixed	Brunei-Muara
Lambak Kiri Secondary School	Sekolah Menengah Lambak Kiri		government	general	mixed	Brunei-Muara
Ma'had Islam Brunei	Ma'had Islam Brunei		government	Arabic religious	boys	Tutong
Masin Secondary School	Sekolah Menengah Masin		government	general	mixed	Brunei-Muara
Menglait Secondary School	Sekolah Menengah Menglait	SMMG	government	general	mixed	Brunei-Muara
Muda Hashim Secondary School	Sekolah Menengah Muda Hashim	SMMHT	government	general	boys	Tutong
Paduka Seri Begawan Sultan Science College	Maktab Sains Paduka Seri Begawan Sultan	MSPSBS	government	general	mixed	Brunei-Muara
Pehin Datu Seri Mahajara Secondary School	Sekolah Menengah Pehin Datu Seri Maharaja	SMPDSM	government	general	mixed	Brunei-Muara
Pengiran Anak Puteri Hajah Masna Secondary School	Sekolah Menengah Pengiran Anak Puteri Hajah Masna	SMPAPHM	government	general	girls	Brunei-Muara
Pengiran Anak Puteri Hajah Rashidah Sa'adatul Bolkiah Secondary School	Sekolah Menengah Pengiran Anak Puteri Hajah Rashidah Sa'adatul Bolkiah	SMPAPHRSB	government	general	mixed	Belait
Pengiran Isteri Hajjah Mariam Secondary School	Sekolah Menengah Pengiran Isteri Hajjah Mariam	SMPIHM	government	general	mixed	Brunei-Muara
Pengiran Jaya Negara Pengiran Haji Abu Bakar Secondary School	Sekolah Menengah Pengiran Jaya Negara Pengiran Haji Abu Bakar	SMPJNPHAB	government	general	mixed	Belait
Perdana Wazir Secondary School	Sekolah Menengah Perdana Wazir		government	general	mixed	Belait
Raja Isteri Girls' High School	Sekolah Tinggi Perempuan Raja Isteri	STPRI	government	general	girls	Brunei-Muara
Raja Isteri Pengiran Anak Damit Girls' Arabic Religious Secondary School	Sekolah Ugama Arab Menengah Perempuan Raja Isteri Pengiran Anak Damit	SUAMPRIPAD	government	Arabic religious	girls	Brunei-Muara
Raja isteri Pengiran Anak Hajah Saleha Girls' Secondary Arabic Religious School	Sekolah Ugama Arab Menengah Perempuan Raja Isteri Pengiran Anak Hajah Saleha	SUAMPRIPAHS	government	Arabic religious	girls	Brunei-Muara
Raja Isteri Pengiran Anak Saleha Secondary School	Sekolah Menengah Raja Isteri Pengiran Anak Saleha	SM RIPAS	government	general	mixed	Tutong
Rimba Secondary School	Sekolah Menengah Rimba	SMR	government	general	mixed	Brunei-Muara
Rimba II Secondary School	Sekolah Menengah Rimba II	SMRII	government	general	mixed	Brunei-Muara
Sayyidina Abu Bakar Secondary School	Sekolah Menengah Sayyidina Abu Bakar	SMSAB	government	general	mixed	Brunei-Muara
Sayyidina Ali Secondary School	Sekolah Menengah Sayyidina Ali	SMSA	government	general	mixed	Belait
Sayyidina Hasan Secondary School	Sekolah Menengah Sayyidina Hasan		government	general	mixed	Brunei-Muara
Sayyidina Husain Secondary School	Sekolah Menengah Sayyidina Husain		government	general	mixed	Brunei-Muara
Sayyidina 'Othman Secondary School	Sekolah Menengah Sayyidina 'Othman	SMSO	government	general	mixed	Tutong
Sayyidina Umar Al-Khattab Secondary School	Sekolah Menengah Sayyidina Umar Al-Khattab	SMSUA	government	general	mixed	Brunei-Muara
St. Andrew's School	Sekolah St. Andrew		private	general	mixed	Brunei-Muara
St. Angela's School	Sekolah St. Angela		private	general	mixed(used to be girls)	Belait
St. George's School	Sekolah St. George		private	general	mixed	Brunei-Muara
St. James' School	Sekolah St. James		private	general	mixed	Belait
St. John's School	Sekolah St. John		private	general	mixed	Belait
St. Margaret's School	Sekolah St. Margaret	SMS	private	general	mixed	Belait
Seri Mulia Sarjana School	Sekolah Seri Mulia Sarjana	SMSS	private	general	mixed	Brunei-Muara
Sufri Bolkiah Secondary School	Sekolah Menengah Sufri Bolkiah	SMSB	government	general	girls	Tutong
Sultan Hassan Secondary School	Sekolah Menengah Sultan Hassan		government	general	mixed	Temburong
Sultan Muhammad Jamalul Alam Secondary School	Sekolah Menengah Sultan Muhammad Jamalul Alam	SM SMJA	government	general	mixed	Brunei-Muara
Sultan Sharif Ali Secondary School	Sekolah Menengah Sultan Sharif Ali	SMSSA	government	general	mixed	Brunei-Muara
Sultan Omar Ali Saifuddien College	Maktab Sultan Omar Ali Saifuddien	SOASC	government	general	boys	Brunei-Muara
Tanjong Maya Secondary School	Sekolah Menengah Tanjong Maya	SMTM	government	general	mixed	Tutong
Temburong Arabic Preparatory School	Sekolah Persediaan Arab Temburong		government	Arabic religious	mixed	Temburong
Yayasan Sultan Haji Hassanal Bolkiah Secondary School	Sekolah Menengah Yayasan Sultan Haji Hassanal Bolkiah		private	general	mixed	Brunei-Muara
