= Edmund Hillary Fellowship =

New Zealand entrepreneurship organisation

The Edmund Hillary Fellowship is a fellowship programme for entrepreneurs, investors and startup teams in New Zealand. The idea behind the Fellowship was to bring foreign entrepreneurs and investors to New Zealand to incubate new businesses. The Immigration New Zealand partnered with the Edmund Hillary Fellowship to deliver the Global Impact Visa to 400 international applications over four years. It was set up in 2016 and has 532 fellows (400 international and 132 kiwis) as of March 2022.

Yoseph Ayele is one of the co-founders of the Edmund Hillary Fellowship and was the first CEO as well.

Fellows of this Fellowship include Deepa Malik, Amitabh Kant, and Queenie Chong.
