= Sultan Sharif Ali Secondary School =

- Sekolah Menengah Sultan Sharif Ali

Location
- Simpang 612, Jalan Muara; Salambigar, Brunei-Muara, BC1515; Brunei
- Coordinates: 4°58′11.2″N 114°59′14.9″E

Information
- School type: government, secondary
- Opened: 4 June 1990
- School district: Cluster 4
- Authority: Ministry of Education
- Grades: Years 7-11
- Gender: mixed

Sultan Sharif Ali Secondary School (Malay: Sekolah Menengah Sultan Sultan Sharif Ali; abbreviated as SMSSA) is a government secondary school located in Salambigar in Brunei-Muara District, Brunei. The school provides five years of secondary education, leading up to GCE 'O' Level qualification.

== Name ==
The school is named after Sultan Sharif Ali, the third Sultan of Brunei who ruled in the 15th century.

== History ==
Located around 12 kilometres (7.5 mi) from Bandar Seri Begawan, Kampong Salambigar Secondary School was established in 1987. The school began admitting students on 4 June 1990. The students previously studied at Pengiran Isteri Hajjah Mariam Secondary School, Sultan Omar Ali Saifuddien College, Raja Isteri Girls' High School and Sultan Muhammad Jamalul Alam Secondary School. It was renamed the Sultan Sharif Ali Secondary School on 25 September 1992 in honour of the third Sultan of Brunei.

== See also ==
- List of secondary schools in Brunei
