= Masin Secondary School =

- Sekolah Menengah Masin

Location
- Masin, Brunei-Muara, BH2723; Brunei
- Coordinates: 4°50′23.6″N 114°50′29.0″E

Information
- School type: Secondary School
- School district: Cluster 2
- Principal: Cikgu Ivan Moore
- Grades: Years 7-11

Masin Secondary School (Malay: Sekolah Menengah Masin) is a government secondary school located in Masin, a village in Brunei-Muara District, Brunei. The school provides five years of secondary education, leading up to GCE 'O' Level examination.

== See also ==
- List of secondary schools in Brunei
