= Raja Isteri Pengiran Anak Saleha Secondary School =

- Sekolah Menengah Raja Isteri Pengiran Anak Saleha

Location
- Jalan Kuala Abang; Birau, Tutong, TE2143; Brunei
- Coordinates: 4°47′32.2″N 114°45′41.6″E

Information
- School type: Government
- Established: 24 November 1988; 37 years ago
- Founder: Raja Isteri Saleha
- Authority: Ministry of Education (Brunei)
- Grades: Years 7-11
- Gender: Coeducational

Raja Isteri Pengiran Anak Saleha Secondary School (Malay: Sekolah Menengah Raja Isteri Pengiran Anak Saleha) is a government secondary school in Birau, a village in Tutong District, Brunei. The school provides secondary education leading up to GCE 'O' Level qualification.

== Name ==
The school is named after Raja Isteri Saleha, the Raja Isteri or Queen of Brunei and the queen consort of the current Sultan of Brunei, Sultan Hassanal Bolkiah.

== History ==
Raja Isteri Pengiran Anak Saleha Secondary School was inaugurated by Raja Isteri Saleha on 24 November 1988.

== Academics ==
The school provides secondary education which generally lasts five years. Students begin their studies in Year 7 and for two years they are assessed through Student Progress Assessment. This assessment will determine what streams they will proceed for the remaining years, in which they may differ in the range of subjects. Students in the 'Express' stream may also be able to complete secondary after Year 8 in only two years.

At the end of Year 11 (Year 10 of the 'Express' stream), students will sit for GCE 'O' Level examination. Some may also have subjects which are assessed under IGCSE qualification. Regardless, the grades obtained from the examination will factor for entry to sixth form or technical and vocational education.

== See also ==
- List of secondary schools in Brunei
