= Bukit Bendera, Brunei =

Bukit Bendera
- Village
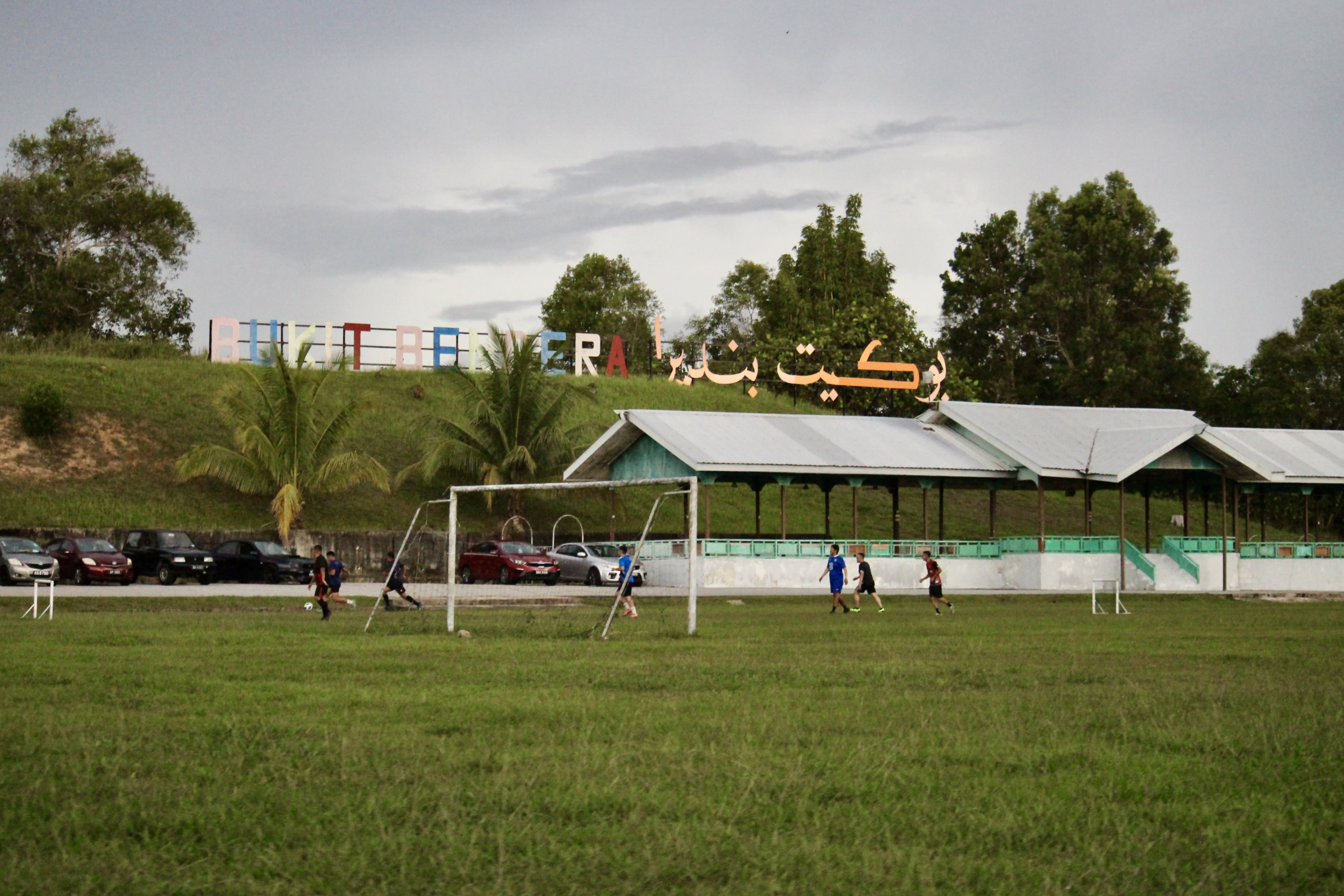
- Bukit Bendera sign

- Location in Brunei
- Coordinates: 4°48′47″N 114°39′38″E
- Country: Brunei
- District: Tutong
- Mukim: Pekan Tutong
- Town: Tutong
- Postcode: TA1341

Bukit Bendera is a populated area in Tutong, the town of Tutong District, Brunei. It is officially a village-level subdivision under the mukim or subdistrict of Pekan Tutong, as well as a designated postcode area with the postcode TA1341. The Tutong Municipal Department spans an area of about 0.024 square kilometres (0.0093 sq mi), encompassing parts of Petani and Bukit Bendera.

== History ==
A medical clinic was established in 1932 at a government residence. In 1954, a bonfire celebration honoring Lord Rowallan as the Chief Scout of Great Britain was held in Bukit Bendera.

== Infrastructure ==
Building a septic tank and other infrastructure for the government quarters in Bukit Bendera began in 1977.

Bukit Bendera Malay School, former staff included Hussain Mohammad Yussof. The school would be succeeded by Muda Hashim Secondary School.

Sugan Muslim Cemetery, is an old burial site dating as far back as 1499.

A community hall is located in the area.

=== Places of interest ===
Sungai Basong National Park, is a 20 hectares (49 acres) park.

The Tugu Peringatan Dewan Kemasyarakat Daerah, constructed around 1992, is located in front of the community hall. Made entirely of concrete, the monument was inaugurated by Sultan Hassanal Bolkiah during a thanksgiving and royal visit ceremony to the Tutong District, marking the 25th anniversary of his ascension to the throne on 26 October 1992. The construction was a collaboration between Jasra E.L.F. Company and the Brunei government.

The Tugu Mercu Tanda Kenangan, built around 2004, is located in front of the district office building. Made entirely of concrete, the monument is themed "Bangsaku Berjaya Seja Tugu Mega Tanda Kenangan" and was constructed to commemorate the 58th birthday celebration of Sultan Hassanal Bolkiah. It serves as a permanent gift from the people of the Tutong District, symbolising their unwavering loyalty and devotion to the sultan.
