= Sufri Bolkiah Secondary School =

Public school in Tutong District, Brunei

- Sekolah Menengah Sufri Bolkiah

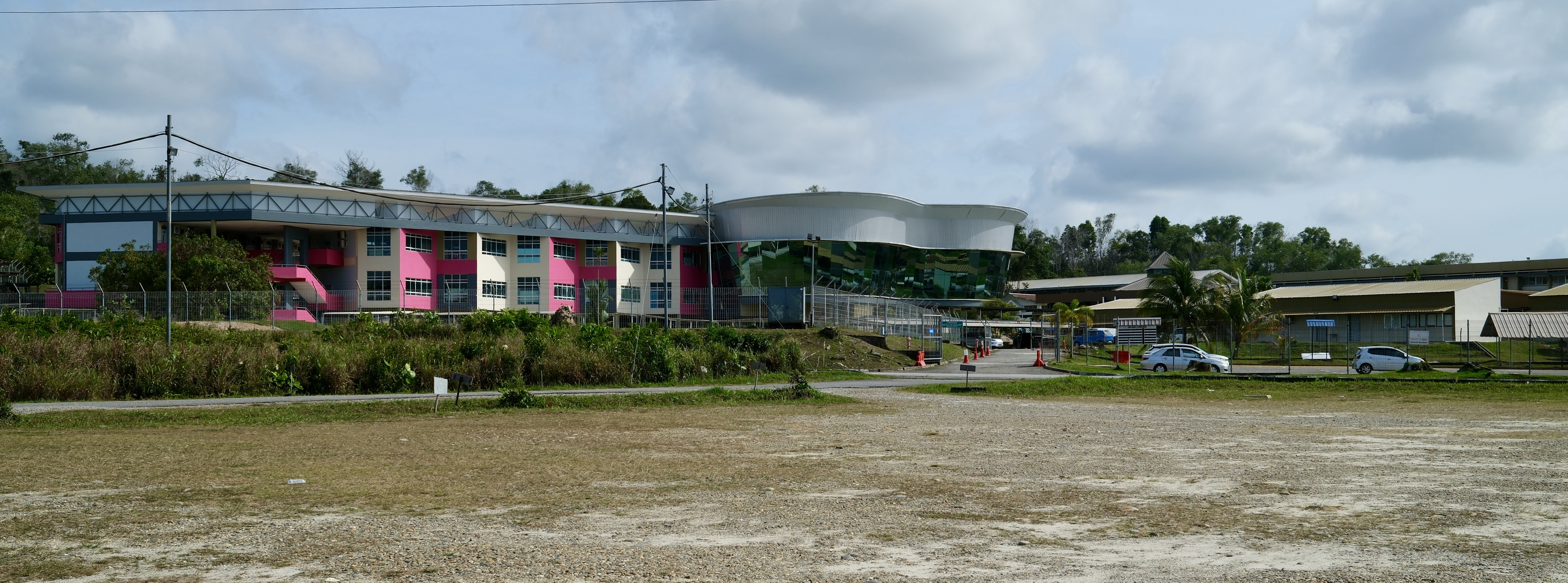
- The school in 2026

Location
- Jalan Pengiran Haji Ahmad; Bukit Bendera; Tutong, Tutong, TA1341; Brunei
- Coordinates: 4°48′45.1″N 114°39′49.2″E

Information
- Former name: Tutong English School (1969–1972); Sufri Bolkiah English School (1972–1985)
- School type: Government
- Motto: Berilmu, Berbakti dan Beriman (Knowledgeable, Devoted, and Faithful)
- Established: 1 August 1969; 56 years ago
- School district: Cluster 5
- Authority: Ministry of Education
- Principal: Krestina Daud
- Teaching staff: 83 (2002)
- Years offered: 7-11
- Gender: girls
- Enrollment: 1,056 (2002)
- Area: 20 acres (8.1 ha)
- Yearbook: Suara Tutong
- Affiliation: CIE
- Website: Official Instagram

Sufri Bolkiah Secondary School (Malay: Sekolah Menengah Sufri Bolkiah; SMSB ) is a government secondary school for girls located in Bukit Bendera, Tutong, approximately three miles from Tutong town, Brunei. The school was originally established in 1969 on a 20 acres (8.1 ha) site and officially opened on 28 April 1971 under the name Tutong English School.

== Namesake ==
Prince Sufri Bolkiah, born on 31 July 1952 at Istana Darul Hana in Brunei Town, is a member of Brunei's royal family and the third son of Sultan Omar Ali Saifuddien III and Raja Isteri Pengiran Anak Damit. He has three brothers, including Sultan Hassanal Bolkiah, and six sisters. Since 1984, he has served as president of the Brunei Darussalam National Olympic Council, and Football Association of Brunei Darussalam from 2013 to 2019.

== History ==
The establishment of an English school in Tutong District began on 29 February 1967 when the English preparatory school of Anthony Abell College (AAC) in Seria opened a branch in the district. Prior to this, students from Tutong who passed the English preparatory examination were sent to AAC and provided with full boarding facilities. The establishment of the branch school encouraged more students in Tutong to pursue English-medium education. In its first year, the school enrolled 158 students with seven teachers. As it lacked its own building, classes were temporarily held in three classrooms at Muda Hashim Malay School (SMMH), during the afternoon session. The school's academic programme was overseen by G. E. Codogan Edwards, principal of AAC, while administrative duties were handled by Ludin bin Hashim, headmaster of SMMH.

By 1 August 1969, due to increasing student numbers, which had reached 526, and the administrative challenges of managing the school from Seria, a permanent English school named Tutong English School was established. C. H. Gallop was appointed its first principal. That same year, a new school building was constructed on a 20-acre site in Bukit Bendera. While awaiting its completion, students continued to use two buildings at SMMH, causing the religious school located there to relocate to another part of the campus. By 1970, the growing student population, which had reached 813, necessitated another move to the Vocational School building. That year also marked the introduction of Form I classes.

On 28 April 1971, the school moved into its own partially completed building to accommodate the increasing number of students. The building was fully completed by the end of 1971 at a cost of approximately B$6 million. The secondary school facilities included 18 classrooms, three science laboratories, a sewing room, two cooking rooms, an art room, a teachers' lounge, metalwork and woodwork rooms, a film projection room, a commerce room, and a senior teachers' room. For the preparatory English school, there were 18 classrooms, a supervisor's room, and a dental clinic, designed in a cluster layout similar to English primary schools. Additional facilities included a multipurpose hall, a library, a school canteen, and an administrative office complex housing the principal’s office, a general office, two textbook storage rooms, and a staff lounge.

The school was officially inaugurated on 29 July 1972 by Prince Sufri Bolkiah and renamed Sufri Bolkiah English School. That year, the first Form III students sat for the Lower Certificate of Education examination. The school's enrolment reached 1,514 students, taught by 70 teachers, including graduates from Brunei Teachers College and expatriate teachers from Singapore, Malaysia, Ceylon, India, the Philippines, and England.

In 1985, the school was upgraded to secondary school status and renamed Sufri Bolkiah Secondary School. In 1998, it transitioned to an all-girls school. The principal that year was Hajah Dayang Aming binti Haji Wasli. By 2002, the school had 1,056 students and 83 teachers.

== Academics ==
Students has participated in co-curricular activities, including involvement in uniformed groups such as the Police Cadet Corps, girl guides, and the school band. They also engage in various sports and extracurricular pursuits, including netball, volleyball, chess, dikir (traditional singing), and martial arts. The school has achieved recognition in multiple sports competitions at both national and district levels. Notably, in 1995, the school secured championships in pasang (a traditional game) for the girls' category, national hockey (girls' category), military cadet competitions, national marching events, trailblasing contests, and cross-country races.

== Notable alumni ==
- Bahrin Abdullah (born 1961), a politician and businessperson

== See also ==
- List of secondary schools in Brunei
