= Kampong Bukit Beruang, Brunei =

Public housing estate in Tutong, Brunei

Bukit Beruang
- Village and public housing estate
- Kampong Bukit Beruang
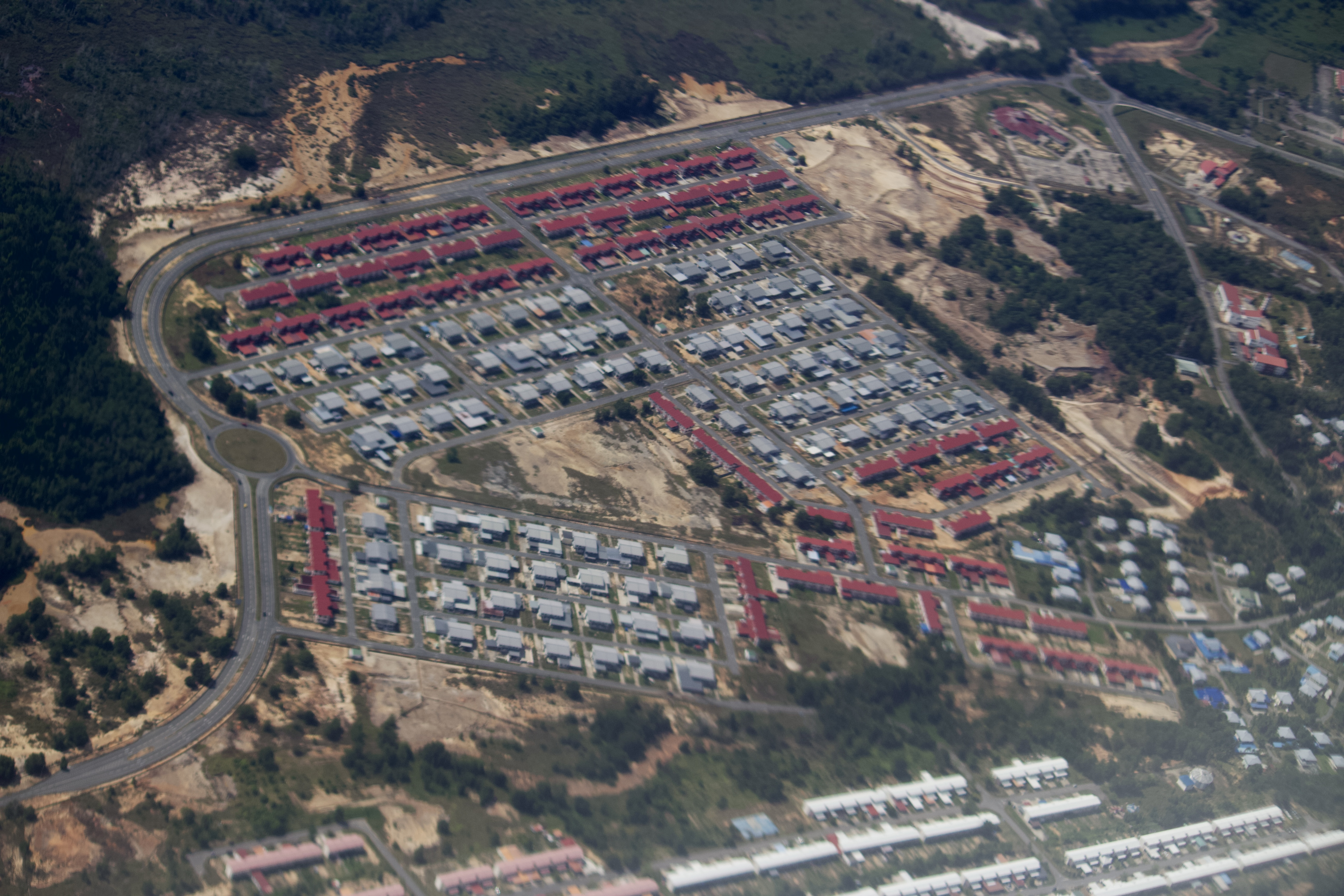
- Bukit Beruang National Housing Scheme

- Location in Brunei
- Coordinates: 4°43′42″N 114°36′40″E
- Country: Brunei
- District: Tutong
- Mukim: Telisai

Government
  - Village head: Moksin Moktar; Sahan Mumtazali (RPN 1); Azman Ismail (RPN 2, 3 & 4)

Population (2016)
  - Total: 6,157
- Time zone: UTC+8 (BNT)
- Postcode: TC3145, TC3345

Kampong Bukit Beruang (Malay: Kampung Bukit Beruang), also simply known as Bukit Beruang, is a village in Tutong District, Brunei, about 13 kilometres (8.1 mi) from the district town Pekan Tutong. The population was 6,157 in 2016. It is one of the villages within Mukim Telisai, a mukim subdivision in the district. It comprises the original village settlement as well as the public housing estate Bukit Beruang National Housing Scheme.

== Etymology ==
The name Bukit Beruang, meaning "Hill of Bears", is one of the more well-known place names. According to one myth, bears used to inhabit the area, which is how the place got its name. Sungai Beruang (Bears' Stream) is the name of a creek in Tutong, which may be related to the same bears.

The village was originally named Tepangan Beruang, which means 'A tree where a bear nests'. Bears were believed to nest on trees and that tree was called tepangan. At the time, the village had many bears to the point where it was a common sight in the forest, especially by some people from Kampong Penyatang and Kampong Danau who used boats through Penyatang River and Uropyang River. These rivers were used as a route for them to go back and forth for farming activities and visiting (buying and selling).

== History ==
Kampong Bukit Beruang was the meeting site between the people on the land side, namely Kampong Bukit Udal and its surroundings and from the villages on the north side such as Kampong Penyatang, Kampong Danau and Kampong Telisai. By using the river journey while trading and visiting a place called Tamuan Lawai, the people on the sea side would bring goods such as dried fish, belacan etc. while the people on the land side would bring their crops such as rice, cassava, and sugarcane.The history began to be recorded around the 1940s and 1950s.

== Public housing ==
The public housing estate has an area of 49 hectares (120 acres) and as of 2018 consist of 530 detached houses, 1,368 units of terraces, and 368 'cluster' houses of 4-units each. It is one of the only two public housing estates in the district; the other one being STKRJ Kampong Telisai.

The housing estate began construction in 2010 and was contracted to Tee international from Singapore. It was planned to compete building 1,500 houses by 2013.

== Infrastructure ==
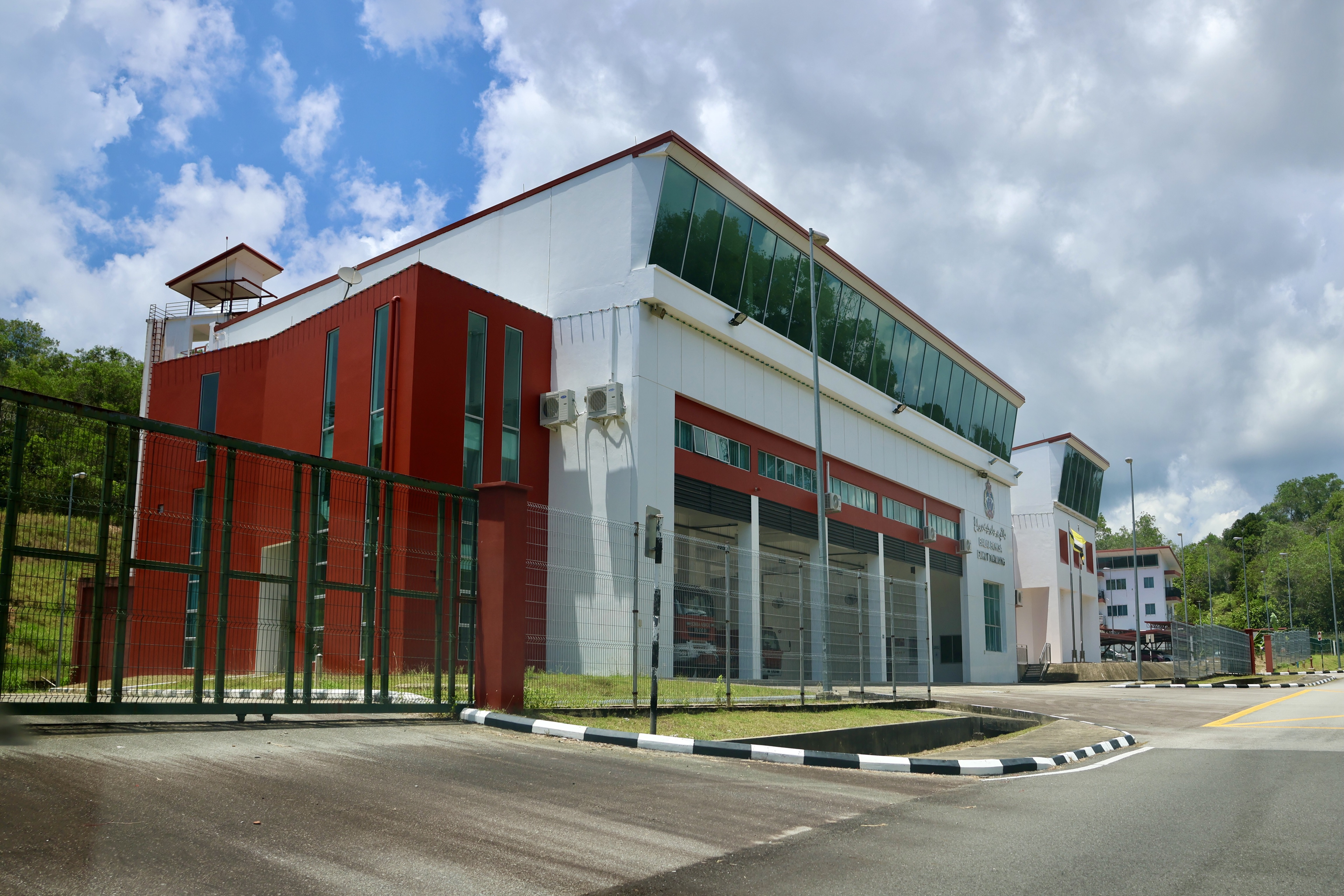
Bukit Beruang Fire Station

Facilities located in the village include:

- Dewan Kemasyarakatan Bukit Beruang, the village community hall
- Bukit Beruang Fire Station, opened in 2014 and one of the three fire stations in the district.

=== Education ===
The local primary schools include:

- Pengiran Kesuma Negara Bukit Beruang Primary School — It was formerly known as Sekolah Melayu Bukit Beruang ("Bukit Beruang Malay School"). The current building began to be used in 1999. As of 2004, it had 33 teachers for the morning session and 11 in the afternoon, as well as 364 pupils from preschool to Primary 6. The school facilities include classrooms, a library, dental clinic, playground and canteen.
- Perpindahan Kampong Bukit Beruang II Primary School
- Tutong Sixth Form Centre, the only sixth form college in the district
- Sayyidina 'Othman Secondary School, the government secondary school for the residents of Mukim Telisai

Each school also shares grounds with a sekolah ugama i.e. school for the country's Islamic religious primary education.

=== Religion ===
Rancangan Perumahan Negara Bukit Beruang Mosque is the village mosque.
