= Sayyidina 'Othman Secondary School =

- Sekolah Menengah Sayyidina 'Othman

Location
- Jalan Bincaloi; Bukit Beruang, Tutong, TC3345; Brunei
- Coordinates: 4°44′13″N 114°36′31″E

Information
- School type: government, secondary
- School district: Cluster 5
- Authority: Ministry of Education
- Principal: Vincent Andrew
- Years offered: 7-11
- Gender: mixed
- Yearbook: Abadi

Sayyidina 'Othman Secondary School (Malay: Sekolah Menengah Sayyidina 'Othman or SMSO) is a government secondary school in Bukit Beruang, a settlement in Tutong District, Brunei. The school provides five years of general secondary education leading up to O Level qualification. As of 2018, the principal of Sayyidina 'Othman Secondary School is Vincent Andrew.

== History ==
On 9 May 1994, Bukit Beruang Secondary School officially opened. It was renamed Sayyidina 'Othman Secondary School on 30 July 1996, with the help of Pengiran Ismail. Beginning on 18 March 2002, the school also served as the district's sixth-form center until December 2011. Currently, lower and upper secondary level education is provided by the school.

== See also ==
- List of secondary schools in Brunei
