= Bukit =

Bukit, the Indonesian or Malay word for hill, may refer to:

== Brunei ==
- Bukit Bendera, area in Tutong, town of Tutong District, Brunei.
- Mukim Bukit Sawat, mukim in Belait District, Brunei.
- Pagon Hill (Malay: Bukit Pagon), the highest mountain in Brunei.
- Kampong Bukit, village in Tutong District, Brunei.

== Indonesia ==
- Agro Bukit, palm oil company from Indonesia.
- Bukit Baka Bukit Raya National Park, national park on Borneo Island, Indonesia.
- Barisan Mountains (Bukit Barisan), mountain range on the western side of Sumatra, Indonesia.
- Bukit Dago, hill in Indonesia.
- Bukit Daun, stratovolcano in Sumatra, Indonesia.
- Mount Kunyit (also known as Bukit Belerang), fumarolic stratovolcano on Talang Kemuning Village, Gunung Raya District, Kerinci Regency, Jambi, Sumatra, Indonesia.
- Bukit Duabelas National Park, national park in Sumatra, Indonesia.
- Bukit Kerang, archaeological site of the Mesolithic era found in the Aceh Tamiang Regency, Aceh, Eastern Sumatra, Indonesia.
- Bukit Lawang, tourist village on the bank of Bahorok River in North Sumatra province of Indonesia.
- Bukit Lumut Balai, stratovolcano on Sumatraisland, Indonesia.
- Bukit Peninsula, area in Bali, Indonesia.
- Bukit Perai Protection Forest, forest on the island of Borneo in Indonesia.
- Bukit Seguntang, small hill at the capital city of South Sumatra, Indonesia.
- Bukittinggi, West Sumatra, Indonesia.

== Malaysia ==
- Anak Bukit, mukim and the royal town of Kedah, Malaysia.
- Bukit Aman, metonym for a large area that serves as the Royal Malaysia Police headquarters.
- Bukit Antarabangsa, hillside township located in Ulu Klang, Ampang District, Selangor, Malaysia.
- Bukit Badak Komuter station, commuter train station, Malaysia.
- Bukit Bakri, town in Muar District, Johor, Malaysia.
- Bukit Baru, mukim and town in Melaka Tengah District, Malacca, Malaysia.
- Bukit Batu, mukim in Kulai District, Johor, Malaysia.
- Bukit Begunan, state constituency in Sarawak, Malaysia.
- Bukit Berapit Rail Tunnel, the longest rail tunnel in Malaysia.
- Bukit Beruntung, town in Hulu Selangor District, Selangor, Malaysia.
- Bukit Besi
- Bukit Bintang
- Bukit Bunga, village in Tanah Merah District, Kelantan, Malaysia.
- Bukit Bunuh, hill in Perak, Malaysia.
- Bukit Chagar RTS station, terminal station in Johor Bahru, Johor, Malaysia.
- Bukit Chandan, state constituency in Perak, Malaysia.
- Bukit Cina, mountain in Malacca City, Malaysia.
- Damansara Heights (Bukit Damansara), upscale suburb in western side of Kuala Lumpur, Malaysia.
- Bukit Dukung MRT station, mass rapid transit (MRT) station in Malaysia.
- Fraser's Hill (Bukit Fraser), hill resort located on the Titiwangsa Ridge in Raub District, Pahang, Malaysia.
- Bukit Gambir, small town in Tangkak District, Johor, Malaysia.
- Bukit Gantang
- Bukit Gasing, tropical forest reserve in Malaysia.
- Bukit Gelugor
- Bukit Goram, state constituency in Sarawak, Malaysia.
- Bukit Ibam, small town in Rompin District, Pahang, Malaysia.
- Bukit Indah, suburb in Iskandar Puteri, Johor Bahru District, Johor, Malaysia.
- Bukit Jalil, affluent suburb in Kuala Lumpur, Malaysia.
- Bukit Jambul, residential neighbourhood within the Northeast Penang Island District, Penang, Malaysia.
- Bukit Jelutong, upscale suburb of Shah Alam, Selangor, Malaysia.
- Bukit Kangkar, small town in Mukim Serom, Tangkak District, Johor.
- Bukit Katil, mukim and town in Melaka Tengah District, Malacca, Malaysia.
- Bukit Kayu Hitam, small town in Kubang Pasu District, Kedah, Malaysia.
- Bukit Kepayang (state constituency), state constituency in Negeri Sembilan, Malaysia.
- Bukit Kepong, mukim in Muar District, Johor, Malaysia.
- Bukit Ketri railway station, railway station of the West Coast Line located at Bukti Ketri, Perlis.
- Bukit Kiara, densely forested area of Kuala Lumpur, Malaysia.
- Bukit Kota, state constituency in Sarawak, Malaysia.
- Bukit Kuang Bridge (Jambatan Bukit Kuang), the main bridge on Chukai River in Kemaman District, Terengganu, Malaysia.
- Bukit Kutu, former hill station and now a ghost town in Hulu Selangor District, Selangor, Malaysia.
- Bukit Lada, state constituency in Kedah, Malaysia.
- Bukit Lanjan, hill in Petaling District, Selangor, Malaysia.
- Bukit Larut, hill resort in Malaysia located in the state of Perak, Malaysia.
- Bukit Mabong District, district, in Kapit Division, Sarawak, Malaysia.
- Bukit Mahkota, new township in Bangi, Hulu Langat District, Selangor, Malaysia.
- Bukit Malawati, hillfort located in Kuala Selangor, Selangor, Malaysia.
- Bukit Marak, village in Bachok District, Kelantan, Malaysia.
- Bukit Mas, federal constituency in Sarawak, Malaysia.
- Bukit Melawati, state constituency in Selangor, Malaysia.
- Bukit Mertajam
- Bukit Minyak, industrial zone in Central Seberang Perai District, Penang, Malaysia.
- Bukit Nanas, small hill in Kuala Lumpur, Malaysia.
- Bukit Naning, main town in Muar District, Johor, Malaysia.
- Bukit Panau, state constituency in Kelantan, Malaysia
- Bukit Pasir, small town in Muar District, Johor, Malaysia.
- Bukit Payong, town Marang District, Terengganu, Malaysia.
- Bukit Payung, state constituency in Terengganu, Malaysia.
- Bukit Permai, state constituency in Johor, Malaysia.
- Bukit Petaling, location in Kuala Lumpur, Malaysia.
- Bukit Pinang, mukim in Kota Setar District, Kedah, Malaysia.
- Bukit Puteri, small hill of historical significance in Kuala Terengganu, Terengganu, Malaysia.
- Bukit Putus Viaduct, fourth highest bridge in Malaysia
- Bukit Raja, mukim in Petaling District, Selangor, Malaysia.
- Bukit Rahman Putra, township in Sungai Buloh, Selangor, Malaysia.
- Bukit Rimau, township in Shah Alam, Klang District, Selangor, Malaysia.
- Bukit Rotan, small town in Kuala Selangor District, Selangor, Malaysia.
- Bukit Saban
- Bukit Sari, state constituency in Sarawak, Malaysia.
- Bukit Selambau
- Bukit Semuja, state constituency in Sarawak, Malaysia.
- Bukit Sentosa, district in Hulu Selangor.
- Bukit Subang, township in Shah Alam, Selangor, Malaysia.
- Bukit Tambun, town, a suburb of Simpang Ampat in Penang, Malaysia
- Bukit Tengah, industrial area in Central Seberang Perai District, Penang, Malaysia.
- Bukit Tigapuluh National Park, National Park in eastern Sumatra.
- Bukit Tinggi, Pahang, Malaysia
- Bukit Tuku, former state constituency in Kelantan, Malaysia.
- Bukit Tunggal state constituency in Terengganu, Malaysia.
- Bukit Tunku, upper-class residential area in Kuala Lumpur, Malaysia
- Felda Tun Ghaffar Bukit Senggeh, mukim in Jasin District, Malacca, Malaysia.
- Jalan Bukit, one of Kajang's main population centres.
- Kaki Bukit, small town in Perlis, Malaysia.
- Taman Bukit Maluri, township in Segambut constituency, Kuala Lumpur, Malaysia.
- Taman Bukit Pasir, township in Bandar Penggaram, Batu Pahat, Johor, Malaysia.

== Singapore ==
- Bukit Batok, Planning area and matured residential town in West Region of Singapore.
  - Bukit Batok MRT station, MRT station in Singapore
- Bukit Brown
- Bukit Canberra, integrated sports and community hub.
- Bukit Chandu, hill in Kent Ridge in Singapore.
- Bukit Gombak, subzone of Bukit Batok, Singapore.
- Bukit Ho Swee, subzone within the planning area of Bukit Merah, Singapore.
- Bukit Merah, planning area and new town situated in the southernmost part of the Central Region of Singapore.
- Bukit Panjang, Planning Area and HDB Town in West Region, Singapore
  - Bukit Panjang MRT/LRT station, MRT and LRT station in Singapore
  - Bukit Panjang LRT line, Light rail transit line in Singapore
- Jurong Hill (Bukit Peropok), scenic hill situated in western Singapore off Jalan Ahmad Ibrahim.
- Bukit Purmei, small housing estate within Bukit Merah planning area in Singapore.
- Bukit Timah, area located within the Central Region of Singapore.
- Bukit View Secondary School, co-educational government secondary school in Bukit Batok, Singapore.
- Hill Street (Jalan Bukit), major road in the Downtown Core of Singapore.
- Kaki Bukit, Singapore
- Singapore Turf Club, the Bukit Turf Club to manage horse racing for the Singapore Totaliser Board (Tote Board).

== Sri Lanka ==
- Bukit Darah, a member of Carsons Group, is the largest shareholder of the company while the Selvanathan family.

== Thailand ==
- Bukit railway station, railway station in Bukit Subdistrict, Cho-airong District, Narathiwat.

== See also ==
- Anak Bukit (disambiguation)
- Bukit Antarabangsa (disambiguation)
- Bukit Batu (disambiguation)
- Bukit Batok (disambiguation)
- Bukit Bendera (disambiguation)
- Bukit Beruntung (disambiguation)
- Bukit Besi (disambiguation)
- Bukit Bintang (disambiguation)
- Bukit Brown (disambiguation)
- Bukit Bunga (disambiguation)
- Bukit Chandu (disambiguation)
- Bukit Fraser (disambiguation)
- Bukit Gambir (disambiguation)
- Bukit Gantang (disambiguation)
- Bukit Gasing (disambiguation)
- Bukit Gelugor (disambiguation)
- Bukit Gombak (disambiguation)
- Bukit Ho Swee (disambiguation)
- Bukit Ibam (disambiguation)
- Bukit Indah (disambiguation)
- Bukit Jalil (disambiguation)
- Bukit Jelutong (disambiguation)
- Bukit Katil (disambiguation)
- Bukit Kayu Hitam (disambiguation)
- Bukit Kepayang (disambiguation)
- Bukit Kepong (disambiguation)
- Bukit Kiara (disambiguation)
- Bukit Lanjan (disambiguation)
- Bukit Larut (disambiguation)
- Bukit Merah (disambiguation)
- Bukit Mertajam (disambiguation)
- Bukit Nanas (disambiguation)
- Bukit Naning (disambiguation)
- Bukit Panjang (disambiguation)
- Bukit Pasir (disambiguation)
- Bukit Pinang (disambiguation)
- Bukit Putus (disambiguation)
- Bukit Raja (disambiguation)
- Bukit Rimau (disambiguation)
- Bukit Saban (disambiguation)
- Bukit Selambau (disambiguation)
- Bukit Tambun (disambiguation)
- Bukit Tengah (disambiguation)
- Bukit Timah (disambiguation)
- Bukit Tinggi (disambiguation)
- Bukit Tunku (disambiguation)
- Jalan Bukit (disambiguation)
- Kaki Bukit (disambiguation)
- Kampong Bukit (disambiguation)
- Taman Bukit (disambiguation)
