= Kampong Bukit (disambiguation) =

Kampong Bukit ('Hill village' in Indonesian and Malay) may refer to:

- Kampong Bukit, village in Tutong District, Brunei.

== Other villages or towns containing "Kampong Bukit" ==
- Kampong Bukit Barun
- Kampong Bukit Belalong, a village in Brunei.
- Kampong Bukit Beruang, a settlement in Brunei.
- Kampong Bukit Jambu
- Kampong Bukit Merah
- Kampong Bukit Panggal, a village in Tutong District, Brunei.
- Kampong Bukit Perah
- Kampong Bukit Puan
- Kampong Bukit Sawat
- Kampong Bukit Tunggal
- Kampong Bukit Udal, a village in Tutong District, Brunei.

== See also ==
- Bukit (disambiguation)
- Kampong (disambiguation)
- Kampong Bukit Beruang (disambiguation)
