= Indah =

Indah (Malay for "beautiful") may refer to:

- Indah Water Konsortium, a national sewerage company in Malaysia
- Indah (orangutan), a resident of the Great Ape Trust

Places:

- Pulau Indah, an island in Klang, Selangor, Malaysia
- Kota Harapan Indah, a city in Bekasi, West Java, Indonesia
- Setia Indah, a township in Johor Bahru, Johor, Malaysia
- Bukit Indah, a township in Iskandar Puteri, Johor, Malaysia
- Pandan Indah, a township in Ampang, Selangor, Malaysia
- Pondok Indah, a residential area in South Jakarta, Indonesia

People:

- Dita Indah Sari (born 1972), an Indonesian trade union and socialist activist
- Indah Nevertari (born 1992), Indonesian singer

== See also ==
- Bukit Indah (disambiguation)
