= Bukit Merah (disambiguation) =

Bukit Merah is a planning area and new town situated in the southernmost part of the Central Region of Singapore.

Bukit Merah ('Red Hill' in Indonesian and Malay) may also refer to:

- Bukit Merah (subzone), a subzone within the planning area of Bukit Merah, Singapore
- Bukit Merah Lake Railway Bridge, arailway in the state of Perak, Malaysia
- Bukit Merah Public Library, a public library located at VivoCity, Singapore
- Bukit Merah railway station, a Malaysian train station
- Bukit Merah Secondary School, a school in Bukit Merah, Singapore

== See also ==
- 1982 Bukit Merah radioactive pollution
- Bukit Merah, Perak
- Bukit Merah double murders
- Bukit Merah Interchange (disambiguation)
- Jalan Bukit Merah (disambiguation)
