= Jalan Bukit =

Jalan Bukit ('Hill Road' in Indonesian and Malay) may refer to:

- Jalan Bukit, one of Kajang's main population centres.
- Hill Street (Jalan Bukit), major road in the Downtown Core of Singapore.

== Other streets or roads containing "Jalan Bukit" ==
- Jalan Bukit Aman
- Jalan Bukit Badong, major road in Selangor, Malaysia.
- Jalan Bukit Bangsar
- Jalan Bukit Belimbing, major road in Selangor, Malaysia.
- Jalan Bukit Bendera
- Jalan Bukit Beruntung, industrial federal road in Selangor, Malaysia.
- Jalan Bukit Bintang, major road in Kuala Lumpur, Malaysia.
- Jalan Bukit Ceylon
- Jalan Bukit Chabang, major road to Wang Kelian, Perlis.
- Jalan Bukit Changgang, federal road in Selangor, Malaysia.
- Jalan Bukit Gambir, major road in Johor, Malaysia.
- Jalan Bukit Goh, federal road in Pahang, Malaysia.
- Jalan Bukit Ho Swee
- Jalan Bukit Jawa
- Jalan Bukit Katil, dual-carriageway state road in Malacca state, Malaysia.
- Jalan Bukit Kemuning
- Jalan Bukit Kepong
- Jalan Bukit Kuantan, federal road in Pahang, Malaysia.
- Jalan Bukit Larut, federal road in Perak, Malaysia.
- Jalan Bukit Mahkamah
- Jalan Bukit Malut, major federal road in Langkawi Island, Kedah, Malaysia.
- Jalan Bukit Mata
- Jalan Bukit Nanas
- Jalan Bukit Panchor
- Jalan Bukit Panggal
- Jalan Bukit Pasoh, road in Tanjong Pagar within the Outram Planning Area of Singapore.
- Jalan Bukit Pelindung, federal road in Kuantan, Pahang, Malaysia.
- Jalan Bukit Petaling
- Jalan Bukit Serampang, main state road in Johor, Malaysia.
- Jalan Bukit Tambun, federal road in Penang, Malaysia.
- Jalan Bukit Timah, major road in Singapore,
- Jalan Bukit Tujuh (Seven Hill Road), infamous short strip of road
- Jalan Bukit Tunku
- Jalan Bukit Unggul

== See also ==
- Bukit (disambiguation)
- Jalan Bukit Fraser (disambiguation)
- Jalan Bukit Merah (disambiguation)
