= Butet Manurung =

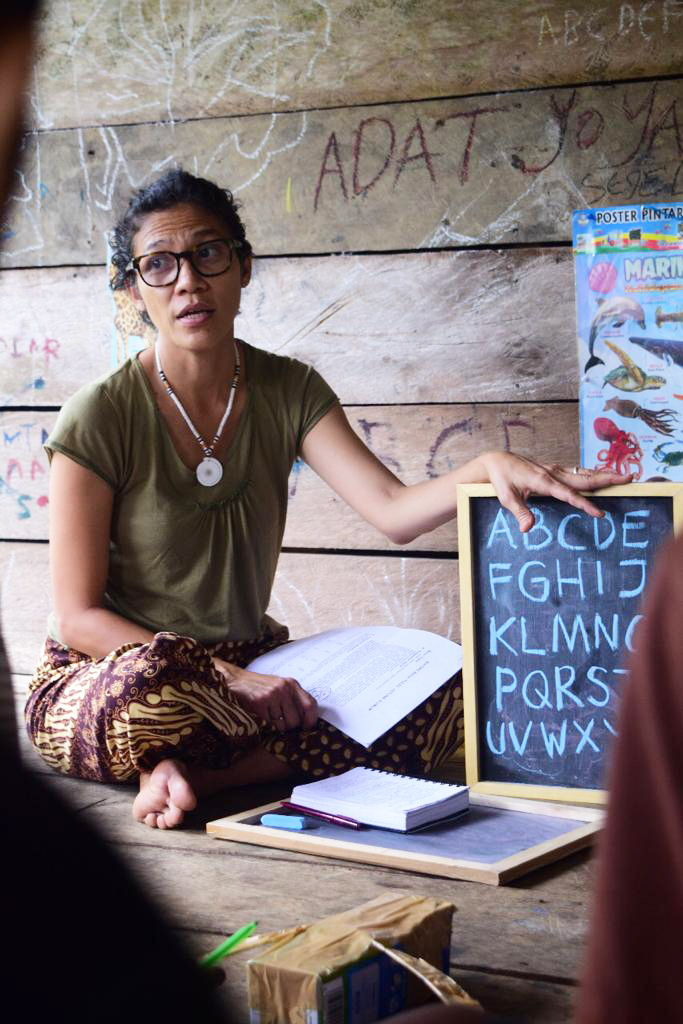
- The picture of Butet Manurung teaches the indigenous community of Orang Rimba Jambi
- Born: Saur Marlina Manurung; February 21, 1972 (age 54); Jakarta, Indonesia
- Known for: Founder of "Sokola Institute"

Butet Manurung or Saur Marlina Manurung (born in Jakarta, February 21, 1972) is a pioneer of alternative education for indigenous people in isolated and remote areas of Indonesia. Like other young Batak girls, she was called "Butet" - therefore, she is well known as Butet Manurung.

She founded the first pilot school in Orang Rimba society (or Suku Kubu), a tribe native to Bukit Dua Belas National Park, Jambi, Sumatra. The method that she used was partly anthropological - meaning that her teaching of reading, writing and counting was conducted while living with her students for a span of several months. This system was combined with a respect and consideration for the daily behavioral patterns of the society.

Once it had been systematized, she would go on to develop the Sokola Rimba system. The term "Sokola Rimba" was derived from the local language of the Orang Rimba, one of various dialects within the Malayic language subgroup. The Sokola Rimba system is now used in several remote areas across Indonesia, such as in Halmahera and Flores. The Government of Indonesia is planning to adopt this system for the purposes of further development of remote communities in the country.

She married Kelvin James Milne on June 5, 2010, in Canberra, Australia.

In March 2022, Mattel appointed Butet Manurung as the 3rd Barbie role model from Indonesia, after Nyimas Bunga Cinta in 2020, and Anne Avantie in 2021.
