= Malaysia Federal Route 150 =

Road in Malaysia

Federal Route 150
- Jalan Paaboi

Route information
- Maintained by Malaysian Public Works Department
- Length: 2.46 km (1.53 mi)

Major junctions
- West end: Bukit Tambun
- FT 149 Federal Route 149; FT 1 Federal Route 1
- East end: Paaboi

Location
- Country: Malaysia
- Primary destinations: Batu Kawan, Val D'or, Sungai Bakap

Highway system
- Highways in Malaysia; Expressways; Federal; State

Federal Route 150, or Jalan Paaboi, is a federal road in Penang, Malaysia.

== Features ==
At most sections, the Federal Route 150 was built under the JKR R5 road standard, allowing maximum speed limit of up to 90 km/h.

== Junction lists ==
The entire route is located in South Seberang Perai District, Penang.

Legend:

- I/C - Interchange, I/S - Intersection, RSA - Rest and service area, OBR - Overhead bridge restaurant, R/R - Restaurant and rest plaza, L/B - Layby, V/P - Vista point, TN - tunnel, T/P - Toll plaza, BR - Bridge
- C - Cloverleaf, S - Stack, T-A - Trumpet-A, T-B - Trumpet-B, DT - Directional-T/Y, SDT - Semi-Directional-T/Y, P-Y - Partial-Y, D - Diamond, P-C - Partial cloverleaf, D-D - Diverging diamond, D-R - Direct ramp

Location	km	mi	Destinations	Notes
Bukit Tambun	2.46	1.53	FT 149 Malaysia Federal Route 149 – Batu Kawan, Simpang Ampat; North–South Expressway Northern Route / AH2 – Bukit Kayu Hitam, Penang, Ipoh, Kuala Lumpur	T-junctions
Taman Urai Jaya				
Taman Merak				
Paaboi	0.0	0.0	FT 1 Malaysia Federal Route 1 – Butterworth, Bukit Mertajam, Sungai Bakap, Nibong Tebal, Taiping	T-junctions
1.000 mi = 1.609 km; 1.000 km = 0.621 mi
