= Bukit Bintang (disambiguation) =

Bukit Bintang may refer to:

- Bukit Bintang
- Bukit Bintang (federal constituency), represented in the Dewan Rakyat
- Bukit Bintang (Selangor federal constituency), former constituency in the Dewan Rakyat
- Bukit Bintang Road

== See also ==
- Star Hill AME Church
- Starr Hill (disambiguation)
