= Panjang =

Panjang may refer to:

- Lang Island a.k.a. Panjang Island, in the Sunda Strait between Java and Sumatra
- Panjang Island in the South Natuna Islands off western Borneo (02°45′N 108°55′E)
- Panjang Island in the middle group of the Natuna Islands off western Borneo (04°15′N 108°12′E)
- Panjang Island at the mouth of the Kapuas River in West Kalimantan, Borneo (00°02′N 109°13′E)
- Panjang Island off the coast of Sumbawa
- Panjang Island, Maluku, an island in the Gorom group southeast of Seram
- Panjang River in Nepal
- Common name for Acacia lasiocarpa, a plant found in Western Australia

== See also ==
- Bukit Panjang (disambiguation)
