= Malaysia Federal Route 149 =

Road in Malaysia

Federal Route 149
- Jalan Bukit Tambun

Route information
- Maintained by Malaysian Public Works Department
- Length: 2.7 km (1.7 mi)

Major junctions
- West end: Batu Kawan
- Lebuhraya Bandar Cassia; North–South Expressway Northern Route / AH2; FT 150 Federal Route 150; FT 1 Federal Route 1
- East end: Simpang Ampat

Location
- Country: Malaysia
- Primary destinations: Bukit Tambun

Highway system
- Highways in Malaysia; Expressways; Federal; State

Federal Route 149, or Jalan Bukit Tambun, is a federal road in Penang, Malaysia.

== Features ==
At most sections, the Federal Route 149 was built under the JKR R5 road standard, allowing maximum speed limit of up to 90 km/h.

== Junction lists ==
The entire route is located in South Seberang Perai District, Penang.

Legend:

- I/C - Interchange, I/S - Intersection, RSA - Rest and service area, OBR - Overhead bridge restaurant, R/R - Restaurant and rest plaza, L/B - Layby, V/P - Vista point, TN - tunnel, T/P - Toll plaza, BR - Bridge
- C - Cloverleaf, S - Stack, T-A - Trumpet-A, T-B - Trumpet-B, DT - Directional-T/Y, SDT - Semi-Directional-T/Y, P-Y - Partial-Y, D - Diamond, P-C - Partial cloverleaf, D-D - Diverging diamond, D-R - Direct ramp

| Location | km | mi | Name | Destinations | Notes |
|---|---|---|---|---|---|
| Batu Kawan | 2.70 | 1.68 | Batu Kawan | Batu Musang Jetty (Ferry to Pulau Aman) | |
| Batu Kawan | | | Bukit Batu Kawan | Bukit Batu Kawan, Tangga Seribu | |
| Batu Kawan | | | Kampung Batu Kawan | | |
| Batu Kawan | | | Pengkalan Batu Kawan | | |
| Batu Kawan | | | Jalan Kampung Musai | P181 Jalan Kampung Musai – Kampung Musai | T-junctions |
| Batu Kawan | | | Bandar Cassia | Lebuhraya Bandar Cassia (Bandar Cassia Avenue) – Bandar Cassia; Sultan Abdul Halim Muadzam Shah Bridge – Batu Maung, Bayan Lepas, Penang International Airport | Roundabout |
| Batu Kawan | | | Batu Kawan Sports Complex | Penang State Stadium | |
| Batu Kawan | | | Sungai Jawi Bridge | | |
| Bukit Tambun | | | Bukit Tambun | P179 Jalan Perindustrian Bukit Minyak 8 – Science Park; Jalan Batu Kawan – Kampung Sekolah Simpang Ampat, Kampung Ah Chooi | Junctions |
| Bukit Tambun | | | Bukit Tambun North-NSE | North–South Expressway Northern Route / AH2 – Bukit Kayu Hitam, Penang, Juru | T-junctions |
| Bukit Tambun | | | Bukit Tambun South-NSE | North–South Expressway Northern Route / AH2 – Ipoh, Kuala Lumpur; Sultan Abdul Halim Muadzam Shah Bridge – Batu Maung, Bayan Lepas, Penang International Airport | Eastbound LILO, need U-Turn |
| Bukit Tambun | | | Jalan Paaboi | FT 150 Malaysia Federal Route 150 – Paaboi, Nibong Tebal, Sungai Bakap | Westbound LILO, need U-Turn |
| Bukit Tambun | | | Bukit Minyak I/S | Jalan Perindustrian Bukit Minyak – Butterworth, Bukit Minyak | T-junctions |
| Simpang Ampat | 0.00 | 0.00 | Simpang Ampat | FT 1 Malaysia Federal Route 1 – Butterworth, Bukit Mertajam, Nibong Tebal, Sungai Bakap, Taiping; Jalan Tasek Mutiara 2 – Bandar Tasek Mutiara | Junctions |
1.000 mi = 1.609 km; 1.000 km = 0.621 mi: Incomplete access
