= Gombak (disambiguation) =

Gombak District is an administrative district in the state of Selangor, Malaysia.

Gombak may also refer to:

- Gombak (town), in Gombak District
- Gombak (federal constituency), represented in the Dewan Rakyat
- Gombak (state constituency), in the Selangor State Legislative Assembly 1974–1978, 1978–1982, and 1982–1986
- Gombak Setia (state constituency), represented in the Selangor State Legislative Assembly since 1986

== See also ==
- Bukit Gombak (disambiguation)
