= Anak (disambiguation) =

Anak is a figure in the Hebrew Bible said to be the forefather of the Anakites.

Anak may also refer to:

- Anak County, county in South Hwanghae province, North Korea
  - Anak Tomb No. 3, archeological site in North Korea
- Boeing 377 Stratocruiser (Israeli Air Force nickname Anak)
- Anak the Parthian, noble who lived in the mid 3rd century who murdered King Khosrov II of Armenia
- Arnoraja or Anaka, a ruler of medieval India
- A temple in the role-playing game Drakkhen

In Malayo-Polynesian languages such as Indonesian, Malaysian, and Tagalog, anak means "child". In this sense it may refer to:

- "Anak" (song), 1977 Filipino song by Freddie Aguilar
- Anak (film), 2000 Filipino film
- Anak Mindanao, Philippine party list
- Anak Krakatoa, island and caldera in Indonesia
- Anak Wungsu, Balinese monarch of the 10th century AD

== See also ==
- Anak Bukit (disambiguation)
