= Kepayang =

Kepayang may refer to:

== Plants ==
- Hodgsonia, a vine
- Pangium edule, a tall tree

== Other ==
- Kepayang (state constituency), electoral district in Perak, Malaysia

== See also ==
- Bukit Kepayang (disambiguation)
- Kepayan, neighbourhood in Kota Kinabalu, Malaysia
