= Tanyong Mat railway station =

Railway station in Thailand

Coordinates: 6.2927°N 101.7138°E

Tanyong Mat ตันหยงมัส
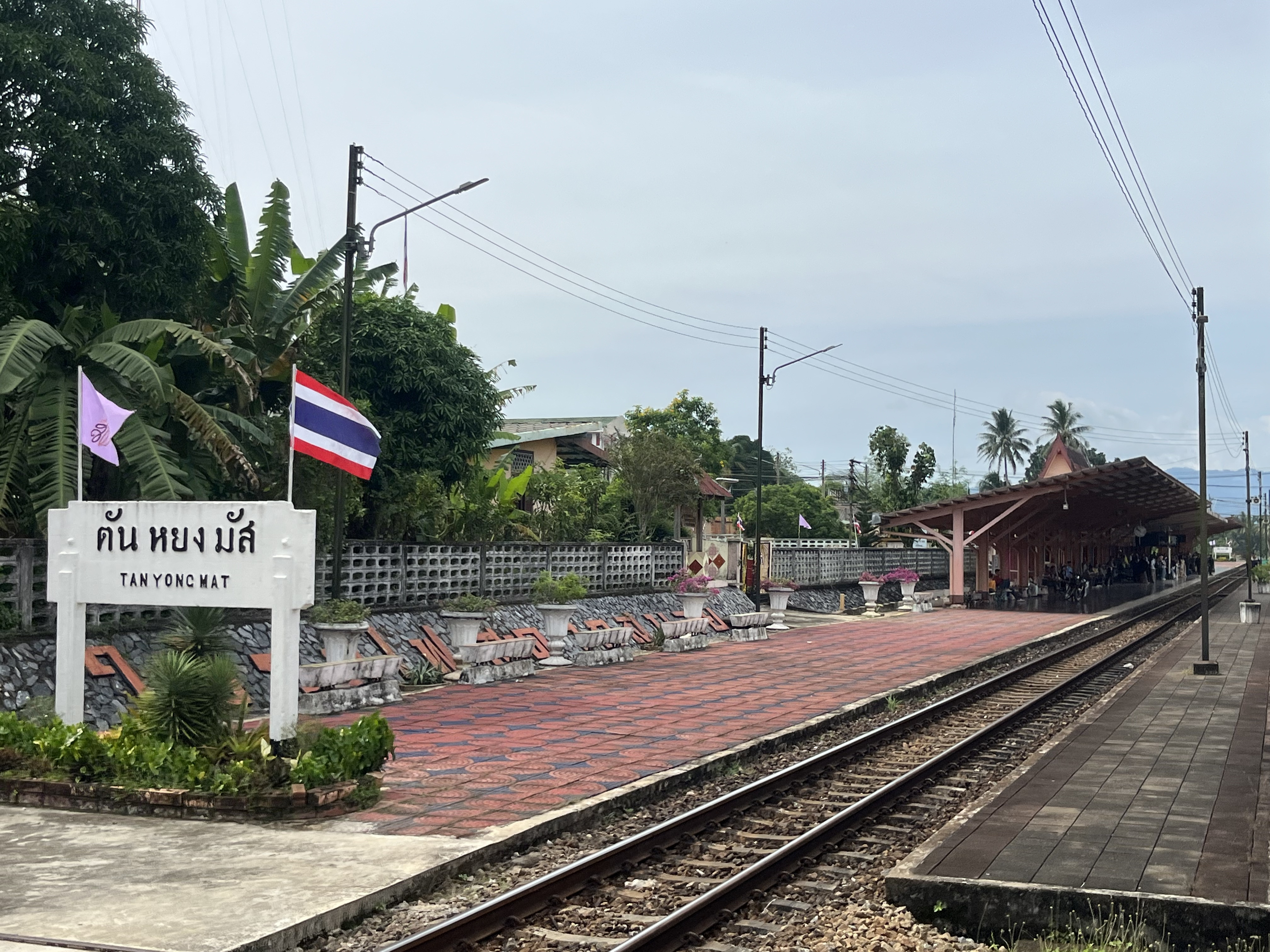

General information
- Location: National Highway No.4055, Tanyong Mat Subdistrict, Ra-ngae District, Narathiwat
- Owner: State Railway of Thailand
- Line: Southern Line
- Platforms: 2
- Tracks: 3

Other information
- Station code: ยม.

History
- Opened: March 1920

Services
Preceding station	State Railway of Thailand	Following station
Kadae Halt towards Hua Lamphong or Krung Thep Aphiwat	Southern Line	Pa Phai towards Su-ngai Kolok
Location

Tanyong Mat railway station is a railway station located in Tanyong Mat Subdistrict, Ra-ngae District, Narathiwat, Thailand. The station is a class 1 railway station located 1099.503 km from Thon Buri railway station. Tanyong Mat opened in March 1920, as part of the Southern Line Balo-Tanyong Mat section.

In July 2014, 2 bombs went off in the vicinity of the railway station, one in a trash can in front of the station, and one near a clock tower nearby. This event was part of the separatist attacks of the South Thailand Insurgency.

== Train services ==
- Thaksin Special Express; train No. 37 / 38 Krung Thep Aphiwat - Sungai Kolok - Krung Thep Aphiwat
- Rapid train No. 171 / 172 Krung Thep Aphiwat - Sungai Kolok - Krung Thep Aphiwat
- Local train No. 447 / 448 Surat Thani - Sungai Kolok - Surat Thani
- Local train No. 451 / 452 Nakhon Si Thammarat - Sungai Kolok - Nakhon Si Thammarat
- Local train No. 453 / 454 Yala - Sungai Kolok - Yala
- Local train No. 463 / 464 Phatthalung - Sungai Kolok - Phatthalung
