= Cho-airong railway station =

Railway station in Chuap, Thailand

Cho-airong เจาะไอร้อง
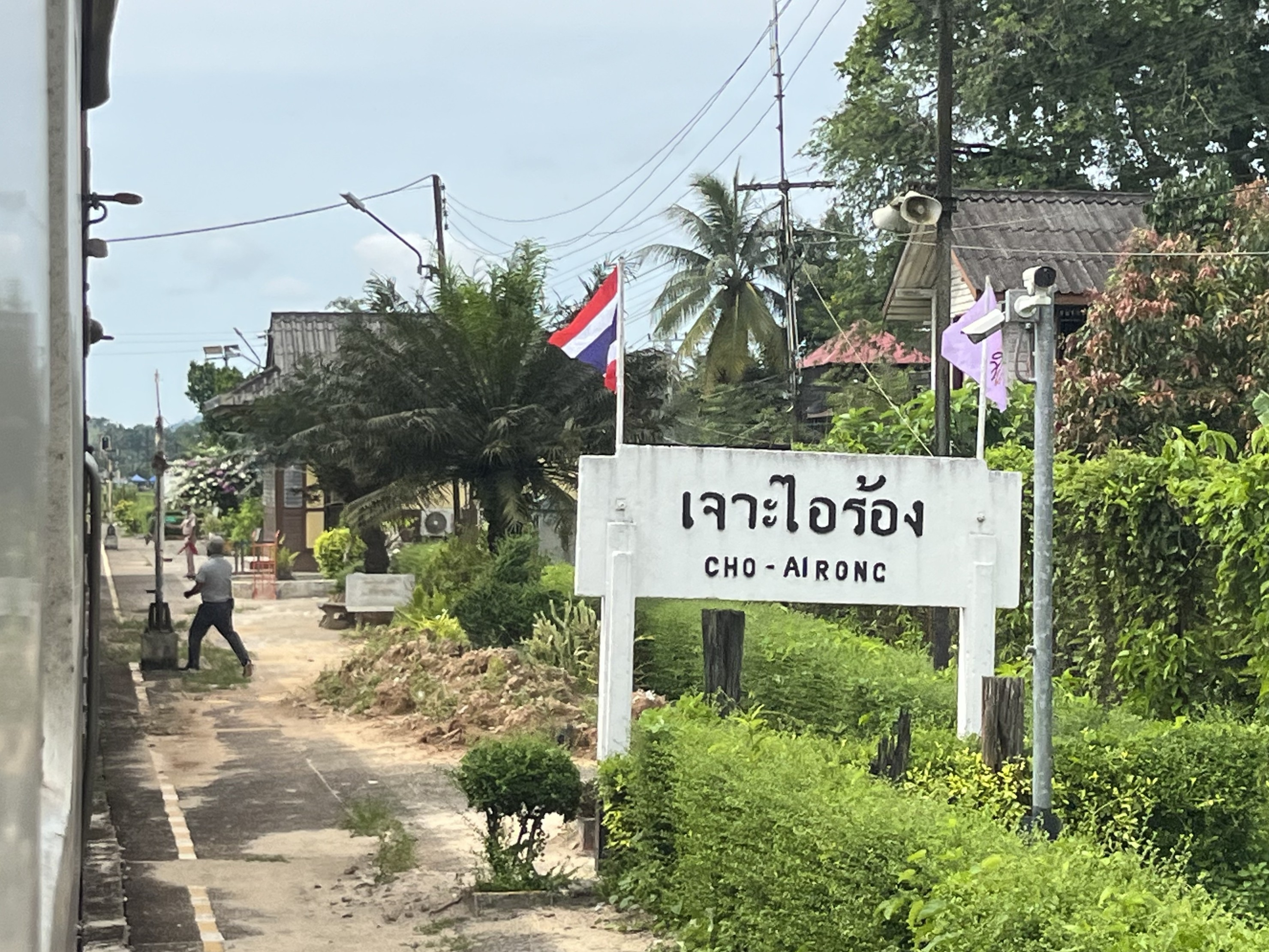

General information
- Location: Mu 1 (Ban Cho-airong), Chuap Subdistrict, Cho-airong District, Narathiwat
- Coordinates: 6.2358°N 101.8005°E
- Owner: State Railway of Thailand
- Line: Southern Line
- Platforms: 1
- Tracks: 2

Other information
- Station code: จอ.

Services
Preceding station	State Railway of Thailand	Following station
Pa Phai towards Hua Lamphong or Krung Thep Aphiwat	Southern Line	Bukit towards Su-ngai Kolok
Location

Cho-airong station (Thai: สถานีเจาะไอร้อง) is a railway station located in Chuap Subdistrict, Cho-airong District, Narathiwat. It is a class 2 railway station located 1,111.15 km (690.4 mi) from Thon Buri railway station.

== South Thailand insurgency events ==
- On 3 January 2011, separatists planted a bomb near the railway between Pa Phai-Cho-airong, followed by shootings on 3 patrol soldiers. As a result, all 3 were seriously injured and sent to Cho-airong Hospital afterwards.
- On 8 June 2011, separatists shot locals at Cho-airong railway station before igniting a hidden bomb in a vegetable-selling stall, injuring 6 people. The injured people included locals, police, military volunteers and the assistant district officer of Cho-airong District.
- In May 2014, bombs exploded on 2 railway bridges within the Cho-airong Area, causing 1–2 days suspension of rail services in the area.

All events were part of the South Thailand Insurgency.

== Services ==
- Rapid No. 171/172 Bangkok-Sungai Kolok-Bangkok
- Rapid No. 175/176 Hat Yai Junction-Sungai Kolok-Hat Yai Junction
- Local No. 447/448 Surat Thani-Sungai Kolok-Surat Thani
- Local No. 451/452 Nakhon Si Thammarat-Sungai Kolok-Nakhon Si Thammarat
- Local No. 453/454 Yala-Sungai Kolok-Yala
- Local No. 463/464 Phatthalung-Sungai Kolok-Phatthalung
