= Bukit Batu (disambiguation) =

Bukit Batu ('Stone Hill' in Indonesian and Malay) may refer to:

- Bukit Batu, mukim in Kulai District, Johor, Malaysia.
- Bukit Batu (state constituency), state constituency in Johor, Malaysia.
- Bukit Batu Lebah Recreational Forest, recreational forest in Jasin District in the Malaysian state of Malacca.
