= Zion African Methodist Episcopal Church =

Historic church in Delaware, US

- U.S. National Register of Historic Places
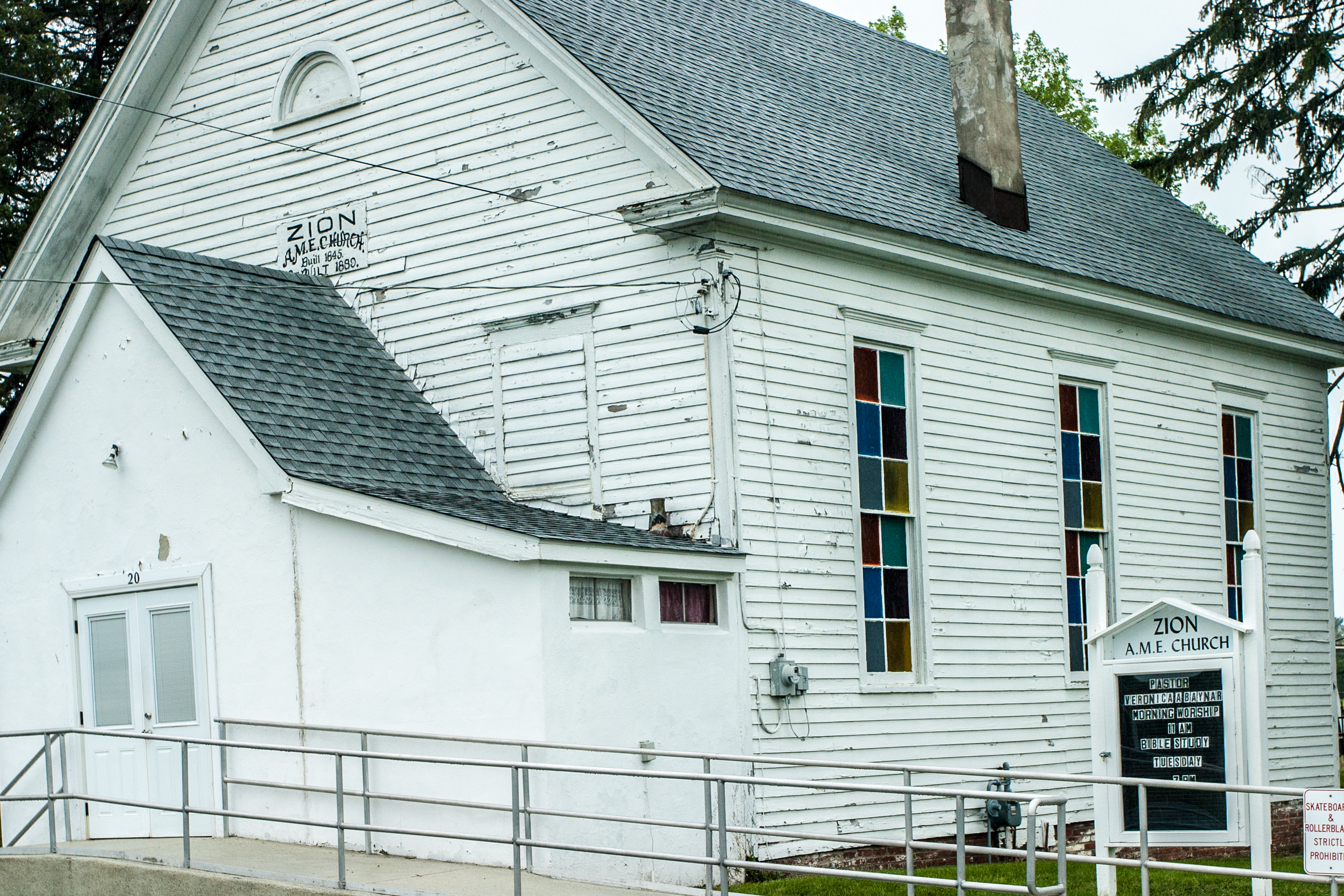
- Zion AME Church

- Location within Delaware Location within the United States
- Location: Center St., Camden, Delaware
- Coordinates: 39°7′1″N 75°33′5″W
- Area: less than one acre
- Architectural style: Classical Revival
- NRHP reference No.: 94001388
- Added to NRHP: November 25, 1994

Zion African Methodist Episcopal Church is a historic African Methodist Episcopal (AME) church and cemetery located at Camden, Delaware, United States. It was originally built in 1845 and re-built after a fire in 1889. The one-story, gable roofed frame Classical Revival-style church rests on a brick foundation. It measures 28 feet, 3 inches, wide and 36 feet, 2 inches in length. The ground around the church has been used as a cemetery since the church was established. The church is an important focal point of the community of Star Hill, an early community of African American settlement in Kent County. Zion was the first African Methodist Episcopal church in Camden, and is the mother church of nearby Star Hill AME Church.

It was added to the National Register of Historic Places in 1994.
