= Kampong (disambiguation) =

A kampong is a village in Brunei, Indonesia, Malaysia or Singapore; coincidentally also being used within toponyms in Cambodia.

Kampong may also refer to:

== Places ==
Brunei

- Kampong Bukit, village in Tutong District, Brunei

Cambodia

- Kampong Cham Province, province in Eastern Cambodia, bisected by the Mekong River
- Kampong Chhnang Province, also known as "Port of Pottery", province in Central Cambodia
- Kampong Speu Province, province in southwestern Cambodia
- Kampong Thom Province, province on the banks of the Stung Saen River in northwestern Cambodia, bordering the Tonie Sap
  - Kampong Thom (city), provincial capital of Kampong Thom Province, sometimes referred to as Kampong
- Kampong Som, another name for Sihanoukville

Singapore

- Kampong Glam, a neighbourhood in Singapore

United States

- The Kampong, a large tropical garden in Miami, Florida

Australia

- Kampong, another name for the northern settlement area on Christmas Island, Flying Fish Cove

Sri Lanka

- Kampong Kertel, another name for Slave Island, Colombo
- Kampung Pangeran, a local name for an area in Hultsdorf, Colombo
- Kampung Katukelle, another name for Katukele, Kandy
- Kampong Pensen, an area in Kandy, Sri Lanka

== Other uses ==
- Kampong (field hockey club), a Dutch field hockey club in Utrecht
- Kampong, common name for Oroxylum indicum, a tree native to South-East Asia
