= Taman Impian Putra =

Taman Impian Putra is a housing estate in Bangi, Selangor, Malaysia. It is located approximately 25 kilometres (16 mi) south of Kuala Lumpur and 30 kilometres (19 mi) from KLIA. The six-phase development was commenced in 2005 by Purcon; the first phase was completed in 2007 and the sixth in 2009. The accommodation ranges from medium-cost terraces to semi-detached houses. The development is situated next to Bandar Seri Putra and can be seen from the PLUS highway.
