= Bandar Seri Putra =

Seri Putra
- Nickname: Seri Putra
- Seri Putra shown within Malaysia
- Coordinates: 2°53′9.2″N 101°46′47.48″E
- Country: Malaysia
- State: Selangor
- Daerah: Hulu Langat
- Mukim: Kajang
- Established: 1997 AD

Government
  - Municipality: Kajang Municipal Council (MPKj)
  - YDP: Farhan Haziq Mohamed - Zon 2
  - ADUN: Nushi Mahfodz (PAS) - N24 Semenyih
  - MP: Mohd Sany Hamzan (AMANAH) - P101 Hulu Langat
- Time zone: UTC+8 (MST)
- Postcode: 43000 Kajang
- Area code: +03
- Website: www.bandarseriputra.com

Seri Putra is a township in Bangi in Hulu Langat District, Selangor, Malaysia. This township is about 30 km from Kuala Lumpur and 18 km from Kuala Lumpur International Airport. The township is some 2.5 km from the Selangor–Negeri Sembilan border.

== History ==
Developed by Bangi Heights Development Sdn Bhd, subsidiary of UM Land Bhd since 1997. Neighbouring townships are Bukit Mahkota, Taman Impian Putra, the new township of Bandar Puteri Bangi by IOI Properties Group Bhd and the Nilai Industrial Park on the neighbouring state of Negeri Sembilan.

== Amenities ==
- Klinik Kesihatan Seri Putra
- Petronas Petrol Station
- Petron Petrol Station
- Bank Simpanan Nasional, Seri Putra Branch
- Night market, every Tuesday and Saturday
- Bangi police station
- McDonald's
- Lotus's

=== Community ===
- Acacia
- Anjung Suasana
- Castanea
- D'Punchak Nusa
- D'Punchak Putra
- D'Punchak Unggul
- D'Punchak Aman
- D'Sentral
- Putra Terrace
- Laman Indah
- Legundi Residensi
- Princeton Residences
- Putra Hill Residency
- PutraOne
- Putra Terrace
- Putra Tropika
- Putra Villa
- Pangsapuri Putra Impian
- Rimbun Suria
- Vista Seri Putra
- Pangsapuri Seri Dahlia
- Pangsapuri Seri Mawar
- Pangsapuri Seri Melati
- Vesta View Bangi Apartment
- Taman Impian Putra

=== Mosque/Suraus ===
- Masjid Al-Azhar, KUIS
- Masjid Bandar Seri Putra, Bandar Seri Putra
- Surau As Syakirin - Pangsapuri Seri Melati
- Surau Al-Hijrah - Putra Tropika
- Surau Khairiyatulislamiah Seri Dahlia - Pangsapuri Seri Dahlia
- Surau Al Ikhlas, Taman Impian Putra (Surau solat Jumaat)
- Surau Syaidina Umar Al-Khattab - Puncak Nusa

== Commercial ==
No	Development project	Location	Total unit
1	SP Retail Centre (Phase 1)	Jalan Seri Putra 1/2, 1/4 & 1/5	58
2	SP Retail Centre (Phase 2 (1A))	Jalan Seri Putra 1/5 & 1/4	24
3	SP Retail Centre (Phase 2 (1B))	Jalan Seri Putra 1 (Under construction)	14
4	Single story shops	Jalan Seri Putra 3	72

== Education ==
=== Pre-school ===
- An-Nur Ilmu Montessori
- Excel Edukid Centre
- Pasti Al-Faizin
- Q-dees
- CIC Where Leaders Are Born
- Tadika Al-Fatih
- Tadika Kemas
- Tadika Krista
- Taska BondaMama
- Taska Duniaku Ceria
- Tadika Seri Pelangi
- Taska Tunas Al-Fatih
- The Little Caliphs

=== Government funded school ===
- Sekolah Kebangsaan Bandar Seri Putra
- Sekolah Kebangsaan Bandar Bukit Mahkota
- Sekolah Rendah Agama Bandar Seri Putra
- Sekolah Menengah Kebangsaan Bandar Seri Putra
- Sekolah Menengah Kebangsaan Bandar Bukit Mahkota

=== College University ===
- Empire Putra College
- Selangor Islamic University (UIS)

== Access ==
=== Car ===
Besides the aforementioned exit to PLUS, the township is also served by the Semenyih–Banting Highway Federal Route 31.

=== Public transportation ===
Smart Selangor bus KJ02 to KTM Bangi. There is also Rapid On-Demand that goes from KTM Bangi to Bandar Bukit Mahkota that can be booked using the mobile app Mobi.
