= Starr Hill =

Starr Hill may refer to:

- Starr Hill Brewery, a beer brewing company based in Crozet, Virginia
- Starr Hill, Juneau, a neighborhood in Juneau, Alaska
- Starr Hill Presents, a music promotion company founded by Coran Capshaw
- Starr Hill Township, Washington County, Arkansas, a township in Washington County, Arkansas

== See also ==
- Bukit Bintang, an entertainment district of Kuala Lumpur whose name translates to "Star Hill"
- Star Hill AME Church, a historic church in Delaware
