= Taman Bukit =

Taman Bukit ('Hill park' in Indonesian and Malay) may refer to:

- Taman Bukit Dahlia, a housing estate in Johor Bahru
- Taman Bukit Jaya, a township in Bukit Antarabangsa
- Taman Bukit Maluri, township in Segambut constituency, Kuala Lumpur, Malaysia
- Taman Bukit Mewah, a township in Bukit Antarabangsa
- Taman Bukit Mulia, a township in Bukit Antarabangsa
- Taman Bukit Mutiara, a region in Tebrau.
- Taman Bukit Pasir, a township in Bandar Penggaram, Batu Pahat, Johor, Malaysia.
- Taman Bukit Tiram, a housing estate in Johor Bahru
- Taman Bukit Utama, a township in Bukit Antarabangsa

== See also ==
- Bukit (disambiguation)
- Taman (disambiguation)
