= Bukit Tambun (disambiguation) =

Bukit Tambun is a suburb of Seberang Perai in the Malaysian state of Penang.

Bukit Tengah may also refer to:

- Bukit Tambun (state constituency), state constituency in Penang, Malaysia
- Bukit Tambun F.C., football club based in the suburb
