= Pa Phai railway station =

Railway station in Tanyong Limo, Thailand

Pa Phai ป่าไผ่
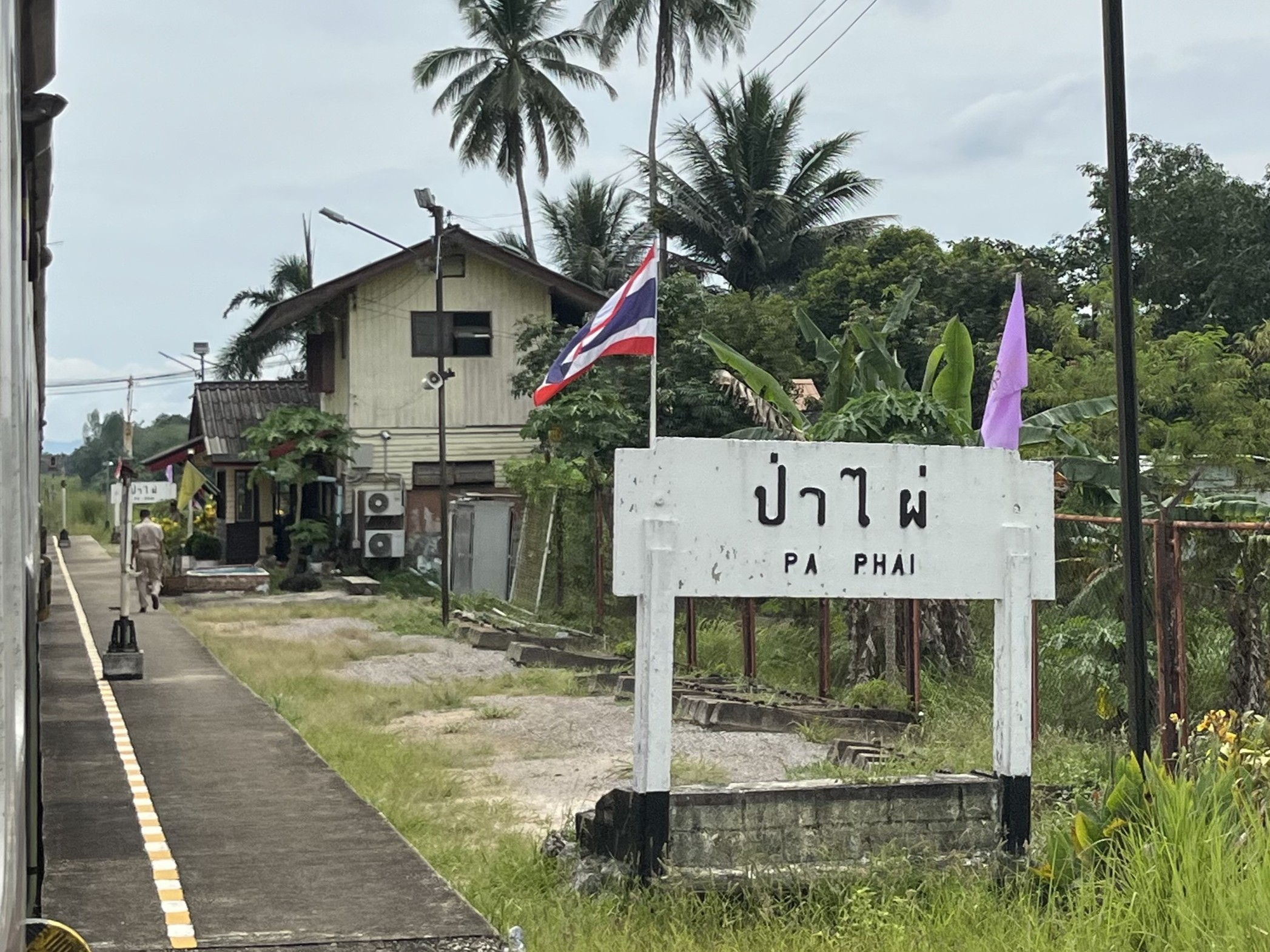

General information
- Location: Mu 5 (Ban Pa Phai), Tanyong Limo Subdistrict, Ra-ngae District, Narathiwat
- Coordinates: 6.2673°N 101.7597°E
- Owner: State Railway of Thailand
- Line: Southern Line
- Platforms: 1
- Tracks: 2

Other information
- Station code: ปผ.

Services
Preceding station	State Railway of Thailand	Following station
Tanyong Mat towards Hua Lamphong or Krung Thep Aphiwat	Southern Line	Cho-airong towards Su-ngai Kolok
Location

Pa Phai railway station is a railway station located in Tanyong Limo Subdistrict, Ra-ngae District, Narathiwat. It is a class 3 railway station located 1,105.454 km (686.9 mi) from Thon Buri railway station.

== South Thailand insurgency events ==
- On 30 March 2007, a separatist bomb exploded in a ditch in front of the station. No one was injured and train services could stop or pass the station as normal.

== Services ==
- Local No. 447/448 Surat Thani-Sungai Kolok-Surat Thani
- Local No. 451/452 Nakhon Si Thammarat-Sungai Kolok-Nakhon Si Thammarat
- Local No. 453/454 Yala-Sungai Kolok-Yala
- Local No. 463/464 Phatthalung-Sungai Kolok-Phatthalung
