= Star Hill, Delaware =

Unincorporated community in Delaware, United States

- Unincorporated community
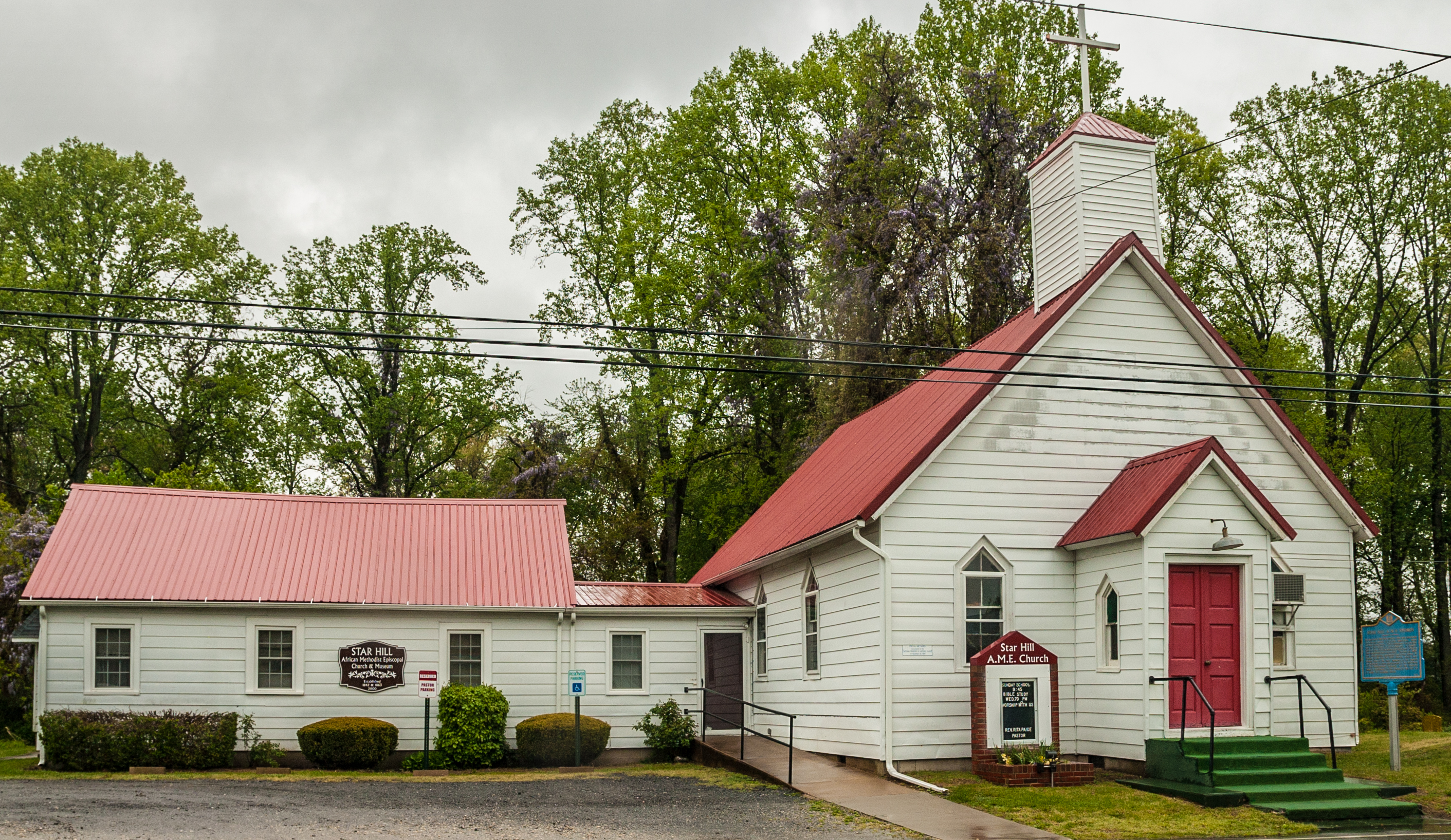
- Star Hill AME Church

- Location within Delaware Location within the United States
- Coordinates: 39°06′19″N 75°32′26″W
- Country: United States
- State: Delaware
- County: Kent
- Elevation: 36 ft (11 m)
- Time zone: UTC-5 (Eastern (EST))
  - Summer (DST): UTC-4 (EDT)
- Area code: 302
- GNIS feature ID: 214689

Star Hill is an unincorporated community in Kent County, Delaware, United States. Star Hill is located at the intersection of U.S. Route 13 and Voshells Mill Road/Voshells Mill Star Hill Road, south of Camden.

Star Hill was an early community of African American settlement in Kent County. The Star Hill AME Church is located in Star Hill; the church served as a safe haven along the Underground Railroad and held anti-slavery meetings. Today the church is home to the Star Hill Museum, which features exhibits about African American history in Kent County, slavery and the Underground Railroad.
