= Bukit Saban =

Bukit Saban is a town in the district of Spaoh, Betong Division, Sarawak. The area was a tourist resort, but went bankrupt and was closed down. The resort has since been converted into a Malaysian National Service training camp for government officers.
