= Bukit railway station =

Railway station in Bukit, Thailand

Bukit บูกิต
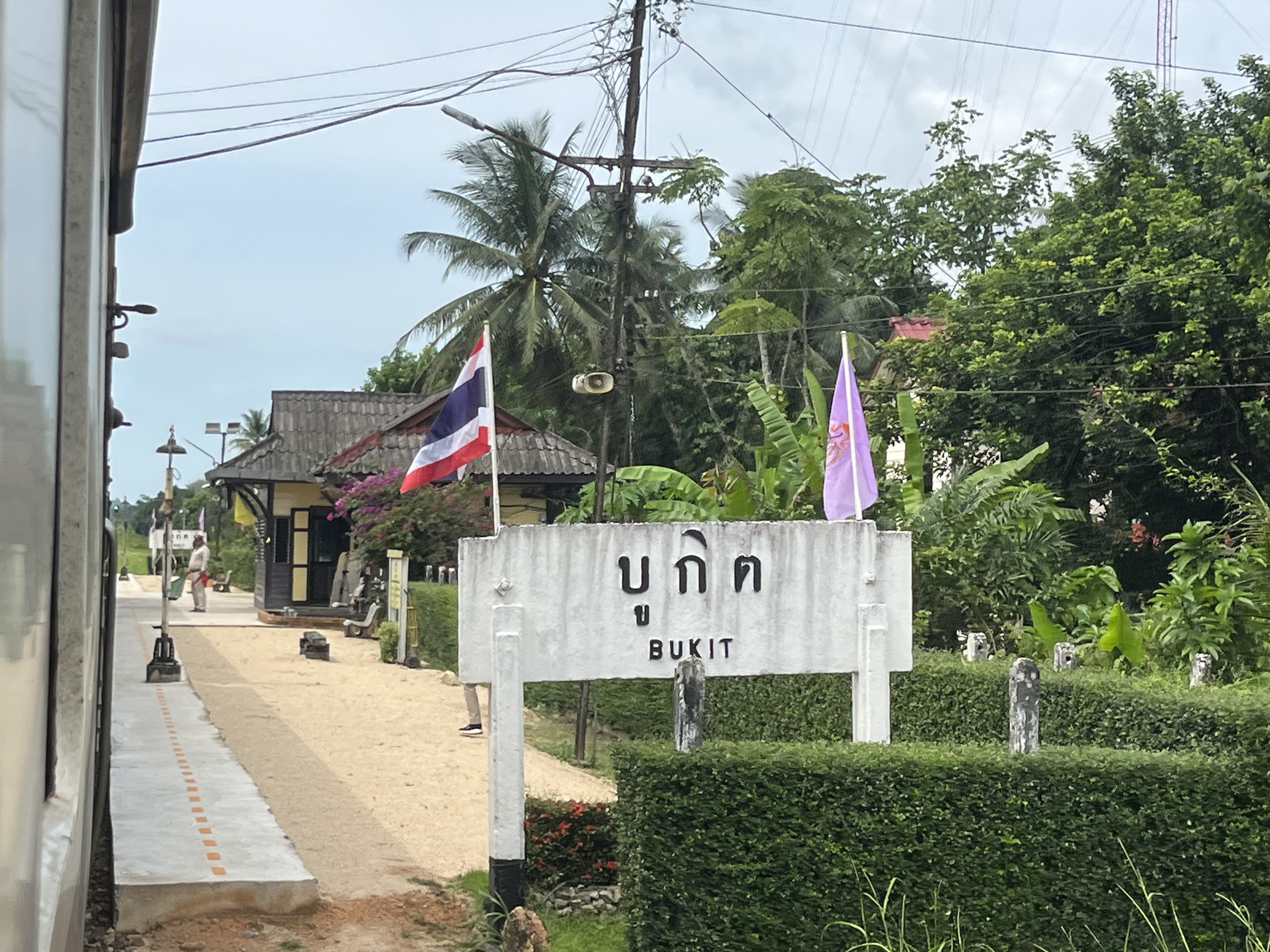

General information
- Location: Mu 3 (Ban Sathani Bukit), Bukit Subdistrict, Cho-airong District, Narathiwat
- Coordinates: 6.1982°N 101.8188°E
- Owner: State Railway of Thailand
- Line: Southern Line
- Platforms: 1
- Tracks: 2

Other information
- Station code: บู.

Services
Preceding station	State Railway of Thailand	Following station
Cho-airong towards Hua Lamphong or Krung Thep Aphiwat	Southern Line	Ai Satia Halt towards Su-ngai Kolok
Location

Bukit station (Thai: สถานีบูกิต) is a railway station located in Bukit Subdistrict, Cho-airong District, Narathiwat. It is a class 3 railway station located 1,115.83 km (693.3 mi) from Thon Buri railway station.

The name derives from the word 'Bukit', which means "hill" in Malay.

== South Thailand insurgency events ==
- On 17 July 2010, separatists shot two grenades at Bukit Railway Station, using an M79 grenade launcher. The shootings occurred at around 22:00, when all train services in the Hat Yai-Sungai Kolok area had been finished. No one was injured from the bombings. The first grenade crater was found about 5 metres to the right of the station building, and was 6 inches wide and 5 inches deep, with M79 shrapnel surrounding the area. The second grenade crater was found in a rambutan plantation next to a military patrol base in front of the station, which was 8 inches wide and 6 inches deep.
- On 28 August 2012, separatists shot Local Train No. 447 Surat Thani-Sungai Kolok between Bukit-Ai Satia, causing 1 fatality and 2 seriously injured. All casualties were military volunteers. The locomotive and all 6 bogies were all found to have bullet holes. The shootings occurred 2 times, the first about 500 metres from Bukit Station and the second at a military railway patrol base.

== Services ==
- Local No. 447/448 Surat Thani-Sungai Kolok-Surat Thani
- Local No. 451/452 Nakhon Si Thammarat-Sungai Kolok-Nakhon Si Thammarat
- Local No. 453/454 Yala-Sungai Kolok-Yala
- Local No. 463/464 Phatthalung-Sungai Kolok-Phatthalung
