= Bukit Perai Protection Forest =

Indonesian nature reserve

- IUCN category VI (protected area with sustainable use of natural resources)

The Bukit Perai Protection Forest is found on the island of Borneo in Indonesia. This site is 1000 km^{2}.
