= Bukit Timah (disambiguation) =

Bukit Timah may refer to:

- Bukit Timah, Central Region of Singapore
  - Bukit Timah Expressway
  - Bukit Timah Race Course
  - Bukit Timah railway station
  - Bukit Timah Satellite Earth Station
- Bukit Timah Hill, in Bukit Panjang, West Region of Singapore
  - Bukit Timah Nature Reserve
  - Bukit Timah Road

== See also ==
- Bukit Timah Monkey Man, a cryptid said to inhabit the Bukit Timah forest
- Holland–Bukit Timah Group Representation Constituency, a political constituency that serves Bukit Timah
- Battle of Bukit Timah, a battle fought during the Battle of Singapore
- Former Bukit Timah Fire Station, a former fire station
