= Bukit Kiara (disambiguation) =

Bukit Kiara ('Enclose Hill' in Malay) may refer to:

- Bukit Kiara, densely forested area of Kuala Lumpur, Malaysia.
- Bukit Kiara MRT station, future mass rapid transit (MRT) station on the MRT Circle Line.
- Bukit Kiara Selatan MRT station, future mass rapid transit (MRT) station on the MRT Circle Line and Kajang Line.
- Bukit Kiara Muslim Cemetery, cemetery in Kuala Lumpur, Malaysia.
- Bukit Kiara Sports Complex, main sports complex in Bukit Kiara, Kuala Lumpur, Malaysia.
