= Bukit Raja (disambiguation) =

Bukit Raja ('King's Hill' in Indonesian and Malay) may refer to:

- Bukit Raja, mukim in Petaling District, Selangor, Malaysia
- Bukit Raja Interchange
- Bukit Raja Selatan LRT station, provisional light rapid transit (LRT) station in Selangor, Malaysia
