= Bukit Chandu (disambiguation) =

Bukit Chandu ('Opium Hill' in Indonesian and Malay) may refer to:

- Bukit Chandu, hill in Kent Ridge in Singapore.
- Battle of Bukit Chandu
- Reflections at Bukit Chandu, World War II interpretive centre developed and managed by the National Archives of Singapore.
