= Bukit Nanas (disambiguation) =

Bukit Nanas ("Pineapple Hill" in Indonesian and Malay) may refer to:

- Bukit Nanas, small hill in Kuala Lumpur, Malaysia
- Bukit Nanas Monorail station, Malaysian elevated monorail train station
- Convent Bukit Nanas, all-girls school located at Bukit Nanas, Kuala Lumpur, Malaysia
