= Bukit Batu Lebah Recreational Forest =

Recreational forest in Jasin, Malacca, Malaysia

Bukit Batu Lebah Recreational Forest Malay: Hutan Rekreasi Bukit Batu Lebah
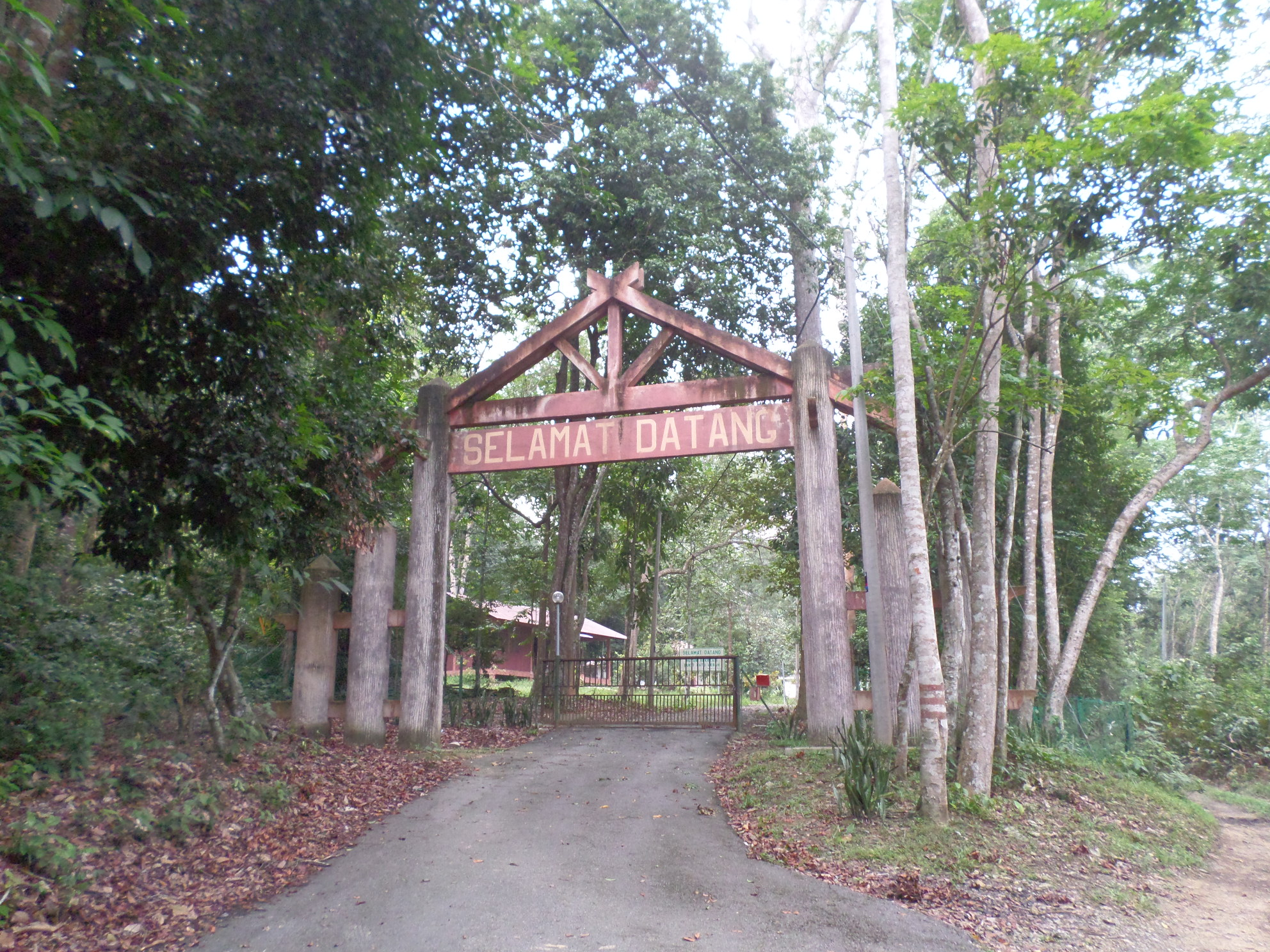

- Location within Malacca
- Interactive map of Bukit Batu Lebah Recreational Forest

Geography
- Location: Jasin, Malacca, Malaysia
- Coordinates: 2°23′56.2″N 102°25′43.3″E

Administration
- Authority: Forestry Department of Peninsular Malaysia

The Bukit Batu Lebah Recreational Forest (Malay: Hutan Rekreasi Bukit Batu Lebah) is a recreational forest located within the Bukit Senggeh Forest Reserve in Jasin District in the Malaysian state of Malacca. It offers recreational activities such as hiking and caving/cave exploration.

== See also ==
- Geography of Malaysia
- List of tourist attractions in Malacca
