= Kampong (Cambodia) =

Term used within Cambodian place names

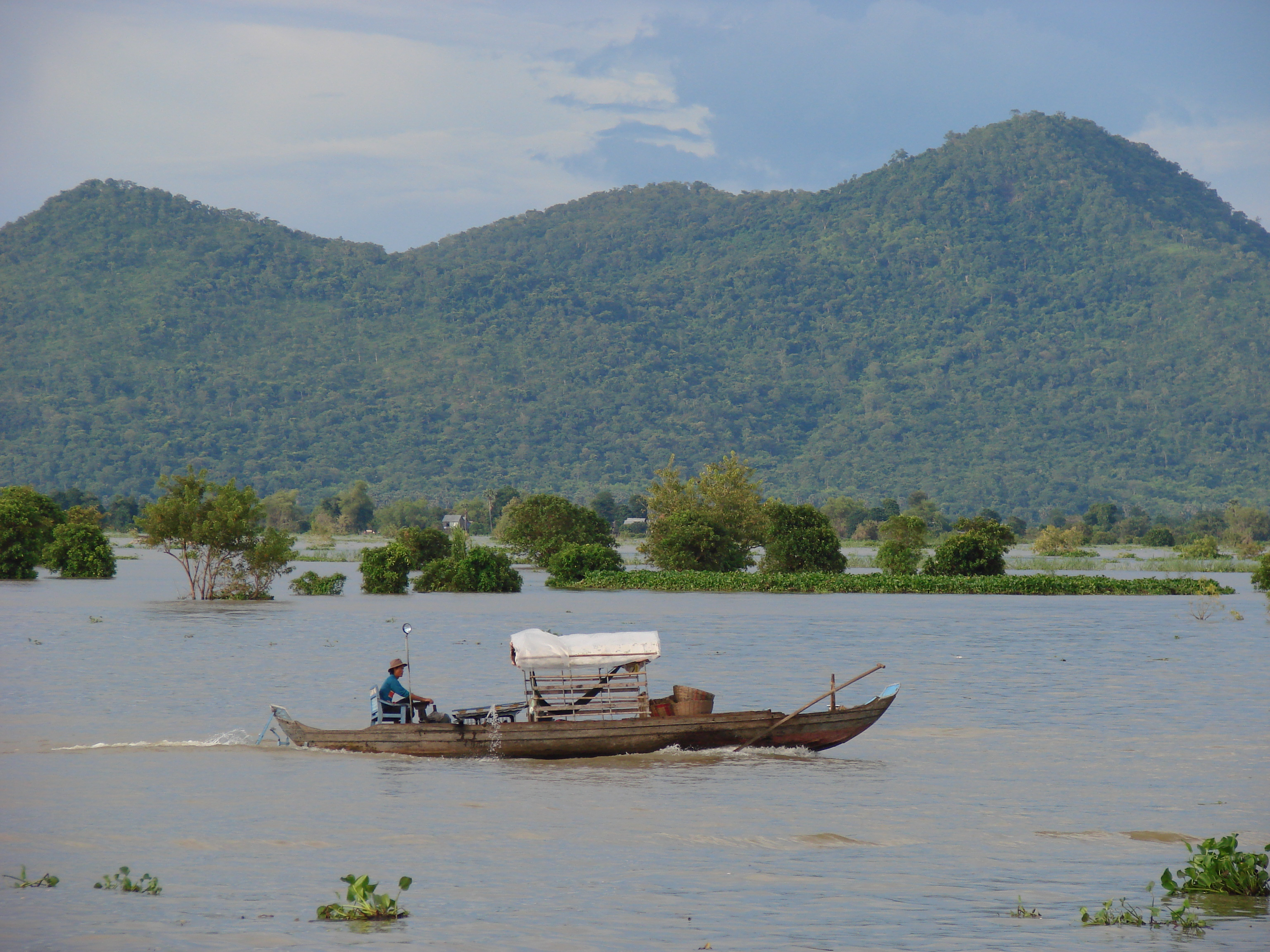
Photo taken at Kongrei mountain in Kampong Chhnang province, Cambodia

The term kampong (Khmer: កំពង់; Khmer pronunciation: [kɑm.ˈpŭəŋ]) is used in many topynyms within Cambodia, referring to a port or freshwater settlement.

== Etymology ==
The word is ultimately derived from Old Khmer kaṃvaṅ, referring to an inclination in geography. It is a false cognate of the Malay: kampung.

== Use ==
The term kampong has been widely used in Cambodia to name places such as provinces, districts, communes and villages. Some examples include: the provinces of Kampong Som (ក្រុងកំពង់សោម; currently Sihanoukville), Kampong Thom (ខេត្តកំពង់ធំ), Kampong Chhnang (ខេត្តកំពង់ឆ្នាំង), and Kampong Speu (ខេត្តកំពង់ស្ពឺ); the districts of Kampong Trach (ស្រុកកំពង់ត្រាច), Kampong Trolach (ស្រុកកំពង់ត្រឡាច), and Kampong Siem (ស្រុកកំពង់សៀម); the communes of Kampong Khleang (ឃុំកំពង់ឃ្លាំង) and Kampong Kdei (ឃុំកំពង់ក្តី); and the villages of Kampong Prasat (ភូមិកំពង់ប្រាសាទ), Kampong Krabei (ភូមិកំពង់ក្របី), and Kampong Our (ភូមិកំពង់អ៊ួរ).

== Connotations and socioeconomics ==
Many kampongs are categorized by having agrarian-based economies. Some are floating cities composed of stilt houses, which have been target to forced relocation and subsequent development.
