= Bukit Gantang (disambiguation) =

Bukit Gantang may refer to:

- Bukit Gantang
- Bukit Gantang (federal constituency), federal constituency in Larut, Matang and Selama District, Perak, Malaysia.
