= Bukit Mertajam (disambiguation) =

Bukit Mertajam may refer to:

- Bukit Mertajam
- Bukit Mertajam (federal constituency), represented in the Dewan Rakyat
- Bukit Mertajam (state constituency), formerly represented in the Penang State Legislative Assembly (1959–74), see List of Malaysian State Assembly Representatives (1969–1974)
- Pekan Bukit Mertajam (state constituency), formerly represented in the Penang State Legislative Assembly (1974–86), see List of Malaysian State Assembly Representatives (1982–1986)
- Bukit Mertajam (settlement constituency), formerly represented in the Penang Settlement Council (1955–59), see List of Malayan State and Settlement Council Representatives (1954–1959)
