= Bukit Kayu Hitam (disambiguation) =

Bukit Kayu Hitam ('Black Wood Hill' in Indonesian and Malay) may refer to:

- Bukit Kayu Hitam, small town in Kubang Pasu District, Kedah, Malaysia.
- Bukit Kayu Hitam (state constituency), state constituency in Kedah, Malaysia.
