= Bukit Bendera =

Bukit Bendera may refer to:

- Penang Hill
- Bukit Bendera, Brunei, area in Tutong, town of Tutong District, Brunei
- Bukit Bendera (federal constituency), represented in the Dewan Rakyat
- Former Malay name for Fort Canning Hill, Singapore
- Former Malay name for Mount Faber, Singapore
