= Bukit Pasir (disambiguation) =

Bukit Pasir ('Sand Hill' in Indonesian and Malay) may refer to:

- Bukit Pasir, small town in Muar District, Johor, Malaysia
- Bukit Pasir (state constituency), state constituency in Johor, Malaysia
- Taman Bukit Pasir, township in Bandar Penggaram, Batu Pahat, Johor, Malaysia
