= Bukit Tinggi =

Places called Bukit Tinggi (Malay and Indonesian for high hill) are:

- Bukittinggi, West Sumatra, Indonesia
- Bandar Bukit Tinggi, Klang, Selangor, Malaysia
- Bukit Tinggi, Pahang, Malaysia
