= Kaki Bukit (disambiguation) =

Kaki Bukit is a small town in Perlis, Malaysia.

Kaki Bukit may also refer to:

- Kaki Bukit, Singapore
- Kaki Bukit (state constituency)

== See also ==
- Kaki Bukit Constituency
- Kaki Bukit SC
- Kaki Bukit MRT station
