= Kampong Bukit Beruang =

Kampong Bukit Beruang may refer to:

- Bukit Beruang, a settlement area in Melaka, Malaysia
- Kampong Bukit Beruang, Brunei, a settlement in Brunei
