= Bukit Kerang =

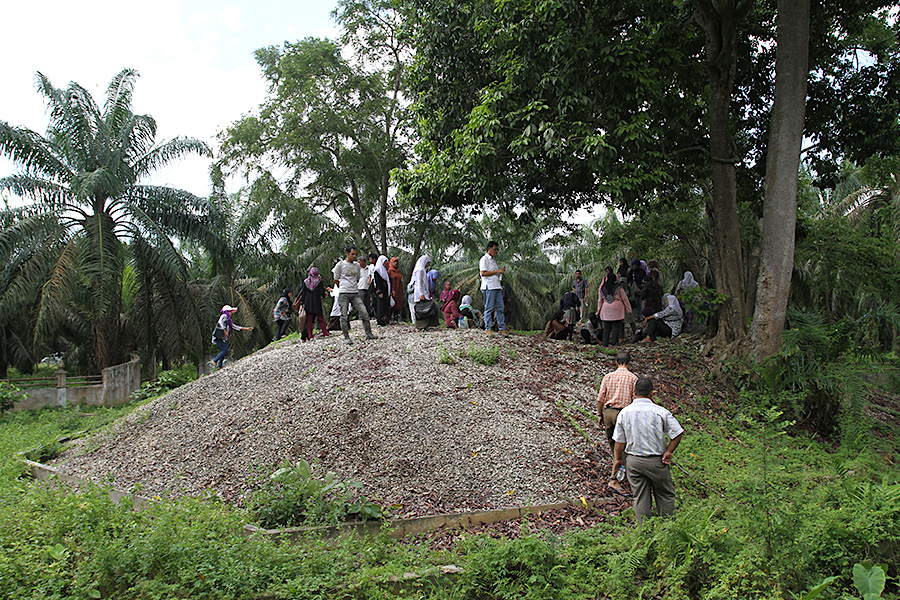
The Shell Mound (Bukit Kerang) in Aceh Tamiang

Bukit Remis Pangkalan, also known as the Pangkalan Shell Mound Site, is a prehistoric hunter-gatherer archaeological site located in Aceh Tamiang Regency, Aceh Province. This site is part of a larger complex of shell middens stretching over 300 km from Batu Bara Regency, North Sumatra, to Lhokseumawe.

The primary remains found at the site are kjokkenmoddinger, which are heaps of shell waste. Derived from the Danish words køkken (kitchen) and mødding (refuse/mound), these middens consist of mollusk shells accumulated over thousands of years, forming small hills reaching heights of 4–9 meters.

== History ==
In 1927, H. M. E. Schürmann and Pieter Vincent van Stein Callenfels conducted research at the shell mound site. They discovered that Australo-Melanesoid populations inhabited the region between 10,000 and 8,000 years ago. These people gathered marine shells as a daily food source and discarded the shells in centralized mounds. Additionally, E. Edwards McKinnon conducted an inventory of findings related to the Hoabinhian culture along the eastern coast of Sumatra.

In 1996, research continued with surveys of shell mound sites and contemporary prehistoric sites in North Sumatra. Excavations at the Bukit Remis site began the following year, though the project faced several delays before resuming in 2007. This research identified traces of prehistoric human activity categorized into two types: surface finds and excavated finds.

Surface findings included an anvil and stone flakes made of andesite, a short-axe (*hache courte*), raw materials for stone tool production, grinding stones (pipisan), lithic debitage, and pottery fragments. Meanwhile, the excavation results consisted of various artifacts, ecofacts, and non-artifactual features.
