= Bukit Katil (disambiguation) =

Bukit Katil may refer to:

- Bukit Katil, mukim and town in Melaka Tengah District, Malacca, Malaysia.
- Bukit Katil (federal constituency), federal constituency in Malacca, Malaysia.
- Bukit Katil (state constituency), state constituency in Malacca, Malaysia.

== See also ==
- Jalan Bukit Katil, dual-carriageway state road in Malacca state, Malaysia.
