= Bukit Tengah (disambiguation) =

Bukit Tengah is an industrial area in Central Seberang Perai District, Penang, Malaysia.

Bukit Tengah may also refer to:

- Bukit Tengah (state constituency), state constituency in Penang, Malaysia
- Bukit Tengah railway station, Malaysian railway station
