= Bukit Bunga (disambiguation) =

Bukit Bunga ('Flower Hill' in Indonesian and Malay) may refer to:

- Bukit Bunga, village in Tanah Merah District, Kelantan, Malaysia.
- Bukit Bunga (state constituency), state constituency in Kelantan, Malaysia.

== See also ==
- Bukit Bunga–Ban Buketa Bridge, bridge crossing the Kolok River at the Malaysia–Thailand border.
