= Setia Indah =

Suburb in Johor Bahru, Johor, Malaysia

Coordinates: 1°34′20.7″N 103°45′37.8″E

Setia Indah is a township in Johor Bahru, Johor, Malaysia.

== History ==
The 888 acre freehold development was launched in January 2001. It is SP Setia's second project in Johor and has a GDV of RM1.8 billion. The township features a town park near its commercial area and has won numerous awards for its unique design and landscaping in the country. In 2007, a police station is established within the township and this has greatly reduced the crime rate in the area. A market was later built, as well as a supermarket (Maslee). The commercial area consist mainly of hawker centres and service outlets. Setia Indah is now a mature, self contained township with a population of approximately 35,000 people and has only less than 5% of land left to develop, which has been allocated for schools and commercial developments.

== Development ==
The township contains mostly terraced house, cluster house, semi-detached house, bungalows, serviced apartments, as well as commercial units. The landed homes are spread over various precincts, which are gated and guarded with security personnel round-the-clock doing rounds in the township.

== Amenities ==
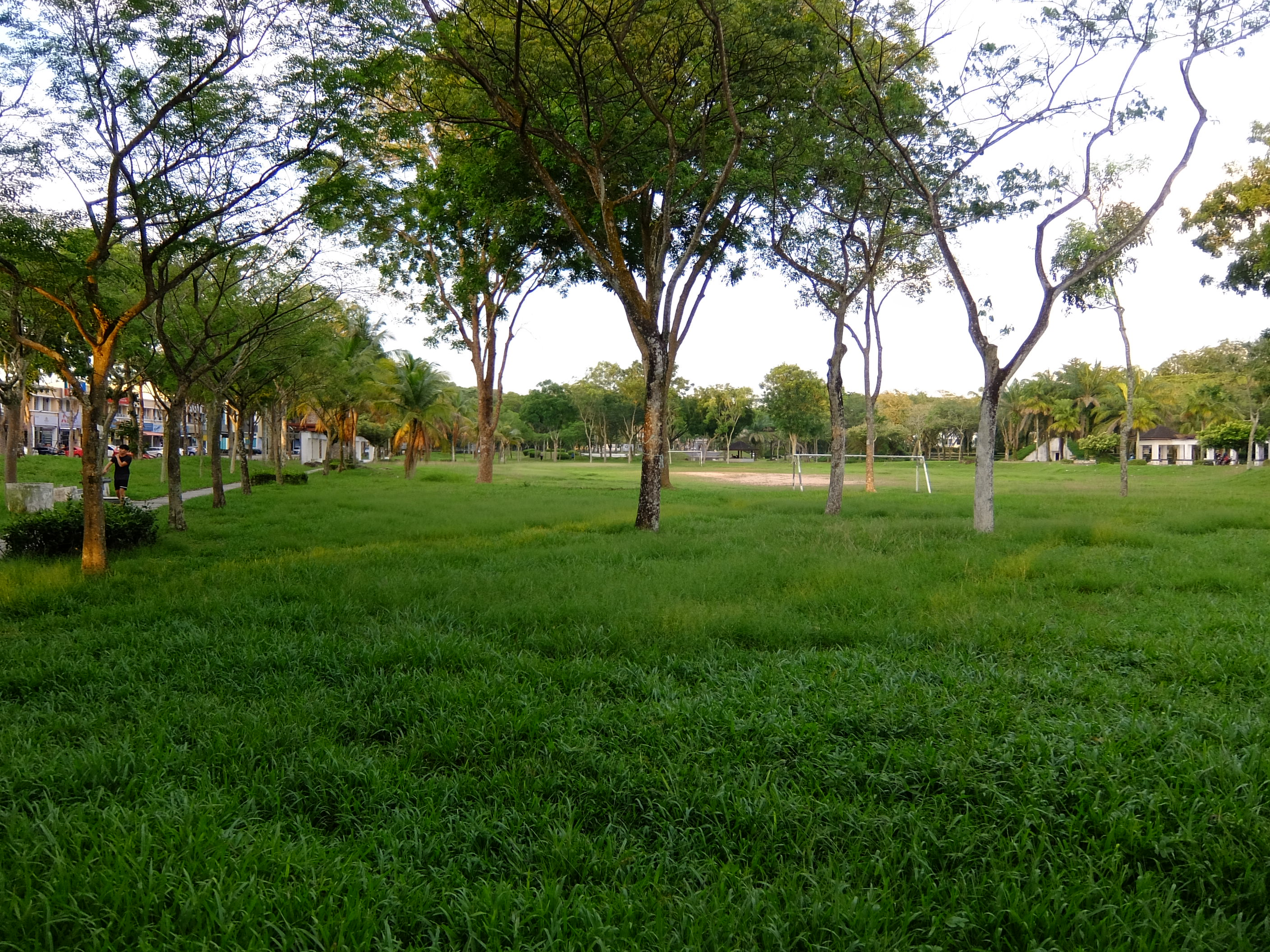
Setia Indah Park

Amenities surrounding Setia Indah are:

- Setia Indah Park
- Maslee Supermarket
- AEON MALL Bandar Dato' Onn
- Toppen Shopping Centre
- Fairview International School
- Austin Heights International School
- KPJ Bandar Dato' Onn
- Wat Traimitr Withayaram Johor

== Transportation ==
The township is accessible by many highways, including the North-South Expressway, Pasir Gudang Highway, Eastern Dispersal Link, and the Tebrau Highway. Other modern townships surrounding Setia Indah include Seri Austin, Bandar Dato' Onn, Taman Daya, and Taman Jaya Putra Perdana.
