= Bukit Merah Lake Railway Bridge =

Bukit Merah Lake Railway Bridge Jambatan Keretapi Tasik Bukit Merah
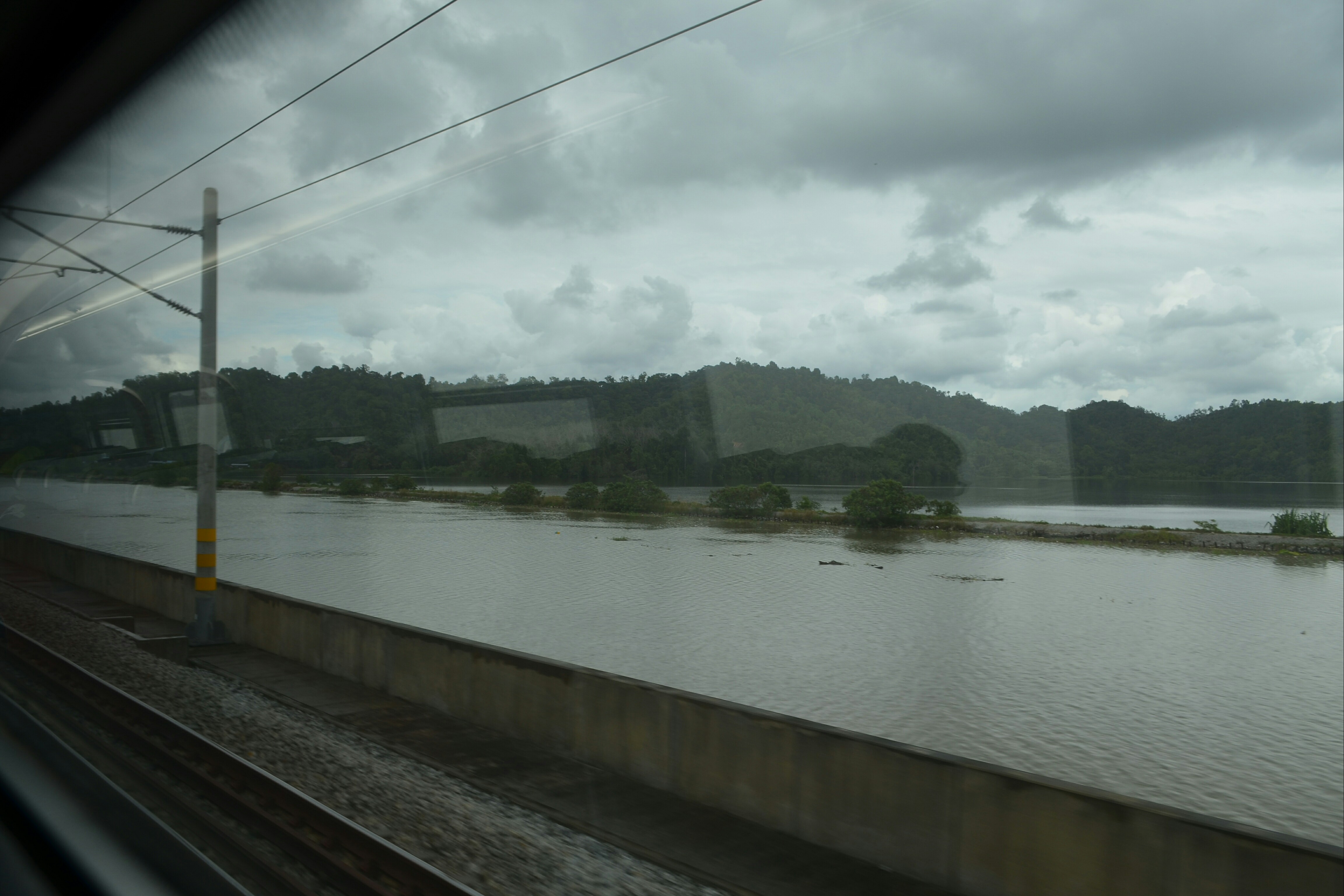
- View of Bukit Merah lake and its old causeway from an ETS train crossing the Bukit Merah Lake Railway Bridge in January 2017
- Coordinates: 5°02′21″N 100°39′55″E
- Carries: Locomotive
- Crosses: Bukit Merah Lake
- Locale: Taiping-Bukit Mertajam railway line
- Official name: Bukit Merah Lake Railway Bridge
- Maintained by: Keretapi Tanah Melayu Berhad (KTMB)

Characteristics
- Design: box girder bridge
- Total length: 3.45 km

History
- Opened: 2013

The Bukit Merah Lake Railway Bridge or Bukit Merah Marine Viaduct is a double track railway bridge across Bukit Merah Lake in the state of Perak, Malaysia. Completed in 2013, the 3.45 km double track railway bridge replaced the single track railway causeway crossing the lake.
