= Bukit Rimau (disambiguation) =

Bukit Rimau ("Tiger Hill" in Indonesian and Malay) is a township in Shah Alam, Klang District, Selangor, Malaysia.

== See also ==
- Tiger Hill (disambiguation)
