= Bukit Larut (disambiguation) =

Bukit Larut ('Late Hill' in Indonesian and Malay) may refer to:

- Bukit Larut, hill resort in Malaysia located in the state of Perak, Malaysia
- Jalan Bukit Larut, federal road in Perak, Malaysia.

== See also ==
- Acanthosaura bintangensis, also as Bukit Larut Mountain horned agamid
- Pseudocalotes larutensis, also as Bukit Larut false garden lizard
