= Bukit Jalil (disambiguation) =

Bukit Jalil may refer to:

- Bukit Jalil, affluent suburb in Kuala Lumpur, Malaysia.
- Bukit Jalil Highway, major highway in Klang Valley, Malaysia.
- Bukit Jalil LRT station, LRT station in Kuala Lumpur, Malaysia.
- Bukit Jalil National Stadium, Stadium in Kuala Lumpur, Malaysia.
- Bukit Jalil Sports School, the first sports school in Malaysia.
- Bukit Jalil National Secondary School, secondary school in Kuala Lumpur, Malaysia.

== See also ==
- Pavilion Bukit Jalil, shopping mall in Bukit Jalil, Kuala Lumpur, Malaysia.
