= Simpang Ampat, Seberang Perai =

Simpang Ampat
- Neighbourhood of Seberang Perai
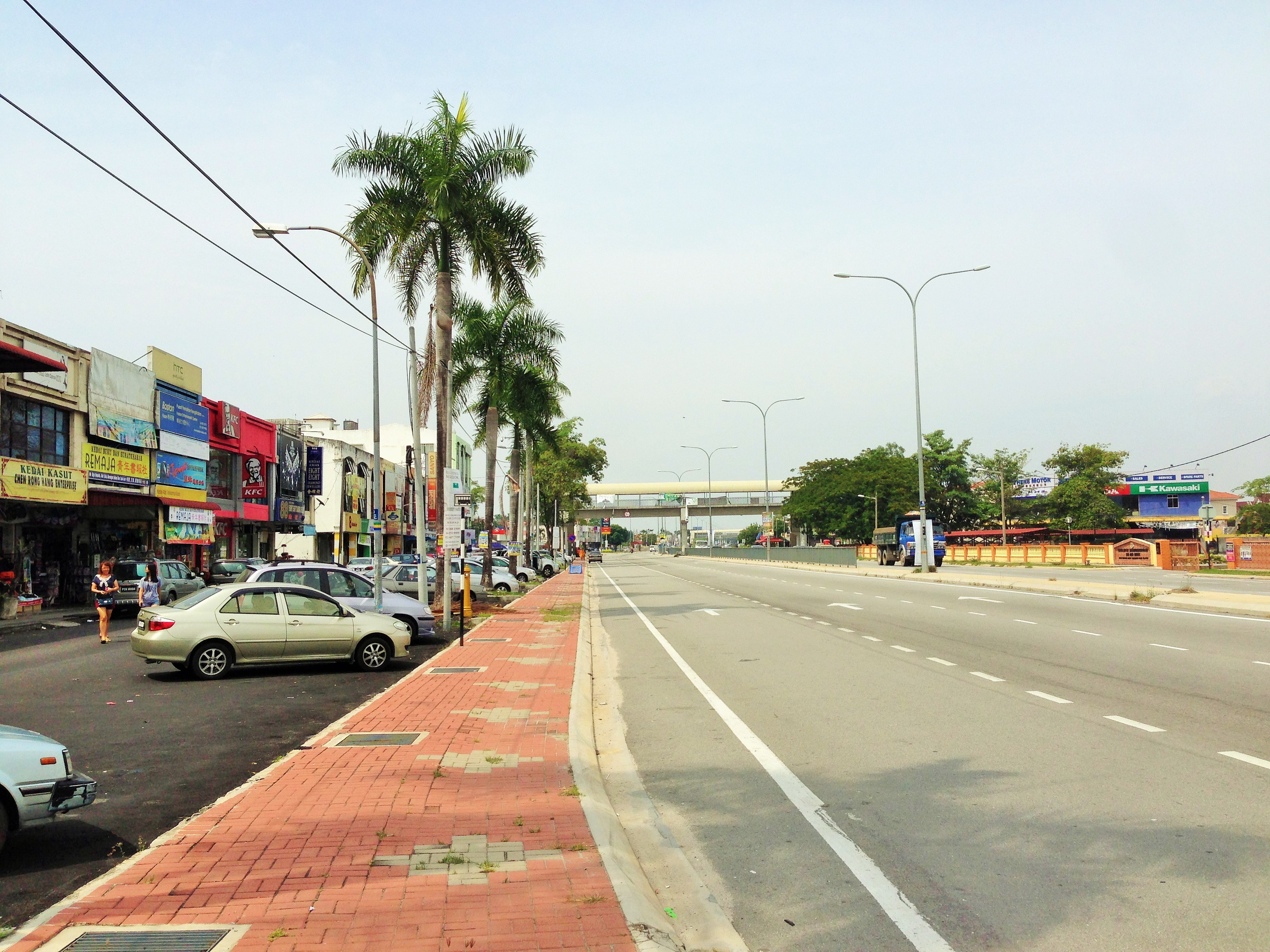

- Location within Seberang Perai in Penang
- Coordinates: 5°19′0″N 100°31′0″E
- Country: Malaysia
- State: Penang
- City: Seberang Perai
- District: South Seberang Perai
- Time zone: UTC+8 (MST)
  - Summer (DST): Not observed
- Postal code: 14xxx

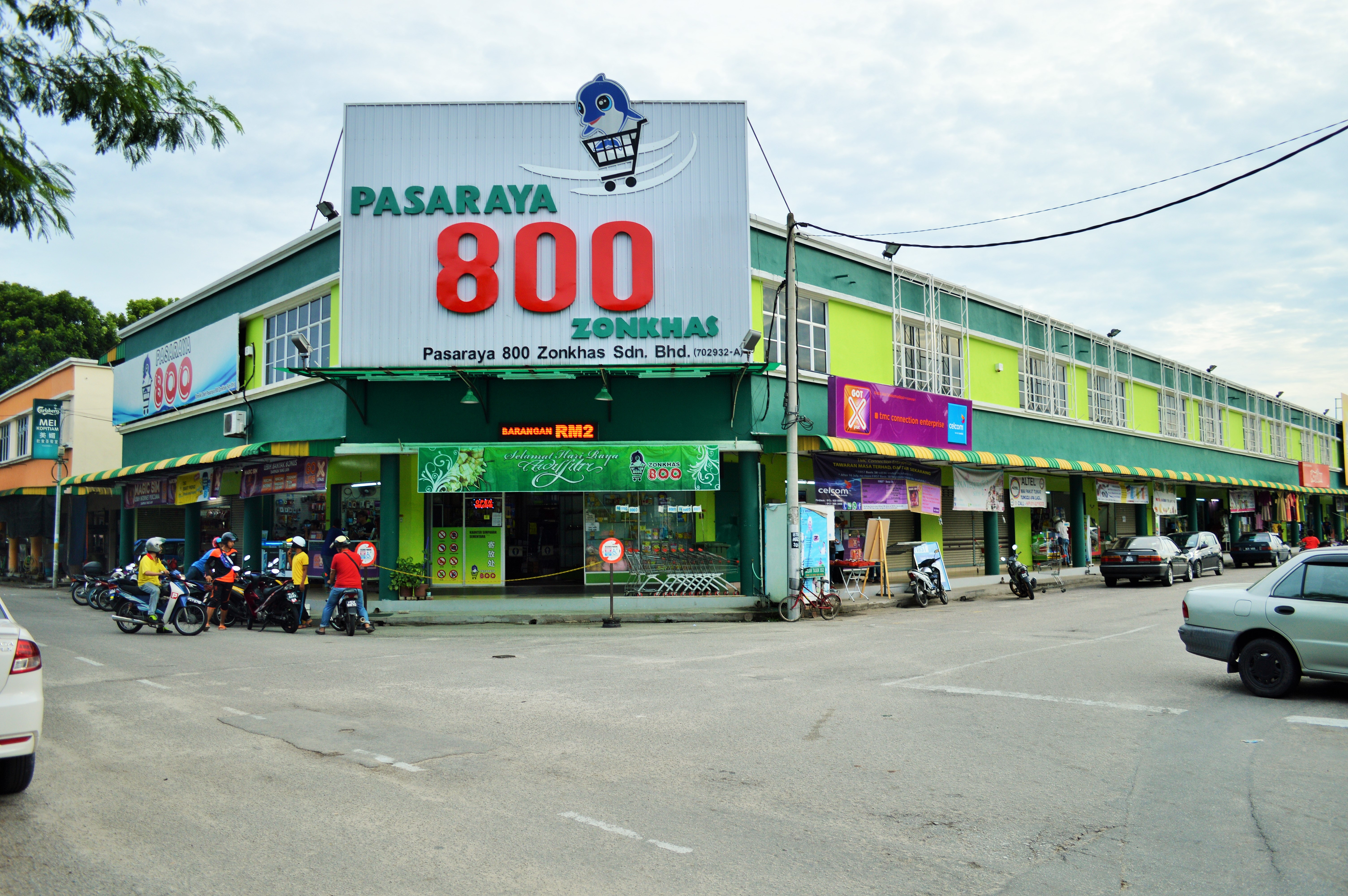
Pasaraya 800 Zonkhas supermarket along Jalan Tasek SS2, Bandar Tasek Mutiara, Simpang Ampat.

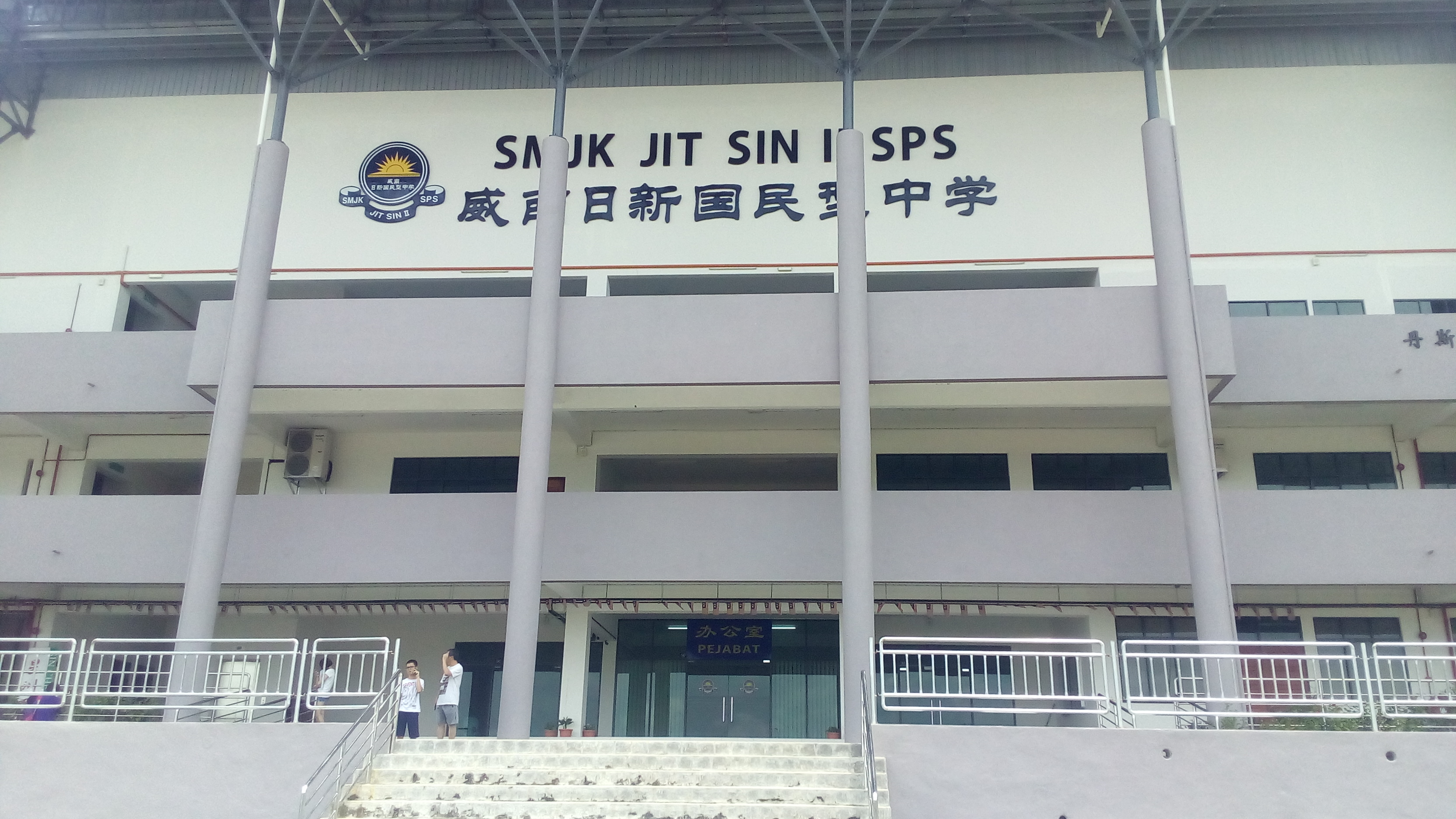
SMJK Jit Sin II SPS

Simpang Ampat (also spelt as Simpang Empat) is a residential neighbourhood within the city of Seberang Perai in the Malaysian state of Penang.

It borders Bukit Mertajam town to the north, Junjung town to the east, Sungai Bakap town to the south, and Batu Kawan town to the west.

== See also ==
- Batu Kawan
- Bukit Tambun
- South Seberang Perai District
