= Bukit Ho Swee (disambiguation) =

Bukit Ho Swee may refer to:

- Bukit Ho Swee, subzone within the planning area of Bukit Merah, Singapore.
- Bukit Ho Swee (TV series), Singaporean Chinese language TV series.
- Bukit Ho Swee Constituency, constituency in Singapore.
- Bukit Ho Swee fire, conflagration that broke out in the squatter settlement of Bukit Ho Swee, Singapore on 25 May 1961.
