= Kampong Bukit Belalong =

Coordinates: 4°28′N 115°10′E

Bukit Belalong
- Kampong
- Interactive map of Bukit Belalong
- Country: Brunei
- District: Temburong
- Mukim: Amo

Kampong Bukit Belalong is a village in Brunei.

== Administration ==
Kampong Bukit Belalong is administered as a part of Amo, Temburong District.
