= Bukit Mahkota =

Township in Selangor, Malaysia

Coordinates: 2°52′45.1″N 101°48′07.0″E

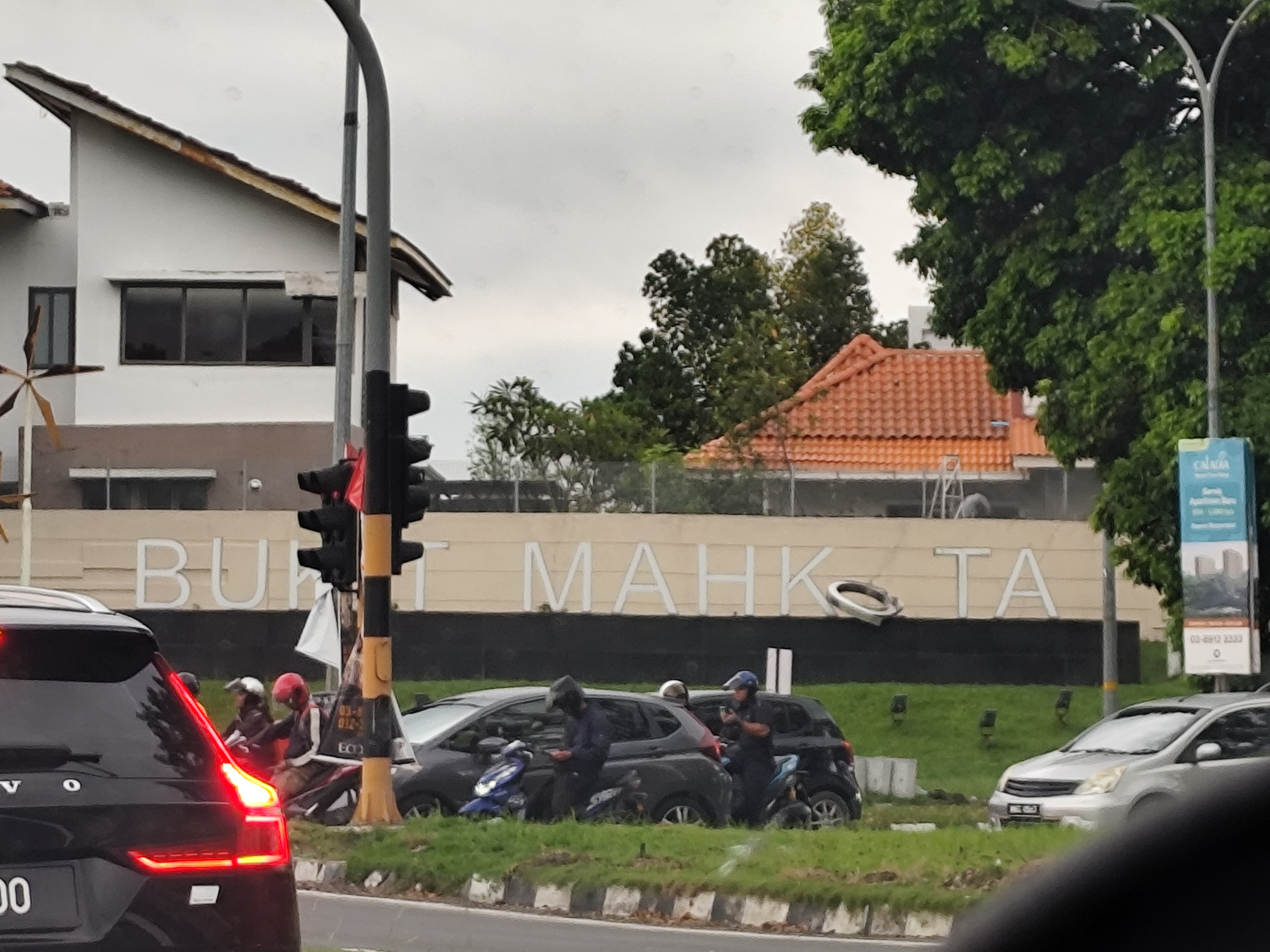
A signage of Bukit Mahkota located in Bangi.

Bandar Bukit Mahkota is a new township in Bangi, Hulu Langat District, Selangor, Malaysia.

Bandar Bukit Mahkota is a 1,320-acre (5.3 km^{2}) development near the border of Selangor and Negeri Sembilan. Nearest to the township are Seri Putra and Bandar Puteri Bangi at the Selangor side and Nilai Industrial Park at the Negeri Sembilan side.

It is close to key tertiary institutions, like University Putra Malaysia, Islamic Science University of Malaysia (Universiti Sains Islam Malaysia), National University of Malaysia (University Kebangsaan Malaysia, UKM), Universiti Tenaga Nasional (UNITEN), Inti International University, Nilai University College, etc.

Soon, Bandar Bukit Mahkota will have its own mosque, namely Masjid At-Taqwa near roundabout to Section 5, and 6. Currently prayers are performed at Surau Ar-Raudhah Section 5 as well as at Masjid Al-Azhar KUIS nearby.

In this township, there are several dining places and cafes.

== Accessibility ==
The township is directly accessible via Putra Mahkota Interchange of the KL-Seremban Expressway and other roads. Four Rapid Bus bus stops are present in the township.
