= Bukit Merah railway station =

Railway station in Malaysia

Bukit Merah

General information
- Location: Bukit Merah, Perak; Malaysia
- Line: West Coast Line
- Platforms: 1 side platform 1 island platform
- Tracks: 3

Construction
- Parking: Available, free.
- Accessible: Y

History
- Opened: 1938–1963
- Closed: 2010
- Electrified: 2015
- Original company: Keretapi Tanah Melayu

Former services
Preceding station	Keretapi Tanah Melayu	Following station
Bagan Serai towards Padang Besar	North–South Line	Pondok Tanjung towards Tanjong Pagar

The Bukit Merah railway station was a Malaysian train station located at and named after the town of Bukit Merah, Perak. It was closed and demolished in 2010 to give way for the construction Ipoh-Padang Besar electrified and double-tracking project.
