= Bukit Gelugor (disambiguation) =

Bukit Gelugor may refer to:

- Bukit Gelugor
- Bukit Gelugor (federal constituency), represented in the Dewan Rakyat
- Bukit Gelugor (state constituency), formerly represented in the Penang State Legislative Assembly (1974–2004), see List of Malaysian State Assembly Representatives (1999–2004)
