= Bukit Kepong (disambiguation) =

Bukit Kepong ('Enclose Hill' in Malay) may refer to:

- Bukit Kepong, mukim in Muar District, Johor, Malaysia.
- Bukit Kepong (film), 1981 Malaysian Malay-language action war film.
- Bukit Kepong (state constituency), state constituency in Johor, Malaysia.

== See also ==
- Bukit Kepong incident
