= Bukit Kepayang =

Bukit Kepayang ('Love Hill' in Indonesian and Malay) may refer to:

- Bukit Kepayang (state constituency), state constituency in Negeri Sembilan, Malaysia.
- SMK Bukit Kepayang, day school in Seremban District, Negeri Sembilan, Malaysia.
