= Bukit Gombak (disambiguation) =

Bukit Gombak ('Hill a bunch or collection of something' in Indonesian and Malay) may refer to:

- Bukit Gombak, subzone of Bukit Batok, Singapore.
- Bukit Gombak MRT station, Mass Rapid Transit (MRT) station on the North South line in Bukit Batok, Singapore.
- Bukit Gombak Single Member Constituency, single member constituency in the western area in Singapore.
- Bukit Gombak Stadium, stadium in Bukit Gombak, Singapore.
