= Jalan Bukit Merah =

Jalan Bukit Merah may refer to:

- Jalan Bukit Merah, Malaysia, a major road in Perak
- Jalan Bukit Merah, Singapore, a major arterial road in Bukit Merah
