= Bukit Indah (disambiguation) =

Bukit Indah ('Beautiful Hill' in Indonesian and Malay) may refer to:

- Bukit Indah, suburb in Iskandar Puteri, Johor Bahru District, Johor, Malaysia.
- Bukit Indah Highway, major highway in Johor Bahru District, Johor, Malaysia.

== See also ==
- ÆON Bukit Indah Shopping Centre, shopping mall in Bukit Indah, Iskandar Puteri, Johor Bahru District, Johor, Malaysia.
