= Bukit Panjang (disambiguation) =

Bukit Panjang ('Long Hill' in Indonesian and Malay) may refer to:

- Bukit Panjang, Planning Area and HDB Town in West Region, Singapore
- Bukit Panjang Bus Interchange, bus interchange serving Bukit Panjang New Town, Singapore
- Bukit Panjang Government High School, co-educational government autonomous secondary school
- Bukit Panjang LRT line, Light rail transit line in Singapore.
- Bukit Panjang MRT/LRT station, MRT and LRT station in Singapore
- Bukit Panjang Primary School, co-educational government primary school
- Bukit Panjang railway station, a railway station on the Singapore-Kranji Railway
- Bukit Panjang Ring Road, ring road located in Bukit Panjang
- Bukit Panjang Single Member Constituency, Single Member Constituency (SMC) located in the western area of Singapore

== See also ==
- Holland–Bukit Panjang Group Representation Constituency, Group Representation Constituency (GRC) in Singapore.
