= Anak Bukit (disambiguation) =

Anak Bukit is an mukim and the royal town of Kedah, Malaysia.

Anak Bukit may also refer to:

- Anak Bukit (state constituency), state constituency in Kedah, Malaysia
- Anak Bukit railway station, Malaysian railway station
