= Star Hill AME Church =

Historic church in Delaware, United States

- U.S. National Register of Historic Places
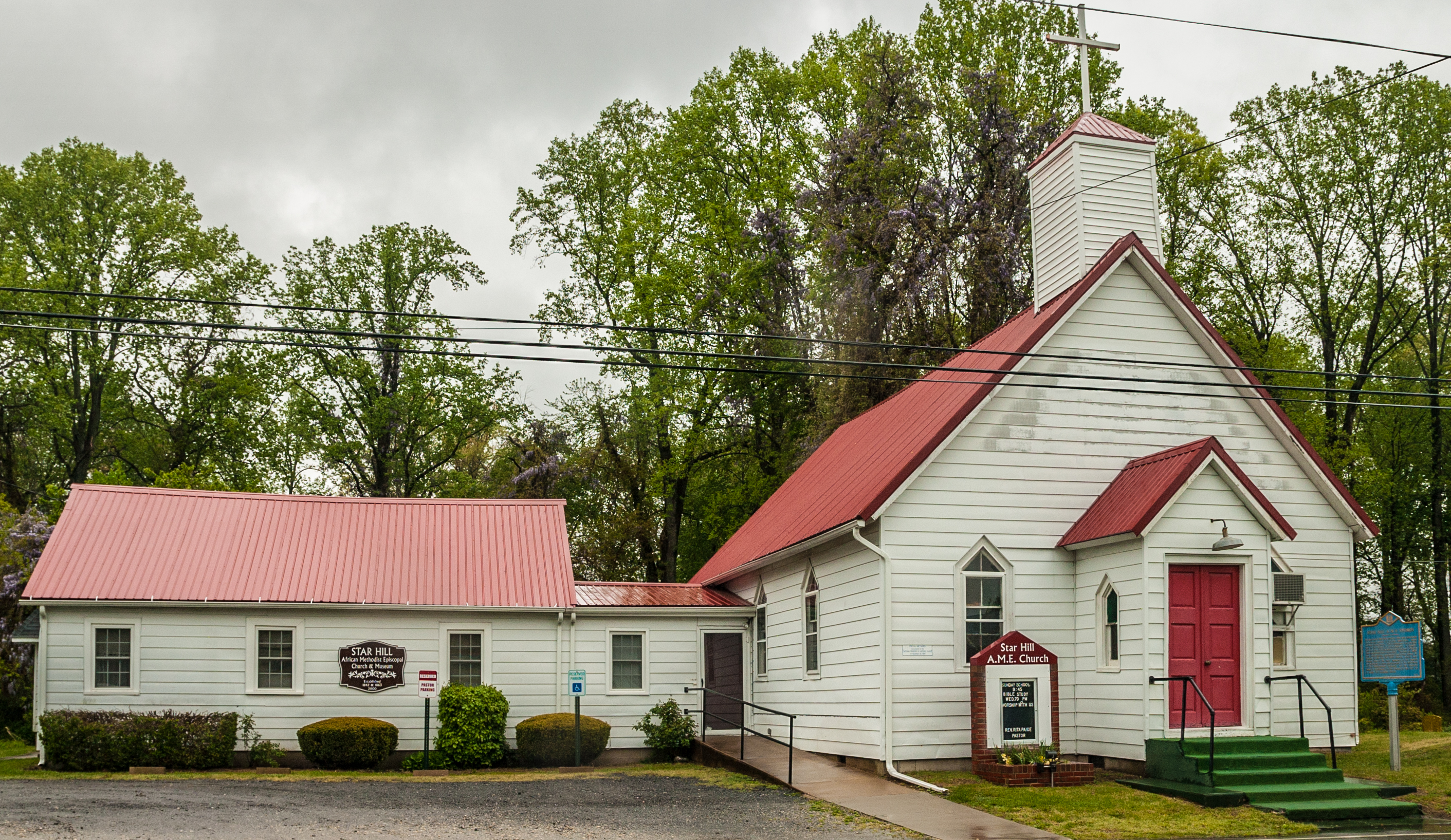
- Star Hill AME Church

- Location within Delaware Location within the United States
- Location: 357 Voshell Mill-Star Hill Road, Camden, Delaware
- Coordinates: 39°6′6″N 75°32′10″W
- Area: 1.6 acres (0.65 ha)
- Built: c. 1866
- Architectural style: Vernacular Gothic Revival
- NRHP reference No.: 94001389
- Added to NRHP: November 25, 1994

Star Hill AME Church, also known as Star of the East Church, is a historic African Methodist Episcopal (AME) church building and cemetery located in Dover, Delaware near Camden, Kent County, Delaware. It was constructed about 1866, and is a one-story, three-bay by three-bay, gable roofed, frame building in a vernacular Gothic Revival-style. It features a small bell tower at the roof ridge. Interments in the adjacent cemetery are believed to begin with the founding of the church in the 1860s, but the earliest marked grave dates from the early 1890s.

The church is an important focal point of the community of Star Hill, an early community of African American settlement in Kent County.

Star Hill AME Church was founded in the 1860s and is a daughter church of nearby Zion African Methodist Episcopal Church.

It was added to the National Register of Historic Places in 1994.

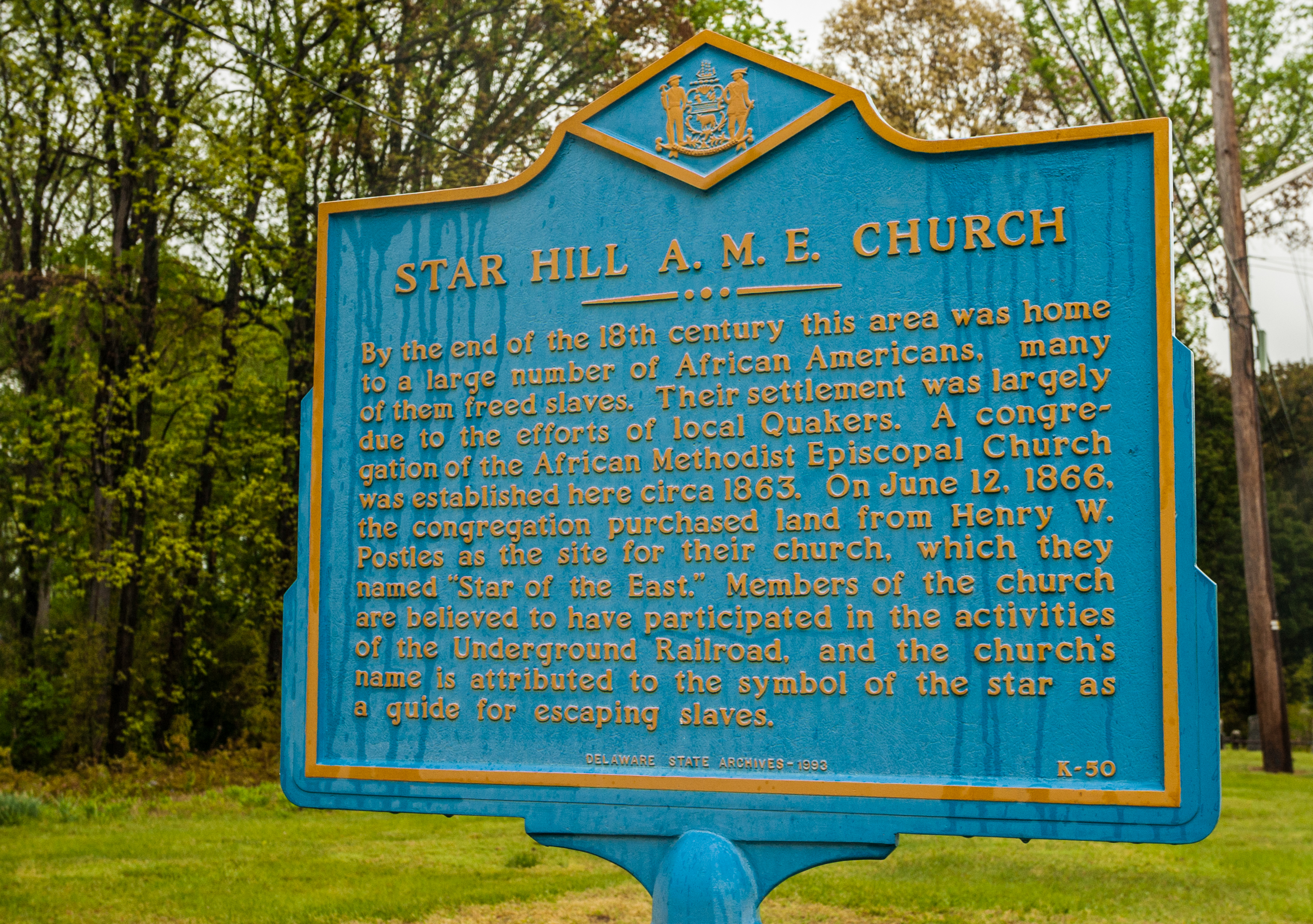
Historical marker at the church

Today the church is home to the Star Hill Museum, which features exhibits about African American history in Kent County, slavery and the Underground Railroad.
