= Bukit Duabelas National Park =

National park in Indonesia

- IUCN category II (national park)
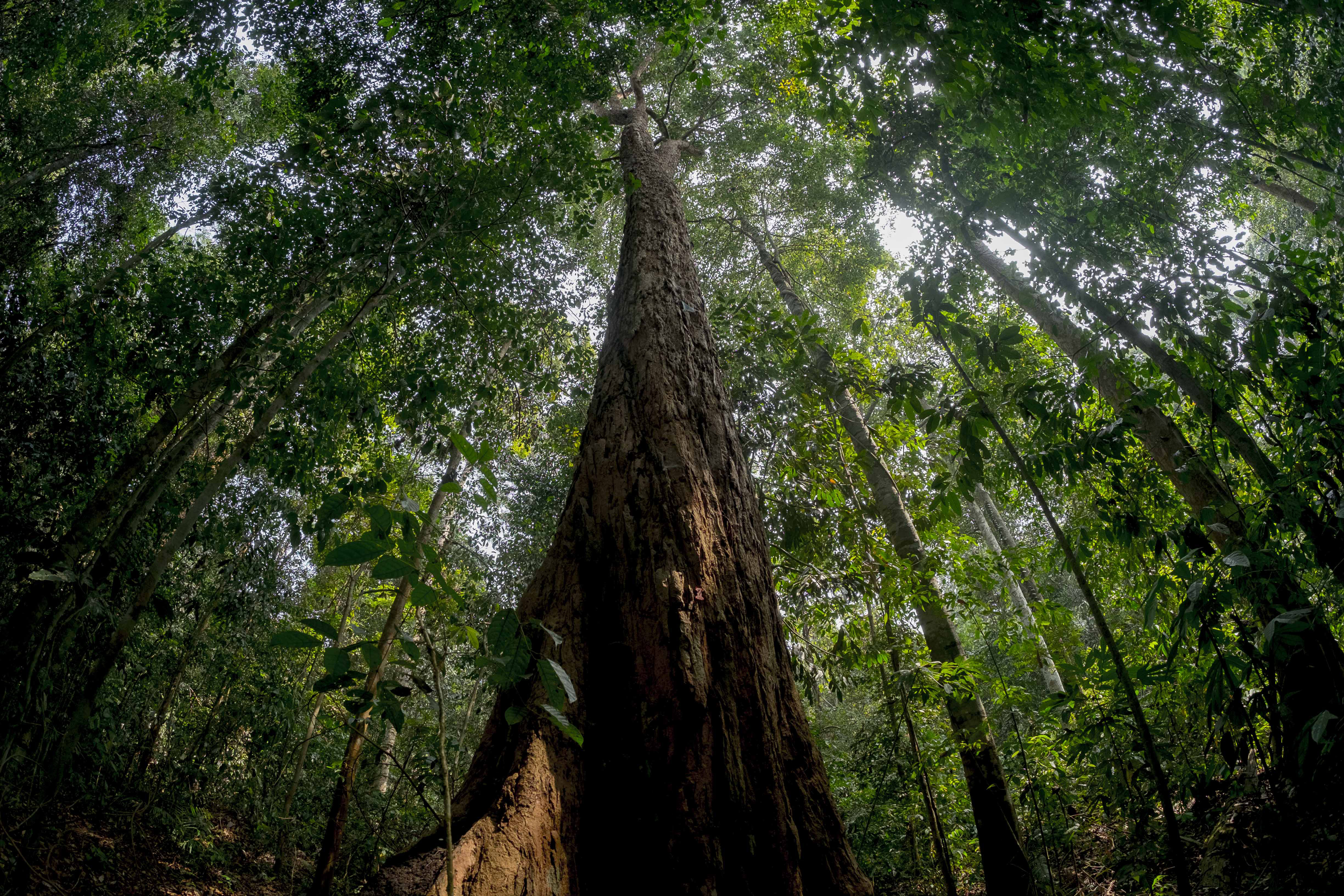
- Bukit Duabelas NP forest

- Location within Sumatra Location within Indonesia
- Location: Sumatra, Indonesia
- Coordinates: 1°51′S 102°52′E
- Area: 605 km^{2} (234 sq mi)
- Established: 2000
- Governing body: Ministry of Forestry

Bukit Duabelas (meaning The Twelve Hills) is a relatively small national park covering 605 km² in Sumatra, Indonesia. It is representative of lowland tropical rainforests in the province of Jambi. Only the northern part of the park consists of primary rainforest, while the rest is secondary forest, as a result of previous logging. The park is inhabited by the indigenous Orang Rimba.

== Geography ==
The national park is named after its hilly landscape, that includes the hills of Punai (164m), Panggang (328m), and Kuran (438m). The area is an important water catchment area for the Batang Hari watershed.

== Flora and fauna ==
Among the 120 plant species in the park, there are Eusideroxylon zwageri rare timber trees, Koompassia excelsa trees that can grow over 80m high, Dyera costulata trees that can have up to 2m diameter, and rattan palms.

Among the endangered animals protected in the park are the siamang, clouded leopard, Java mouse-deer, sun bear, Sumatran muntjac, leopard cat, hairy-nosed otter, dhole, Sumatran striped rabbit, and the crested serpent eagle.

== Human habitation ==
The park is inhabited by the nomadic Orang Rimba ('people of the forest'). Around 40% of Orang Rimba (ca.1,200) live in the Bukit Duabelas National Park, while another 15% live in the neighboring Bukit Tigapuluh National Park and the remaining are dispersed throughout Jambi province. Their empowerment to continue their traditional cultivation, hunting, and gathering is seen as key to the protection of the forest within the national park.

== Conservation and threats ==
Before being declared a national park in 2000, a large part of the area was used as a "production forest", leading to a high rate of primary forest destruction.

The national park is threatened by deforestation, with 70% of its forest cover damaged as of 2012.
