= Bukit Tambun =

- Suburb of Seberang Perai
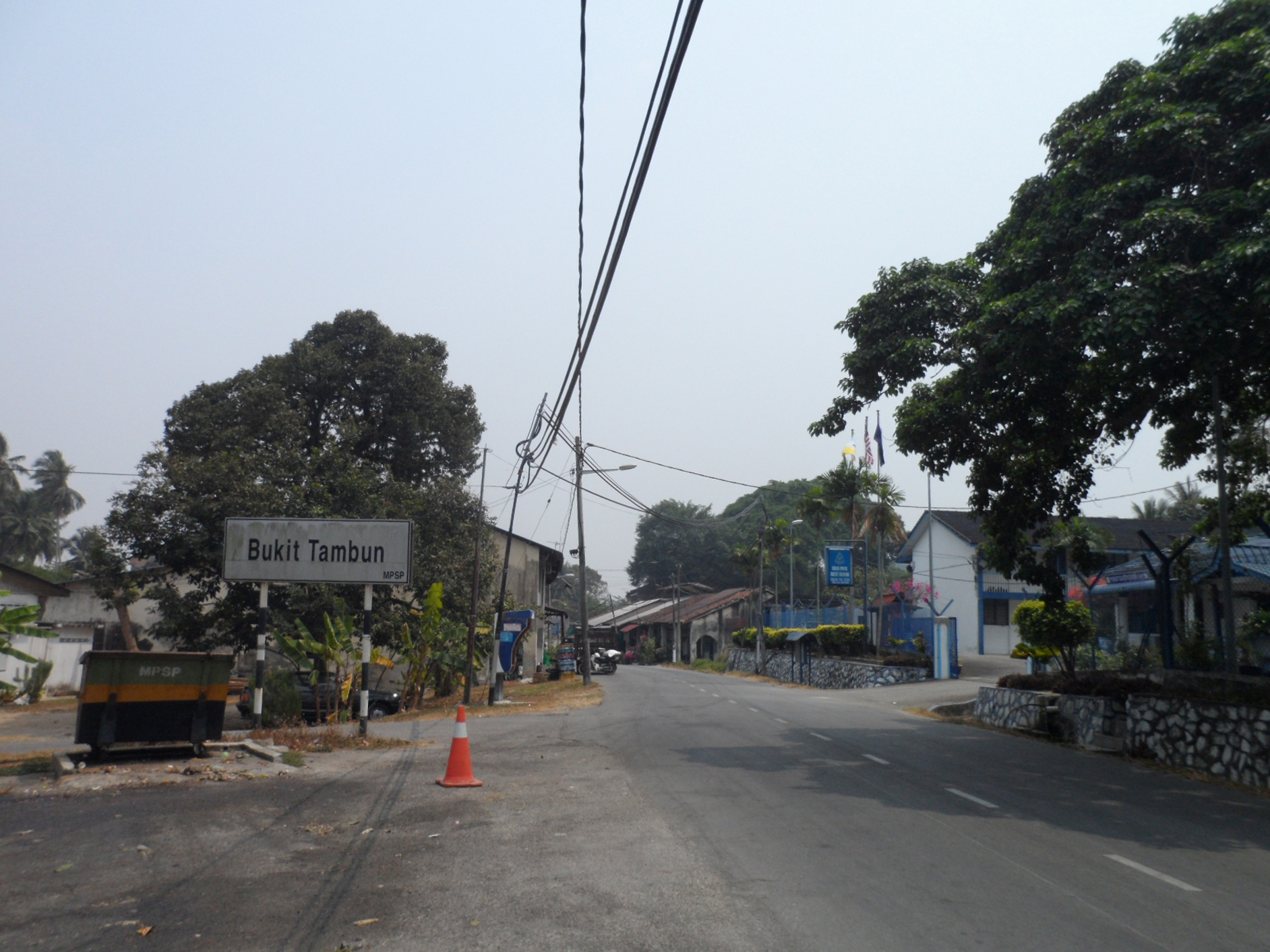
- Interactive map of Bukit Tambun
- Location within Seberang Perai in Penang
- Coordinates: 5°16′21″N 100°27′44″E
- Country: Malaysia
- State: Penang
- City: Seberang Perai
- District: South Seberang Perai

Area
  - Total: 13.9 km^{2} (5.4 sq mi)

Population (2020)
  - Total: 22,990
  - Density: 1,650/km^{2} (4,280/sq mi)

Demographics
  - Ethnic groups: 50.6% Chinese; 23.0% Bumiputera; 22.9% Malay; 0.1% indigenous groups from Sabah and Sarawak; 22.3% Indian; 0.5% Other ethnicities; 3.6% Non-citizens
- Time zone: UTC+8 (MST)
  - Summer (DST): Not observed
- Postal code: 14200

Bukit Tambun is a suburb of Seberang Perai in the Malaysian state of Penang.

== Geography ==
Map of Bukit Tambun.
Click link at the top right corner to zoom in.
1 Batu Kawan Industrial Park 3 (BKIP 3)
2 Simpang Ampat
3 Taman Jentayu
4 Taman Merak
5 Taman Tambun Indah

== Demographics ==
Ethnicities within Bukit Tambun in 2020
Ethnicities / Nationality	Percentage
Chinese	50.6%
Malays	22.9%
Other Bumiputeras	0.1%
Indians	22.3%
Others	0.5%
Non-Malaysians	3.6%

As of 2020, Mukim 14, the subdivision that contains Bukit Tambun, was home to a population of 22,990. Ethnic Chinese comprised more than half of the population, followed by Malays and Indians at 22% each.

== Transportation ==
Bukit Tambun has North-South Expressway (PLUS) exits. It also can be accessed by Sultan Abdul Halim Bridge.
