= Lukan Uking =

Bruneian community leader

Orang Kaya Pekerma Dewa Dato Seri Laila Jasa Lukan Uking DSLJ POAS
- لوكن اوكيڠ
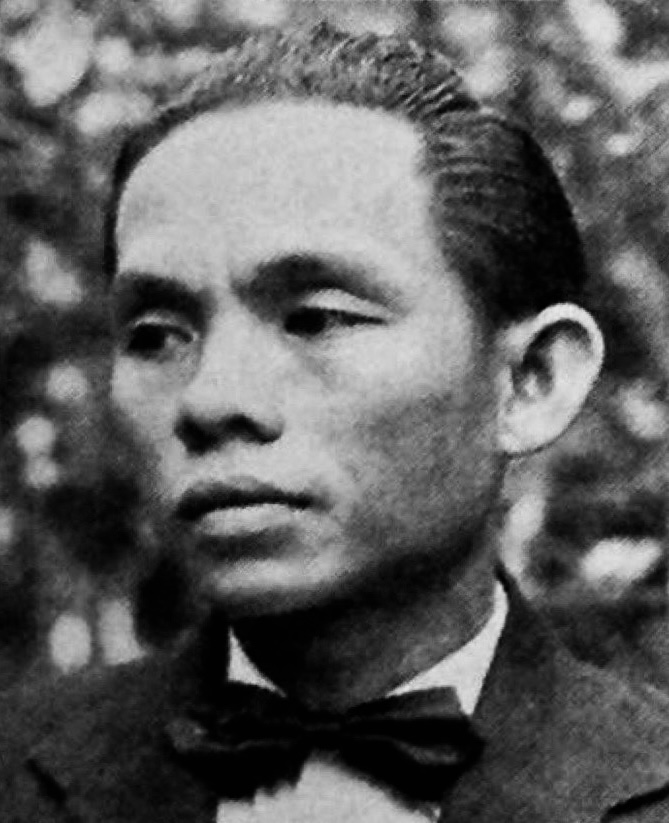
- Lukan in c. 1960
- Occupations: Civil servant; politician
- Known for: Member of the Brunei–Malaysia Commission in 1962 and legislative councillor
- Political party: Independent (1962)
- Relatives: Othman Uking (brother)

Lukan bin Uking was a Bruneian legislative councillor and Dusun leader from Sungai Damit, Tutong District, widely admired for his leadership qualities and contributions. He was among the few Dusun leaders bestowed with a title, which granted him greater authority within the social hierarchy. This incorporation of Brunei Malay practices, including titles and rank consciousness, marked a shift in traditional Dusun leadership, elevating individuals like him to prominent roles. His legacy is mentioned in works by Matussin Tahir (1986) and Harry (2015), the latter noting his role in representing the Dusun community of the interior during political activities in 1962.

== Career ==
Following the Sultan Omar Ali Saifuddien III's address to the Legislative Council on 16 January 1962, a committee was established to gather public opinion on Brunei's potential union with the proposed Federation of Malaysia. Lukan was appointed to the committee as a representative of the Dusun community, alongside other members such as A. M. Azahari, Gimang Anak Perait for the Iban community, Hong Kok Tin for the Chinese community, and Hashim Tahir, who served as secretary. Chaired by Menteri Besar Marsal Maun, the committee reflected the multi-ethnic and political diversity of Brunei's population.

As a member of the Brunei–Malaysia Commission in 1962, he played a pivotal role in ensuring indigenous voices, particularly those of the Dusun people, were heard during discussions on the Malaysia Plan. The commission, chaired by Marsal, conducted public hearings across the state and presented its findings to the sultan by early February 1962. Reflecting on the committee's work, Lukan later noted that the majority of Bruneians strongly opposed the idea of merging with Malaysia, with minimal support observed, particularly in Tutong, where Abdul Manan Mohammad's Brunei National Organisation held significant influence.

In the 1962 Bruneian district council election, Lukan lost the Lamunin seat with 42 votes as an independent candidate. Following the disbandment of the Emergency Executive Council in July 1963, the Legislative and Executive Councils were reinstated, and Lukan served as an unofficial member of the executive council representing Tutong, as well as a Legislative Council member during this transitional phase from July to December 1963. On 14 June 1965, Lukan was appointed as one of four junior ministers under Brunei's government ministerial system. As assistant minister of education, he worked alongside Pengiran Damit Sunggoh, Pengiran Yusof Limbang, and Hong, who were also assigned various responsibilities.

On 19 June 1966, Lukan presided over the opening of the Sungai Kedayan Youth Association's adult education and household management programs at the association's headquarters. In his address, he urged the youth to excel academically and expressed hope that their achievements would inspire young people nationwide. He emphasised the importance of education for all, regardless of age, and encouraged attendees to use what they had learned to improve their lives, particularly in domestic management. He also stressed the necessity of lifelong learning for individual and societal well-being. The event featured speeches from other key government figures, including Salleh Masri and Abdul Aziz Umar, and marked the formal opening of the programs, which had been running since January 1966 and included three adult education courses and one household management course.

Lukan's commitment to education continued with the opening of the Malay school in Kampong Sultan Lama on 9 September 1966. In his speech, he underscored the importance of public cooperation in addressing educational challenges and urged parents and guardians to support their children's academic efforts. He also commended the school committee for its efforts in establishing the school and organising the opening ceremony.

In 1967, Lukan highlighted the Government of Brunei's commitment to education, emphasising the substantial investments made in building schools and institutions. He made this statement during the opening of an educational tool exhibition at the Language and Literature Bureau in Brunei Town, present day Bandar Seri Begawan. Organised by the Brunei Malay Teachers College (MPMB), the exhibition featured teaching aids created by the students. He praised this initiative and encouraged teachers and students to utilise these tools in the classroom. He also acknowledged the role of the Department of Education in advancing education and providing opportunities for students, including the construction of new schools and vocational training institutions.

On 24 February 1967, Lukan was honoured by the Brunei Malay Teachers Association (PGGMB) for being bestowed a noble title by the sultan. The ceremony, which took place at the PGGMB's hall, was attended by approximately five hundred members and distinguished guests, including public authorities and notable individuals. Lukan, along with other education leaders such as the director of education, Malcolm MacInnes, was recognised for his contributions to education. In a speech on behalf of the recipients, Marsal thanked the association for its acknowledgment. On 16 March 1967, Lukan, as deputy minister of education, inaugurated a training program for assistant teachers in Malay schools across Brunei. The ceremony was held in the auditorium of the MPMB and was attended by Othman Bidin, the college principal, and other key education figures. Additionally, on 21 April 1967, he presided over the opening of the Annual Sports Festival for Malay Primary Schools at Padang Besar in Brunei Town.

According to Pelita Brunei, Sultan Hassanal Bolkiah nominated 21 new members to the Legislative Council on 6 February 1971. Lukan was one of the ten people who were personally chosen to take the place of the previous council members whose terms had ended in April 1970. The sultan's attempts to update the council's membership and carry on its governance duties were reflected in the appointments, which included ten appointed persons, five government officials, and six members by virtue of their posts.

Lukan brought attention to important topics during legislative debates during a 1977 legislative council meeting. He endorsed the revisions to bring Brunei's post office up to international standards while debating the Post Office Amendment Act. He highlighted the vital role that the post office plays in communication, comparing it to the importance of the telephone and radio. He voiced his concerns about the growing number of traffic accidents during the discussion of the Traffic (Amendment) Act 1976 and asked for help from the public in following traffic laws in order to increase safety. He also brought up labor policy issues, particularly those pertaining to limitations on foreign workers, to which the administration responded that the Immigration Department handled these matters in compliance with national regulations.

== Titles, styles and honours ==
=== Titles and styles ===
On behalf of Sultan Omar Ali Saifuddien III, Pengiran Anak Safar traveled to Kampong Ukong, Tutong, on 17 October 1960, to formally confer the title of Orang Kaya Pekerma Dewa on Lukan, styled as Yang Berhormat upon being appointed a ministerial position in 1965.

=== Honours ===
Lukan has been awarded the following national honours;

- Order of Paduka Seri Laila Jasa Second Class (DSLJ; 15 July 1979) – Dato Seri Laila Jasa
- Omar Ali Saifuddin Medal (POAS)
