= Kampong Long Mayan =

Long Mayan
- Village
- Kampong Long Mayan
- Location in Brunei
- Coordinates: 4°33′29″N 114°37′57″E
- Country: Brunei
- District: Tutong
- Mukim: Ukong

Government
  - Village head: Muhammad Hafizul Azmee

Area
  - Total: 27 km^{2} (10 sq mi)

Population (2016)
  - Total: 265
  - Density: 9.8/km^{2} (25/sq mi)
- Time zone: UTC+8 (BNT)
- Postcode: TF4747

Kampong Long Mayan (Malay: Kampung Long Mayan) simply known as Long Mayan, is a village in the interior of Tutong District, Brunei, about 40 kilometres (25 mi) from the district town Pekan Tutong. The population was 265 in 2016. It is one of the villages within Mukim Ukong, a mukim subdivision in the district.

== Etymology ==
Brunei has a few place names that are tree related. Another place name in Brunei with a tree-related name is Nong Mayan. Some locals claim that Kampong Nong Mayan is named after a tree called kayu kemayan, although Nong is a Dusun word that refers to the end of the hill or hujung bukit. As a result, the kemayan tree at the top of the hill was the source of the place name Nong Mayan. From the information given by the head of the village, the name Kampong Long Mayan comes from a type of tree that grows between the end of the hill and the stream of the creek which is also known as 'ALONG'. The locals resided in Sanangau prior to Kampong Nong Mayan's establishment. But because of the frequent disruptions from the nomadic Kayan people, the locals decided to go for a safer area. They eventually found what is today known as Nong Mayan.

Si Badang, a well-known individual, protected the locals against Kayan assaults. Ajakulau, a Kayan chief, was famously confronted by Si Badang, who was able to shatter his charm and make the chief run away in terror. Despite their invulnerability, neither of them was slain. The tiny and scattered Sanangau populace resisted the Kayan soldiers despite their bravery, and as a result, their women and belongings were seized. The residents chose to move since they could no longer stand the ongoing dangers, and they eventually settled in a safer neighborhood they called Nong Mayan after the kemayan tree. Yanang, a Yuban descendent, was the first to open and give this new location its name. He had other brothers, including Yulow, who opened Kampong Bukit, Tamada, who founded Kampong Merangking, and Imbun, who founded Kampong Tasik Merimbun. After a school was established there, Kampong Bukit—which was originally called after Yulow—was renamed. According to legend, the Yuban are descended from the Kayangan people.

Furthermore, it is reported that prior to World War II, Kampong Nong Mayan's inhabitants had a close relationship, especially in trade, with Bruneian Malays. 'Belabai,' their commercial centre, was a meeting place for the Bruneian Malays (Abai) and the Dusun people. The Bruneians would kayak for five days and nights from Kuala Tutong to Tasek Merimbun, which is where Belabai is located. They would then trek to Belabai to exchange commodities including rice, rattan, resin, and more.

== Demography ==
As of 2018, Kampong Long Mayan has a population of 319 people; 158 males and 161 females. The village is inhabited by various ethnicities namely Dusun (283 people); Chinese (13 people); Iban (3 people); Malay Brunei (19 people) and Murut (1 person).

== Economy ==
Kampong Long Mayan is famous for its umbut luba product which is one of the main products of 1 Kampung 1 Produk (1K1P) Program. Luba tree planting was pioneered by Awang Satu bin Luin starting in 1988. On 3 December 2010, the Luba Tree Planting Launch Ceremony was attended by 38 families and was officiated by a former Member of the National Assembly, the Honorable Orang Kaya Jaya Putera Dato Paduka Awang Haji Muhd. Taha bin Abdul Rauf with the submission of luba tree seeds to be planted in each participant's house. Umbut luba has its own uniqueness as traditional dish that is not only a favorite of the people of the village and its surroundings but also in other regions of the country. The price in the market is also so encouraging that it is sold at BND5.00 per kilo.

== Infrastructure ==
Kampung Long Mayan receives basic facilities such as paved roads, electricity and clean water supply and telephone service. There is a hall for the convenience of the villagers to hold village meetings and events. According to the Head of Kampung Long Mayan, the hall will be upgraded as in other villages in line with current needs.

Balai Ibadat Hajah Aminah is the village mosque; it was inaugurated on 1 February 1998 by the then Minister of Religious Affairs.

Tamu Muafakat Kampung Long Mayan has been held since 2001. On 3 June 2012 it has a new building that is conducive and provides comfort to the residents of the village doing business. Usually held every Sunday in the first week of every month or subject to circumstances. Among the sales at the guest house are fruits, vegetables, food, local rice and so on. Those who visit are not only those who live in nearby villages but also from other districts who wish to buy village fruits or vegetables.

== Notable people ==
The village's residents were referred to as Orang Kaya Temenggong Lasah and Orang Kaya Temenggong Lasuh by the sultan of Brunei in the past.
