= Othman Uking =

Bruneian civil servant and politician (born 1937)

Orang Kaya Maha Bijaya Othman Uking SNB SMB PJK PKL
- عثمان اوكيڠ

Member of the Legislative Council
- In office 1 June 2011 – 11 February 2015
- In office 6 September 2004 – 15 March 2011
- Monarch: Hassanal Bolkiah

Personal details
- Born: 21 November 1937 Kampong Ukong, Tutong, Brunei
- Died: 24 October 2025
- Spouse: Zainah Bais
- Relations: Lukan Uking (brother)
- Children: Noor Azam
- Education: University of Putra Malaysia
- Occupation: Politician; civil servant

Othman bin Uking (born 21 November 1937) is a Bruneian aristocrat, civil servant and politician who served as a member of the Legislative Council (LegCo) from 2011 to 2015. Additionally, he has served as the head of PESAKA (Keriam Malay Association, Tutong) and advisor to PESATU (New Brotherhood, Tutong).

== Early career ==
After starting at the Ukong Tutong Malay School in 1947, Othman attended the Bukit Bendera Tutong Malay School and Maktab Pertanian, Malaya (University of Putra Malaysia) for his remaining studies. On 1 December 1955, he started working for the government as an Agricultural External Assistant. In 1962, he was assigned as an Election Management Officer for the Rambai and Kampong Benutan regions of Tutong, as well as a Registration Officer for the Brunei Election in the Kampong Bukit area. In 1989, he was designated as a Hajj Transportation Officer, leading a party of 484 pilgrims to Mecca/Medinah. He had previously been appointed as the Head of the Ugama Section, the Virtue Agency at the Brunei Agriculture Department in 1986. In 1992, he announced his retirement.

== Political career ==
Borneo Bulletin formally declared on 31 May 2011, that he will join the Legislative Council. Within the category of persons who have achieved distinction, Othman was re-inaugurated on 1 June after being appointed as a member of the LegCo on 6 September 2004. During his tenure, he took part in multiple ASEAN Inter-Parliamentary Assembly (AIPA) conferences held overseas.

=== Sibut trees ===
According to Othman in 2013, Sibut (Dacryodes patentinervia) trees are located in forest reserves in the Brunei-Muara and Tutong Districts. They take years to develop but yield substantial revenue at 50 cents apiece. According to Minister Yahya Bakar, it is illegal to cut down Sibut trees located in forest reserves. He continued that it is a difficult subject to address (at that LEgCo meeting).

=== Housing program ===
In 2015, Othman inquired about the Islamic Religious Council's housing aid program and the intentions to develop land owned by Baitulmal for the benefit of the impoverished and disadvantaged, or asnaf zakat group. In response, Minister Pengiran Mohammad said that the construction, which is a component of the Prime Minister's Office's "Quick Win" project, will be financed by the zakat collecting proceeds. Furthermore, the council is always working to develop land.

=== Cost of living ===
Speaking at the 12th LegCo Meeting on 20 March 2016, he said that living costs need to be provided to private sector employees, particularly those making B$2,000 or less, in a manner akin to that of public sector officials and staff. This would ease the strain in the face of rising local daily costs for needs like meat and fish while enticing the worker to continue working in the private sector and lowering the nation's unemployment rate.

== Personal life ==
Othman is born in Kampong Ukong, on 21 November 1937. He married Zainah binti Bais, and together they have a son, Noor Azam, one of the first residents to be hired as a faculty member at the UBD English Language and Linguistics Department.

== Awards and honours ==
Othman holds the Manteri Bertauliah title of Orang Kaya Maha Bijaya. Throughout his career, he has earned the following awards and honours:

=== Awards ===
- Warga Berjasa Daerah Tutong (1997)
- Tokoh Saudara Baru Daerah Tutong (2003)
- Anugerah Bakti Hijrah (2004)

=== Honours ===
- Order of Seri Paduka Mahkota Brunei Third Class (SMB)
- Order of Setia Negara Brunei Third Class (SNB; 15 July 2010)
- Order of Setia Negara Brunei Fourth Class (PSB)
- Meritorious Service Medal (PJK)
- Long Service Medal (PKL)
- Sultan of Brunei Silver Jubilee Medal (5 October 1992)
- National Day Silver Jubilee Medal (23 February 2009)
