= 1962 Bruneian district council election =

| 30 August 1962 |

All 55 seats in four district councils 28 seats needed for a majority
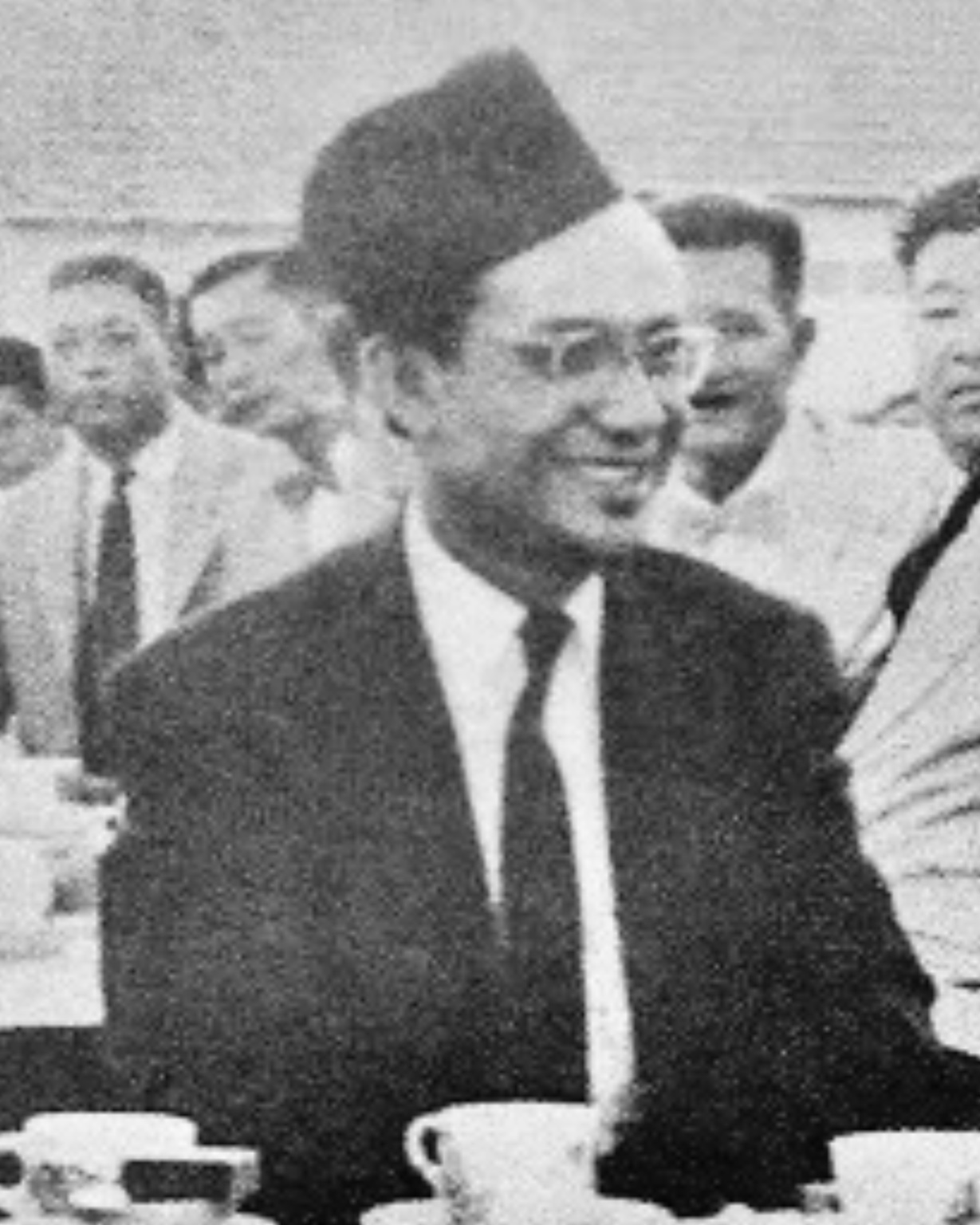

| | Majority party | Minority party |
|---|---|---|
| Leader | A. M. Azahari | Metusin Ali Akbar |
| Party | Brunei People's Party | Independents |
| Seats won | 54 | 1 |

District council elections were held for the first time in Brunei on 30 August 1962. A total of 55 seats on the four district councils were contested by the Brunei People's Party (55 candidates), the Brunei National Organisation (6), the Brunei United Party (1) and eighteen independents. The BPP won 54 seats (32 uncontested), whilst the sole independent elected later joined the party. Voter turnout was around 89%.

The 1959 constitution had created a 33-seat Legislative Council (LegCo), of which 16 were to be indirectly elected by the district councils, nine were to be appointed by the Sultan and eight were ex officio. As all but one of the district council seats were held by BPP members, it was expected that the party would secure all 16 seats. However, the government postponed the opening of the Council and later suspended it after the outbreak of the Brunei Revolt in December.

== Background ==
On 20 June 1962 the government declared that elections would take place on 30 August 1962. There were 55 district council members up for election: 24 for the district council of Brunei (present day Brunei-Muara), 12 for the district council of Belait, 12 for the district council of Tutong, and seven for the district council of Temburong. Only citizens were allowed to vote. A December 1961 Legislative Council (LegCo) law allowed all citizens older than twenty-one to vote.

For each District Council, the elected council members would create an electoral college to choose delegates to the LegCo; eight from Brunei, four from Belait, three from Tutong and one from Temburong. The date of this election was set for 17 September 1962.

== Composition ==
The composition of the 1962 district council election was as follows:

| District | Constituencies | Seats | Ex-officio seats |
|---|---|---|---|
| Brunei | Padang, Sumbiling, Sungai Kedayan, Pemancha–Sultan Lama | 24 | 1 |
| Tutong | Sinaut, Penanjong–Keriam, Pekan Tutong, Bukit Pasir, Kiudang, Lamunin, Kuala Abang, Kupang–Birau, Tanjong Maya, Ukong, Rambai | 12 | — |
| Belait | Sungai Liang, Jalan Seria, Pekan Belait, Balai–Labi, Bukit Sawat | 12 | — |
| Temburong | Labu, Ujong Jalan | 7 | — |
| Total | | 55 | 1 |

== Results ==
To win as many seats as possible, the Parti Rakyat Brunei (PRB) fielded candidates for each of the District Council's fifty-five seats. There were eight candidates from the Brunei National Organisation (BNO), Hasbollah Daud himself from the Brunei United Party (BUP) and seventeen independents. It was obvious that the PRB would win the elections even before the first ballot was cast as thirteen of the twenty-four seats in Brunei, seven of the twelve seats in Belait and five of the seven seats in Temburong had only one PRB candidate, who were elected after being unopposed on Nomination Day, 21 June. This meant the PRB already held control of three of the four district councils, with only Tutong still undecided as all eight seats were contested.

A. M. Azahari vigorously advocated for his party. On 30 August 1962 the results were announced, and the PRB had won all but one of the remaining seats, with Metusin Ali Akbar elected in the Labu constituency in Temburong. However, Akbar subsequently joined the PRB meaning it held all seats on every council and was guaranteed 16 elected members in the LegCo. The government was embarrassed as it was an outright rejection of its strategy to include Brunei in the projected Federation of Malaysia. The overwhelming victory meant that the government was unable to continue to disregard the PRB.

| Party | Seats |
|---|---|
| Brunei People's Party | 54 |
| Brunei National Organisation | 0 |
| Brunei United Party | 0 |
| Independents | 1 |
| Total | 55 |
Source: Nohlen et al.

== Aftermath ==
On his birthday, 23 September 1962, Sultan Omar Ali Saifuddien III announced the selection of members of the Executive Council and LegCo, defying persistent appeals from the PRB for a democratic administration and a change to the constitution. Pengiran Ali, the Head of the Department of Religious Affairs, was appointed to the newly created position of Deputy Menteri Besar, which was established by the Sultan after Dato Marsal's confirmation as the Menteri Besar. One of the Sultan's closest advisors, Pengiran Ali, was appointed to the new position; this may have been done to bolster his government's position in anticipation of the PRB members' admission to the two councils.

Out of the thirty-three members of the LegCo, the PRB held all sixteen unofficial seats. The party also held all six of the fifteen-member Executive Council's unofficial (elected) seats. However, the party was not satisfied since it was still in the minority in both councils even though it had all of the elected seats in both. The Sultan retained absolute authority to select every member of the Executive Council, in contrast to the LegCo, where the PRB selected its own delegates from each of the four districts through an electoral college. Consequently, none of the party's Central Executive Committee members were appointed to the Executive Council apart for Abdul Hapidz, the Deputy President of PRB. Initially, the PRB declined to acknowledge the Sultan's nominations, insisting on having a vote in the appointment process. Azahari, who abstained from the elections, was not appointed and the elected members of his party were not invited to become part of the government of Brunei.

The sultan chaired a meeting of the committee he had formed to look into the terms and circumstances of Brunei's admission into the proposed Malaysia Federation on the day the nominees were made public. Twenty-five people made up the committee, which was established in July 1962. They included the principal local officers and traditional advisers, Dennis White, Joseph S. Gould, Dato Neil Lawson, and a Chinese community representative.

One of the most important times in Brunei's political and constitutional growth was from September to December 1962. Serious ramifications resulted from the dominant PRB wanting a larger say in political decision-making, leading to the Brunei revolt. In addition, Brunei faced pressure to make a decision on its membership in the Malaysia Federation. Because of how it shaped the new nation, the era was a benchmark in Brunei's modern history.
