= Zaini Ahmad =

Bruneian civil servant and writer (born 1935)

- زايني احمد
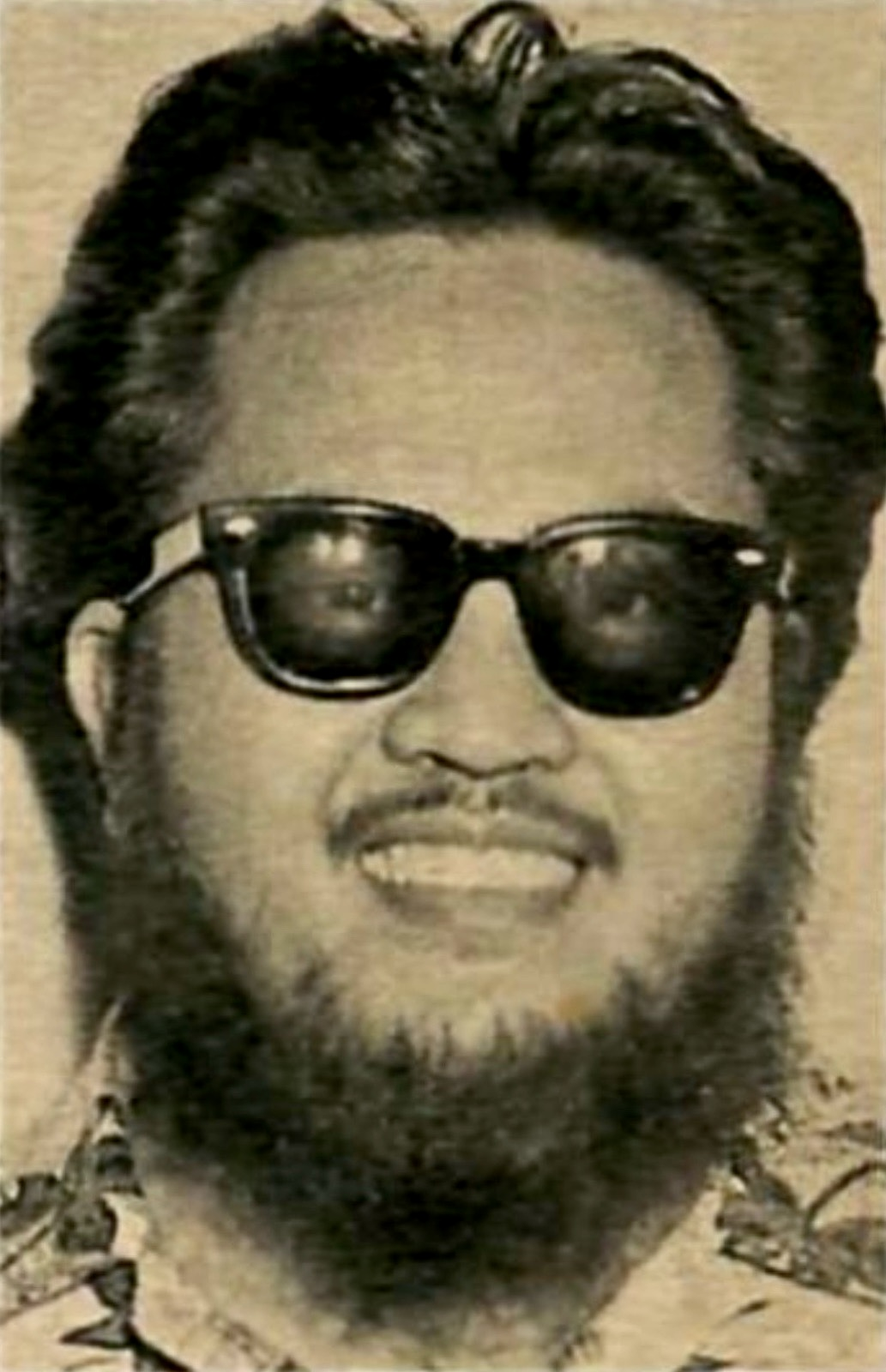
- Zaini, c. 1960
- Born: 21 January 1935 (age 91); Kampong Sumbiling, Brunei Town, Brunei
- Education: Roman Catholic English School; Victoria School; London School of Economics
- Alma mater: National University of Malaysia (MA); University of Malaya (PhD)
- Occupations: Civil servant; writer
- Known for: Vice president of the PRB during the 1962 Brunei revolt
- Political party: BARIP (1940s); PRB (1956–1958; 1961–1976)
- Father: Ahmad Daud
- Criminal information
- Status: Pardoned
- Penalty: Indefinite detention

Zaini bin Haji Ahmad (born 21 January 1935) is a Bruneian civil servant, writer, and nationalist activist who played a significant role in the country's political history. A founding member of the Partai Rakyat Brunei (PRB), Zaini was considered one of A. M. Azahari's closest allies. Following the failed 1962 Brunei revolt, he went into exile, where he dedicated his efforts to reviving the PRB and advocating for political reforms in Brunei. Despite facing restrictions as a political refugee in Malaysia, Zaini continued to influence Brunei’s political landscape by lobbying international organisations, seeking support from bodies such as the United Nations (UN) and the Commonwealth, and presenting his case at various conferences.

== Early life and education ==
Zaini Bin Haji Ahmad was born on 21 January 1935 in Kampong Sumbiling, Brunei Town, now known as Bandar Seri Begawan. His father, Ahmad Daud, was a prominent figure in Brunei, serving as Sultan Omar Ali Saifuddien III's legal advisor and special advisor. Zaini's parents were Sunni Muslims; while his mother was deeply religious, his father only became particularly devout in his later years.

He received his early education at the Roman Catholic English School in Brunei Town, before continuing his studies at Victoria School in Singapore and St. Thomas School in Kuching. During this time, he also contributed to Malaya Raya, a Malay journal edited by Harun Aminurrashid, which was published in Singapore. In the 1940s, following the Japanese occupation, Zaini became actively involved with Barisan Pemuda (BARIP).

For a brief period, he worked with the Brunei government as a clerk at the Immigration Department from 1954 to 1955, before serving as an administrative officer in the Economic Development Unit of the State Secretariat's Office. Zaini then pursued higher education at the London School of Economics (LSE) from 1958 to 1960 on a government scholarship.

== Career ==
=== Early political involvement ===
Zaini's father attempted unsuccessfully to dissuade him from joining the PRB. On 15 August 1956, the PRB was officially registered as a political party, and he became one of its initial Executive Council members, appointed head of the organisation section. From 1956 until February 1958, he served on the PRB's executive committee, during which he edited the party's newsletter, which debuted on 5 January 1957. As a committed member, he observed how Azahari skillfully harnessed public frustration, transforming BRUFICO from a trading company into a mass political movement by organising a public procession. In 1957, Zaini also participated in the PRB's Merdeka Mission to London. However, in 1958, he left the PRB to pursue a course in trade union law in the UK. His departure upset fellow members, who accused him of abandoning his responsibilities in the struggle against the British.

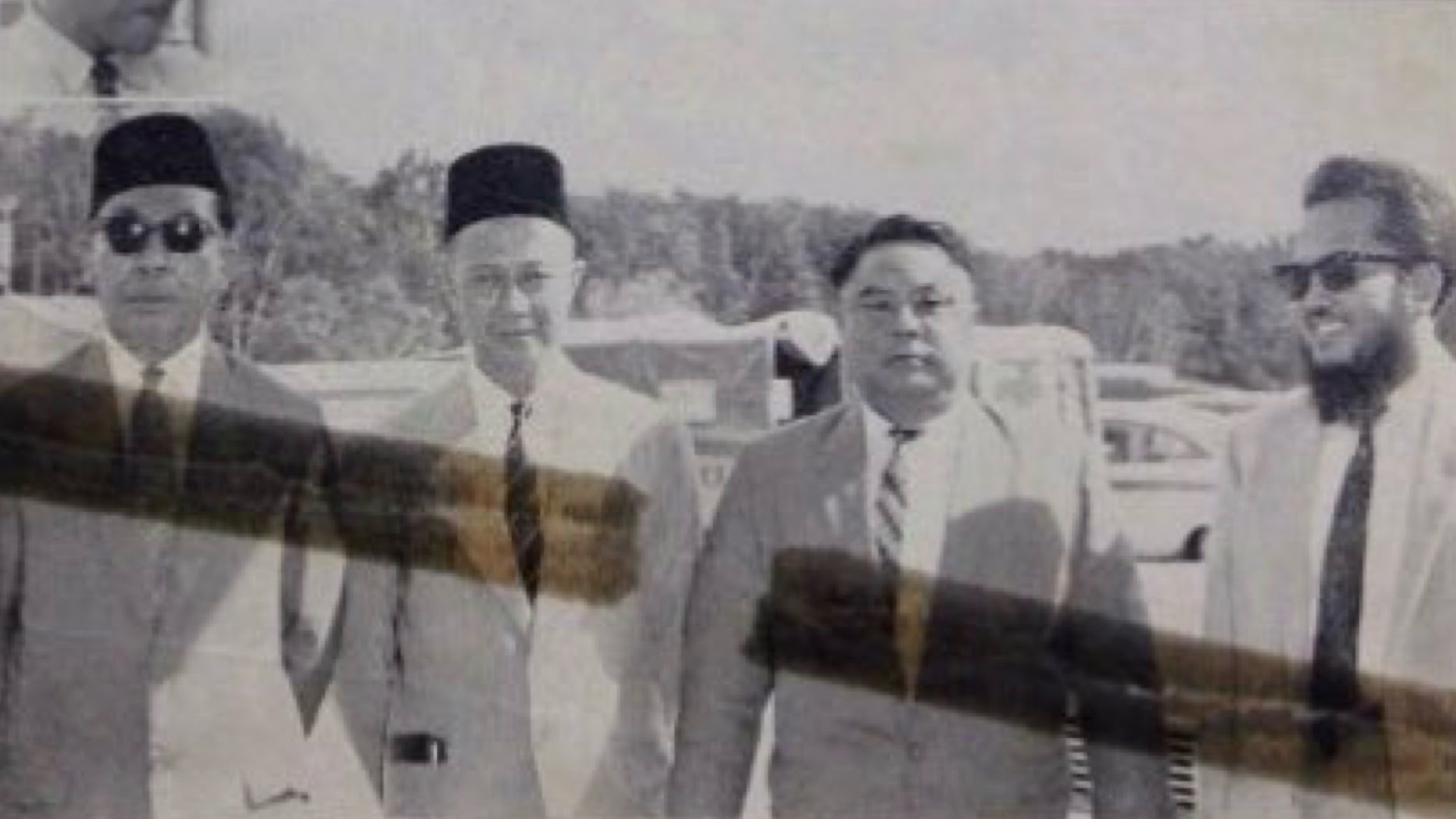
Marsal Maun (second from the left) with representatives from Brunei at the Economic Commission for Asia and the Far East conference in 1961, including Zaini (first from the right)

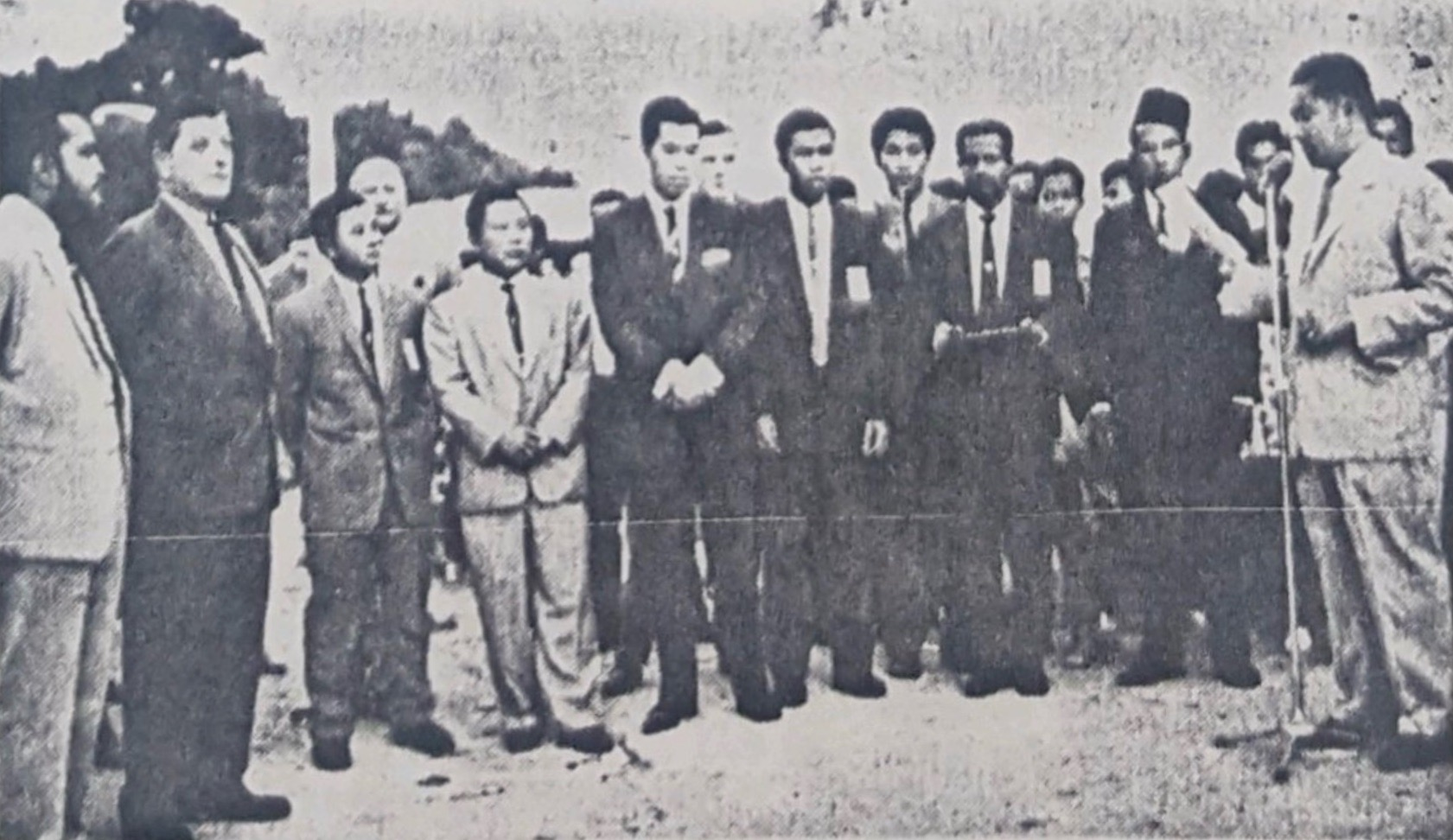
Zaini (first from the left) and Sir Dennis White (second from the left) attending the official opening of the trade market in October 1962

He became an administrative officer at the Labour Office in Kuala Belait from 1960 to 1961. He also started his own weekly newspaper, Suara Bakti, in 1960, but by the end of 1961, the government forced it to cease due to its anti-government stance. In the early 1960s, Zaini, a former member of the PRB, attempted to establish the Brunei United National Organisation as a rival political party. At the time, the Brunei government was open to the formation of new political parties to weaken the influence of the PRB. However, his party failed to gain significant support and was ultimately unsuccessful. He then chose to rejoin the PRB, and in December 1961.

=== 1962 elections and revolt ===
In the 1962 Bruneian district council election, Zaini defeated Hasbollah Daud of the Brunei United Party (BUP) for the Sumbiling seat in the Brunei–Muara District. The BUP, formed under royal patronage in December 1961, aimed to counter the growing influence of the PRB. Hasbollah contested the election but lost by a significant margin, receiving only 25 votes compared to Zaini's 266. As part of the proposed North Borneo Federation, Azahari named him as minister of economics, commerce, and industry. In preparation for the 1962 elections, the PRB adopted a strategy of "anarchy, chaos, and new order," intending to create a power vacuum through violence that would allow a revolutionary group to take control. The PRB also formed an underground army, the North Kalimantan National Army (TNKU), though the plan lacked broader support from neighbouring territories.

It is possible that Azahari was informed by Zaini, who arrived in Singapore from Brunei on 6 December 1962, about the authorities' plans to take action against the PRB leaders. This information may have influenced Azahari's decision to launch the rebellion, which he initiated from Manila the following day. Due to a blunder, the PRB was forced to begin a series of coordinated armed actions two weeks earlier than planned, on 8 December 1962, instead of waiting until Christmas Eve. At the time of the Brunei revolt, he was in Manila as part of the Azahari mission to the headquarters of the UN in New York City, where he was supporting the Malaysia Agreement. It is possible that a meeting involving George Douglas-Hamilton, the sultan, and others leaked information to Zaini, prompting his quick departure from Brunei. This may have convinced Azahari that the rebellion needed to be launched before the authorities could take action against the PRB and the TNKU.

Zaini was involved in planning the revolt, which aimed to capture the Sultan and force him to declare the independence of the Borneo states. Although the Legislative Council meeting was postponed, the revolt went ahead, with he and Azahari already having left for Manila. The revolt began on the night of 7 December, but the sultan was not captured. As soon as the rebellion broke out, the sultan instructed his government to issue arrest warrants for both Azahari and Zaini, accusing them of instigating the revolt in Brunei. The next day, the sultan declared a state of emergency, banned the PRB, and denounced the rebels. During a press conference in Manila on 8 December 1962, Zaini described his narrow escape from Brunei, explaining that he had been tipped off about his imminent arrest for distributing "seditious" propaganda related to the suspension of the Legislative Council session. At the time, he had only "a pair of khaki pants and shirt" with him.

=== Diplomatic tensions and passport issues ===
In December 1962, while disengaging the Filipinos, the British discovered that Azahari was holding a British passport, issued in Singapore in 1961. On 10 December, the British Foreign Office instructed its ambassador in Manila, John Arthur Pilcher, to inform Azahari that his passport had been revoked. The British also requested that the American authorities deny visas for both Azahari and Zaini. However, the American State Department informed the British that their agreement with the UN obliged them to admit Azahari or Zaini if the UN requested it. As part of Azahari's campaign for international support, Zaini was planning to accompany him to the UN on 11 December 1962, with sponsorship from the Philippine government. The Philippine Department of Foreign Affairs had already requested visas for both Azahari and Zaini from the American embassy in Manila.

While in Manila, Azahari had the advantage of a free press, which extensively covered his statements, prompting the British Ambassador to advise London on 11 December 1962 that the sultan needed to take action to counter Azahari's and his statements, particularly their telegram to the UN Secretary-General, U Thant. On 14 December, the sultan, flanked by his advisers, held a press conference, describing the TNKU, surrounding his palace and opening fire on it. His press statement was widely disseminated, but the press in Manila remained sympathetic to Azahari, portraying the rebellion as an uprising for self-determination. Following these developments, the British ambassador in Manila met with Emmanuel Pelaez on 18 December to urge restraint regarding Azahari and Zaini. The Philippine government wanted to remove them, as they were causing trouble and stirring up local politics. While there was a temptation to send them to the UN, the Philippines preferred to have them in Manila rather than Sukarno's Indonesia. Pelaez, however, expressed the need to resolve the issue before the upcoming Association of Southeast Asia meeting in Manila on 11 January, as he wanted to eliminate Azahari and his influence before then.

The TNKU's mistake was leaving the radio station intact. Within six hours of the rebellion's start, the sultan broadcast a message condemning the rebels and calling on the people to remain loyal. He denied supporting the rebellion and labelled it an attempted coup. White believed the rebels had misjudged the sultan's stance. Before the broadcast, Abdul Hapidz and Pengiran Metussin presented the proclamation of independence to the sultan, who refused to meet them and instead directed them to Marsal, who issued arrest warrants for Azahari and Zaini, accusing them of instigating the rebellion.

After the failed revolt attempt, Zaini betrayed his commitment to Azahari and applied for political refuge in British Hong Kong with the British government in 1963, expecting to be treated with mercy. Eventually, he consented to return to Brunei, exposing himself to the sultan's mercy. However, he was sent back to Brunei and imprisoned without charge or trial for over 10 years in Jerudong Prison. Amnesty International (AI), the UN Human Rights Committee, and the Commonwealth Relations Office in London all made unsuccessful attempts to secure his release. His quest for freedom was further rejected when he offered to renounce his Bruneian citizenship in exchange for exile. In 1966, he volunteered to give up his citizenship for exile, and in 1968, he was granted political asylum in Malaysia, though the Bruneian government chose not to respond. By mid-1968, all but 47 of the first 2,000 detainees had been freed. Despite writing to the Sultan in 1964 to pledge allegiance and denounce violence, Zaini remained imprisoned for eleven years. Later, he expressed his willingness to renounce his citizenship and relocate elsewhere, with the International Commission of Jurists, AI, British Members of Parliament, and B. C. Roberts from LSE taking up his case. During his detention, Zaini obtained his chartered accounting certification.

=== Political asylum in Malaysia ===
On 12 July 1973, Zaini, along with seven other detainees including Yassin Affandi, escaped from the Berakas Detention Centre with the help of a Malaysian warder. They fled to Limbang and then to Kuala Lumpur, where they were granted political asylum. This escape led to the revival of the PRB, and the group formed a government in exile, continuing the PRB's activities abroad. The escape strained relations between Brunei and Malaysia, particularly when Zaini was allowed to reactivate the PRB in Malaysia, heightening tensions between the two nations. The operation, led by PRB leader Azahari's relatives, was reportedly supported covertly by Malaysia's minister of foreign affairs, Ghazali Shafie, reflecting Malaysia's dissatisfaction with Brunei's refusal to join the Federation of Malaysia in 1963 and the treatment of Malaysian civil servants in Brunei. Upon their arrival in Malaysia, Zaini and ten others were granted political refuge, and by mid-1974, Zaini had successfully settled in Malaysia.

While in exile in Malaysia, Zaini and other PRB members who had fled with him revived the party and continued their political efforts, advocating for Brunei's independence. He acknowledged Indonesia's direct support and involvement in the revolt, highlighting that Indonesia had long pursued a policy to liberate northern Borneo, viewing the region as part of its rightful sphere of influence. In 1974, despite his restricted travel due to his status as a political refugee and inability to obtain a Malaysian passport, Zaini played an active role in reorganising the PRB alongside Azahari. With Malaysia's backing, they used international organisations to push for Brunei's elections. The PRB reactivated in Kuala Lumpur in May 1974, with the goal of lobbying governments and international bodies to pressure Brunei for political reforms. Zaini presented his case at the Muslim Foreign Ministers' Conference in Kuala Lumpur in 1974, followed by seeking support from the Commonwealth in March 1975 and from the United Nations in March, July, and November 1975.

On 17 January 1976, Zaini announced that he had suspended his support for Azahari. He explained that his decision, effective earlier from 1 December 1975, was due to his growing disillusionment with Azahari's leadership, which he had come to find flawed after 14 months of association. He stated that continuing to support Azahari would be an injustice to himself, unfair to his supporters, and a disservice to the party, though he clarified that he would still remain a member of the party. He also presented his case at the Non-Aligned Movement Summit in July 1976 and sought further UN support in October 1977.

Despite these efforts, the PRB's campaign lost momentum by the early 1980s, partly due to waning international interest and Brunei's eventual independence in 1984. The Malaysian government supported the PRB's revival in Limbang, but protests for Brunei's sovereignty restoration continued. He sought to help Brunei's Ministry of Foreign Affairs post-independence but was deterred by the lack of assurances from Brunei officials and opposition from former Sultan Omar Ali Saifuddien. In 1984, he completed a Master of Arts thesis on Brunei nationalism at the National University of Malaysia, which was published in 1984 and reissued in 1989. He later worked with the Pertubuhan Kebajikan Islam Malaysia, the Muslim Welfare Association of Malaysia, and managing a dormitory for Sabah students in Jalan Ampang.

During an interview in 1985, Zaini maintained hopes of returning to Brunei and securing an ambassadorial role despite the failure of the PRB's efforts. His desire to return home seemed so strong that he was willing to do so without government assurances of safe passage. His connection with businessman Tiny Rowland, who had supported him and the PRB, raised questions about whether Rowland had always understood Zaini's ultimate goal was to return home. As he neared his 56th birthday, the prospect of dying in exile may have reinforced his determination to find a way back to Brunei. After Sultan Omar Ali Saifuddien's death earlier in 1986, he likely saw a clearer path for his return and enrolled at the University of Malaya (UM) in 1988 to work on a dissertation about the PRB's history under Khoo Kay Kim.

As late as 1987, Zaini remained steadfast in his belief that the PRB still held a place in the people's hearts, citing the failure of newly established, government-backed political parties to gain support. Despite his high social standing and early promise of a prestigious civil service career under Sultan Omar Ali Saifuddien, he remained committed to his cause. He saw signs of potential political openings, particularly with the government's rehabilitation of former student activists trained abroad. Zaini believed that the return of his generation was inevitable once the younger returnees were released and envisioned publishing a national history in 1988 that could shape Brunei's political consciousness.

In a 10 January 1991 meeting, Rowland and Edward du Cann were dismayed to learn that the anticipated revolt in Brunei had not materialised despite the large-scale distribution of Lonrho materials. Rowland, who had invested £500,000 in Zaini and Sabah politician Harris Salleh, felt misled about Brunei's political climate and Zaini's dedication to the cause. He remained uncertain about how the funds had been used but found some consolation in the book distribution's success. The meeting also revealed that Zaini, despite his past activism, had expressed a willingness to serve Sultan Hassanal Bolkiah as early as two years before Brunei's independence. He lived in Kuala Lumpur until at least 1992, during which time he submitted his doctoral dissertation.

=== Return to Brunei ===
Zaini returned to Brunei on 1 April 1993 without any assurances of safety and was immediately detained for three years before receiving a royal pardon on 19 July 1996. (Note: Another source mentioned that after spending more than two years in detention, he was released on 19 July 1996 following a pardon from the sultan.) His release, which coincided with the sultan's fiftieth birthday, was quietly handled, with only a brief report in Pelita Brunei on 24 July 1996 detailing his apology and oath of loyalty. In December 1997, he suffered a stroke, but after his recovery, he lived a peaceful retirement in Bandar Seri Begawan with his oldest son and family, working at the Brunei History Centre (PSB) to prepare his PhD thesis for publication. His later employment at the PSB could be seen as an implicit acknowledgment of defeat, both in 1962 and 1990. Ironically, the Lonrho-funded attempt at opposition only reinforced the monarchy's power by demonstrating the futility of resistance. Rowland's main success was securing the release of six detainees through Margaret Thatcher's intervention, sparing the sultan from international embarrassment. The Brunei government's later rehabilitation of former opposition figures, including Affandi and Prince Jefri Bolkiah, further underscored its confidence in maintaining political control.

In 2001, he received his PhD from UM, and two years later, his doctoral thesis, Brunei Merdeka: Budaya dan Sejarah Politik, was published. Zaini was last seen in 2008 after presenting his updated thesis, Brunei Merdeka: Budaya dan Sejarah Politik, which was certified by Brunei's Special Branch, providing him with a small pension.

== Literacy career ==
Zaini is recognised as a significant contributor to the history of Brunei, with his work forming part of a broader collection of publications on the country's history. While major works by Graham Saunders, Ranjit Singh, and A. V. M. Horton offer useful overviews of Brunei's development, Zaini's contributions, alongside those of Jamil Al-Sufri, deepen the understanding of Brunei's political, social, and constitutional history, particularly during the pivotal period between 1944 and 1962. His Pertumbuhan Nasionalisme provides an insider's perspective on the PRB, offering a readable account of the nationalist movement.

In January 1990, Isa Ibrahim, the then minister of home affairs, issued an order prohibiting the importation, sale, or distribution of two of Zaini's works, Pertumbuhan Nationalisme Di Brunei (1939–1962) and Triwarna. This official ban was announced in Pelita Brunei on 3 January. Shortly thereafter, on 9 January, a report of his press conference, in which he called for the release of all remaining detainees, was censored from copies of the Straits Times entering Brunei.

His other notable works include:

- Zaini Haji Ahmad (1978). Rakis: Suatu Testemen Anotasi dan Analisa (in Malay). Kuala Lumpur: Trading Oriental Plaza.
- Haji Zaini Haji Ahmad (1984). Brunei Kearah Kemerdekaan 1984 (in Malay). Selangor.
- Zaini bin Ahmad (1986). Triwarna (in Malay). Kuala Lumpur: Heinemann (Malaysia).
- Haji Zaini Haji Ahmad (1987). Partai Rakyat Brunei: Selected Documents (in Malay). Petaling Jaya: INSAN.
- Pertumbuhan Nasionalisme di Brunei (1939–1962) (in Malay). Selangor: ZR Publications. 1989.
- Haji Zaini Haji Ahmad (2003). Brunei Merdeka: Sejarah dan Budaya Politik Brunei (in Malay). Bandar Seri Begawan: De'Imas Printing.
