= Hasbollah Daud =

Bruneian politician (born 1902)

- حسب الله داود
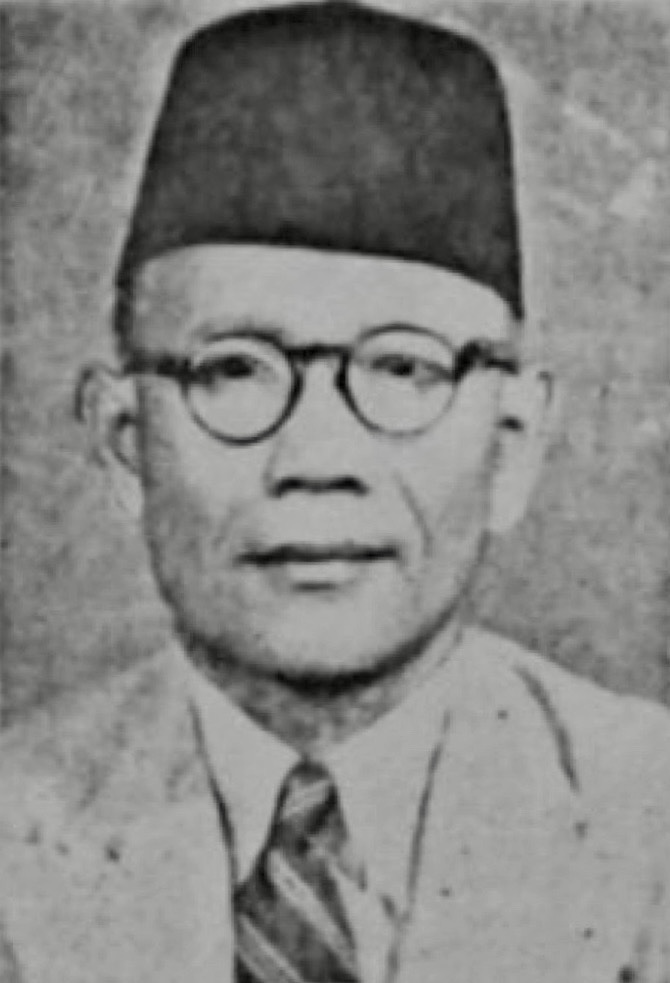
- Hasbollah, c. 1962
- Born: 1902; Kampong Sumbiling, Brunei Town, Brunei
- Education: Victoria Institution; Victoria School
- Occupations: Politician; businessman
- Known for: Founder of Brunei United Party
- Political party: BUP (1961–1962)

Hasbollah bin Haji Mohammed Daud (Note: In 1962, the Bruneian publication Pelita Brunei spelled his name as Haji Hasbullah bin Haji Mohamed Daud.) (born 1902) was a prominent Bruneian businessman and politician who founded the Brunei United Party (BUP) in 1961 to promote Brunei's integration into the Malaysian Federation. Supported by the monarchy, he established the party as a counter to the growing influence of the Parti Rakyat Brunei (PRB), but his political efforts were unsuccessful, including losing the 1962 election for the Sumbiling seat.

== Early life and education ==
Hasbollah bin Haji Mohammed Daud was born in 1902 in the village of Kampong Sumbiling, Brunei Town. He received his education at Victoria Institution in Kuala Lumpur, Malaya, and also attended Victoria School in Singapore before returning to Brunei to begin his career. Around 1911, his father, a rubber planter from Johore, was brought to Brunei by a European rubber estate manager, marking the family's relocation to the country. Datin Paduka Hajah Norsiah, his sister, served as the Ministry of Education's acting permanent secretary in 2002.

== Political career ==
He worked as a clerk in the British Resident's Office from 1913 to 1923. The British Military Administration detained him together with Salleh Masri and a number of other Malays for their involvement in the Malay-Chinese clash in March 1946. For this reason, he departed from the civil service was a disciplinary charge. He visited several locations in Sarawak, Singapore, and Malaysia. He was also a well-known member of the Persatuan Sahabat Pena Brunei (PSPB) in the 1930s and 1940s.

Hasbollah founded the BUP in September 1961 at Kampong Sumbiling, registered in December, with a pro-Malaysian stance aimed at promoting the Malaysia Plan to Bruneians and in favour of Brunei's integration with the Malaysian Federation. (Note: The BUP was formed to capitalise on the delay of the 1961 elections, with limited support at its inception. Its manifesto outlined several key goals, including striving for an independent and sovereign Brunei, improving the welfare of the Malay people, promoting and safeguarding Islam and Malay customs, protecting the status of the ruler, and advocating for a responsible parliament to uphold democratic principles. Additionally, it stressed the importance of religious freedom, free speech, minority rights, and international cooperation to foster a just and humane global community.) The party was established with royal support as a counterforce to the rising influence of the PRB. Despite his efforts, Hasbollah and the BUP struggled in the elections of 1962 and 1965. (Note: The BUP achieved success, but it was unable to divert much support from the PRB due to its unwavering backing of the majority of government initiatives.) In 1962, the party fielded just one candidate—Hasbollah himself—and lost against PRB's Zaini Ahmad for the Sumbiling seat in Brunei–Muara. He only managed to receive 25 votes, while Zaini received 266. PRB's dominance was solidified as they took control of most district councils, leaving BUP without significant influence.

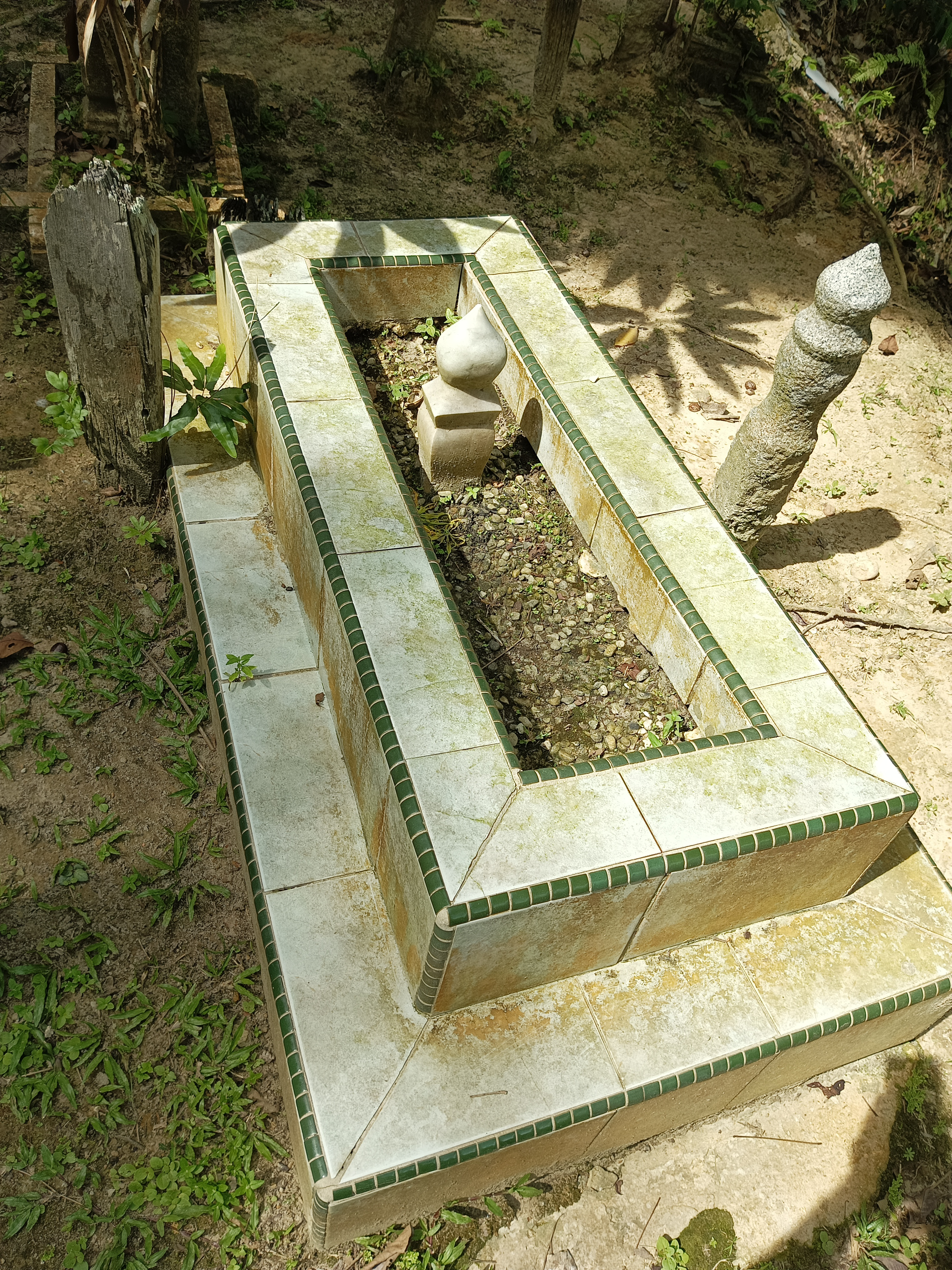
Grave of Hasbollah Daud at Rangas Muslim Cemetery

On a research mission to Malaysia in 1962, BUP President Hasbollah caused a stir when he said that most Bruneians were more concerned with making money than with learning about Malaysia's prospective advantages. Only a small percentage of Bruneians followed regional political developments. In response, the PRB stated that numerous Bruneians had publicly opposed Malaysia in front of the Brunei–Malaysia Commission, proving that a lack of faith in Hasbollah did not translate to political apathy.

== Things named after him ==
- Bangunan Hasbullah 1, 2, 3 and 4 are buildings located in Gadong.
