= Mukim Rambai =

Mukim of Brunei

- Mukim
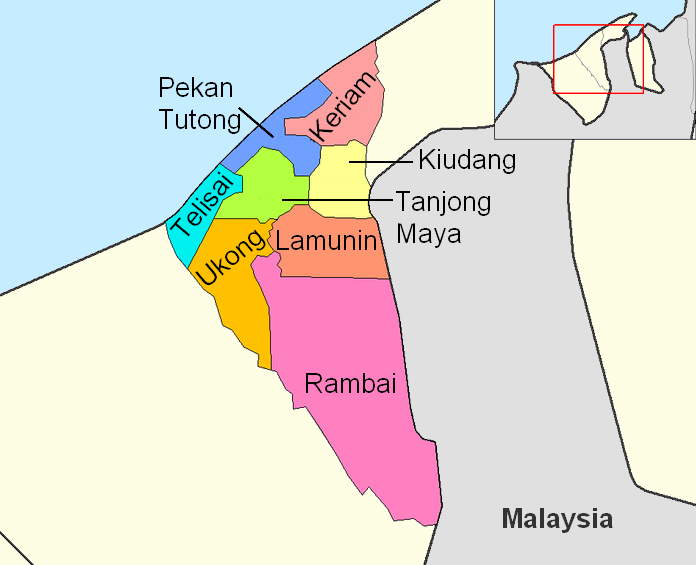
- Rambai is in pink.
- Coordinates: 4°38′15″N 114°39′02″E
- Country: Brunei
- District: Tutong

Government
  - Penghulu: Dahalan Kaslan (Acting)

Area
  - Total: 515.5 km^{2} (199.0 sq mi)

Population (2021)
  - Total: 980
  - Density: 1.9/km^{2} (4.9/sq mi)
- Time zone: UTC+8 (BNT)
- Postcode: THxx49

Mukim Rambai is a mukim in Tutong District, Brunei. The population was 1,404 in 2016.

== Etymology ==
It is said that there is an area where traders stop and gather to buy and sell goods in exchange for goods such as salt, copper goods with forest products, agriculture and the like from people in the interior. This settlement is one of the stopping places called 'empat betamu for business before heading to other villages along this river including villages close to tributaries whose mouths flow into the Tutong River. In the area where the betamu is held, there is a fruit tree called Pohon rambai which since the beginning has grown in the depths near the bank of the river.

The tree had sunk in a sitting position, that is, the whole tree went into the river. Some say that the tree appears on the surface of the water when the moon is full. When this tree emerges from the surface of the water, the tree is filled with flowers and according to the story there is a fish called ikan dalak (haruan) the size of a bushel, which has scales in the form of beads around it between his head and body playing while swimming around the tree. With the story of Pokok Rambai, the local residents at that time named this village in conjunction with the name of the tree, which is Kampong Rambai. The scene of the incident has been eroded due to the river's headland breaking off and being eroded by river water and climate change from time to time.

== Geography ==
The mukim is located in the southern part of Tutong District, bordering Mukim Lamunin to the north, the Malaysian state of Sarawak to the east and south, Mukim Sukang and Mukim Bukit Sawat in Belait District to the south-west and west respectively, and Mukim Ukong to the north-west.

== History ==
Around 1800 there was a group of people in this country led by Commander Engam who explored a settlement on the banks of the Tutong River. The distance is approximately 36 kilometers from Pekan Tutong to the headwaters of this river. In the past, before there was progress in the interior of this area, the river was a very important link. The river is not only a source of daily needs, agriculture, fishery, but it is also the main link for boat transport between traders and people who live along the Tutong River. There is also a road (footpath) for daily business and business.

== Demographics ==
As of 2016 census, the population was 1,404 with 52.4% males and 47.6% females. The mukim had 250 households occupying 248 dwellings. The entire population lived in rural areas.

== Administration ==
As of 2021, the mukim comprised the following villages:

Settlements	Population (2021)	Ketua kampung (2024)
Kampong Rambai	469	Mohammad Dahalan bin Kaslan
Kampong Merimbun	105	Sani bin Nangkat
Kampong Benutan	133	Haji Muhammad Hairol Mazlan bin Haji Abd Razak
Kampong Kuala Ungar	271	—N/a
Kampong Supon Besar	1	—N/a
Kampong Lalipo	1	—N/a
Kampong Bedawan	0	—N/a
Kampong Belabau	0	—N/a
Bukit Ladan Forest Reserve	0	—N/a

== Villages ==
=== Kampong Rambai ===
This village is located in the countryside, which is about an hour's drive from Pekan Tutong, the villagers and its surroundings can enjoy the basic facilities provided by the Government of Brunei such as schools, paved roads, telephones and electricity. Some of the residents of this village also receive assistance from the government through the Department of Community Development, Ministry of Culture, Youth and Sports, namely old age pension, blind allowance, disability allowance and others. The residents of this village partly work with the government and the private sector and are not exempted from working on their own to cover their daily living. For those who are self-employed, most residents raise animals such as broiler chickens, village chickens, buffaloes, cows and goats. Some livestock products are also sold privately. Not least some residents are active in fruit gardening and planting agarwood trees around their homes.

=== Kampong Supon Besar ===
Kampong Supon Besar is located far away in Ulu Tutong (Inner Tutong) with an estimated population of 200 people. The population is the same as any other inland villages by traveling by land unlike before using the river. Other facilities that have been provided before is the 'air doctor' service that visits the village once a month for the purpose of providing treatment to ensure their health is guaranteed. The Program Komunikasi Bersemuka is carried out continuously in which by going around the mukim and the village, the Information Department had visited the Kebubok Longhouse, and was welcomed by the Head of the Kampong Supon Besar Longhouse, Awang Ali Bujang bin Abdullah Sigat on 11 September 2013, where the officers from the Information Department can meet face-to-face and dialogue with grassroots leaders and residents of mukim and villages living in rural areas. Through this kind of program can give the villagers the opportunity to voice their problems and opinions, in addition to receiving the latest information about the government.

== Infrastructure ==
=== Education ===
The local primary schools include Rambai Primary School and Benutan Primary School. Each school also houses a sekolah ugama, school for the country's Islamic religious primary education.

=== Places of interest ===
The following places are located within the mukim's administrative boundaries:

- Kampong Benutan Mosque is the sole mosque in the mukim. It was built in 1996 and can accommodate 200 worshippers.
- Tasek Merimbun, the largest natural lake in the country
- Benutan Dam
- Ulu Tutong Dam

== Notable people ==
- Azman Ilham Noor (born 1984), national footballer
