= Ulu Tutong Dam =

Ulu Tutong Golden Jubilee Dam
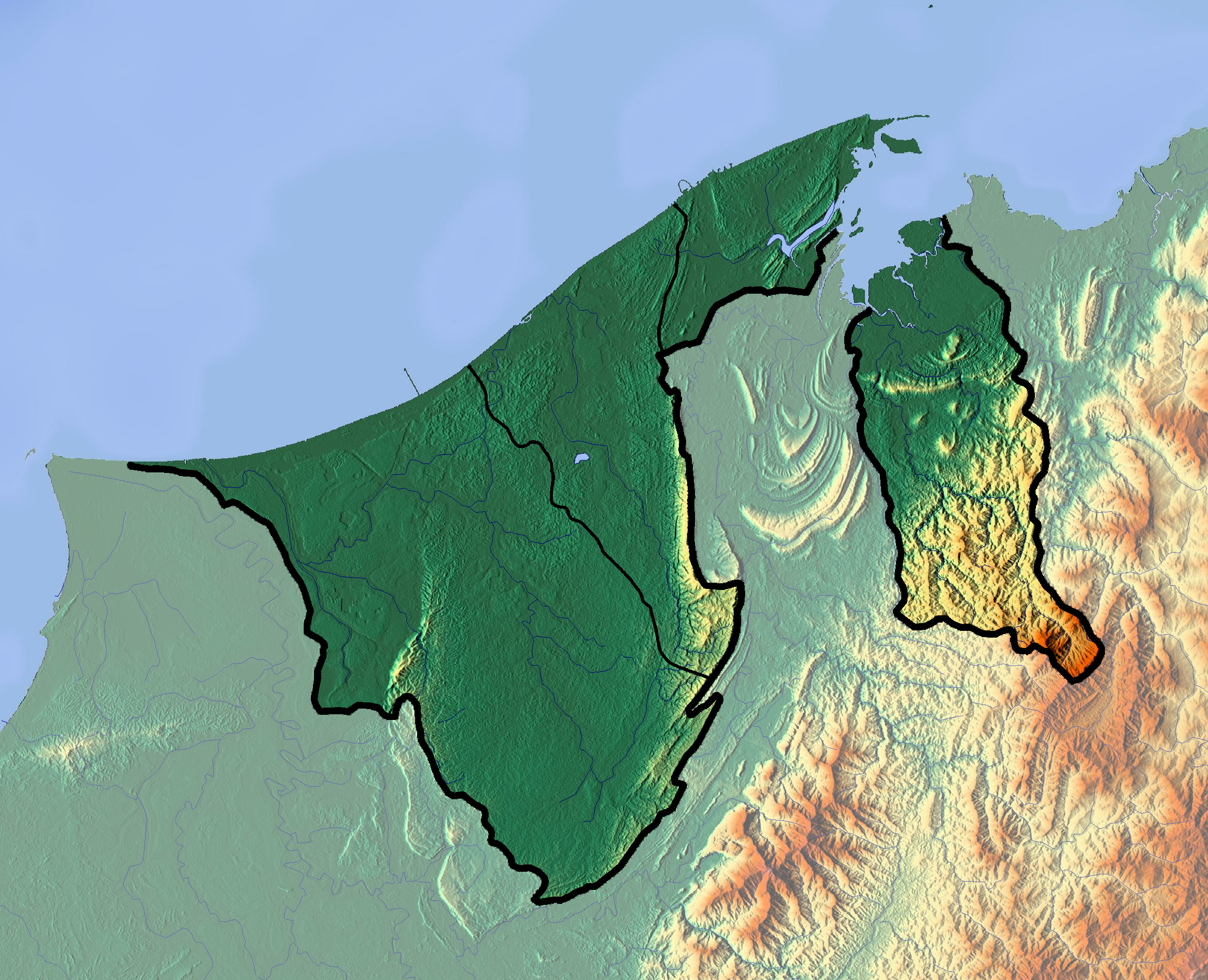
- Location within Brunei
- Country: Brunei
- Location: Tutong District
- Coordinates: 4°24′27.14″N 114°48′28.00″E
- Purpose: Water supply
- Status: Operational
- Construction began: 2010
- Opening date: June 2017
- Construction cost: US$85.5 million
- Owner: Public Works Department of Brunei

Dam and spillways
- Type of dam: Embankment, earth and rock-fill
- Impounds: Sungai Tutong River
- Height: 44 m (144 ft)

Reservoir
- Total capacity: 100,000,000 m^{3} (81,000 acre⋅ft)
- Catchment area: 108 m (354 ft)

The Ulu Tutong Dam is an embankment dam on the Sungai Tutong River in Tutong District, Brunei. The primary purpose of the dam is to increase water supply in Tutong and Brunei-Muara Districts by as much as 156,000,000 m^{3} (126,000 acre⋅ft) annually. It has a normal reservoir volume of 100,000,000 m^{3} (81,000 acre⋅ft), making it the largest water supply project in the country. In February 2010 Sinohydro won the bid to construct the US$63 million project and construction began soon thereafter. It was originally expected to be complete in February 2014 but the date was pushed to February 2015 due to difficulties at the construction site. It was eventually fully completed in February 2017. In July 2018, it was officially renamed Ulu Tutong Golden Jubilee Dam by Sultan Hassanal Bolkiah. The dam is owned by the Public Works Department of Brunei.

== See also ==
- Benutan Dam
