= Mukim Lamunin =

Mukim of Brunei

- Mukim
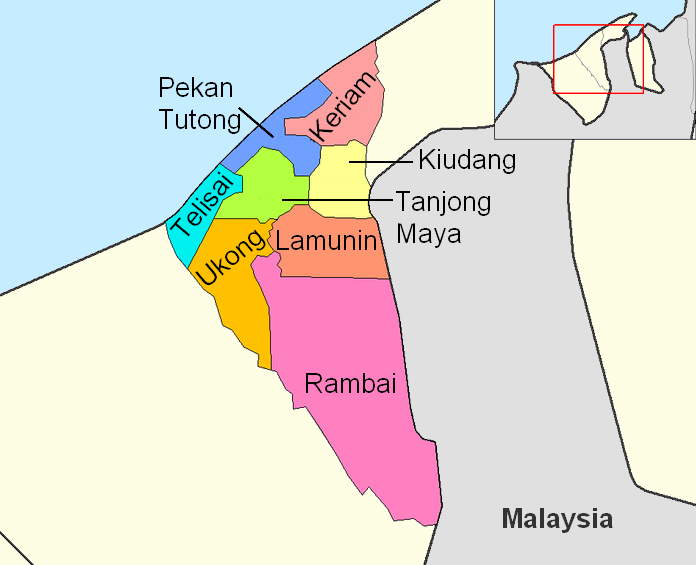
- Lamunin is in peach.
- Coordinates: 4°41′22″N 114°40′39″E
- Country: Brunei
- District: Tutong

Government
  - Penghulu: Jaafar Tinggal

Population (2021)
  - Total: 3,641
- Time zone: UTC+8 (BNT)
- Postcode: TGxx43

Mukim Lamunin is a mukim in Tutong District, Brunei. The population was 4,298 in 2016.

== Etymology ==
In Kampong Lamunin, there is a folk tale regarding the origin of Bukit Munin, located at Simpang 1603. The hill is 100 metres (330 ft) above sea level and covers about 300 square metres (3,200 sq ft). According to the former village head of Lamunin in 2010, Bukit Munin is the origin of the name Kampong Lamunin. This origin story is unique because the characters involved belong to three native Brunei ethnic groups: the Kedayan, Tutong, and Dusun. The combination of these three groups is also symbolic of the Tugu Tiga Gong, a monument built by the villagers in 1992 to celebrate the silver jubilee of Sultan Hassanal Bolkiah's reign. This monument, located in front of the Balai Raya Kampong Lamunin, has become a landmark of the village.

The story of Bukit Munin dates back to a time when there was a neglected area of swampy land with a small stream and a hill. The land was overgrown with roots and vegetation, and the villagers called it "Lalak Akar." The village head decided to organise a communal work event to clear the land and transform it into a fruit orchard. One villager, Liau Gundah, from the Dusun ethnic group, was eager to participate. On his way home, Liau Gundah stopped by the "Lalak Akar" area to examine the overgrown land and recognised various types of roots like Akar Kaboh, Akar Kait, and others, which he thought could be useful for traditional medicine.

On the day of the event, Liau Gundah, with food prepared by his wife, joined the villagers in clearing the area. While others cut grass, trees, and gathered twigs, Liau Gundah worked at his own pace, occasionally resting. After some rest, he decided to climb the hill, despite warnings from his friends about the dangerous conditions. As he ascended, he swung his machete to clear the way and was startled when an animal appeared, causing him to shout "Munin! Munin!" and chase after it. The villagers tried to stop him, but Liau Gundah, in his startled state, continued chasing the animal up the hill. He eventually caught it and, still in his startled state, killed it. Once he recovered from the episode, he felt regret but was reassured by the villagers that his actions were due to his condition. The villagers then named the hill Bukit Munin, with "munin" meaning a type of civet in Dusun, and the name was later used to refer to the village as Kampong Lamunin. The word "La" was added simply to ease pronunciation.

== Geography ==
The mukim is located in the east and centre of the Tutong District, bordering Mukim Kiudang to the north, the Limbang District in the Malaysian state of Sarawak to the east, Mukim Rambai to the south and south-west, Mukim Ukong to the west and Mukim Tanjong Maya to north-west.

The mukim is named after Kampong Lamunin, one of the villages it encompasses.

== Demographics ==
As of 2016 census, the population was 4,298 with 51.2% males and 48.8% females. The mukim had 770 households occupying 760 dwellings. The entire population lived in rural areas.

== Administration ==
As of 2021, the mukim comprised the following villages:

Settlements	Population (2021)	Ketua Kampong (2024)
Kampong Lamunin	1,302	Saini bin Haji Othman
Kampong Menengah	143	Muhammad Fitri Zulhilmi bin Haji Muhammad Shah Asnawi
Kampong Bukit Sulang	295	Muhammad Fitri Zulhilmi bin Haji Muhammad Shah Asnawi
Kampong Panchong	398	Muhammad Fitri Zulhilmi bin Haji Muhammad Shah Asnawi
Kampong Bintudoh	300	—N/a
Kampong Bukit Barun	201	—N/a
Kampong Kuala Abang	329	—N/a
Kampong Layong	237	Mohammad Noh bin Haji Md Taib
Kampong Biong	267	—N/a
Kampong Bukit Bang Dalam	161	—N/a
Kampong Bukit Ladan Forest Reserve	8	—N/a

== Villages ==
=== Kampong Lamunin ===
Kampong Lamunin is approximately 36 kilometres (22 mi) from Tutong town and covers an area of 21 square kilometres (8.1 sq mi). According to the 2018 population census, the village has 1,830 residents, with boundaries that include Kampong Piasan, Kampong Bang Nukat or Bintudoh, Kampong Pangkalan Tangsi, Kampong Lamunin Barat, Kampong Lamunin Sentral, part of Kampong Biong, Kampong Pangkalan Mau, and part of Kampong Padnunok, which is Sungai Beruang. The village has 337 houses. The majority of Kampong Lamunin's population consists of the Dusun, Tutong, and Kedayan ethnic groups, while the minority groups include the Iban, Chinese migrants from China, as well as foreign nationals from India, the Philippines, and Indonesia who work and run businesses in the village.

The first inhabitants of Kamoung Lamunin were Awang Gundah, a Dusun man. After that, the Kedayan ethnic group, originally from Kampong Jerudong and Kampong Sengkurong, migrated to Kampong Lamunin. They initially moved there to plant rice as their daily source of income. However, over time, they settled there permanently as they found the area suitable for farming. In 1910, Chinese immigrants from China moved to Kampong Lamunin to seek a livelihood by opening retail shops for the convenience of the villagers. This migration increased the population of the village with people from various ethnic groups. Their presence also contributed significantly to the growth of the local economy and the development of the village. In the early 1940s, the Tutong ethnic group, originally from Kampong Tanjong Maya and Kampong Lubok Pulau, moved to Kampong Lamunin to plant rice. They also eventually made Kampong Lamunin their new home.

In the 1970s, Datu Laila Laju bin Orang Kaya Seri was appointed as the first penghulu of Kampong Lamunin. After his passing, the penghulu position was succeeded by Haji Abang bin Sa'at, followed by Haji Mohd. Yusof bin Mantok. In the past, the appointment of the village head was based on the selection of the villagers, typically choosing someone with strong leadership qualities and influence over their family, which was then extended to their role as village head. The first village head of Kampong Lamunin, elected by the villagers, was Kubu bin Usam. Later, the government officially appointed Hassan bin Tindas to the position, followed by his son, Sabtu bin Hassan. The position was subsequently held by Haji Matnoor bin Burut, followed by Captain (Retired) Dato Paduka Haji Bahar bin Haji Tamat, and later by Major (Retired) Haji Tahamid bin Haji Kula.

=== Kampong Menengah ===
Kampong Menengah spans an area of 0.47 square kilometres (0.18 sq mi). This village, along with Kampong Bukit Sulang, is administered by a single ketua Kampong (village head), as both are situated near each other. According to local oral history, the name "Kampong Menengah" originates from its location between two other villages, Kampong Bintudoh and Kampong Bukit Sulang. In the 1950s, the Kedayan people from Kampong Jerudong and Kampong Sengkurong settled in Kampong Menengah, attracted by the potential for rice farming, which was challenging in their previous locations due to unsuitable soil. Initially, they used Kampong Bukit Sulang for rice cultivation only but eventually relocated to make it a permanent settlement.

=== Kampong Bukit Sulang ===
Kampong Bukit Sulang shares administrative oversight with Kampong Menengah. The village's name is derived from a local tree found on a hill within the village, known for its fruit, the "Buah Sulang." The fruit has yellow pulp that can be used as a natural colouring for cooking yellow rice and making a delicacy called Kelupis Sulang. In the 1950s, the Kedayan settlers initially tried farming in Kampong Tunggulian, Sungai Liang, but found the soil insufficiently fertile for rice cultivation. They then moved to Kampong Bukit Sulang, where they planted padi tugal on approximately six to seven acres of farmland. Over time, what began as a rice farming area grew into a settled community.

In the past, the appointment of a village head for Kampong Bukit Sulang was determined by mutual agreement and consensus among the residents. Generally, the chosen leader was someone respected for their family management skills and strong influence within the community. In the 1950s, Luyak bin Majid became the first appointed village head of Kampong Bukit Sulang. In the 1960s, the position was taken up by Awang Haji Kula bin Hitam, followed by Awang Jabin bin Haji Kula in 1990. From 1 July 2015, Haji Roslee bin Haji Ahad has held the role of village head.

In the early days, before a road was constructed in the village, residents traveled on foot through the forest. Some also used river routes by boat to reach destinations such as Tutong town and Brunei Town. Oral history indicates that the journey on foot from Bukit Sulang to Kampong Jerudong would take between three and seven days. In the 1950s, a road was built in the village, significantly easing travel for its residents.

== Culture ==
The "Makan Taun" and village-wide "Doa Arwah" ceremonies are long-standing cultural traditions of the Kedayan community, held annually to express gratitude after the rice harvesting season. In the past, before the Makan Taun event, villagers would work together to build shelters and prepare the necessary items for the communal feast. Entertainment such as "beanding" and "bemukun" performances added to the festivities. Common dishes at the Makan Taun include "Kelupis Sulang," a type of yellow rice (coloured using Sulang fruit) wrapped in Nyirik (Phrynium) leaves, as well as a variety of traditional foods like turmeric-seasoned meat and creamy Umbut Luba (Eugeissona utilis) shoots.

== Economy ==
Due to its fertile soil and suitability for rice cultivation, the villagers have traditionally made rice farming their main occupation. The rice grown consists of two types: Tugal rice and Paya rice. Tugal rice is particularly popular for its qualities and taste. The harvested rice is usually sold, with some kept for personal use. In addition to rice farming, the villagers also cultivate jelutong rubber and grow fruit trees such as durian, rambutan, langsat, kembayau, rambai, and tampoi. The villagers practised a barter system for trade, exchanging their produce for British goods imported from Singapore, with transactions typically centred in Tutong town. Today, younger people in the village work in the public and private sectors or are self-employed.

== Infrastructures ==
Before receiving water and electricity supplies, the villagers relied on well water for their daily needs and used kerosene lamps at night. In the 1960s, the village underwent changes with the introduction of electricity and water supply lines. In the 1980s, telephone lines were installed and connected to every house. The facilities provided by the government greatly improved the standard of living for the villagers, leading to a better quality of life for the community.

Kampong Lamunin has greatly benefited from the infrastructure provided by the government, including schools, mosques, a health centre, fire services, and a police station, all designed to support the convenience of the villagers. In addition, basic facilities such as water, electricity, and telephone services have made it easier for the villagers to manage their daily affairs more efficiently, thus improving their standard of living. Lamunin Health Centre serves as the community health centre for local residents as well as those in Mukim Rambai, Mukim Ukong, Mukim Kiudang, and Mukim Tanjong Maya. Other key local facilities include the Lamunin Post Office, Lamunin Police Station, and Lamunin Fire Station.

=== Education ===
In the 1940s, Lamunin School was built in Kampong Lamunin through a gotong-royong effort by the villagers. The school, located behind the Haji Abang sawmill building, measured 50 by 20 feet (15.2 m × 6.1 m). It was constructed using round wooden posts, bamboo walls, and a thatched roof made of rumbia leaves. At that time, the school had more than 20 students, and the first headmaster was Awangku Besar bin Pengiran Ahmad. The school offered grades one to three, with most of the students transferring from Tanjong Maya and Lubok Pulau Malay Schools, following their families who had moved to Kampong Lamunin for rice farming. In 1950, a permanent building for Lamunin Primary School was constructed, not far from the original school. Over time, the school saw improvements in its educational offerings and facilities, in line with the government's efforts to modernise schools in rural areas to be on par with those in urban areas.

On 23 July 1961, Kampong Menengah Malay School was opened by Pengiran Kerma Indera Pengiran Mohammed. The school began operating with an enrollment of 40 students, and its first headmaster was Awang Judin bin Karim. On 21 February 1998, construction of a new school building commenced, with a foundation-laying ceremony officiated by Haji Dennis bin Haji Rosli, the director of schools at the time. The entire construction project cost approximately B$4.36 million. The building was completed on 17 February 1999, and the official handover of keys took place on 22 April 1999, marking the beginning of its use. The school shares its facilities with Kampong Menengah Religious School.

=== Religion ===
In 1955, a mosque was built in Kampong Lamunin through a gotong-royong effort by the villagers, with the initiative led by Abang Haji Yusof bin Haji Abdul Rahman and others. The mosque was constructed on a 4-acre waqf land donated by Haji Sulaiman bin Haji Abdul Rahman, with a total cost of approximately B$3,000. In 1961, Haji Khatam bin Imam Ismail was appointed as the temporary imam and was officially appointed as the permanent imam in 1964. Due to the mosque's deteriorating condition and the growing number of worshippers, it was repaired and renovated at a cost of $1,000, funded by public donations. In 1977, a new mosque was built near the site of the old mosque, on a 14 acres (5.7 ha) waqf land also donated by Haji Sulaiman bin Haji Abdul Rahman, bringing the total waqf land for the mosque to 1½ acres. This new mosque could accommodate between 150 and 200 worshippers. On 30 November 1979, the mosque was officially opened by Pengiran Muhammad Ali, in conjunction with the early arrival of the 15th century Hijrah. Since the opening ceremony took place on a Friday, Abdul Hamid Bakal, the Chief Kadi of Brunei, delivered the Friday sermon and led the Friday prayers.

The first mosque in Kampong Menengah was constructed on 24 June 1972, led by Haji Abdul Rahman bin Haji Piah and funded through community donations and government support on a 0.50 acres (0.20 ha) site near the Kampong Menengah Malay School. Completed on 23 February 1973, Haji Abdul Rahman became the mosque's imam, with Ghani bin Haji Nordin as bilal. Due to the growing congregation, a larger mosque was approved under Brunei's 5th National Development Plan, with construction beginning on 25 September 1988 on a four-acre plot costing $500,000. It opened on 22 February 1990, coinciding with Brunei's 6th National Day, and was officially inaugurated by Deputy Minister of Religious Affairs Yahya Ibrahim on 27 July 1990. The mosque, accommodating 230 worshippers, includes facilities such as a minaret, parking, ablution areas, and a library used for study and funeral services.

- Kampong Bang Dalam Mosque — originally a balai ibadat ("prayer hall") which was built in 1988. A new mosque was built to replace the balai ibadat; it was opened for use on 5 January 2000.
- Kampong Layong Mosque — inaugurated on 20 July 1990; it can accommodate 300 worshippers.

=== Places of interest ===
As a result, with the three ethnic groups settling in the village, the villagers agreed to name the group of ethnicities as "Gong Tiga". Gong Tiga was founded by Dato Paduka Haji Bahar bin Haji Tamat. The establishment of Gong Tiga reflects the three ethnic groups—the Dusun, Kedayan, and Tutong—that settled in Kampong Lamunin before the Japanese occupation of Brunei. Through Gong Tiga, the villagers of Kampong Lamunin also used the same traditional musical instrument, the gong, for cultural events such as weddings, cultural performances, and funeral ceremonies for the Dusun people. The Gong Tiga monument, located in front of the Kampong Lamunin Community Hall, was inaugurated by Sultan Hassanal Bolkiah during his visit to open the Binutan water dam in Tutong on 23 November 1992.

== Notable people ==
- Ali Apong (born 1958), a politician
