= Mukim Ukong =

Mukim of Brunei

- Mukim
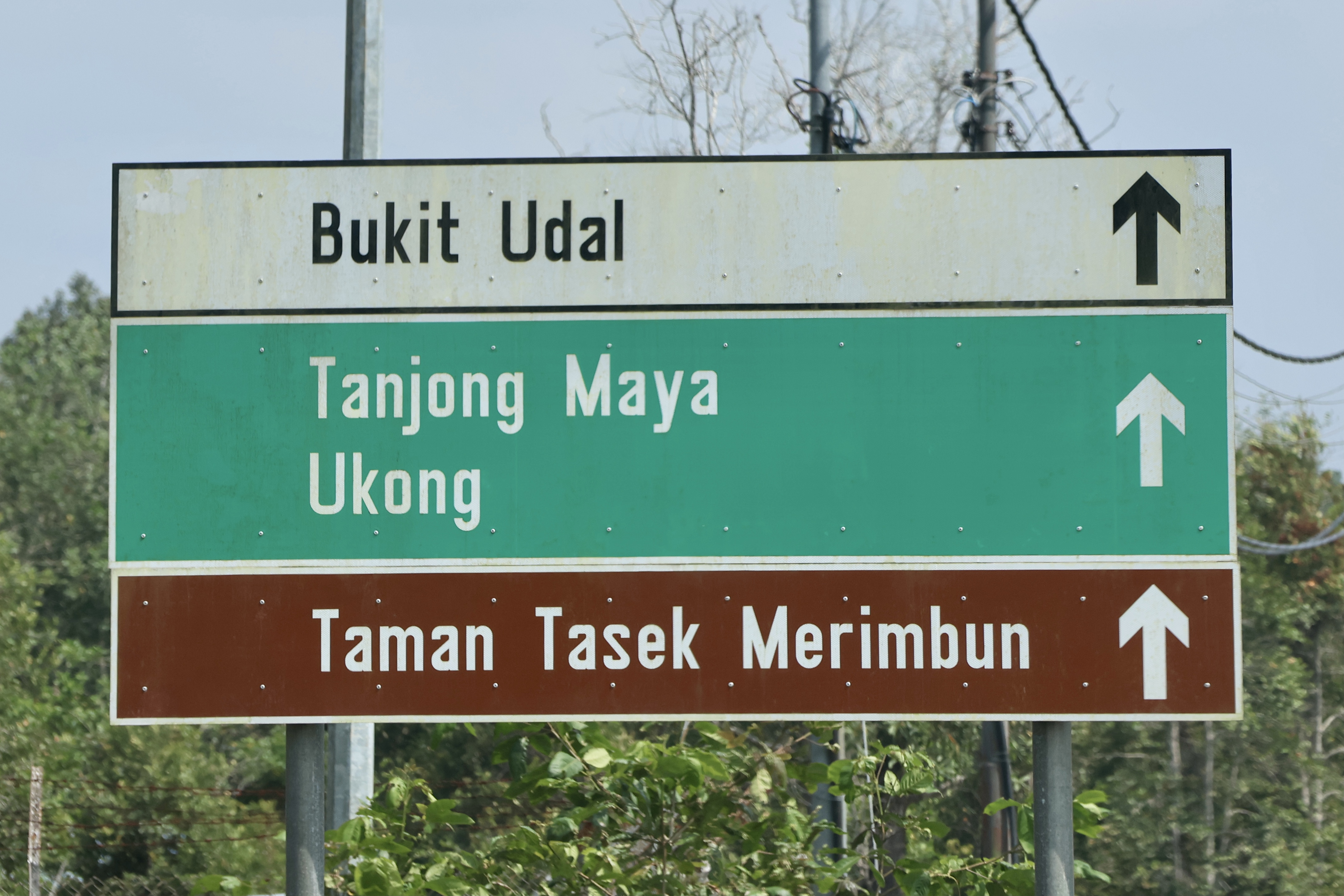
- Road sign to Tanjong Maya and Ukong

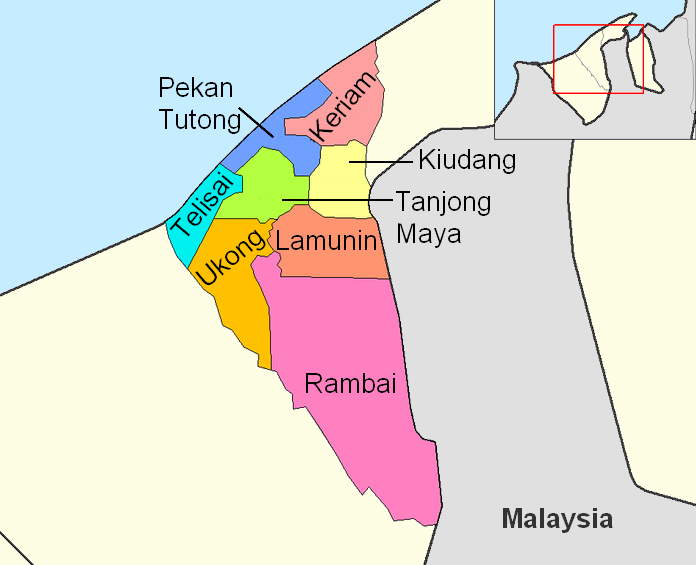
- Ukong is in orange.
- Coordinates: 4°48′47″N 114°41′45″E
- Country: Brunei
- District: Tutong

Government
  - Penghulu: Mohamad Danial Ya'akub

Area
  - Total: 144 km^{2} (56 sq mi)

Population (2021)
  - Total: 2,029
  - Density: 14.1/km^{2} (36.5/sq mi)
- Time zone: UTC+8 (BNT)
- Postcode: TFxx47

Mukim Ukong is a mukim in Tutong District, Brunei. The population was 2,272 in 2016.

== Etymology ==
According to folktales, in the olden days there was a swamp known as Nong Anggeh located between the river and Nong Anggeh Hill. The condition of this swamp was bumpy and difficult for pedestrians to pass through. This swamp is also the only main road leading to the opposite village. Since there was no other road at that time, the villagers had to go through that road. When they go through the swamp while carrying their children then they have to support or mean to carry their children on their shoulders. The conditions and processing caused this area to be called 'kukong'. Over time this call remained until today and was referred to as 'Kampung Ukong'. The mukim could be named after Kampong Ukong, one of the villages it encompasses.

== Geography ==
The mukim is located in the south-west of Tutong District, bordering Mukim Tanjong Maya to the north-east, Mukim Lamunin to the east, Mukim Rambai to the south-east, Mukim Bukit Sawat in Belait District to the south-west and Mukim Telisai to the north-west.

== Demographics ==
As of 2016 census, the population was 2,272 with 50.8% males and 49.2% females. The mukim had 422 households occupying 412 dwellings. The entire population lived in rural areas.

== Administration ==
As of 2021, the mukim includes the following populated villages:

Settlements	Population (2021)	Ketua kampung (2024)
Kampong Ukong	346	Muhammad Hakimi bin Abdullah Gampar
Kampong Sungai Damit Pemadang	492	—N/a
Kampong Pengkalan Ra'an	104	—N/a
Kampong Pak Bidang	224	—N/a
Kampong Bukit	640	Muhammad Hafizul Azmee bin Abdullah Zaman @ Azmee bin Zaman
Kampong Long Mayan	223	Muhammad Hafizul Azmee bin Abdullah Zaman @ Azmee bin Zaman

== Economy ==
Reed trees have many uses, one of them is processed into ambulung, which is one of the traditional foods of the people. Ambulung or sago is a type of starch obtained from the stem of the reed tree. These reed trees usually grow in small groups in mixed areas of swamp and clay. There are two types of reeds, common reeds and thorny reeds. Thatch trees can be obtained from areas in Kampong Ukong and its surroundings including Kampong Long Mayan, Kampong Layong, Kampong Penapar and Sungai Damit. There are sago entrepreneurs who are actively working on ambulung companies located on EDR land. 1428 Lot No. 1396. The factory has been operating for more than 20 years and is a family business owned by Syarikat Perusahaan Sagu Yong Pin Chin and Sons. The company is the only ambulung supplier in Tutong District. This factory has been operating since the beginning of 1971 and has modern equipment that is run by several workers from abroad and also locally. Previously, the Yong Pin Chin Sago Industry Company processed sago traditionally located at the head of the Kampong Sungai Ukong.

According to the Assistant Secretary of Majlis Perundingan Kampung (MPK) Bukit, Dayang Nilam binti Lundu, in addition to the efforts carried out by MPK as stated, MPK Bukit also produces products known as 'rice coffee and tea' which are currently being welcomed by the public not only around Tutong District and even in other districts in the country. 'Rice coffee and tea' sold at BND2.00 was also exhibited at expos held in Tutong District.

== Infrastructure ==
The originally orange-brown dirt walkway is now covered to varied degrees with gravel and cement. Any automobile should be able to reach Brunei's border by the middle of 2018 if the road improvement is completed and the potholes and cracked pavement along Jalan Merangking are repaired. Asphalted road infrastructure, a clean water supply, power, and phone lines are a few of them. Additionally, Kampong Bukit is home to the mosque, the Hajah Aminah Kampong Long Mayan Worship Hall, the Kampong Bukit Police Post, the Kampong Bukit Multipurpose Hall, the Kampong Long Mayan Community Hall, the Kampong Long Mayan Guest Booth, the Kampong Bukit Handicraft Heritage Gallery, the DPS Ukong Primary School, and the Kampung Bukit Elementary School.
