= Kampong Ukong =

Village in Brunei

Ukong
- Village
- Kampong Ukong
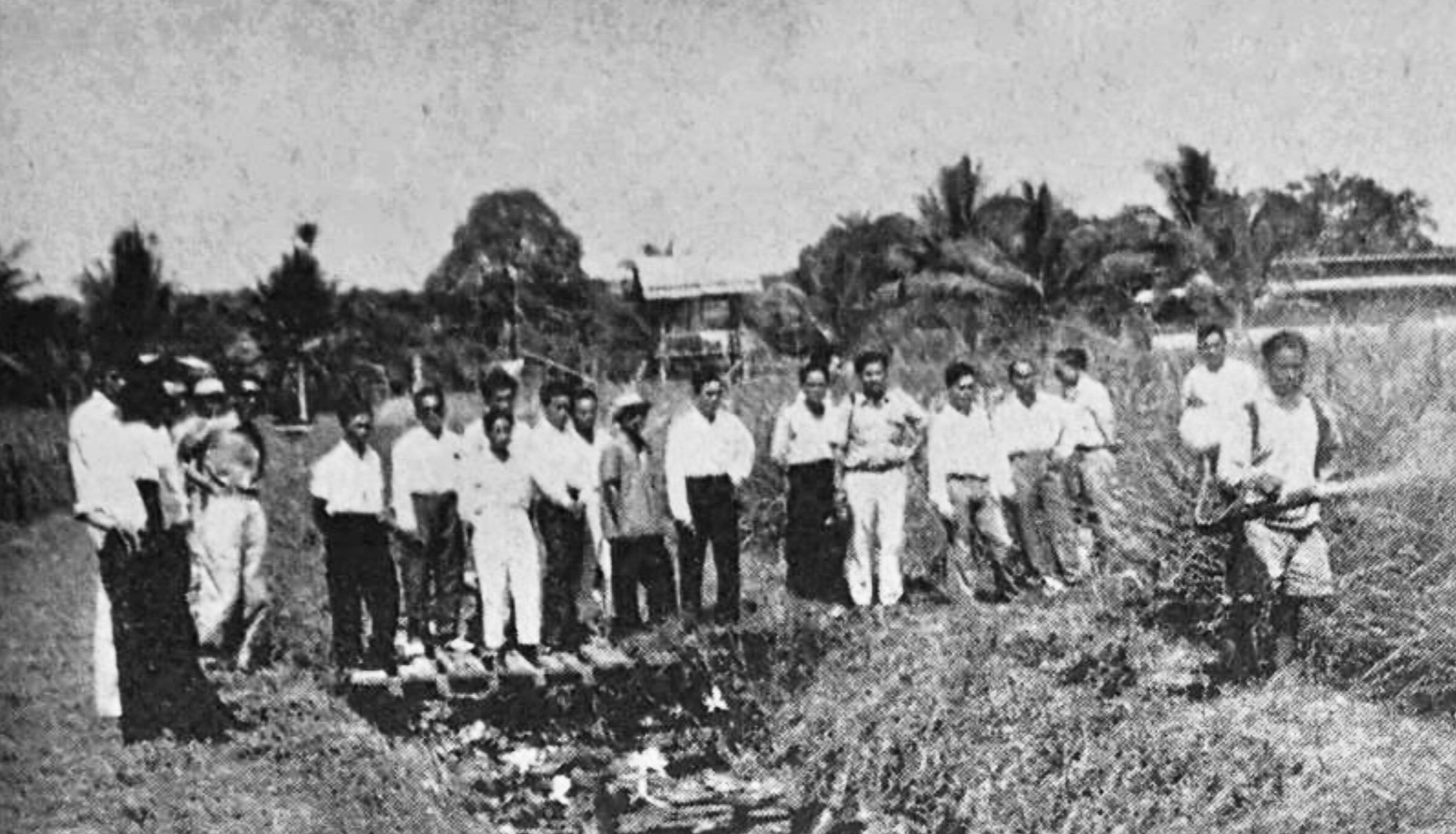
- Kampong Ukong in 1966

- Location in Brunei
- Coordinates: 4°40′08″N 114°38′41″E
- Country: Brunei
- District: Tutong
- Mukim: Ukong

Government
  - Village head: Hakimi Abdullah Gampar

Area
  - Total: 26 km^{2} (10 sq mi)

Population (2016)
  - Total: 381
  - Density: 15/km^{2} (38/sq mi)
- Time zone: UTC+8 (BNT)
- Postcode: TF1147

Kampong Ukong (Malay: Kampung Ukong) or simply known as Ukong, is a village in the central part of Tutong District, Brunei, about 20 kilometres (12 mi) from the district town Pekan Tutong. The population was 381 in 2016. It is one of the villages within Mukim Ukong, a mukim in the district.

== Etymology ==
According to folktales, in the olden days there was a swamp known as Nong Anggeh located between the river and Nong Anggeh Hill. The condition of this swamp was bumpy and difficult for pedestrians to pass through. This swamp is also the only main road leading to the opposite village. Since there was no other road at that time, the villagers had to go through that road. When they go through the swamp while carrying their children then they have to support or mean to carry their children on their shoulders. The conditions and processing caused this area to be called 'kukong'. Over time this call remained until today and was referred to as 'Kampung Ukong'.

== Administration ==
The village head (ketua kampung) oversees the village proper as well as Kampong Pangkalan Dong, Kampong Pangkalan Ran, Kampong Pak Bidang and Kampong Sungai Damit Pemadang, with a total area of 26 square kilometres (10 sq mi) and a total population of 1,292.

== Demography ==
As of 2018, the village have 220 houses inhabited by 1,292 residents consisting of 622 men and 630 women. According to the head of the village, the population of the village consists of 1,200 Malays; followed by the Chinese 91 people and the rest of the Iban tribe.

== Economy ==
Among the products produced by the residents of Kampong Ukong is ambulung (sago), which the processing place of ambulung is a place that is often visited by tourists from abroad and within the country. The ambulung company owned by Syarikat Perusahaan Sagu Yong Pin Chin dan Anak-Anak has been operating since the beginning of 1971 and has modern equipment run by workers consisting of four local residents and four from abroad where before all the workers the factory consists of family members only. The packaging of sago flour is by using plastic. The sago flour production process is carried out four times within ten days which means four times the process is done in the sago factory to obtain sago flour results which are estimated to weigh 800 kilograms of sago flour for each processing time.

== Infrastructure ==
The village primary school is Dato Pemancha Saging Ukong Primary School. It also shares grounds with Dato Pemancha Saging Ukong Religious School, the village school for the country's Islamic religious primary education.

== Notable people ==
- Lukan Uking, legislative councillor
- Othman Uking (born 1937), civil servant and politician
