= Tasek Merimbun =

Lake in Brunei

Merimbun Lake
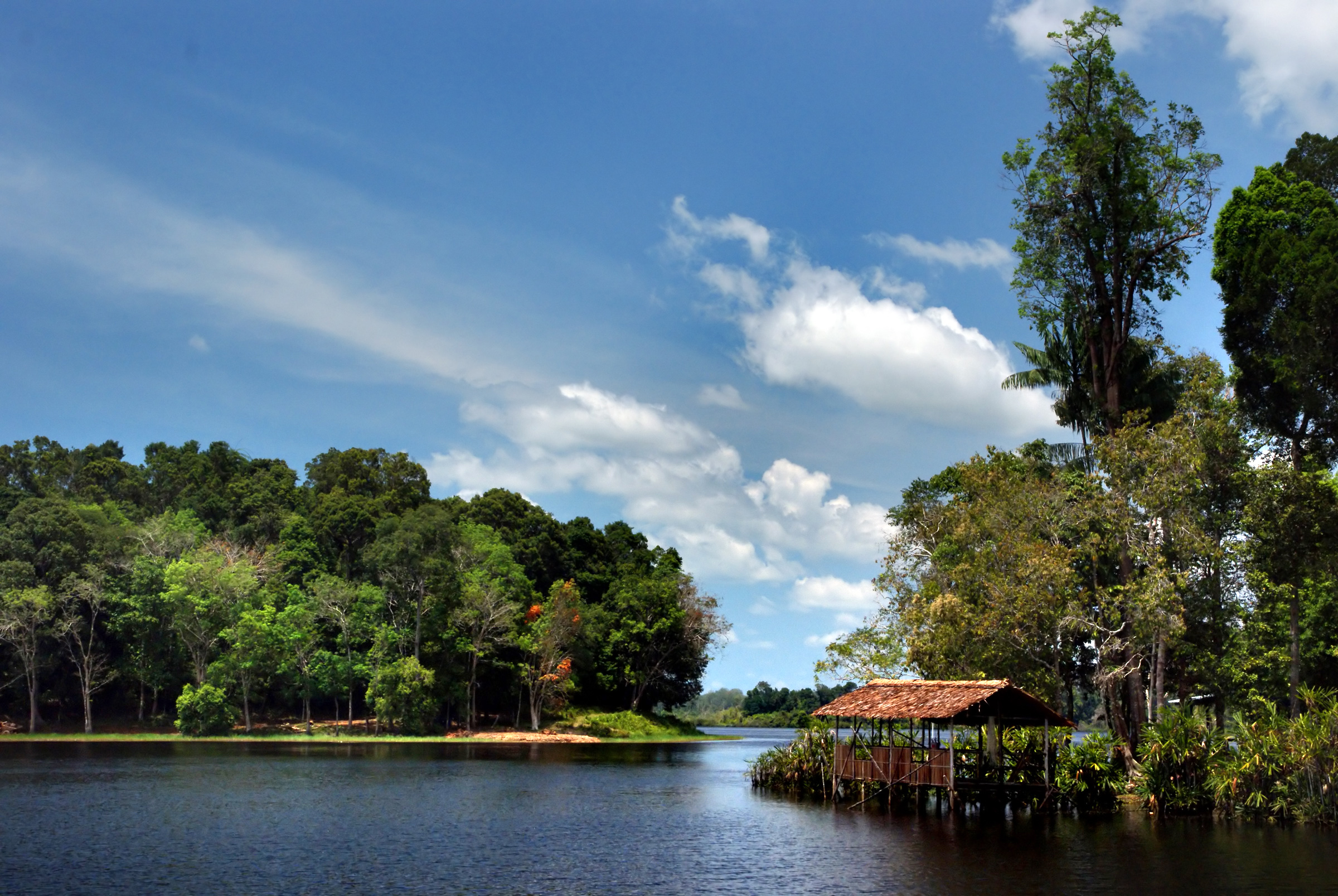
- Tasek Merimbun Heritage Park

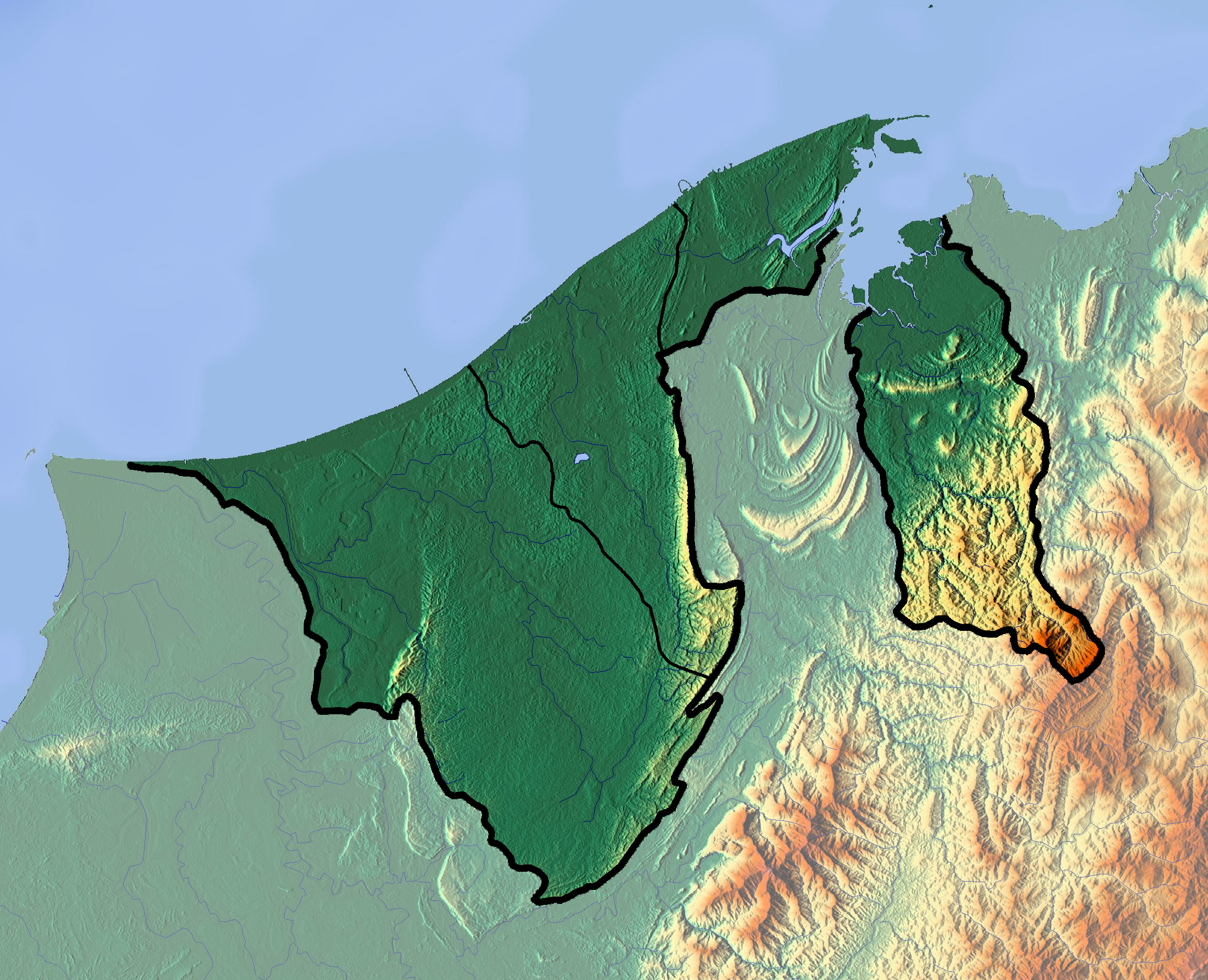
- Location within Brunei
- Location: Brunei-Muara, Brunei
- Coordinates: 4.5939749°N 114.6770941°E
- Basin countries: Brunei
- Max. length: 500 m (1,600 ft)
- Surface elevation: 88 m (289 ft)
- Islands: Jurundung; Labi-Labi

Merimbun Lake (Malay: Tasek Merimbun) is the largest natural lake in Brunei. It is located near Mukim Rambai in the Tutong District, about 70 kilometres (43 mi) from the capital, Bandar Seri Begawan. The S-shaped lake is located 27 km from Tutong Town and it is surrounded by the 7,800-hectare (19,000-acre) park.

== Etymology ==
The Dusun Brunei are believed to have lived in Merimbun for several centuries, with the area’s discovery often attributed to a man named Imbun. According to local tradition, Imbun was the son of a village head from Merangking Hilir in the Belait District. He is said to have discovered the lake while hunting, and upon realizing the area's abundance of food—wild animals in the surrounding forest and fish in the lake—he decided to settle there with his family. Soon, other villagers followed his lead. In tribute to Imbun, the lake and its surrounding area came to be known as Tasek Merimbun, a name that has persisted over time.

The etymology of the name "Merimbun" holds an additional layer of intrigue. As the Dusun people established their settlement, it is believed that traders frequently visited the area, bringing goods to trade. One such trader was a Chinese merchant named Eng Boon. According to legend, the name Merimbun is derived from Eng Boon's middle name, offering an alternate origin to the place’s moniker, with a connection to the merchant's presence in the region.

== History ==
The early settlement of hunter-gatherers in the area was self-sufficient, with their way of life deeply connected to the lake and the resources it provided. The community lived without modern roads or infrastructure, relying on the natural surroundings for survival. On Pulau Jelundong, the ruins of a sacred ancestral site were discovered, hinting at the area's historical significance. Tasek Merimbun is believed to be one of the first Dusun villages in the Tutong District, marking its importance in the region's early history.

In 1967, the first director of the Museums Department identified Tasek Merimbun as a valuable asset with the potential to become a wildlife sanctuary. A survey conducted between 1983 and 1984, which focused on the area's biodiversity and socio-economic activities, led to the discovery of a rare white-collared fruit bat. This finding played a significant role in the designation of Tasek Merimbun Heritage Park as the first ASEAN Heritage Park on 29 November 1984. The park was recognised as a wildlife sanctuary, recreation center, flora and fauna conservation area, and a site for research and surveys.

The park was officially inaugurated at the Tasek Merimbun Heritage Park Exhibition Hall on 27 May 2000, by Datin Azizah Abdullah, who represented the then permanent secretary at the Ministry of Culture, Youth and Sports.

== Features ==
Tasek Merimbun is renowned for its dark-colored water, a result of tannins from decaying leaves that fall into the lake. The lake is home to a rich diversity of fauna, including birds, mammals, and reptiles, making it a haven for wildlife enthusiasts. Visitors can hire boats to explore the lake and its two islands, with one small island accessible via a wooden walkway. This island features a picnic pavilion made from logs, providing a peaceful spot to relax. Nearby, chalet facilities are available for researchers. Additionally, the park has been designated by BirdLife International as an Important Bird Area, as its forest and freshwater wetland habitats are home to endangered Storm's storks.

== See also ==
- Protected areas of Brunei
