= Kampong Bukit =

Village in Brunei

- Village
- Location in Brunei
- Coordinates: 4°36′01″N 114°37′30″E
- Country: Brunei
- District: Tutong
- Mukim: Ukong

Government
  - Village head: Muhammad Hafizul Azmee

Area
  - Total: 41 km^{2} (16 sq mi)

Population (2016)
  - Total: 674
  - Density: 16/km^{2} (43/sq mi)
- Time zone: UTC+8 (BNT)
- Postcode: TF3147

Kampong Bukit is a remote village in Tutong District, Brunei, about 33 kilometres (21 mi) from the district town Pekan Tutong. The population was 674 in 2016. It is one of the villages within Mukim Ukong, a mukim subdivision in the district. Along the way through the village, there are fruit orchards such as durian, rambutan and so on. It was also seen that some villagers were carrying out the work of planting rice seedlings in a two-acre paddy field allocated to interested villagers. Among the rice that is grown are pusu rice and adan rice.

== Infrastructure ==
Kampong Bukit Primary School is the village primary school. It also shares grounds with Kampong Bukit Religious School, the village school for the country's Islamic religious primary education.

The village mosque is Kampong Bukit Mosque; it was built in 1997 and can accommodate 200 worshippers.

The sole gallery in Mukim Ukong, this showroom or handicraft gallery is situated in the Kampong Bukit Multi-Purpose Hall. This expansive gallery serves as a destination for local and international tourists and showcases the gems of the local handcraft tradition. Additionally, local children who are interested in handicrafts can visit this exhibition. The gallery holds and exhibits locally crafted crafts including weaving and handmade items. For individuals who are interested in buying, the models on display make ordering easier.

== Economy ==
The Majlis Perundingan Kampung (MPK) Bukit launched the Projek Penanaman Ladang Padi Berkelompok (Clustered Rice Farm Planting Project) in the Melaboi region, which began in the first quarter of 2008, in order to further enhance the economic situation of the village community. Pusu rice and bario rice are two varieties of rice that are grown. With a total area of around 20 acres, MPK Bukit also cultivates paddy privately. According to the Assistant Secretary of Majlis Perundingan Kampung (MPK) Bukit, Dayang Nilam binti Lundu, in addition to the efforts carried out by MPK as stated, MPK Bukit also produces products known as 'rice coffee and tea' which are currently being welcomed by the public not only around Tutong District and even in other districts in the country. 'Rice coffee and tea' sold at BND2.00 was also exhibited at expos held in Tutong District.
