= Mukim Bukit Sawat =

Mukim of Brunei

Coordinates: 4°27′09″N 114°24′04″E

- Mukim
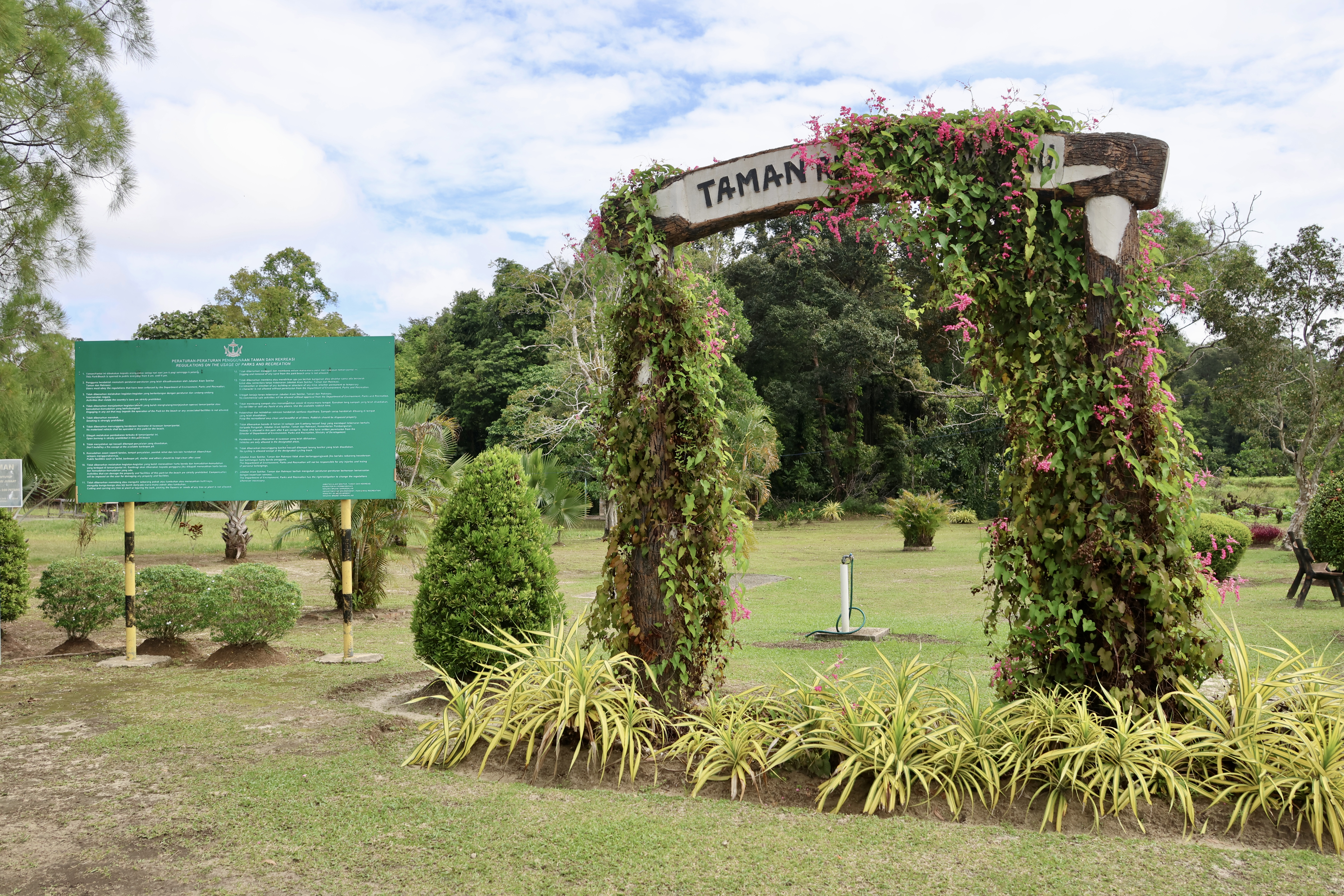
- Sungai Mau Recreational Park

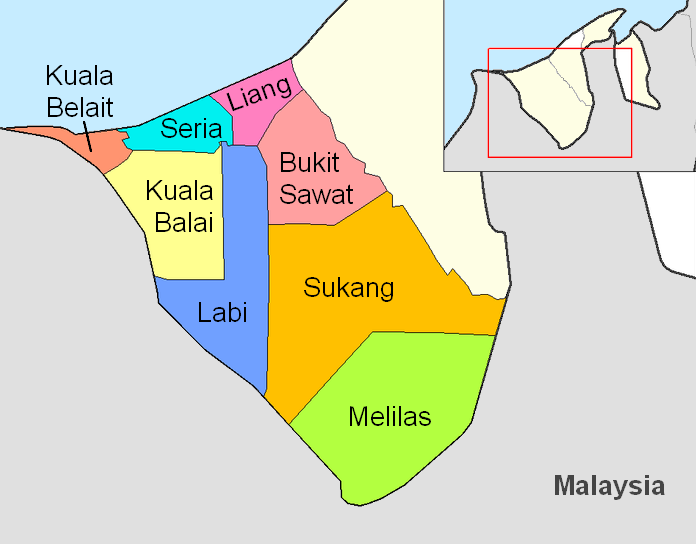
- Bukit Sawat is in peach.
- Country: Brunei
- District: Belait

Government
  - Penghulu: Salleh Othman

Population (2021)
  - Total: 759
- Time zone: UTC+8 (BNT)
- Postcode: KFxx38

Mukim Bukit Sawat is a mukim in Belait District, Brunei. It had a population of 794 in 2016.

== Geography ==
The mukim is located in the east of Belait District, bordering Mukim Telisai, Mukim Ukong and Mukim Rambai of Tutong District to the north, north-east and east respectively, Mukim Sukang to the south, Mukim Labi to the west and Mukim Liang to the north-west.

The mukim is named after Kampong Bukit Sawat, one of the villages it encompasses.

== Demographics ==
As of the 2016 census, the population was 794 with 57.1% males and 42.9% females. The mukim had 220 households occupying 220 dwellings. The entire population lived in rural areas.

== Administration ==
As of 2021, the mukim comprised the following villages:

Settlements	Population (2021)	Ketua kampung (2024)
Kampong Sungai Mau	407	—N/a
Kampong Bisut	0	—N/a
Kampong Bukit Sawat	98	Mohammad bin Abdullah @ Lim Swee Ann
Kampong Pulau Apil	43	—N/a
Kampong Tarap	11	—N/a
Kampong Bukit Kandol	1	—N/a
Kampong Merangking	24	—N/a
Kampong Merangking Ulu	80	Raimey bin Abdullah
Kampong Merangking Hilir	95	Raimey bin Abdullah
Kampong Melayan	0	—N/a

== Facilities ==
=== Schools ===
The primary schools (sekolah rendah) in the mukim include:

- Merangking Primary School
- Orang Kaya Pemancha Berandai Primary School, Bukit Sawat — initially established as a Malay school and built in 1932. A newer building was inaugurated on 28 August 1971 to replace the older building.

Each school also houses a sekolah ugama (school for the country's Islamic religious primary education).

=== Mosques ===
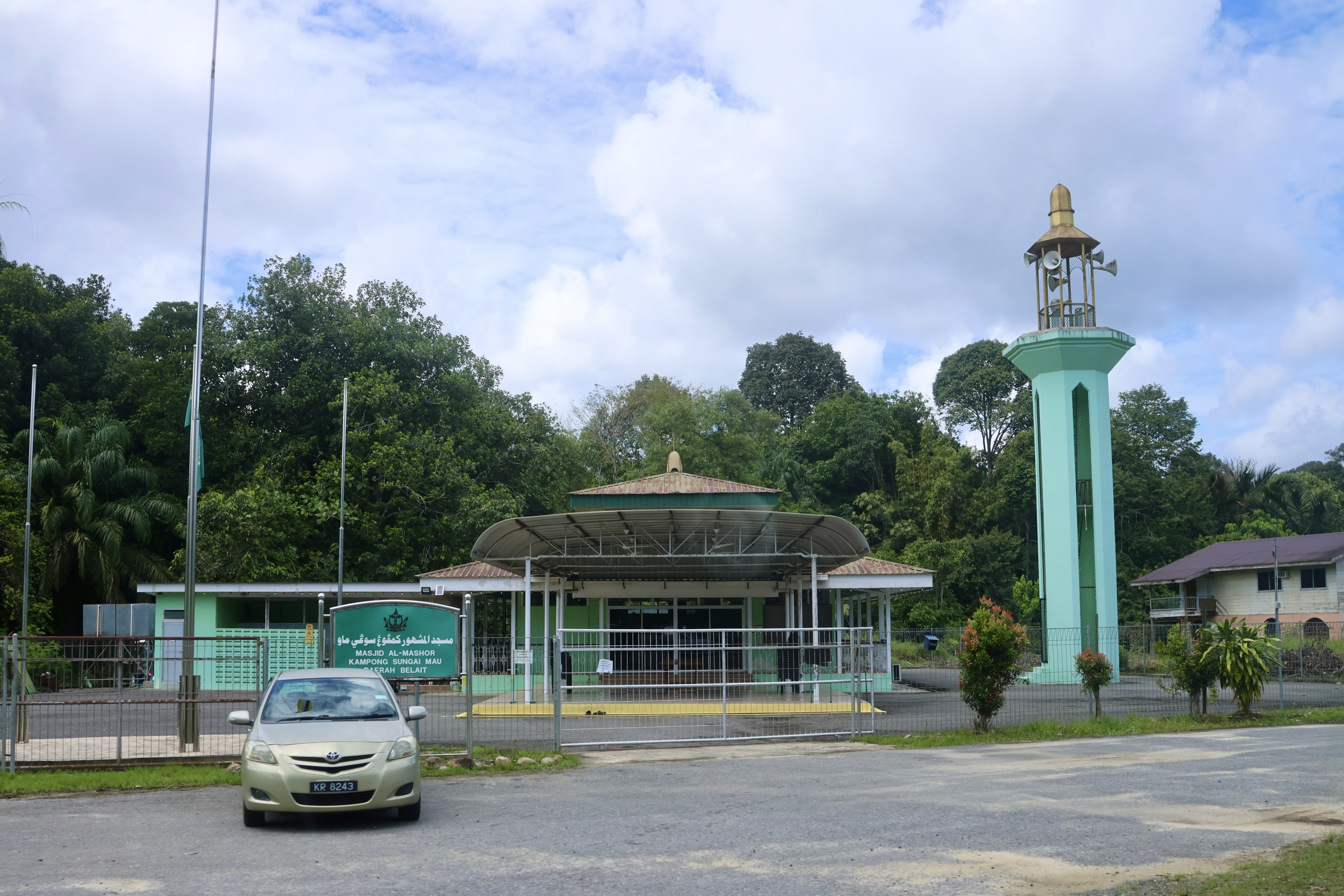
Al-Mashor Mosque

- Al-Mashor Mosque, Kampong Sungai Mau — inaugurated by the then Prince Al-Muhtadee Billah on 28 February 1992; it can accommodate 200 worshippers.
- Balai Ibadat Kampong Merangking
- Kampong Bukit Sawat Mosque — built in 1990 and can accommodate 120 worshippers.

=== Tourism and recreation ===
- Sungai Mau Recreation Park — a recreation park in Kampong Sungai Mau
