= Benutan Dam =

Dam in Tutong, Brunei

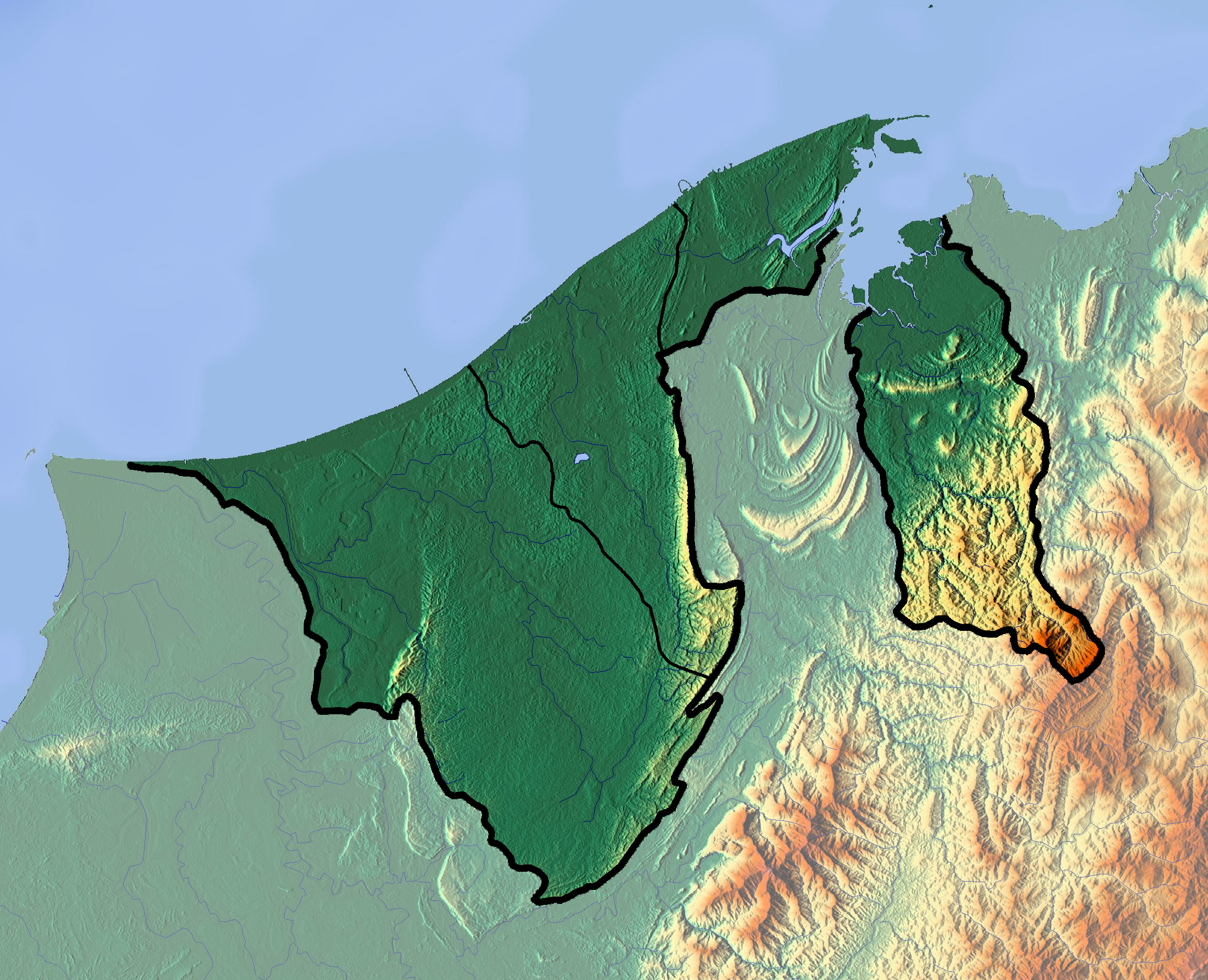
- Location within Brunei
- Country: Brunei
- Location: Tutong District
- Coordinates: 4°37′45.32″N 114°45′02.69″E
- Purpose: Water supply
- Status: Operational
- Opening date: 1988; 38 years ago

Dam and spillways
- Type of dam: Embankment
- Impounds: Benutan River
- Height: 22 m (72 ft)

Reservoir
- Total capacity: 45,000,000 m^{3} (36,000 acre⋅ft)
- Catchment area: 28.5 m (94 ft)

The Benutan Dam, also spelled Binutan, is an embankment dam on the Benutan River in Tutong District, Brunei. The dam was completed in 1988 with the primary purpose of increasing water supply to the capital of Brunei, Bandar Seri Begawan. It has a normal reservoir volume of 45,000,000 m^{3} (36,000 acre⋅ft).

== See also ==
- Ulu Tutong Dam
