= Brunei Shell Petroleum =

Joint venture in Brunei

Coordinates: 4°36′24″N 114°17′33″E

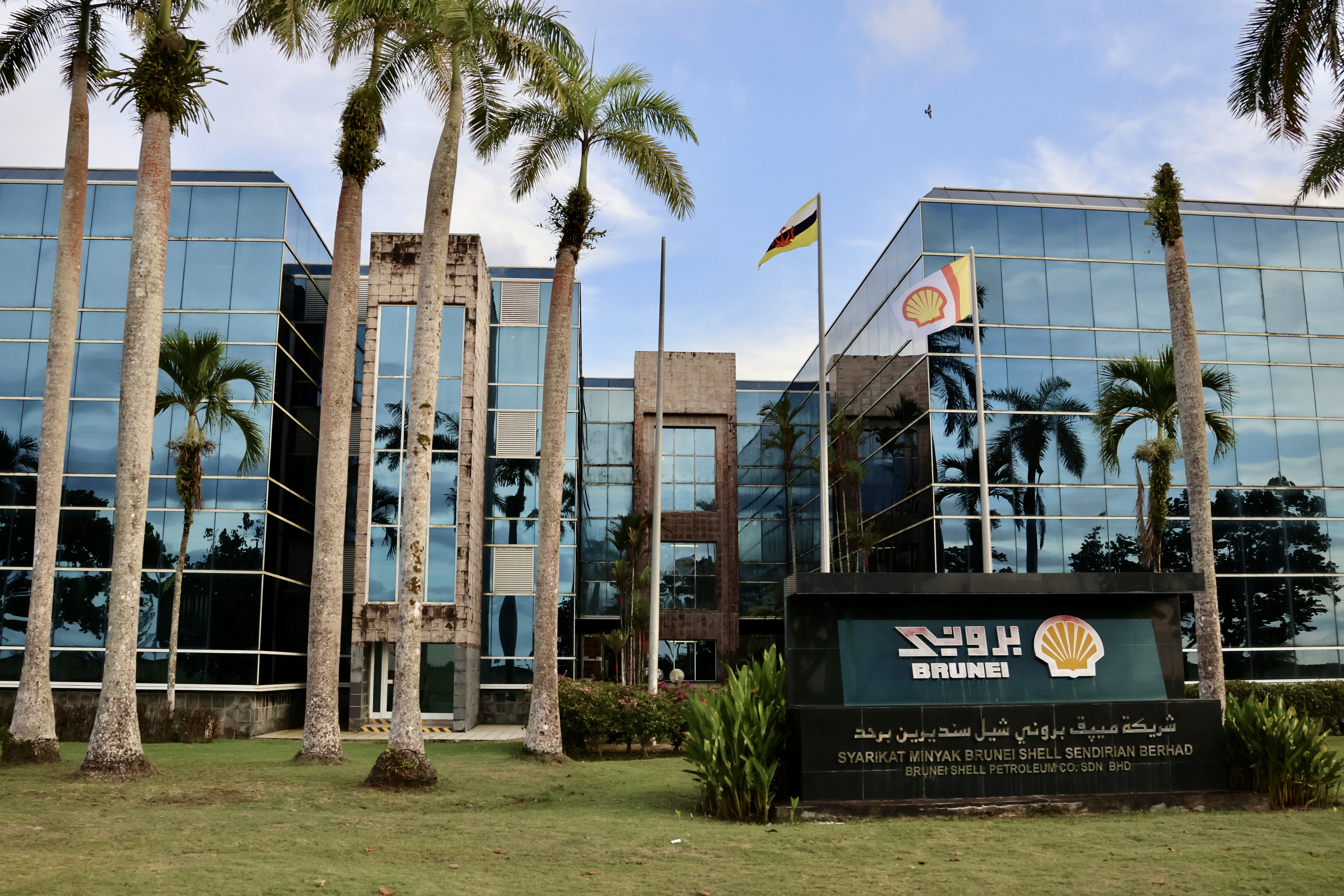
- BSP Head Office building in Panaga, Seria
- Type: Joint venture
- Industry: Petroleum
- Predecessor: British Malayan Petroleum Company (1922–1957)
- Founded: 1 January 1957; 69 years ago
- Headquarters: Jalan Utara, Panaga, Seria KB2933, Brunei
- Area served: Brunei
- Key people: Johan Atema (managing director)
- Products: Coal seam gas, liquefied natural gas, natural gas, aviation fuel
- Owner: Shell plc Government of Brunei
- Parent: Shell plc
- Website: www.shell.com.bn

Brunei Shell Petroleum (BSP) is a joint venture between the Royal Dutch/Shell Group and the government of Brunei, primarily responsible for the exploration and production of oil and liquefied natural gas (LNG). Originally known as the British Malayan Petroleum Company (BMPC), it was established in 1922 with concessions across Brunei. After early unsuccessful drilling at Labi, BMPC struck oil in Seria in 1929, initiating Brunei's petroleum industry. In 1957, BMPC was restructured as BSP, headquartered locally to reflect Brunei's role in the sector. BSP's discoveries influenced Sultan Omar Ali Saifuddien III's decision not to join Malaysia in 1963, which contributed to Brunei maintaining control over its oil resources and economic independence.

Over the decades, BSP expanded onshore and offshore operations, with the Bruneian government progressively increasing its stake, 25% in 1973 and 50% in 1985. The Petroleum Unit under the Prime Minister's Office, and later the Brunei Oil and Gas Authority, provided regulatory oversight. By the late 1990s, despite the presence of competitors, BSP held the majority of concessions, operating over 10,000 square kilometres (3,900 sq mi) of concessions, most offshore, and continuing to contribute to Brunei's economy and state revenue.

By the late 20th century, BSP had five main businesses. Its core operations covered oil and LNG exploration and production. Brunei Shell Marketing (BSM), set up in 1974, handled domestic sales of petroleum products. The LNG sector included Brunei LNG (BLNG), Brunei Coldgas (BCG), and Brunei Shell Tankers (BST), responsible for liquefaction, marketing, and shipping. BLNG, created in 1969 as a joint venture with the government, Shell, and Mitsubishi, ran the Lumut LNG plant. BCG and BST managed LNG transport and trade. This structure enabled Brunei to supply LNG to the Asia–Pacific region and contributed to the country’s energy sector.

== History ==
On 20 July 1922, the British Malayan Petroleum Company (BMPC) was established under the Royal Dutch-Shell group and registered as a business in the United Kingdom. The Asiatic Petroleum Company and Shell's Anglo-Saxon Petroleum Company sold oil-prospecting concessions to the BMPC the same year, giving the BMPC mining and prospecting rights in Brunei. Shell gained major share of control over oil exploration in Borneo as a result of the arrangement, which saw the BMPC pay a royalty of two shillings per ton (or 10% in kind) to the Bruneian government and another shilling to the British Borneo Petroleum Syndicate.

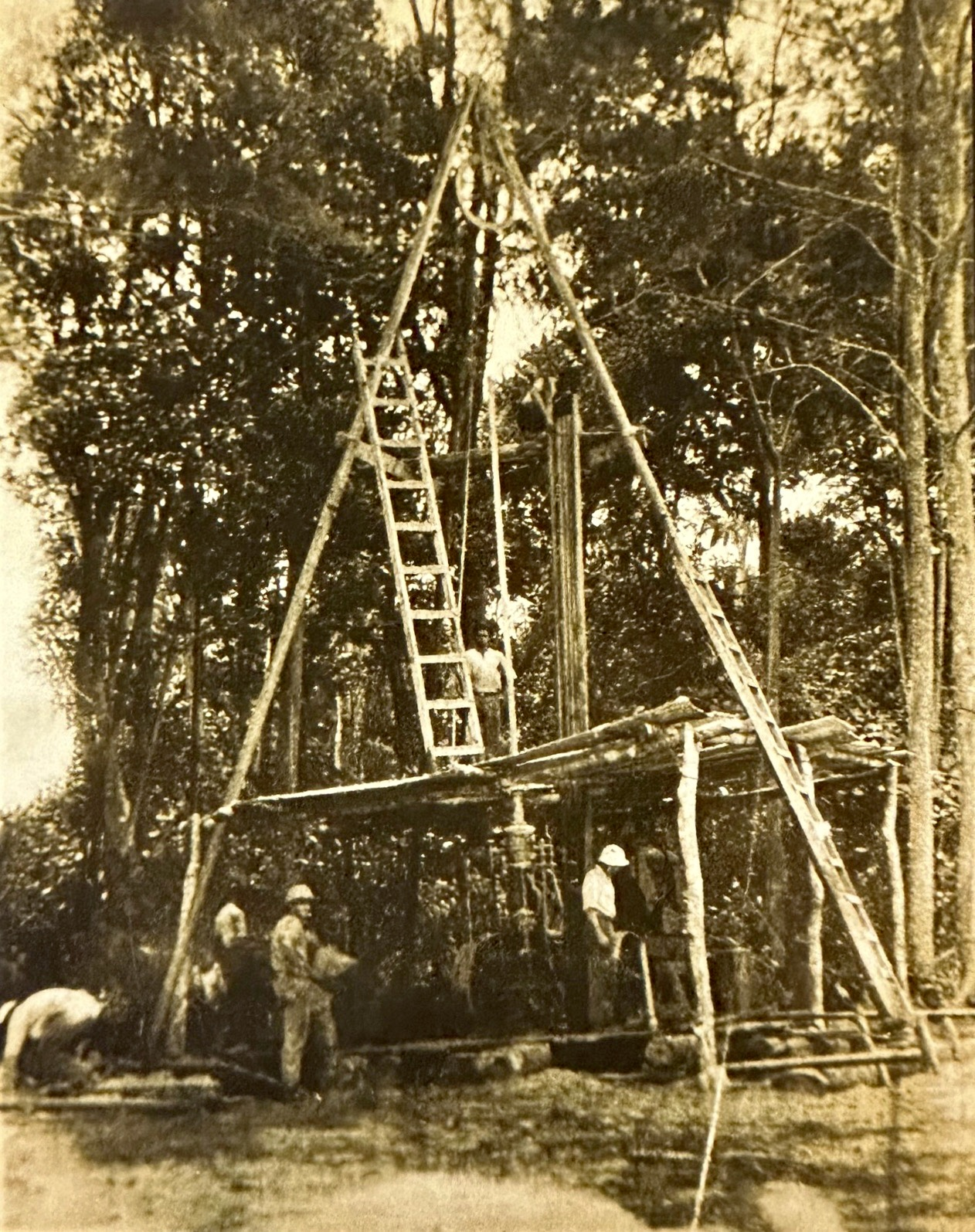
Labi drilling team in 1926

In 1922, BMPC began oil exploration in Labi, Brunei, where previous attempts by other companies had failed to yield significant results. The prospecting license of the Anglo-Saxon Petroleum Company in the Tutong District was renewed in November 1922 under the new name of the BMPC. Later, on 28 July 1923, an agreement was made for the BMPC to acquire the British Borneo Petroleum Syndicate's Belait District properties. The BMPC carried out an aerial reconnaissance on 9 March 1925, and neither the Sarawakian nor Bruneian governments objected to the plan. After encountering difficulties in Labi, BMPC shifted its focus to the area between the Seria and Bera rivers, where it discovered oil deposits in April 1929. By 1949, BMPC had expanded its exploration efforts to include Brunei Town (now Bandar Seri Begawan), Tutong, and the areas between Seria and Labi. Offshore exploration began in 1952 as production in Seria and Jerudong continued.

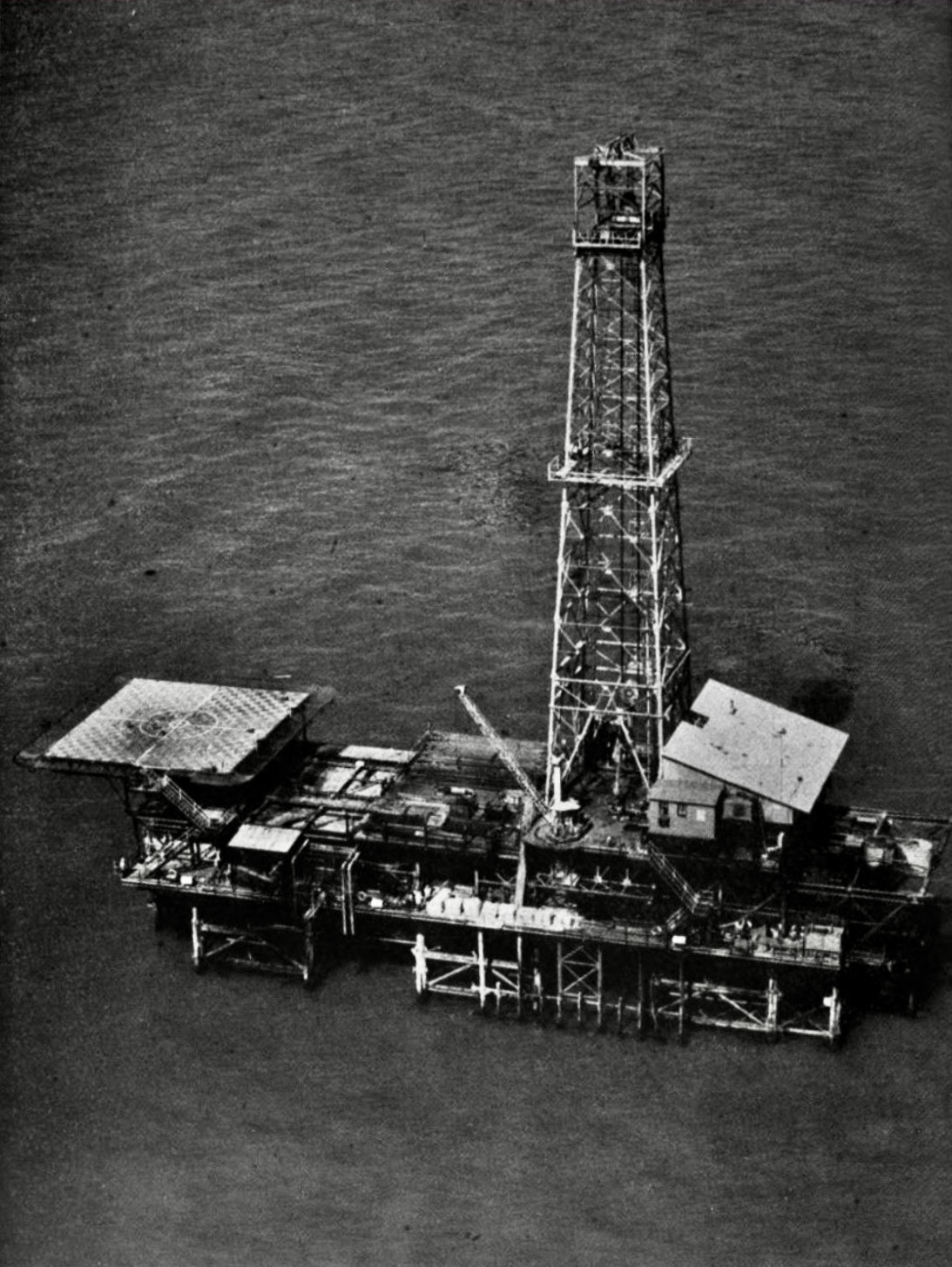
BSP's Marine Platform "G" located off Seria coast in 1958

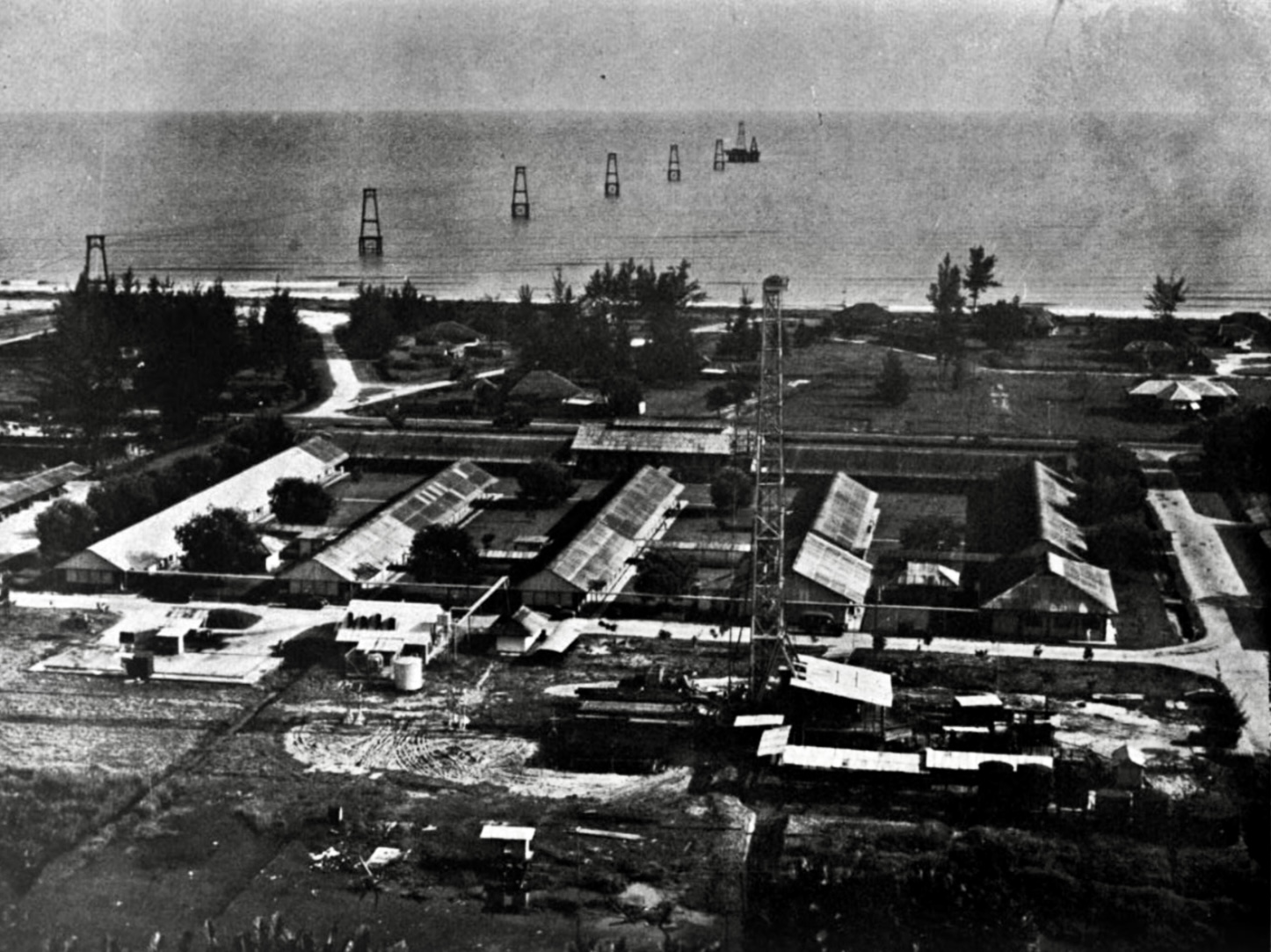
BMPC head office in 1956

The Brunei Shell Petroleum (BSP) was reorganised and registered in Brunei in 1957 following the implementation of the Brunei Companies Enactment on 1 January of that year. On 15 March 1957, it officially took over operations from its sister company, the BMPC. (Note: This resulted from a joint venture between the Royal Dutch/Shell Group and the government of Brunei.) The new name was chosen to reflect the scope of oil development, particularly on Brunei’s continental shelf. It was felt that a new company should align with the state under the new legislation, and Sultan Omar Ali Saifuddien III approved the inclusion of the name "Brunei" in the company's name. Furthermore, given the company's affiliation with the Royal Dutch-Shell Group, it was important to incorporate "Shell" to highlight its connection to the global operations of Royal Dutch-Shell. Its exploration area extended from Seria to Labi, Tutong, and Brunei Town after BSP assumed operations from BMPC. During the 1962 Brunei revolt, BSP oil installations were the focus of the TNKU rebels' coordinated attacks on government buildings and police stations around the protectorate and in the oil town of Seria. In 1963, BSP exchanged earlier concessions with limited output for new ones, covering about 4,000 square kilometres (1,500 sq mi) of the continental shelf and an extra 680 square kilometres of the Seria oil field were included in these new concessions.

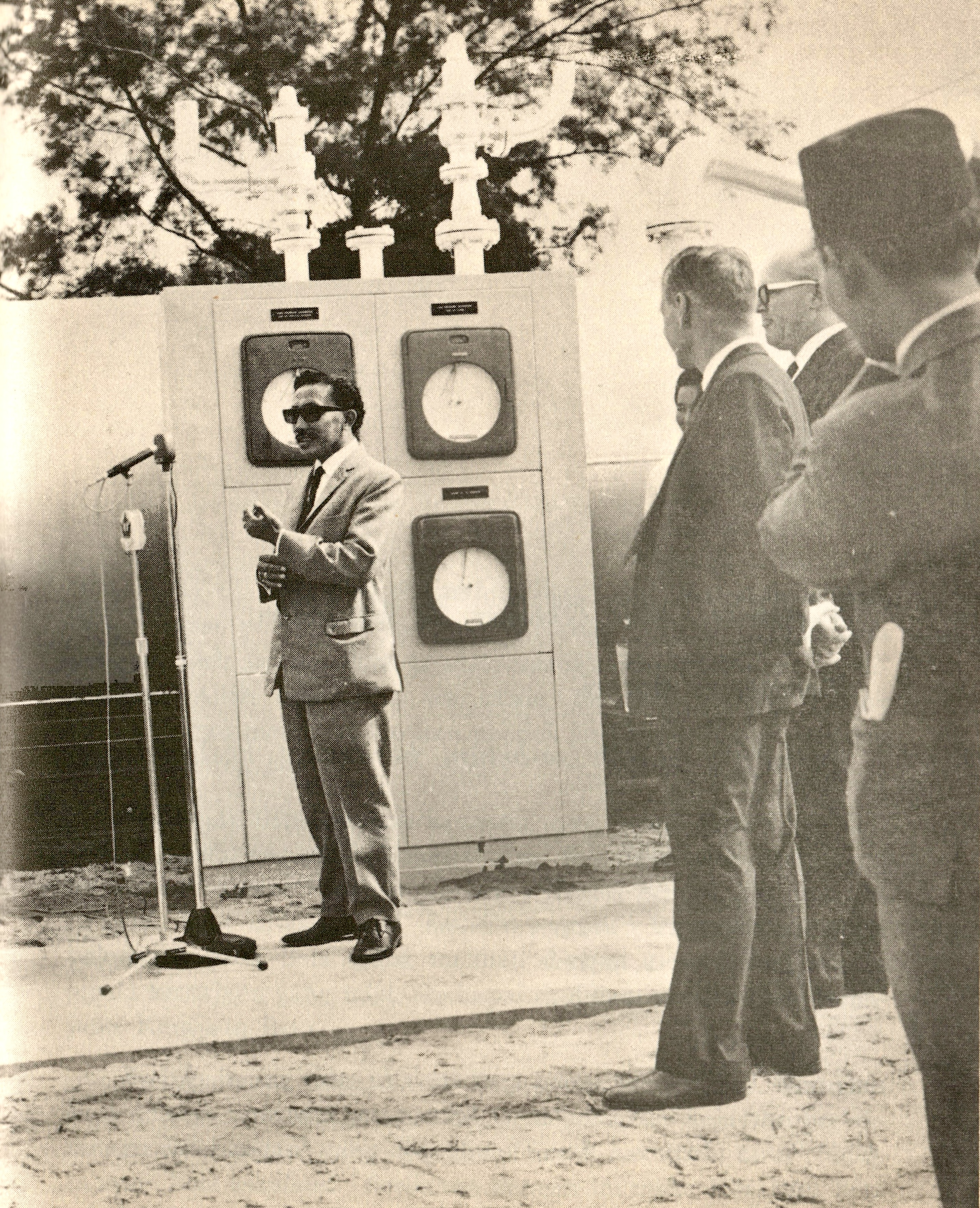
Omar Ali Saifuddien speaking during an oil pipeline's formal opening ceremony in Kuala Belait, 1964

BSP's insights into oil discoveries are thought to have influenced Omar Ali Saifuddien's stance on Malaysia, and unresolved questions over Brunei's oil economy with the Federation of Malaya contributed to his decision to reject joining in 1963, a choice that defined the nation's economic and political independence. While Omar Ali Saifuddien was meeting the Malayan government in Kuala Lumpur, BSP sent him a telegram reporting a major commercial discovery at Southwest Ampa Field. BSP expressed the view that joining Malaysia could merge Brunei's control over its oil resources with the Federation. According to B.A. Hamzah, the telegram was intended to sway Omar Ali Saifuddien to remain outside Malaysia. In 1966, concerns arose that Omar Ali Saifuddien might retaliate against British actions by denying concessions to Shell or withdrawing Brunei's sterling reserves from the Bank of England. At the same time, the British government benefited from substantial profits from BSP, while Brunei retained significant reserves in London. In 1968, BSP obtained a further offshore concession that included 298 square kilometres close to Labi and 3,735 square kilometres, some of which extended beyond the continental shelf.

The Seria Crude Oil Terminal was inaugurated on 5 June 1972 by Sultan Hassanal Bolkiah. In 1973, the Brunei government acquired a 25% stake in BSP, and in 1975, it formalised a 50-50 joint venture with the Royal Dutch Shell Group to jointly develop and exploit the country's hydrocarbon resources.

By 1981, BSP had expanded its offshore concessions by an additional 3,530 square kilometres (1,360 sq mi) to retain its interests in Brunei. Security for Shell's operations was supported by a battalion of British Gurkha troops stationed in the country, with Brunei covering their expenses, thereby reducing costs for Britain, although the government denied any direct connection between defence arrangements and Shell's concessions. The Brunei Shell Refinery was commissioned in 1983 by Crown Prince Al-Muhtadee Billah. Following a decline in oil prices in 1985, Japanese buyers sought a review of Brunei’s long-term contracts. In the same year, the Brunei government increased its stake in BSP to 50%, enhancing state involvement in the industry. By 1989, citing limited personnel, the government chose not to establish a state oil corporation but continued to expand its stake in BSP to strengthen its role in the national energy sector.

The Petroleum Unit, under the Prime Minister's Office, was responsible for in shaping policies on production, conservation, and pricing, while also overseeing BSP companies through board representation. In early 1993, the Brunei Oil and Gas Authority was established under the Minister of Finance and Economy, taking over some of the Petroleum Unit's responsibilities, including setting output levels and granting concession rights. By 1997, BSP held concessions covering 10,107 square kilometres, 73% of which were offshore. Despite the presence of competitors such as Jasra–ELF (formerly Jasra Jackson), Sunray Borneo Oil Company, Superior Oil, Clark Brunei Oil, and Woods Petroleum, BSP held the majority of concessions in exploration and production. BSP became a conglomerate comprising five businesses as of 1997.

In 2001, BSP installed a 1,000-millimetre (40 in) pipeline, the largest in Borneo at the time, achieving a record lay rate of 214 joints in 24 hours. In 2002, the company awarded Technip-Coflexip a $22 million contract for the $80 million Egret oil field development. BSP exported its first Seria Light Export Blend cargo to India in 2003. Subsequent exploration led to oil discoveries in North Seria Flank in 2004, gas in the Bubut area in 2007, and first oil from the Bugan field in 2009, developed in 20 months using standardised platform designs.

In 2011, BSP discovered oil in the deepwater Geronggong prospect, around 100 kilometres offshore in 1,000 metres of water, marking its deepest offshore find. In 2014, BSP awarded Maersk Drilling a four-year contract for the jack-up rig Maersk Completer, with options to extend. In February 2017, CGG received a six-year contract to operate a processing centre in Seria for 2D, 3D, and 4D seismic data. In March 2017, Amec Foster Wheeler was awarded a five-year contract to rejuvenate BSP's South China Sea assets. In April 2017, BSP made its first onshore oil discovery in 37 years at the Layang-Layang Well in the Seria oil field. In 2025, BSP contracted Noble Corporation's 2013-built drillship, Noble Viking, for an offshore drilling campaign off Brunei, with a contract value of approximately $14 million.

== Business ventures ==
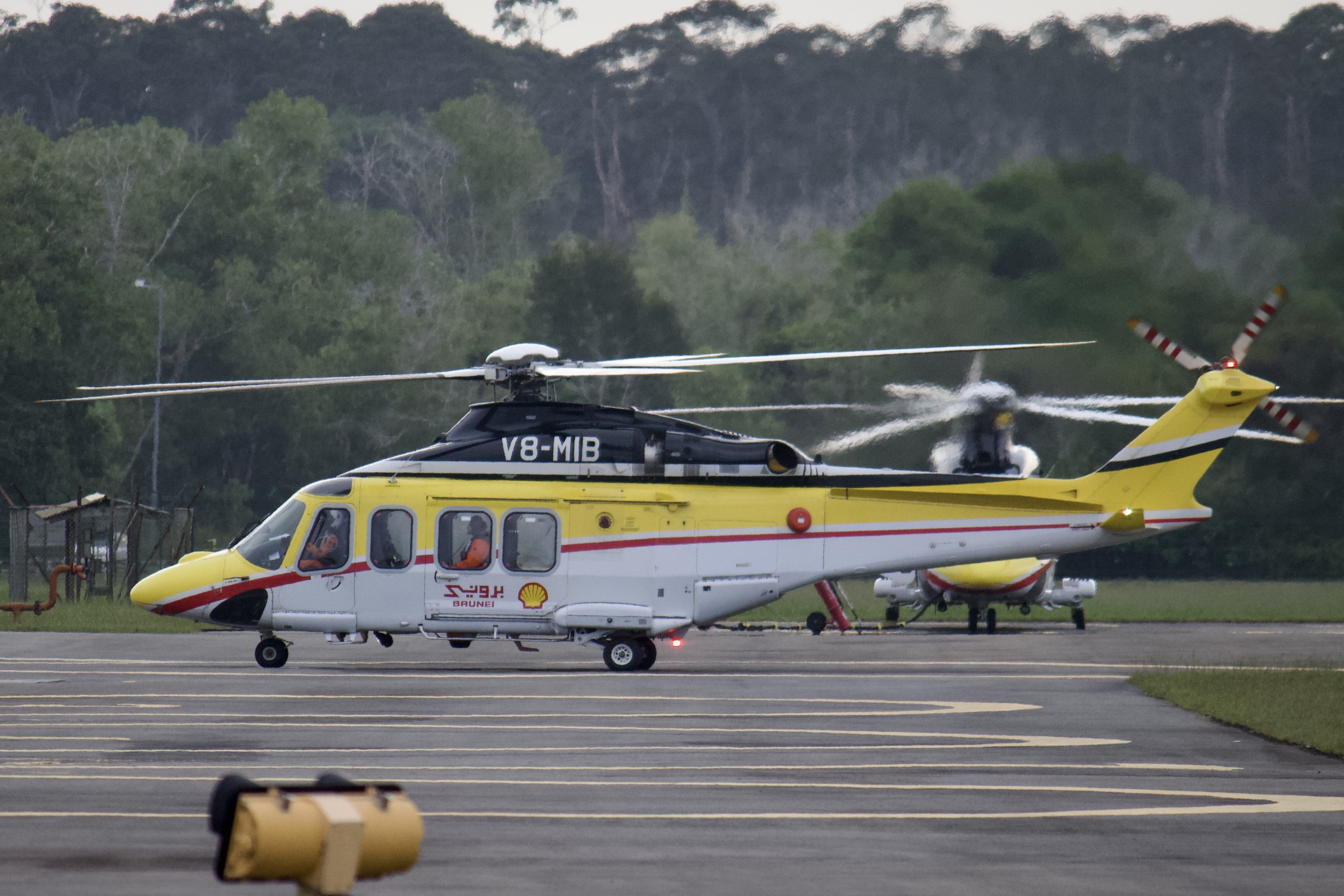
An AgustaWestland AW139, belonging to the BSP Aviation Services Department (SAV), operates from Anduki Airfield

Exploration and production of oil and LNG are handled by the primary business, BSP. Brunei Shell Marketing, formed in 1974, is responsible for selling oil and gas products within Brunei, with ownership equally divided between the Brunei government and BSP. The LNG trade with Japan is the primary function of the other three businesses, Brunei Shell Tankers (BST), Brunei Coldgas (BCG), and Brunei LNG. Established in 1969, BLNG is a joint venture consisting of 25% BSP, 25% Mitsubishi Corporation, and 50% Bruneian government. In a similar vein, the Bruneian government owns 50% of BCG, which was established in 1977 to manage LNG marketing, while BSP and Mitsubishi each control a third. BST, founded in December 1986 and equally owned by BSP and the Bruneian government, manages the shipping of LNG to Japan.

=== Brunei Gas Carriers ===
In the 1960s, significant gas reserves were discovered beneath the waters of Brunei, representing a major development for the nation’s energy sector. To capitalise on this discovery, a large-scale liquefaction plant was constructed, enabling the export of LNG, which contributed to Brunei’s economic growth. LNG transportation commenced in 1972 with the first shipment to Japan, carried by the SS Gadinia (later renamed as Bebatik), one of seven G-class ships operated by Shell Tankers UK. Between October 1972 and October 1975, the first four carriers were delivered, each with a maximum storage capacity of approximately 75,000 to 77,000 cubic metres (2,600,000 to 2,700,000 cu ft).

In 1986, Brunei Shell Tankers (BST) was established to manage the fleet of seven French-built G-class LNG carriers, later renamed after local fish and shellfish: Bebatik, Bekalang, Bekulan, Belais, Belanak, Bilis, and Bubuk. This initiated the B-class fleet era, which spanned 46 years and was used in Brunei’s export-oriented energy sector. The era concluded in 2018 with the retirement of the final vessel, Bebatik, which was part of Brunei's LNG operations.

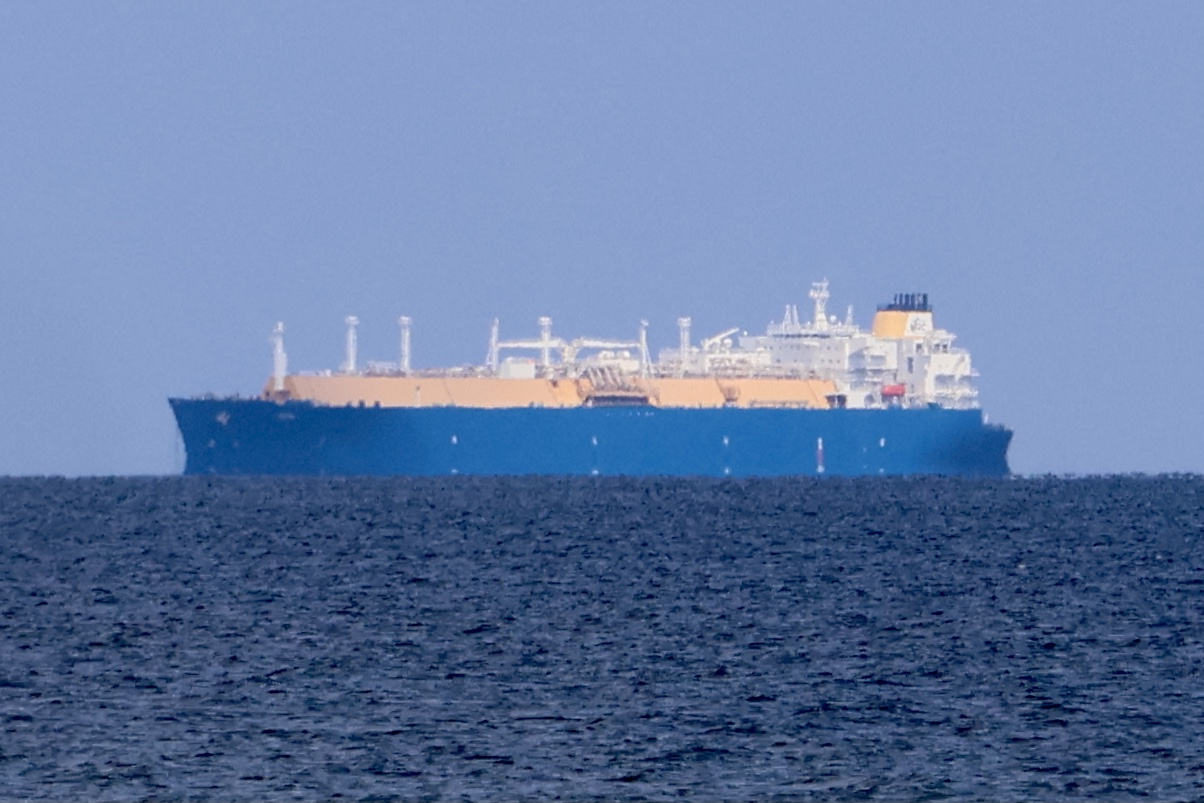
Arkat at sea off Lumut in 2023

Brunei Gas Carriers (BGC) was established in 1998 as a joint venture involving Shell Gas BV, Diamond Gas Carriers BV, Hassanal Bolkiah, and the government of Brunei. BGC made its first LNG delivery in 2002 and gradually replaced BST with new vessels. This included the deployment of four A-class ships (Amadi, Amani, Amali, and Arkat) with capacities ranging from 137,000 to 154,800 cubic metres. These ships have been used to deliver LNG to international clients, particularly in the Asia–Pacific region.

Since its founding, Brunei Gas Carriers (BGC) has completed over 7,000 LNG cargo deliveries. The management of Brunei's LNG fleet is overseen by a team of local BGC staff and Shell International Trading and Shipping Company employees. In 2011, BGC established its own fleet management department to enable independent operations. On 24 June 2019, BGC received its document of compliance, becoming the first Bruneian deepwater shipping company to operate its own fleet.

=== Brunei LNG ===
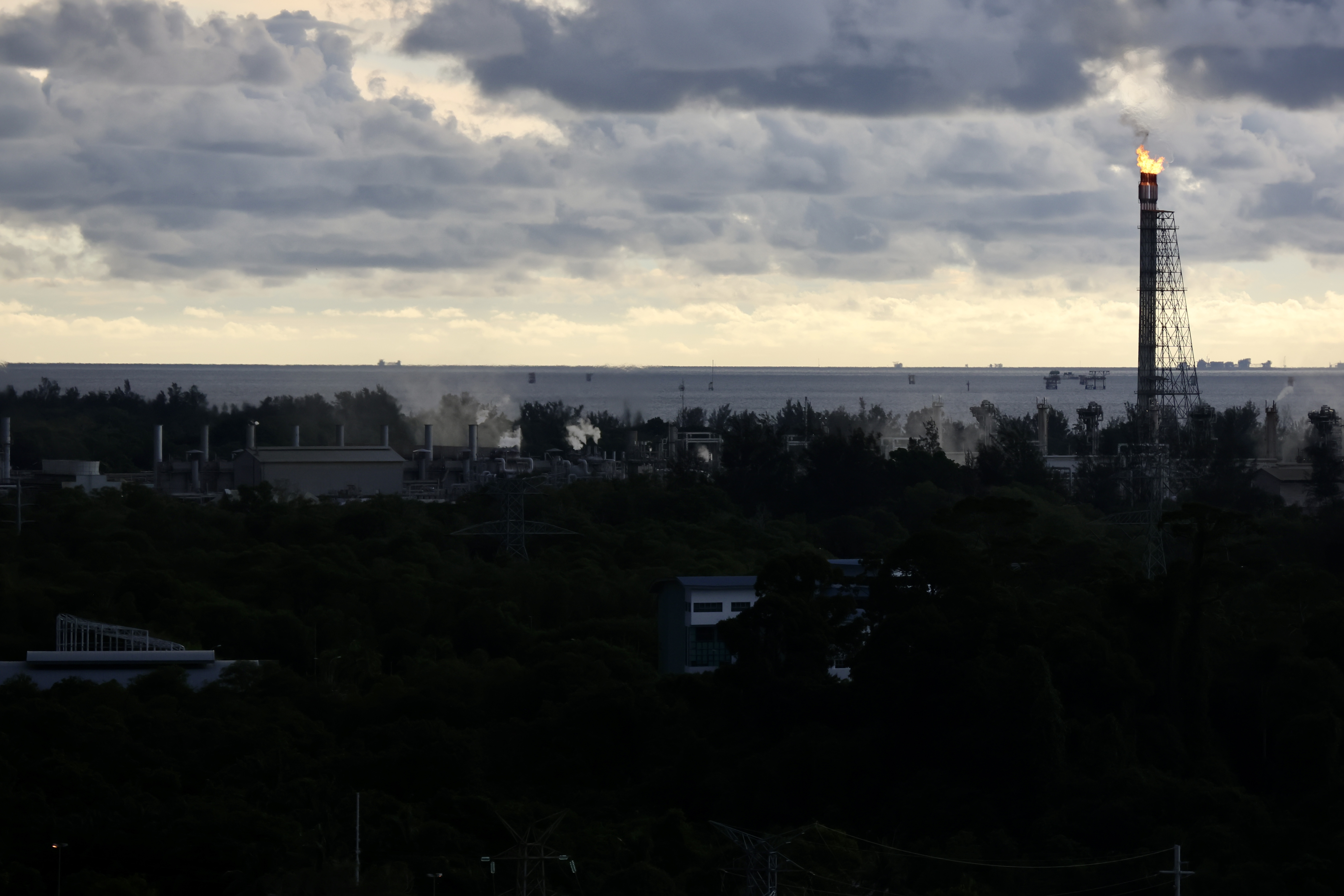
BLNG's plant in Lumut, 2024

In 1969, the government, Shell, and Mitsubishi Corporation formed Brunei LNG as a joint venture. Over time, the government increased its stake to 50%. The construction and operation of the Lumut LNG facility, completed in 1973, was intended to export LNG to Japan. The facility was built with assistance from Brunei Shell, Air Products and Chemicals, and Nippon LNG KK, reflecting international cooperation. It was constructed at an estimated cost of B$600 million and includes a 4.5-kilometre (2.8 mi) dock with stainless steel tubes for gas transportation and a water purification system. With the exception of the Gurkha security forces, the enterprise requires funding and employs around 100 individuals.

=== Brunei Shell Marketing ===
Brunei Shell Marketing (BSM) was founded in 1974 to distribute oil and gas products within Brunei and is jointly owned by the government and Shell, with its headquarters located in Bandar Seri Begawan. The company offers a variety of products, including gasoline, aviation fuel, diesel oil, lubricants, butane gas cylinders, and certain chemical products such as insecticides and detergents. As the sole authorised distributor of petroleum products in the state, BSM has reported sales growth alongside the increase in motor vehicle numbers in Brunei. The company operates 21 petrol stations across the country, all supplied by its network, with fuel prices regulated by the government. High-octane petrol and diesel are imported from Singapore and stored in tanks at Muara Port, which also supplies oil and petrol to riverine stations along the Brunei and Temburong rivers. Additionally, BSM provides aviation fuels for the international airport in Bandar Seri Begawan and fuels for the main electricity generating plant in Gadong.

== Community initiatives ==
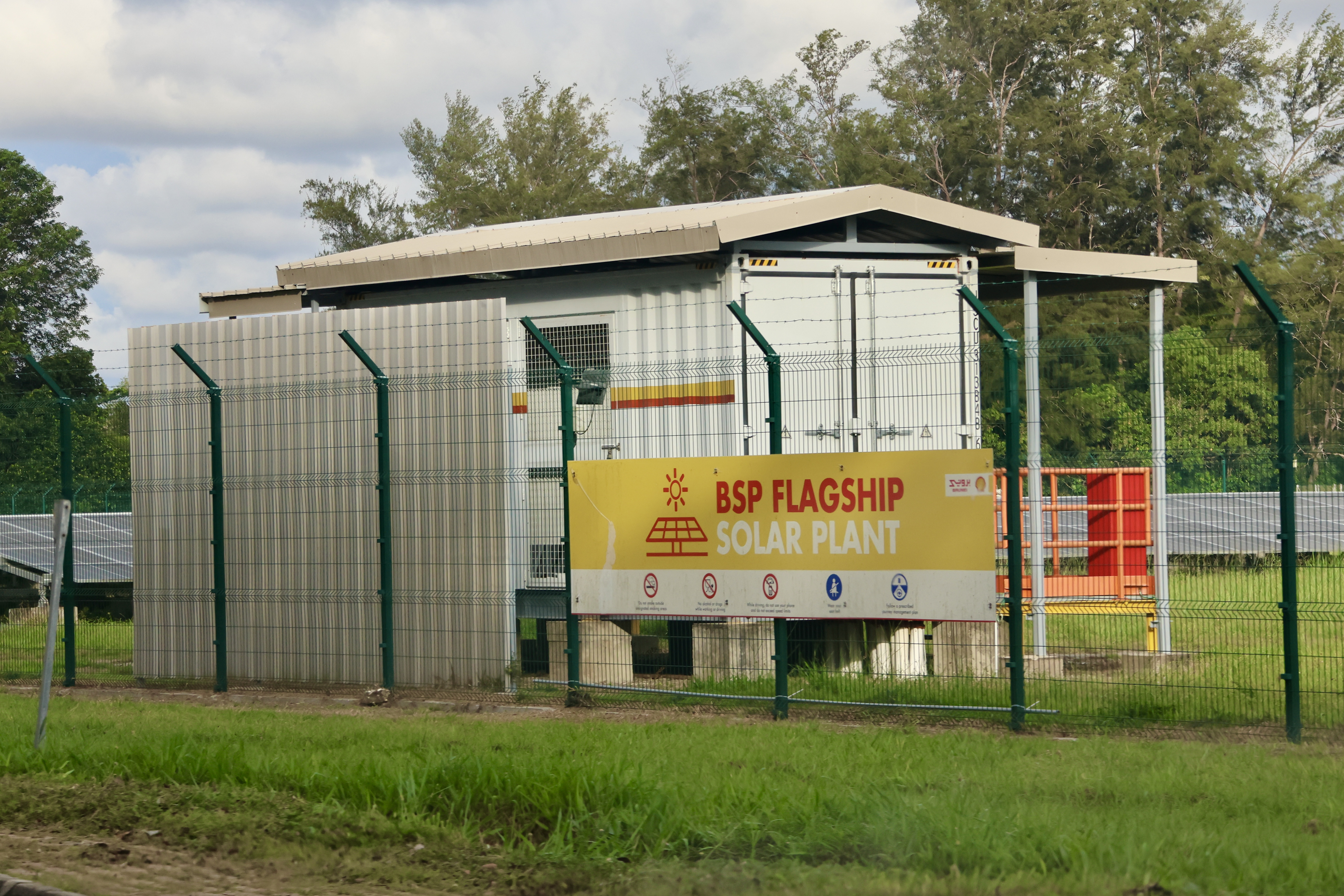
BSP Flagship Solar Plant in 2024

In addition to contributing to Brunei’s economy through oil production, the BMPC was involved in developing infrastructure in the Belait District, particularly in Seria and Kuala Belait. Like its predecessor, BSP continues to contribute to Brunei's economy. Shell also contributes to national revenue and is the second-largest employer in Brunei, after the government sector. As a result, Brunei is sometimes referred to as a "Shell State" because of the close relationship between the government and Shell.

The Brunei Shell Recreation Club was established in 1946, the Kuala Belalong Field Studies Centre in 1991, the Billionth Barrel Monument in 1991, the Anduki Recreation Park in 1992, the Outward Bound Brunei Darussalam in 1993, the Oil and Gas Discovery Centre in 2002, the BSP Flagship Solar Plant in 2021, and the Brunei Energy Hub in 2023 are examples of community projects undertaken or sponsored by BSP.

The Brunei Shell Joint Venture (BSJV) Scholarship Scheme, established in 1972, aims to provide educational opportunities for Bruneian students and offers scholarships for those pursuing undergraduate studies after completing their A-levels or the International Baccalaureate Diploma.

== See also ==
- Oil and natural gas in Brunei

== Bibliography ==
- Barrault, Michèle (1998). Brunei Darussalam: Regards. Editions Michel Hetier. ISBN 978-2-908547-29-0.
- Chanin, Eileen (2014). Limbang Rebellion: Seven Days in December 1962. Pen & Sword. ISBN 978-1-78346-191-2.
- Chia, Siow Yue; Cheng, Bifan (1989). ASEAN-China Economic Relations: Developments in ASEAN and China. Institute of Southeast Asian. ISBN 978-981-3035-31-7.
- Cleary, Mark; Wong, Shuang Yann (1994). Oil, Economic Development and Diversification in Brunei Darussalam (1st ed.). Springer Nature. doi:10.1007/978-1-349-23485-1. ISBN 978-1-349-23485-1.
- Global FDI Reports (29 July 2024). "Focus on Brunei Gas Carriers". Invest Brunei Darussalam. Archived from the original on 16 July 2025.
- Horton, A. V. M. (2005). "Colonial Office Correspondence Relating To Brunei 'destroyed Under Statute' 1906–1934" (PDF). International Journal of Asia Pacific Studies. 1. Penerbit Universiti Sains Malaysia: 1–49. ISSN 1823-6243.
- Leifer, Michael (2013). Dictionary of the Modern Politics of Southeast Asia. Routledge. ISBN 978-1-135-12938-5.
- Nani Suryani Abu Bakar (2006). "A Historical Overview of Brunei's Economy before the Discovery of Oil and Some Subsequent Issues" (PDF). Southeast Asia. 7 (1). Universiti Brunei Darussalam: 89–103.
- Singh, D. S. Ranjit; Sidhu, Jatswan S. (1997). Historical Dictionary of Brunei Darussalam. Scarecrow Press. ISBN 9780810832763.
- Symaco, Lorraine Pe; Hayden, Martin, eds. (2024). International Handbook on Education in Southeast Asia. Springer International Handbooks of Education. Springer Nature. doi:10.1007/978-981-16-8136-3. ISBN 978-981-16-8136-3.
