= Lake tanker =

Small shallow-draft tanker ship

- An unidentified Lake tanker

General characteristics
- Type: Shallow-draft tanker ships
- Tonnage: Up to 5,000

Lake tankers were small (up to 5,000 ton) specially designed shallow-draft tanker ships that carried the crude oil, pumped from beneath Lake Maracaibo in Venezuela, to the three off-shore refineries located on the Dutch islands of Aruba and Curaçao.

== Background ==
The crude obtained from Lake Maracaibo was processed at refineries located at Aruba and Curaçao, Netherlands West Indies. Aruba had two refineries, Lago Oil and Transport Company, owned by Standard Oil of New Jersey and Eagle Petroleum Company, a subsidiary of Royal Dutch Shell. There was also a Royal Dutch Shell refinery on the island of Curaçao. The Lago refinery housed the officers and their families in Lago Colony, a community owned by the company which housed all their foreign staff employees.

All three refineries depended on a fleet of "Lake Tankers" to supply the crude to be refined, carried from Lake Maracaibo through the shallow cannel between it and the Caribbean Sea. This shallow passage prevented larger oceanic tanker ships from entering the lake, and thus the need for the smaller Lake tanker.

== Description ==
The Lake Tanker was a small vessel in comparison with the larger ocean-going oil tankers; it had a trunk deck hull with a very shallow draft and a flat bottom, which allowed the ship to maneuver over the ever shifting sand bars that blocked the channel going into Lake Maracaibo.

== History ==
The first Lake Tankers (SS Invercorrie, SS Inverampton, (Note: Inverampton is also mentioned as Inverhampton in some sources.) and SS Francunion) were built in England around 1923, entering service in 1924. These were followed in 1926 by 4 ships of the Invercaibo class, significantly larger than the former. Subsequent ships remained small until after World War II when, with the dredging of the channel to Lake Maracaibo, the lake tankers became larger.

This collection of small tankers was known as the "Lake fleet" or the "Mosquito fleet", which peaked at more than 60 ships, either owned or chartered. This type of tanker was no longer needed after the channel from Lake Maracaibo to the sea was finally dredged and deepened to allow ocean-going tankers to enter the lake, and pipelines from the lake were constructed to deep water ports in the Paraguana Peninsula.

The last Lake Tanker, SS Trujillo, was retired from service in December 1954 and sailed to Jacksonville, Florida, where it joined another 12 decommissioned Lake tankers that had been active as of January 1954.

== Lake fleet ==
Some tankers that have been part of the "Lake fleet" are listed below.

=== Lago Oil fleet ===
- SS Invercorrie
- SS Inverampton
- SS Francunion
- SS Oranjestad
- SS Ambrosio
- SS Bachaquero (Note: In 1940 Bachaquero was requisitioned by the Royal Navy and converted to a Maracaibo-class LST. She was decommissioned in 1945.)
- SS Invercaibo
- SS Hooiberg
- SS Invergoil
- SS Punta Gorda
- SS San Carlos
- SS Tia Juana
- SS Yamanota
- SS Pedernales
- SS Andino
- SS Quiriquire
- SS Misoa (Note: In 1940 Misoa was requisitioned by the Royal Navy and converted to a Maracaibo-class LST. She was decommissioned in 1945.)
- SS Cumarebo
- SS Maracay
- SS Boscan
- SS Caripito
- SS Guarico
- SS Temblador
- SS Amacuro
- SS Mara
- SS Trujillo

=== Shell Oil fleet ===
- SS Adela
- SS Alicia
- SS Asiento
- SS Berta
- SS Brigida
- SS Carlota
- SS Casandra
- SS Chepita
- SS Conchita
- SS Dolium
- SS Elena
- SS Felipa
- SS Frasca
- SS Gadinia
- SS Galeomma
- SS Ganesella
- SS Gari
- SS Gastrana
- SS Gaza
- SS Gemma
- SS Gena
- SS Genota
- SS Geomitra
- SS Glebula
- SS Glessula
- SS Gomphina
- SS Gouldia
- SS Gyrotoma
- SS Josefina
- SS Juanita
- SS Juliana
- SS Julieta
- SS Justina
- SS Laura
- SS Leona
- SS Leonor
- SS Leticia
- SS Lidia
- SS Linda
- SS Liria
- SS Liseta
- SS Lucia
- SS Lucita
- SS Lucrecia
- SS Luisa
- SS Manuela
- SS Mariana
- SS Mariquita
- SS Marsella
- SS Martica
- SS Martina
- SS Maruja
- SS Matilde
- SS Maximina
- SS Rafaela
- SS Ramona
- SS Rebeca
- SS Renata
- SS Rita
- SS Rodas
- SS Rosa
- SS Rosalia
- SS Rosaura
- SS Rufina
- Shell Aramare
- Shell Caricuao
- Shell Charaima
- Shell Dezoito
- Shell Manaure
- Shell Mara
- Shell Murachi
- Shell Naiguata
- Shell Plata
- SS Shellphalte
- SS Shellspra
- SS Spramex
- SS Susana

=== British American Oil fleet ===
(see British-American Oil)

- B/A Peerless
- B/A Canada
