= Egret oil field, Brunei =

Offshore oil field in Brunei

Egret
- Location within Brunei
- Country: Brunei
- Region: Belait
- Offshore/onshore: Offshore
- Coordinates: 4.98722°N 114.205505°E
- Operators: Brunei Shell Petroleum
- Service contractors: Technip-Coflexip

Field history
- Discovery: 1971
- Start of production: 2006
- Peak year: 2006

Production
- Peak of production (oil): 1,350,000,000 barrels per day (~6.73×10^{10} t/a)
- Peak of production (gas): 390,000,000,000 million cubic feet per day (1.1×10^{10}×10^{6} m^{3}/d)

Egret oil field, also known as Egret Field, is a complex oil and gas field in the South China Sea and 45 km north-west of Seria, Belait District, Brunei. It is located at the depth of 60 m, and operated by Brunei Shell Petroleum (BSP).

== History ==
The oil field was first discovered in 1971, but was deemed non-commercial. Moreover, it was predicted that the oil field would produce an estimated 30 million barrels for 15–20 years. In order to supply the Brunei LNG plant in Lumut, a US$79 million development of the Egret field was planned by the BSP in November 2001 and 2002. The Phase 1 project was planned to be completed by August 2003 (at the cost of US$ 22 million), while Phase 2 was predicted to be in 2006, with the development probably costing US$ 79 million. It was not until 2006, the extraction of oil and gas began. The EGDP-01 platform was put in the field and the gases would then be carried by pipelines to the Brunei LNG plant, via South West Ampa gas field.

== Platforms ==
- EGDP-01 (Main Complex Platform)
