= Egret oil field =

Egret oil field may refer to:

- Egret oil field, Brunei
- Egret oil field, an oil field of the North Sea in the UK
