= Seria Energy Lab =

Science center in Seria, Belait, Brunei

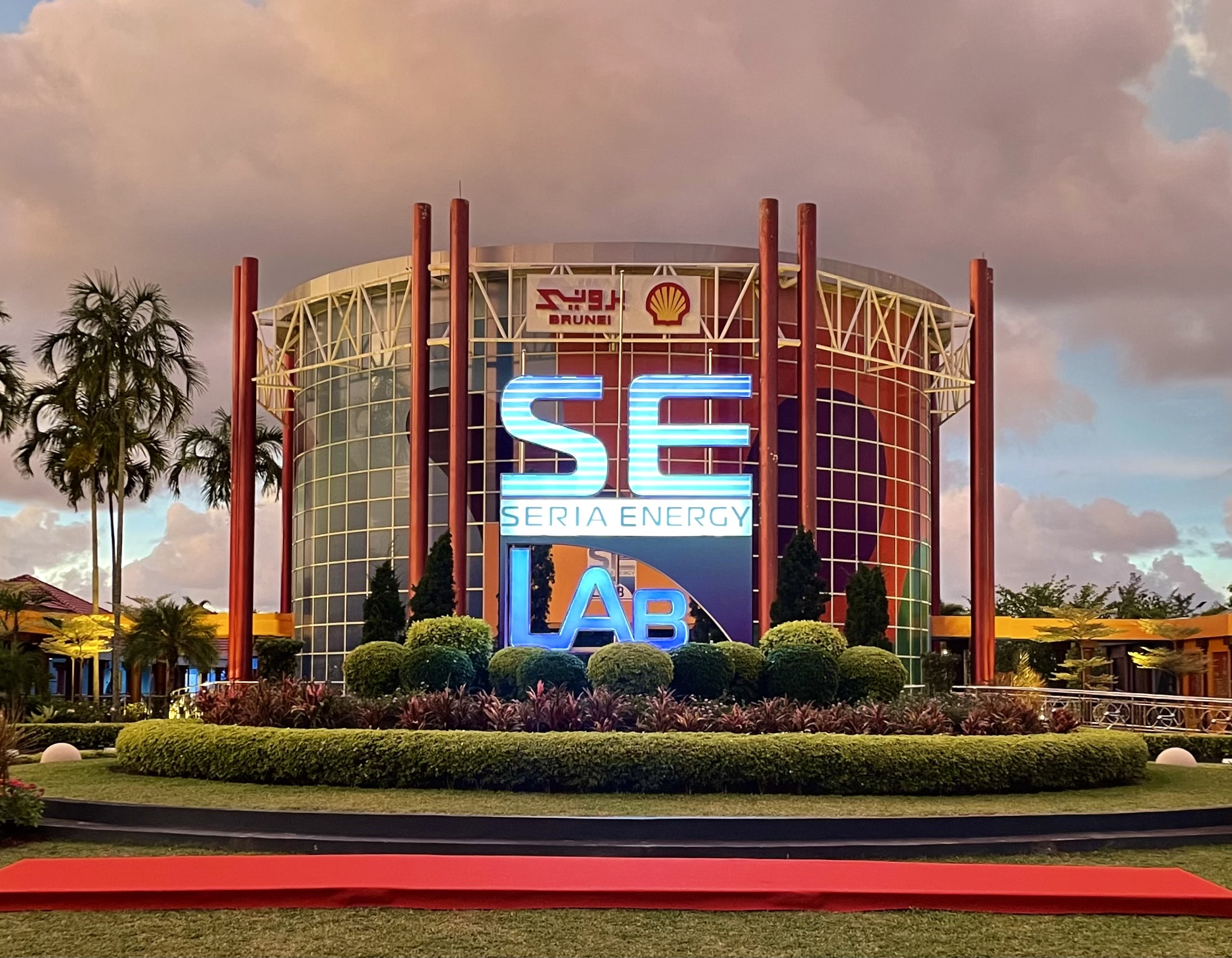
- Former name: Oil and Gas Discovery Centre
- Established: September 2002
- Location: F20 Jalan Tengah, Seria, Belait, Brunei KB3534
- Coordinates: 4.6171172°N 114.3268552°E
- Type: Science museum
- Accreditation: Asia Pacific Network of Science and Technology Centres (ASPAC)
- Head: Nur Karnina binti Karim
- Owner: Brunei Shell Petroleum
- Nearest parking: On site (no charge)
- Website: seriaenergylab.com

The Oil and Gas Discovery Centre (OGDC; Malay: Pusat Penemuan Minyak dan Gas) is a science centre in Seria, Belait District, Brunei. It was constructed near the Seria Oil Field and was rebranded Seria Energy Lab (SEL) in 2020. As BSP's flagship initiative, it aims to promote the nation's scientific literacy.

== History ==
OGDC was officiated by Sultan Hassanal Bolkiah on 14 September 2002, on the same day of the inauguration of Ampa Fairley Rationalisation Project (AFRP). The Shell Traffic Games and OGDC Traffic Games Park opened for business in 2007. The International Science Centre had its first traveling exhibition at the facility in 2012. The Asia Pacific Network of Science and Technology Centres (ASPAC) conference was arranged by the center in 2014. The institution hosted "Pesta Sains," its inaugural scientific festival, in 2018.

From 2 July 2018 until 2 May 2020, it underwent major renovation and the rebranding of its name from Oil and Gas Discovery Centre to Seria Energy Lab. To highlight its importance in the nation, the facility received a significant makeover in 2019. The center's objective has been updated to align with Wawasan Brunei 2035, which is to generate highly competent and educated citizens.

Brunei Shell Petroleum (BSP) celebrated its 90th anniversary with the construction of the Seria Energy Recreational Park. BSP seized the chance to open the solar-powered park to the public so that the people of Seria and Belait might engage in light walking and physical activity throughout the evening. The Billionth Barrel Monument is located around 5 kilometres (3.1 mi) from the park. On 6 April 2021, SEL was officially opened by Prince Al-Muhtadee Billah.

== Architecture ==
The centre consists of the main gallery, basketball court, beach soccer pit, big top, classroom, conference room, playground, science lab and theater.

== Exhibition ==
There are six exhibitions at SEL, which include Oil and Gas, Future Energy, Aqualab, Smart Science, Maker Space, and Exhibition Trials. In addition to these, there are several outdoor exhibits, such as:

- The BSP locomotive, known as 'Loko' in the past, was built around 1950. This was the only land-based transport vehicle that carried passengers from Badas to Lorong Dua, Seria, as there were no road facilities at the time. It was previously located at the Pengkalan Sungai Mau Community Hall area. The entire structure was made of steel. This train's engine was used by BSP for both company operations and for the local population in the Labi, Bukit Sawat, and Badas areas. Previously, the head and parts of this locomotive were stored and left abandoned in the timber mill area. Then, around 1990, the Belait District Officer Dani Ibrahim, and Ismail Opak made efforts to protect and preserve the locomotive, subsequently placing its parts in front of the hall in Sungai Mau.
- The oil drilling rig, used by BSP, was formerly located at the entrance to the Billionth Barrel Monument. The entire structure is made of steel. It was used by Brunei Shell Petroleum for the exploration and extraction of crude oil, starting from the initial search to the discovery of crude oil in the Labi and Kuala Belait areas.

== Gallery ==
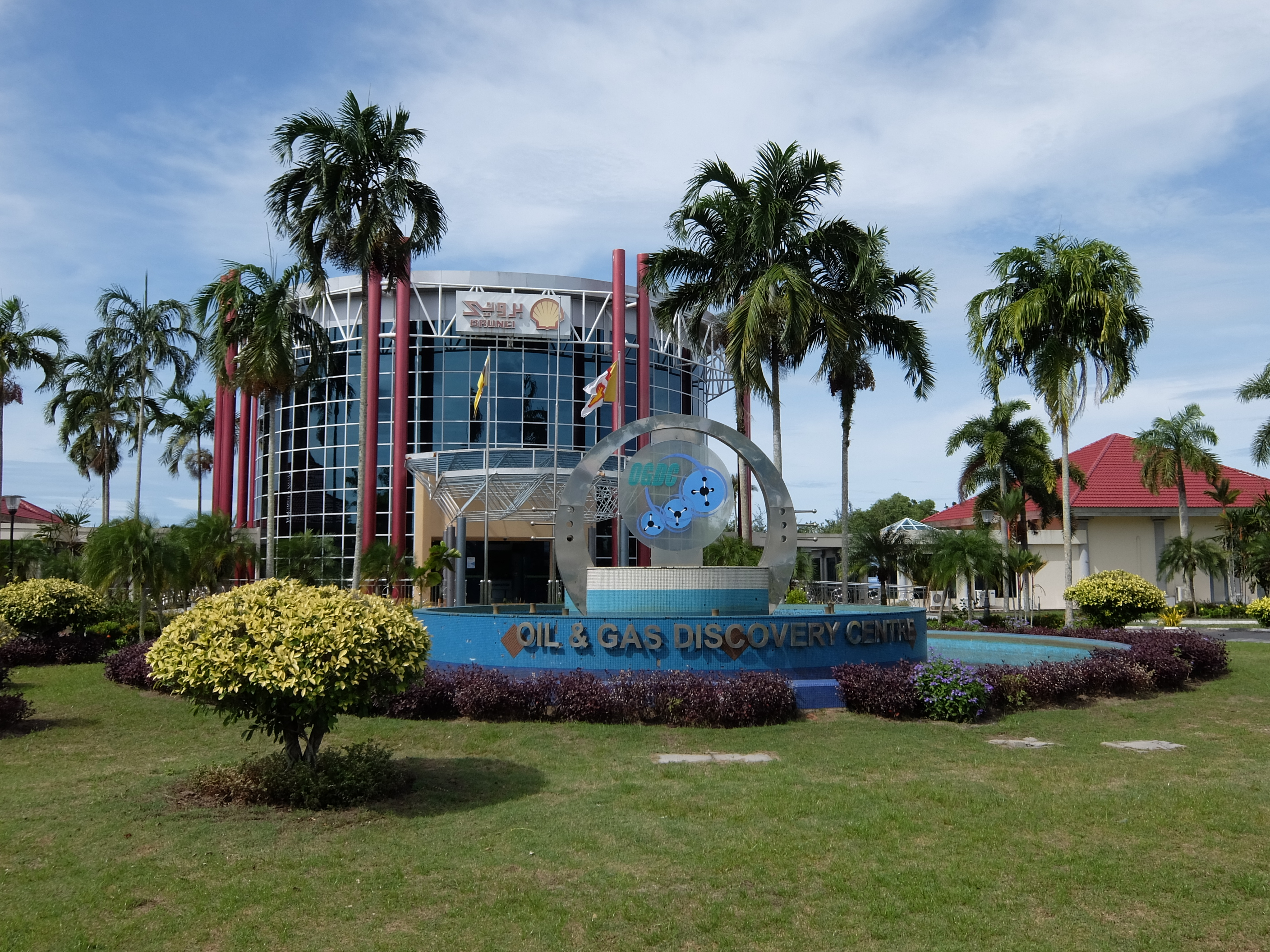
Oil and Gas Discovery Centre on 13 January 2018

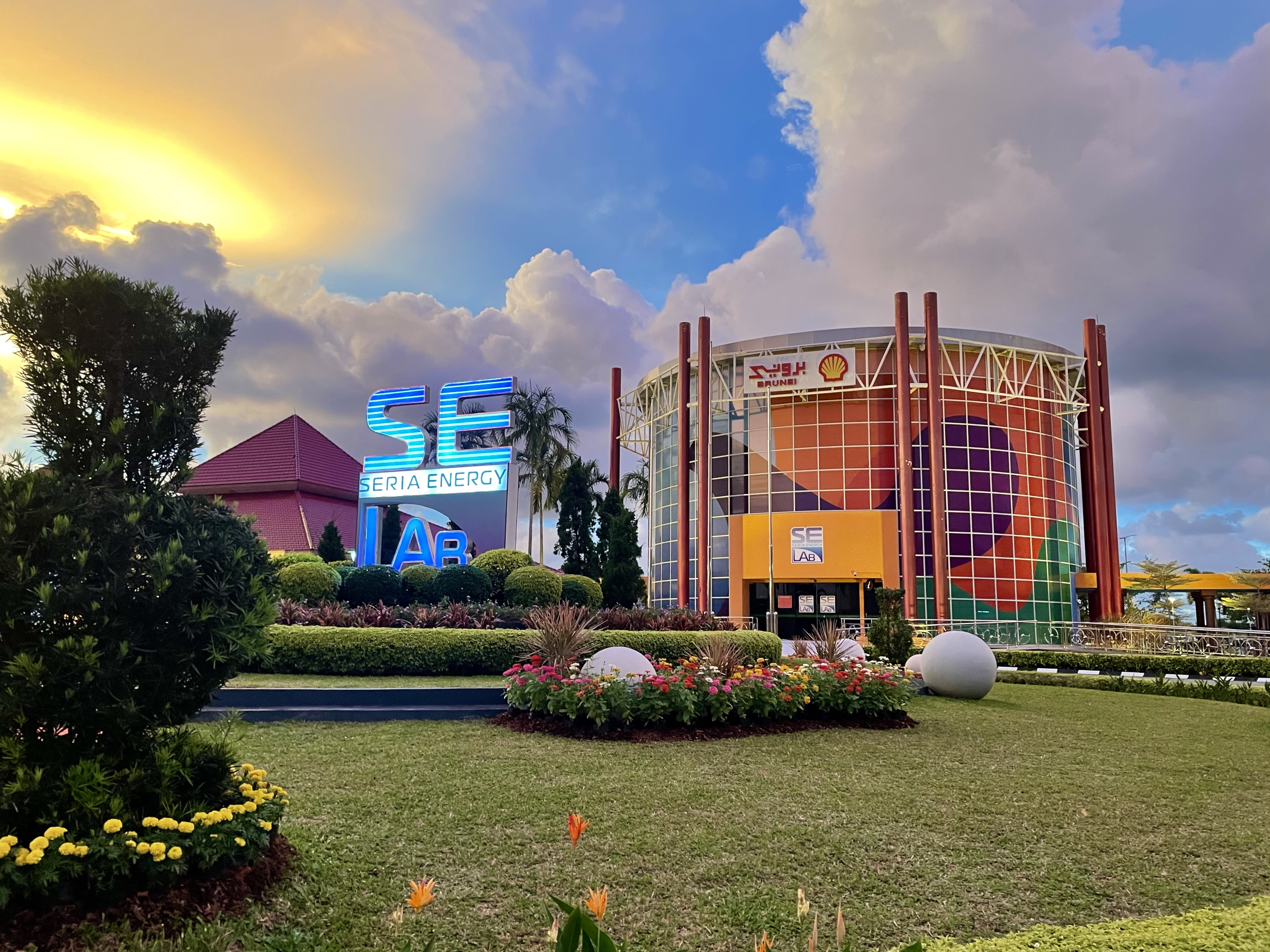
Seria Energy Lab on 4 April 2021

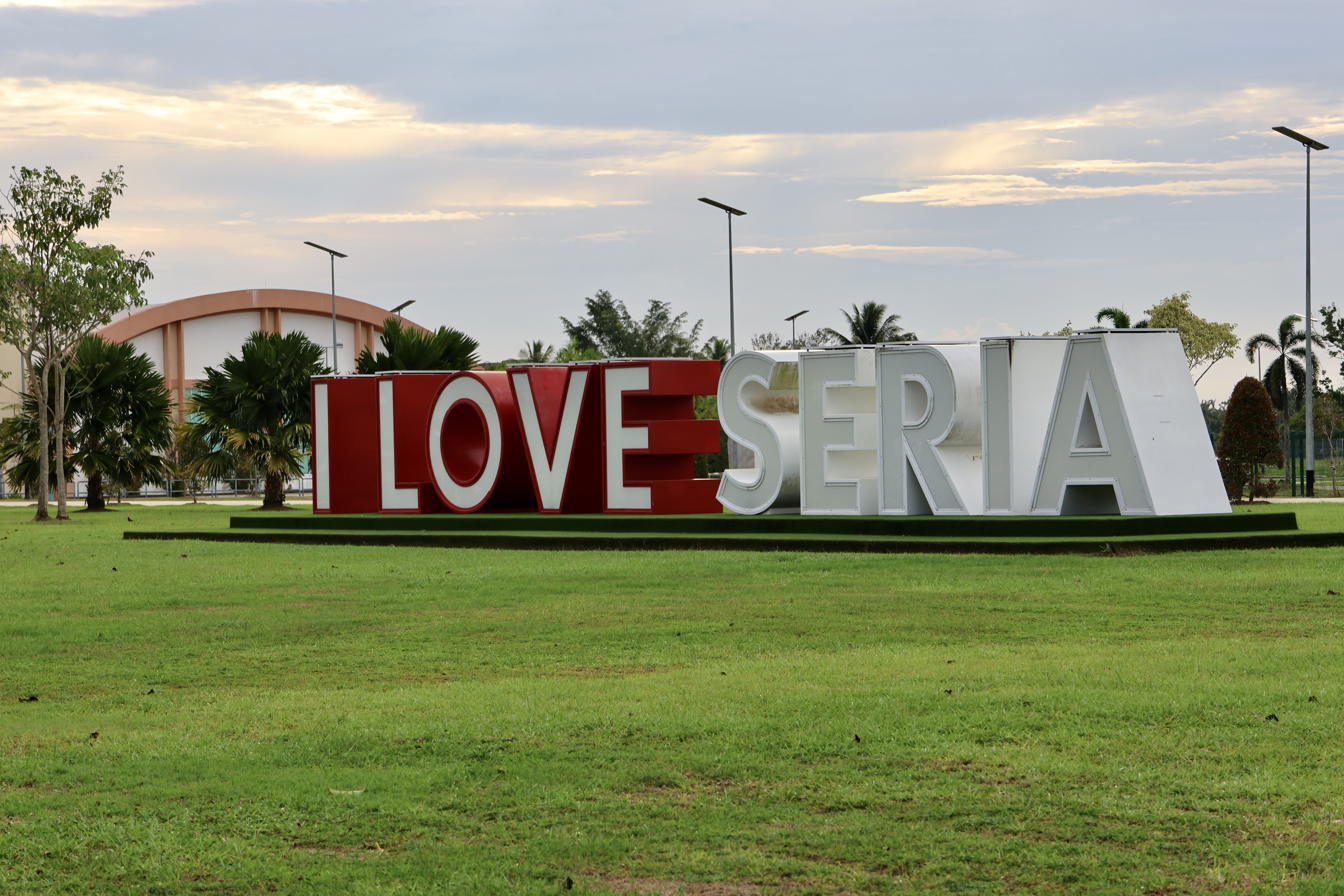
"I LOVE SERIA" sign

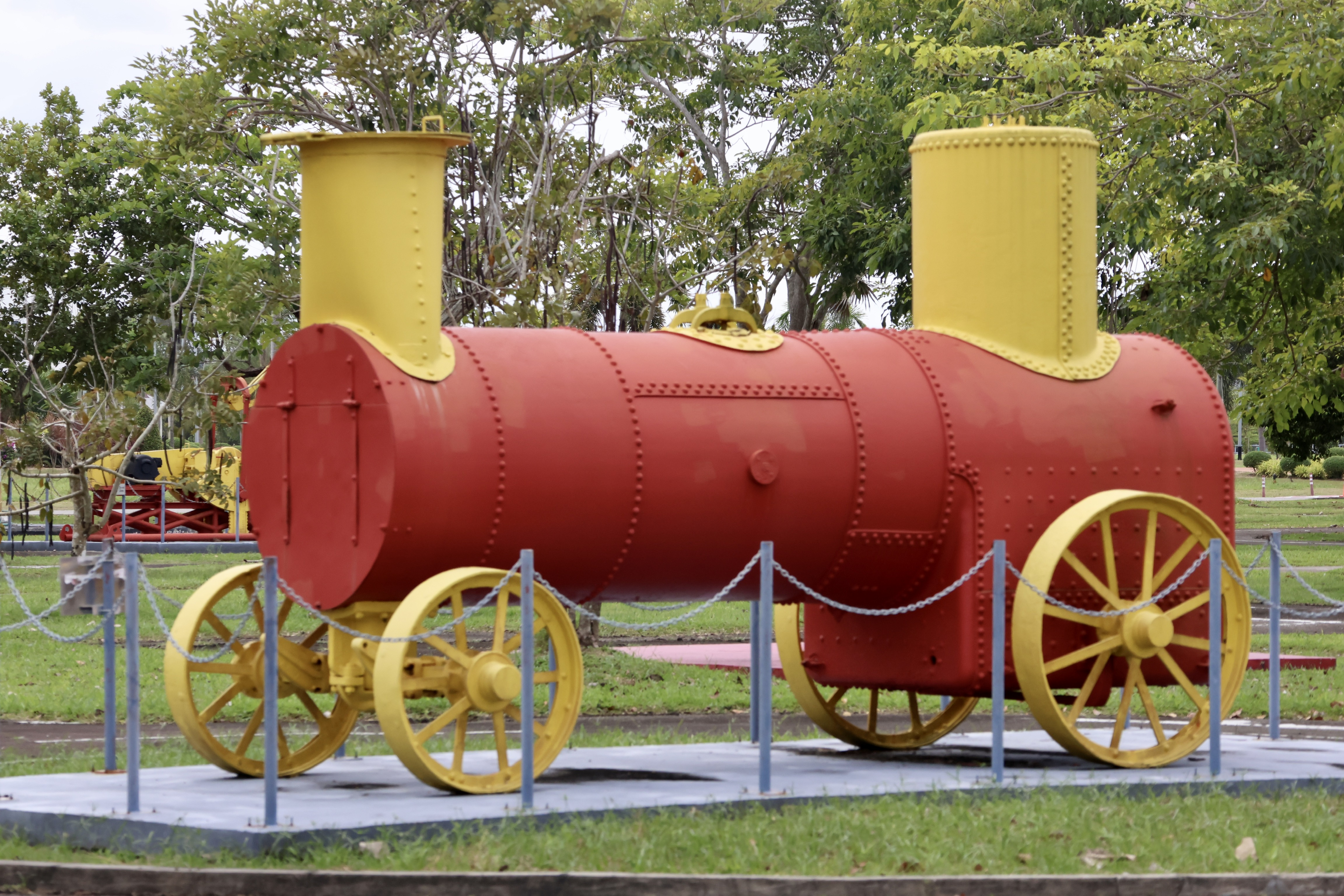
Locomotive on display

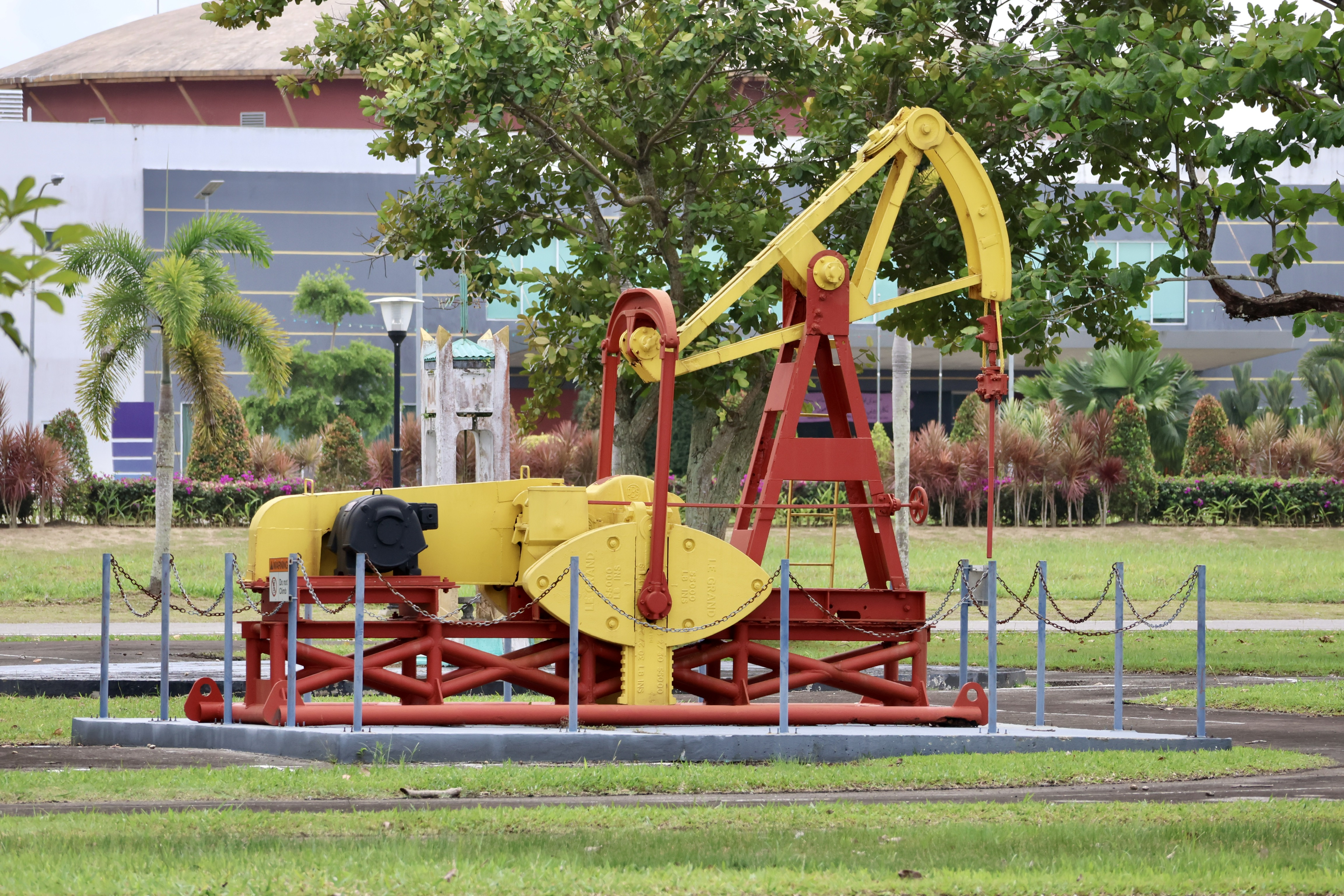
Pumpjack mechanism on display

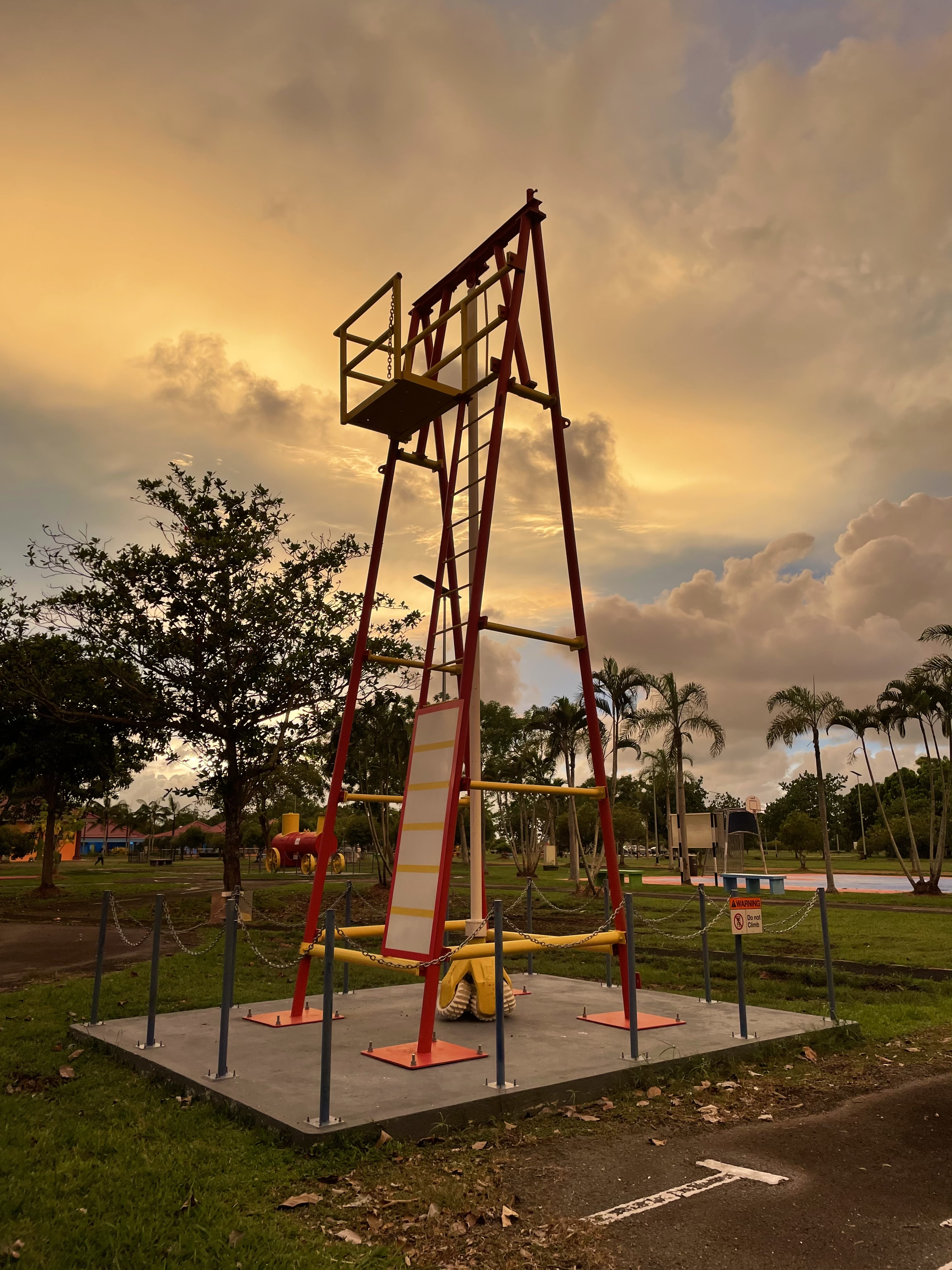
Oil drilling rig on display

== See also ==
- Tourism in Brunei
