= Brunei LNG =

Liquified natural gas company in Brunei

Coordinates: 4.6686438°N 114.4645827°E

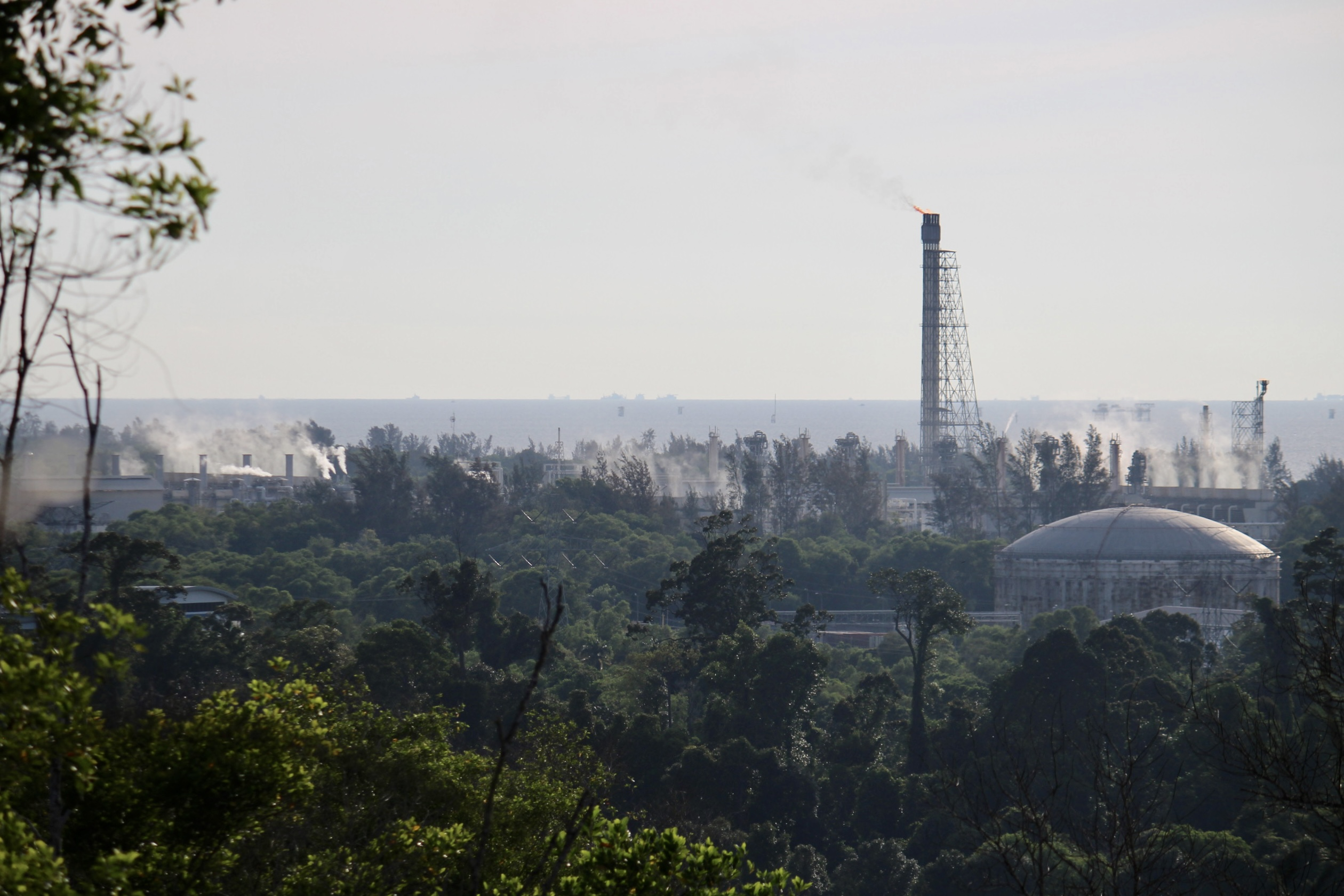
- LNG plant in 2022
- Type: LLC
- Industry: Energy
- Founded: December 1969; 56 years ago
- Headquarters: Lumut KC2935, Belait District, Brunei
- Key people: Chairman: Al-Muhtadee Billah; CEO: Adeleye Falade
- Products: Liquefied natural gas
- Owner: Government of Brunei (50%); Mitsubishi Corporation (25%); Brunei Shell Petroleum (25%)
- Website: bruneilng.co.bn

Brunei LNG (BLNG), located in Lumut, Belait District, is the largest oil and gas producer in Brunei and has been a key player in the country's energy sector since its establishment in 1969. As the fourth largest oil producer in Southeast Asia and the ninth largest liquefied natural gas (LNG) producer globally, BLNG has supplied LNG to Japan since its first shipment in 1972. The joint venture between Brunei Shell Petroleum (BSP) and Mitsubishi Corporation has also expanded into ownership of LNG carriers and deepwater upstream oil and gas exploration. BLNG has emerged as the world's longest-running commercial LNG plant.

== History ==
The company was established after the discovery of the offshore Ampa gas field in the Belait District in 1963. It was officially founded in December 1969, with the Government of Brunei, Shell Overseas Holdings, and Mitsubishi Corporation signing a joint venture agreement in January 1970. That same year, Coldgas Trading, along with Tokyo Electric Power Company, Tokyo Gas, and Osaka Gas, signed a sales and purchase agreement (SPA) with BLNG. Later in 1972, the SS Gadinia became the first ship to complete a shipment to Japan. Brunei's gas industry saw significant growth with the opening of the LNG plant in Lumut by Sultan Hassanal Bolkiah on 4 April 1973, the first facility of its kind in the Western Pacific.

Operated by BLNG, the plant is a joint venture involving Mitsubishi Corporation, the Royal Dutch Shell Group, and the Bruneian government. Natural gas sourced from offshore reservoirs owned by Brunei Shell Petroleum is refined at the LNG plant and transported to Japan using seven LNG carriers, each capable of holding 73,000 cubic metres (2,600,000 cu ft) of liquefied gas. In 1987, Brunei's average gas production increased to 885,000,000 cubic feet (25,100,000 m^{3}) feet per day, up from 842,000,000 cubic feet in 1986. The LNG plant exported 5,000,000 tonnes (4,900,000 long tons; 5,500,000 short tons) of LNG annually under a 20-year agreement with Japan, which expired in 1993. By that year, Brunei had become the fourth-largest LNG producer in the world, with approximately 34 percent of its gas reserves utilised. The LNG plant, located on over 300 acres (120 ha) near Lumut Beach, (Note: BSP and Block B Joint Venture, which consists of Total E&P Borneo BV, Shell, and Petroleum Brunei, supply natural gas to Brunei LNG's plant, which has five liquefaction trains that can process 9,700 cubic metres (340,000 cu ft) of gas per day.) has developed into a significant modern industrial complex.

In 1993, the LNG plant underwent a B$500 million renovation to extend its operational life, coinciding with the extension of the SPA with Japanese companies for an additional 20 years. The following year, BLNG was the first LNG plant to undergo significant refurbishment, replacing instrumentation and raising safety standards in its loading, storage, and liquefaction facilities. In that same year, a South Korean company signed a SPA that would take effect after 1997. By 1999, approximately $1,632 million worth of LNG had been sold to Japan.

Plans to develop the Egret gas field were officially announced in November 2001, with production expected to commence in August 2003. In 2005, BLNG made global headlines in the oil and gas sector by becoming the first LNG plant to successfully replace its primary cryogenic heat exchanger (MCHE) on-site in a live plant, a groundbreaking achievement as the MCHE—responsible for cooling natural gas to −160 °C to convert it into liquid—is the core component of every LNG plant. Additionally, the LNG plant underwent further renovations from 2004 to 2010. By 2007, Japan imported B$2 billion worth of LNG and crude oil from Brunei.

== Shareholders ==
The operating company—Brunei LNG Sdn Bhd—is owned by the Government of Brunei (50%), Shell Overseas Trading and Mitsubishi Corporation (both 25%). BLNG operates five LNG trains and produces 6.71 million tonnes every year of liquified natural gas. It has approximately 500 personnel.

The facility uses Air Products' AP-C3MR process and has three LNG storage tanks capable of holding 195,000 cubic metres (6,900,000 cu ft).

== List of MD and CEOs ==
The list of former and incurrent Managing Directors (MD) and CEOs is as follows:

- Haji Hamdillah bin Haji Abdul Wahab (2000–2005)
- Fred Smeenk (2005–2008)
- Haji Salleh Bostaman bin Haji Zainal Abidin (2008–2012)
- Mohamad bin Haji Damit (2012–2017)
- Patrice Girard (2017–2020)
- Hajah Farida binti Haji Talib (2020–2024)
- Adeleye Falade (since 3 April 2024)

== See also ==
- Oil and natural gas in Brunei
