= SS Gouldia =

Fifth ship of the B-class oil tankers

History

United Kingdom
- Name: SS Gouldia
- Owner: Gaz de France
- Port of registry: London, UK
- Ordered: 1972
- Builder: Chantiers Navals de La Ciotat, France
- Launched: 9 February 1974
- In service: 1975
- Out of service: 1986
- Homeport: London
- Fate: Sold to Brunei in December 1986.

Brunei
- Name: SS Belanak
- Owner: Brunei Shell Tankers (1986); Brunei Liquified Natural Gas (2015)
- Operator: STASCo
- Port of registry: Muara, Brunei
- Acquired: 1986
- In service: 1986
- Out of service: 28 April 2018
- Homeport: Brunei
- Identification: IMO number: 7347768; MMSI number: 508040000; Callsign: V8XE
- Fate: Scrapped in 2018

General characteristics
- Class & type: B-class oil tankers (Brunei); G-class oil tankers (France)
- Displacement: 51,579 tons
- Length: 260 m (853 ft 0 in)
- Beam: 35 m (114 ft 10 in)
- Speed: 18 knots
- Boats & landing craft carried: 2 x lifeboats

SS Belanak was the fifth ship of the seven B-class oil tankers. She was previously known as Gouldia. She is named after belanak, a species of fish found in Brunei and Malaysia.

== Development ==
B-class oil tankers were either built by CNIM-La Syne or Chantiers Navals de La Ciotat between 1972 and 1975. They served Gaz de France for around 14 years, the B-class vessels were acquired and delivered to BST in December 1986. Previously referred to as the G-class vessels chartered under Shell Tankers United Kingdom (STUK). They continued to provide reliable service to the company and its client especially BLNG. Four out of the seven BST vessels carry a fully Bruneian crew with the exception of senior management; a feat yet to be achieved but not impossible.

All B-class vessels have an average cargo capacity of 75,000 m^{3} (470,000 bbl) and were certified with the 'Green Passport' for the safe carriage of all hazardous materials on board. All B-class oil tankers were taken out of service in 2011. They are all steam powered.

== Construction and career ==
SS Gadinia was ordered in 1972 and completed in 1975. The vessel entered service in 1975 and was taken out of service to be sold in 1986. In 1986, Brunei Shell acquired Gouldia and renamed her Belanak. Throughout her career she routinely traveled between Brunei and Japan carrying oil.

On 28 April 2018, Belanak was taken out of service to be scrapped in Shanghai, China after 45 years of service. Her and her sister SS Bebatik were the last two in service.
