= SS Gadila =

Second ship of the B-class oil tankers

History

United Kingdom
- Name: SS Gadila
- Owner: Gaz De France
- Port of registry: London, UK
- Ordered: 1972
- Builder: Chantiers de l'Atlantique, France
- Launched: 13 April 1972
- In service: 1972
- Out of service: 1986
- Homeport: London
- Fate: Sold to Brunei in December 1986

Brunei
- Name: SS Bekalang
- Owner: Brunei Shell Tankers (1986); Brunei Liquified Natural Gas (2015)
- Operator: STASCo
- Port of registry: Muara, Brunei
- Acquired: 1986
- In service: 1986
- Out of service: 2011
- Homeport: Brunei
- Identification: IMO number: 7217896; MMSI number: 508060000; Callsign: V8XB
- Fate: Scrapped, in April 2011

General characteristics
- Class & type: B-class oil tankers (Brunei); G-class oil tankers (France)
- Displacement: 51,579 tons
- Length: 260 m (853 ft 0 in)
- Beam: 35 m (114 ft 10 in)
- Speed: 18 knots
- Boats & landing craft carried: 2 x lifeboats

SS Bekalang was the second ship of the seven B-class oil tankers. She was previously known as Gadila. She is named after the belakang, a species of fish found in Brunei and Malaysia.

== Development ==
B-class oil tankers were built by Chantiers de l'Atlantique, France in 1972 to 1975. They served Gaz de France for around 14 years, the B-class vessels were acquired and delivered to BST in December 1986. Previously referred to as the G-class vessels chartered under Shell Tankers United Kingdom (STUK). They continued to provide reliable service to the company and its client especially BLNG. Four out of the seven BST vessels are crewed fully by a Brunei complement with the exception of senior management.

All B-class vessels have an average cargo capacity of 75,000 m^{3} (470,000 bbl) and are certified with the 'Green Passport' for the safe carriage of all hazardous materials on board. All B-class oil tankers were taken out of service in 2011. They are all steam powered.

== Construction and career ==
SS Gadila was ordered in 1972 and completed in 1973. The ship entered service in 1973 and was taken out of service to be sold in 1986. In 1986, Brunei Shell acquired Gadila and renamed her Bekalang. Throughout her career she routinely traveled between Brunei and Japan carrying LNG (Liquefied Natural Gas). On 7 April 2011, Bekalang was delivered to Jiangyin Ship Recycling, China for scrapping.
