= SS Genota =

B-class oil tankers

History

United Kingdom
- Name: SS Genota
- Owner: Gaz de France
- Port of registry: London, UK
- Ordered: 1972
- Builder: CNIM-La Seyne, France
- Launched: 16 October 1974
- In service: 1975
- Out of service: 1986
- Homeport: London
- Fate: Sold to Brunei in December 1986.

Brunei
- Name: SS Bubuk
- Owner: Brunei Shell Tankers (1986); Brunei Liquified Natural Gas (2015)
- Operator: STASCo
- Port of registry: Muara, Brunei
- Acquired: 1986
- In service: 1986
- Out of service: 2011
- Homeport: Brunei
- Identification: IMO number: 7359785; Callsign: V8XG
- Fate: Scrapped in April 2015

General characteristics
- Class & type: B-class oil tankers (Brunei); G-class oil tankers (France)
- Displacement: 51,579 tons
- Length: 260 m (853 ft 0 in)
- Beam: 35 m (114 ft 10 in)
- Boats & landing craft carried: 2 x life boats

SS Bubuk was the sixth ship of the seven B-class oil tankers. She was previously known as Genota. She was named after the bubuk, a species of fish found in Brunei and Malaysia.

== Development ==
B-class oil tankers were built by CNIM-La Syne, France in 1972 to 1975. They served Gaz de France for around 14 years, the B-class vessels were acquired and delivered to BST in December 1986. Previously referred to as the G-class vessels chartered under Shell Tankers United Kingdom (STUK). They continued to provide reliable service to the company and its client especially BLNG. Four out of the seven BST vessels were fully crewed by Bruneian sailors with the exception of senior management; a feat yet to be achieved but not impossible.

All B-class vessels had an average cargo capacity of 75,000 m^{3} (470,000 bbl) and were certified with the 'Green Passport' for the safe carriage of all hazardous materials on board. All B-class oil tankers were taken out of service in 2011. They are all steam powered.

== Construction and career ==
SS Genota was ordered in 1972 and completed in 1975. The tanker was put in service in 1975 and taken out of service to be sold in 1986. In 1986, Brunei Shell acquired Genota and renamed her Bubuk. Throughout her career she routinely traveled between Brunei and Japan carrying LNG.

On 7 April 2011 the vessel was delivered to Jiangyin Ship Recycling, China for scrapping. She was demolished on 23 April 2015.
