= South West Ampa gas field =

Offshore gas field in Brunei

South West Ampa
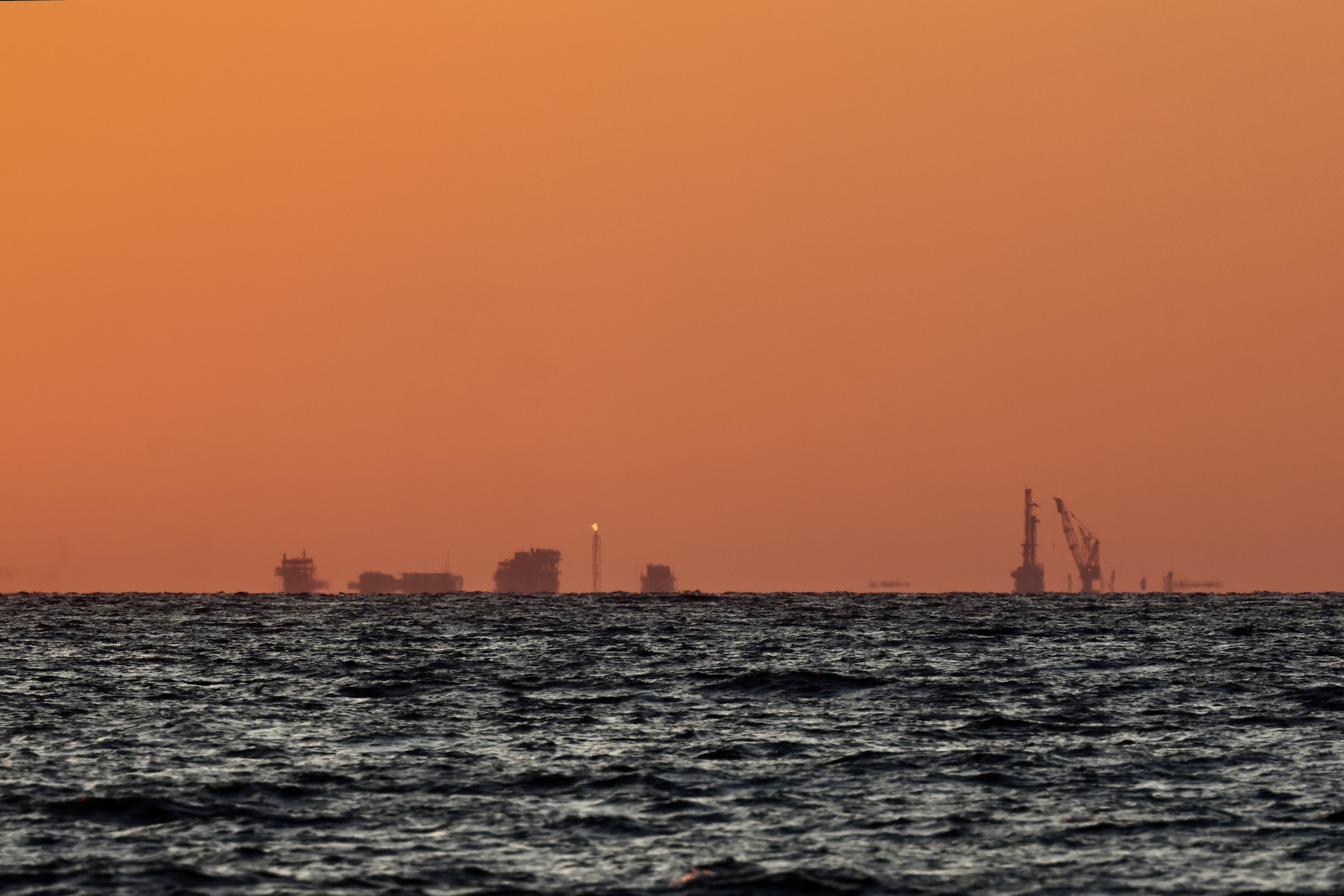
- The oil field in 2023
- Country: Brunei
- Region: Belait
- Offshore/onshore: Offshore
- Coordinates: 4.75041°N 114.11245°E
- Operator: Brunei Shell Petroleum
- Owner: Brunei Shell Petroleum (50%); Government of Brunei (50%)

Field history
- Discovery: 1963
- Start of production: 1965
- Peak year: 1973

Production
- Current production of oil: 9,500 m^{3}/d (60,000 bbl/d)
- Peak of production (oil): 125,796 barrels per day (~6.268×10^{6} t/a)
- Recoverable oil: 128,000,000 million barrels (~1.75×10^{13} t)

South West Ampa (SWA) gas field, also known as Ampa Field or Southwest Ampa, is a conventional gas field 13 kilometres (8.1 mi) off Kuala Belait and near to Fairley and Gannet gas fields. It is managed by Brunei Shell Petroleum (BSP) Company that is situated in the shallow sea. The gas field is owned by the government of Brunei and BSP. The field contains more than half of BSP's gas reserves, with over 400 oil rim reservoirs and 380 non-associated gas reservoirs.

== Etymology ==
Pengiran Temenggong Pengiran Ampa is the grandson of Sultan Muhyiddin. During the reign of Sultan Omar Ali Saifuddin I, he became renowned for his bravery in the battle against Datu Teting-led Sulu forces in 1775. He hurled his spear in the direction of Suluk's boat, and it became stuck. All he needed was bamboo to make the jump he made thus far, to the Suluk leader's boat. After seeing the defeat, the Sultanate of Sulu has renounced its claim to the region north of Brunei became quite afraid and hasn't followed the deal to this day.

== Overview ==
The complex geology, faulting, and internal reservoir cross-flow of the Ampa Field provide challenges despite its well-understood reservoirs.These problems are addressed by research employing 3D models and analytical calculations. Gas from the field is transported 39 kilometres (24 mi) kilometers to the Brunei LNG plant, accounting for more than half of Brunei's gas output and reserves. Significant oil reserves from 164 oil-producing wells are also present in the area. The main field, the southern region, and the 21 area are the three primary hydrocarbon-bearing areas of the field.

The SWA field has a history of producing sand and is made up of several thin, piled sand layers. The sand control completions were difficult because of the problems with shale stability and the many sand layers. The field saw the installation of many openhole gravel packs, all of which failed since the shale collapsed as soon as the openhole was relocated to brine. As a result, expandable sand screen (ESS) was installed in the SWA-290 well as the first sand control technique, replacing gravel packing.

== History ==
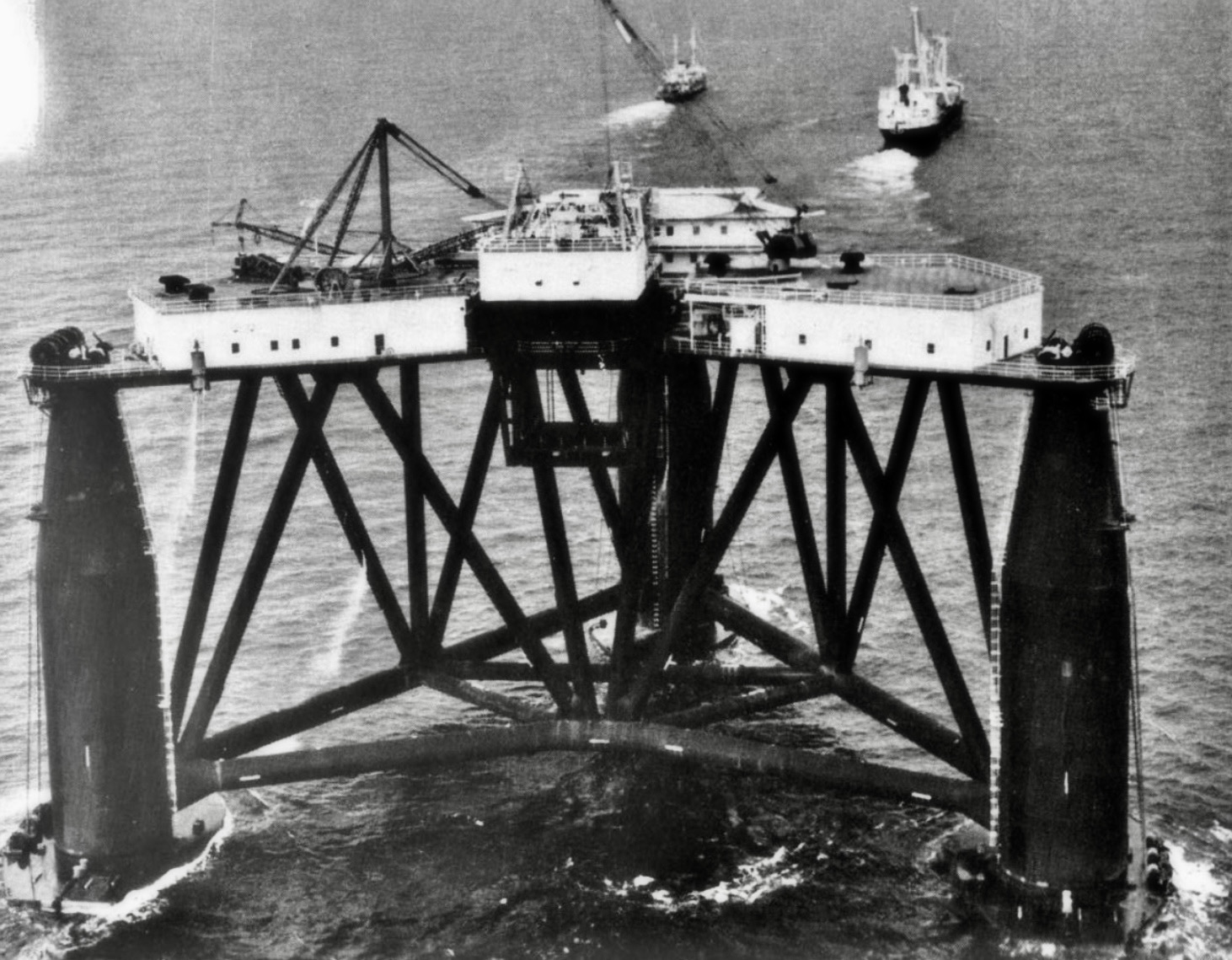
Sedco marine drilling platform at South West Ampa in 1966

The South West Ampa gas field was found in July 1963 and is situated 25 kilometres (16 mi) west of Seria at sea depths of 10–40 metres (33–131 ft). SWA-1 was used for the discovery, which revealed a shallow reservoir with a fluctuating condensate percentage, a relatively high solution gas–oil ratio, an API gravity of 40°, and an initial oil viscosity of 0.35 cp. In order to generate revenue from these deposits, Brunei had to surmount significant obstacles including vast distances to prospective markets, an untested technology for gas liquefaction, and a lack of expertise in LNG transportation.

The main field's oil production began in 1965 and peaked in 1973 at 20,000 cubic metres per day (710,000 cu ft/d). In 1968 and 1970, it reached 9,500 cubic metres per day (340,000 cu ft/d), and the same year, LNG production started. With a peak production year, the South West Ampa recovered 99.79% of its net viable reserves. As of 1996, 161 of the 279 wells that had been drilled in the field were producing, according to BSP. 345,109 cubic centimetres (21,059.8 cu in) of gas, 128,000,000 cubic centimetres (7,800,000 cu in) of oil, and 35,000,000 cubic centimetres (2,100,000 cu in) of condensate are predicted to be the field's ultimate recoveries.

Abdul Rahman Taib formally inaugurated the Ampa Fairley Rationalisation Project in May 2000. BSP granted a three-year contract to McDermott International to transport and build pipelines and umbilicals for the Champion and Ampa Fields offshore Brunei. The work is expected to be completed by 2017. Drilling two distinct campaigns of development wells at the SWA field in 2018 using the jack-up drilling rig Maersk Convincer. On 13 June 2019, BSP plans to begin a 150-day development drilling phase in the shallow-water SWA region.

Production will go on until the field hits its economic limit in 2027, according to economic projections. As of 2021, the field produces around 2% of the nation's daily output.

== Platforms ==
The Ampa-6 and Ampa-9 complexes underwent major offshore upgrades in 2001. These included the installation of two new pipelines, a centralised crude stabilisation facility, and an upgraded distributed control system—all of which had negligible impact on the delivery of oil and gas. Several disused buildings, including SWA-7, SWA-8, SWA-9, SWA-18, SWA-35, SWA-150, AMVJ-2, and AMPP-2, were dismantled in June 2012.

== See also ==
- Oil and natural gas in Brunei
