= SS Geomitra =

B-class oil tankers

History

United Kingdom
- Name: SS Geomitra
- Owner: Gaz de France
- Port of registry: London, UK
- Ordered: 1972
- Builder: CNIM-La Seyne, France
- Launched: 11 February 1974
- In service: 1975
- Out of service: 1986
- Homeport: London
- Fate: Sold to Brunei in December 1986

Brunei
- Name: SS Bilis
- Owner: Brunei Shell Tankers (1986); Brunei Liquified Natural Gas (2015)
- Operator: STASCo
- Port of registry: Muara, Brunei
- Acquired: 1986
- In service: 1986
- Out of service: 2011
- Homeport: Brunei
- Identification: IMO number: 7347732; Callsign: V8XF
- Fate: Scrapped in December 2014

General characteristics
- Class & type: B-class oil tankers (Brunei); G-class oil tankers (France)
- Displacement: 51,579 tons
- Length: 260 m (853 ft 0 in)
- Beam: 35 m (114 ft 10 in)
- Boats & landing craft carried: 2 x lifeboats

SS Bilis was the seventh ship of the seven B-class oil tankers. She was previously known as Geomitra. She is named after the bilis, a species of fish found in Brunei and Malaysia.

== Development ==
B-class oil tankers were built by CNIM-La Syne, France in 1972 to 1975. They served Gaz de France for around 14 years, the B-class vessels were acquired and delivered to BST in December 1986. Previously referred to as the G-class vessels chartered under Shell Tankers United Kingdom (STUK). They continued to provide reliable service to the company and its client especially BLNG. Four out of the seven BST vessels were manned by a fully Bruneian crew with the exception of senior management; a feat yet to be achieved but not impossible.

All B-class vessels had an average cargo capacity of 75,000 m^{3} (470,000 bbl) and were certified with the 'Green Passport' for the safe carriage of all hazardous materials on board. All B-class oil tankers were taken out of service in 2011. They are all steam powered.

== Construction and career ==
SS Geomitra was ordered in 1972 and completed in 1975. The vessel was placed in service in 1975 and taken out of service to be sold in 1986. In 1986, Brunei Shell acquired Geomitra and renamed her Bilis. Throughout her career she routinely traveled between Brunei and Japan carrying oil. On 7 April 2011, the ship was delivered to Zhoushan, China, for scrapping. She was demolished on 2 December 2014.
