= Billionth Barrel Monument =

Monument in Seria, Brunei

- Tugu One Billion Barren
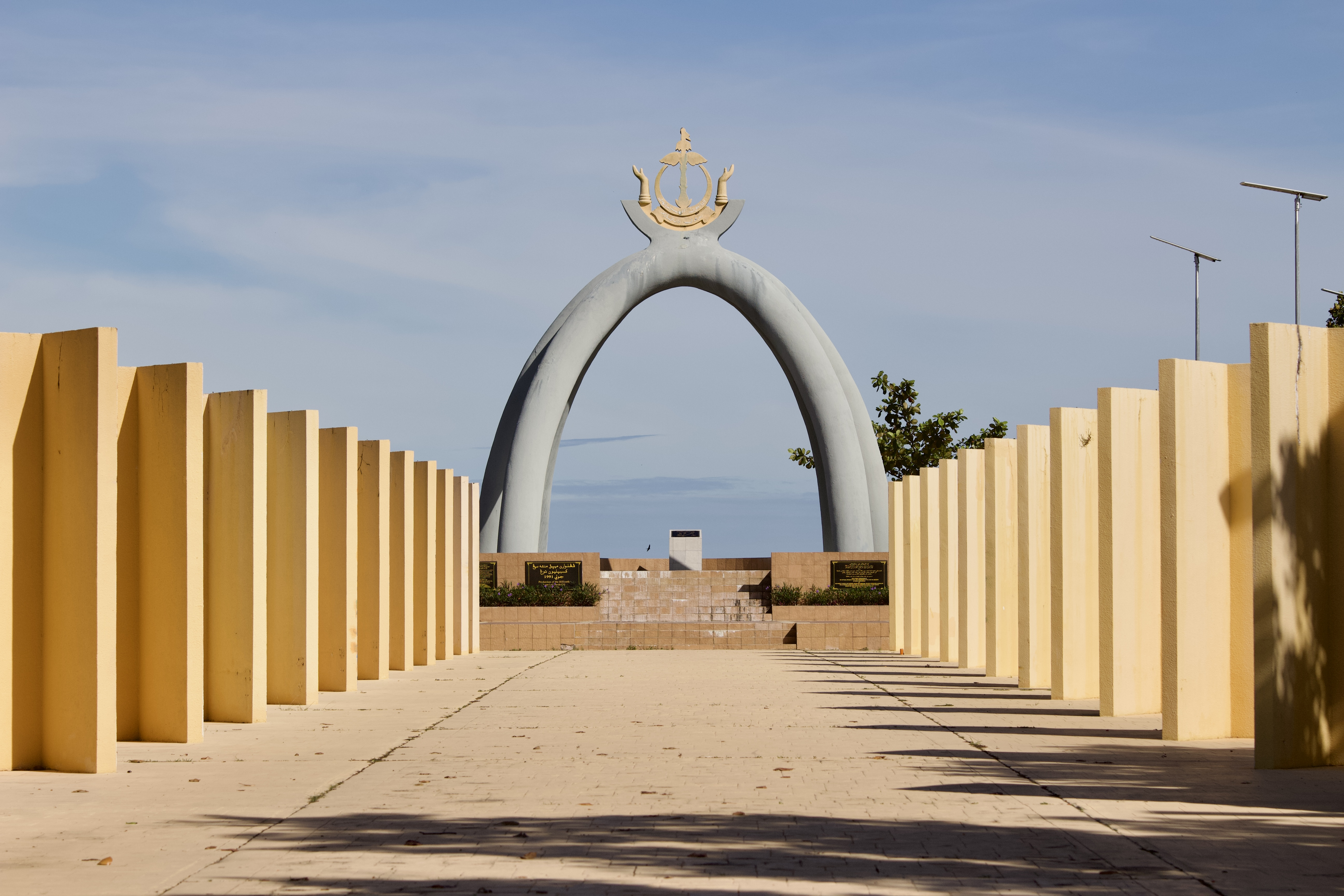
- The monument in 2022
- Interactive map of Billionth Barrel Monument
- Location: Seria, Belait District, Brunei
- Coordinates: 4°37′00″N 114°19′02″E
- Builder: Brunei Shell Petroleum
- Material: Concrete
- Inauguration date: 8 May 2004

The Billionth Barrel Monument (Malay: Tugu One Billion Barren) is a monument in Seria, Brunei, commemorating the production of the billionth barrel of crude oil from the Seria oil field in 1991. The monument is located near the S-1 well, where commercial oil was first discovered in Seria in April 1929. Its design incorporates five pipes symbolising the Five Pillars of Islam, with floor tiles featuring Islamic patterns. Oil pumps, drilling equipment and a locomotive are displayed on either side of the structure.

== Symbolism ==
Several sources date the monument to 1991 rather than 2004. They state that Brunei Shell Petroleum built it in 1991 to celebrate one billion barrels of crude oil extracted from the onshore Seria field, and that Sultan Hassanal Bolkiah unveiled it on 18 July 1991. Its six arches, which join at the top, are described as representing both the flow of oil from beneath the ground to the surface and the number of decades of exploration and production that led to the billionth barrel.

Built by Brunei Shell Petroleum, it was unveiled by Sultan Hassanal Bolkiah on 18 July 1991. The structure features six curved arches representing six decades of oil exploration and production, topped by Brunei's national emblem. Its design also incorporates Islamic motifs, while panels along the approach depict the history of the country's oil and gas industry.

== History ==
Constructed entirely of concrete, it was officially unveiled on 8 May 2004 and fully completes it in July 2015 by Sultan Hassanal Bolkiah to commemorate the 75th anniversary of the oil and gas industry in Brunei. This landmark, built by Brunei Shell Petroleum (BSP), marks the production of one billion barrels of crude oil on 18 July 1991. The monument is located near the S-1, the first well discovered in Seria oil field. The well was discovered by BSP in 1929.

The monument stands along the beach in Seria, just off Jalan Tengah, and is always open, with free entry. Sunset is the most popular time to visit. Visitors can reach Seria from Bandar Seri Begawan by bus, followed by a taxi to the monument, or by renting a car and driving. It occupies a historic spot near the S-1 well site, where drillers first discovered commercial oil in April 1929. The S-1 site is preserved as a historical landmark in the town. Seria also hosts the Oil and Gas Discovery Centre, an interactive science museum, and "nodding donkey" pumps can be seen along its roads. Visitors often combine the monument with a drive through the town to see the oil fields and traditional worker houses. Seria's history is closely tied to the 1929 oil discovery, which led to a settlement centered on the operations of Brunei Shell Petroleum.

== Design ==
On an elevated square, there are five pipes that form an arch structure that is crowned by a gilded coat of arms. The five pipes are reminiscent of the Five Pillars of Islam and the floor tiles are designed according to Islamic models. The monument features panels along the approach path that depict the history of oil and gas exploration and production in the country. On both sides of the monument, there are oil pumps (functional or not), drilling equipment, and a train locomotive.
