= SS Gari =

Third ship of the B-class oil tankers

History

United Kingdom
- Name: SS Gari
- Owner: Gaz De Franz
- Port of registry: London, UK
- Ordered: 1972
- Builder: Chantiers de l'Atlantique, France
- Launched: 20 November 1972
- In service: 1973
- Out of service: 1986
- Homeport: London
- Fate: Sold to Brunei in December 1986

Brunei
- Name: SS Bekulan
- Owner: Brunei Shell Tankers (1986); Brunei Liquified Natural Gas (2015)
- Operator: STASCo
- Port of registry: Muara, Brunei
- Acquired: 1986
- In service: 1986
- Out of service: 2011
- Homeport: Brunei
- Identification: IMO number: 7235939; Callsign: V8XC
- Fate: Scrapped in April 2011

General characteristics
- Class & type: B-class oil tankers (Brunei); G-class oil tankers (France)
- Displacement: 51,579 tons
- Length: 260 m (853 ft 0 in)
- Beam: 35 m (114 ft 10 in)
- Speed: 18 knots
- Boats & landing craft carried: 2 x lifeboats

SS Bekulan was the third ship of the seven B-class oil tankers. She was previously known as Gari. She is named after the bekulan, a species of fish found in Brunei and Malaysia.

== Development ==
B-class oil tankers were built by Chantiers de l'Atlantique, France in 1972 to 1975. They served Gaz de France for around 14 years, the B-class vessels were acquired and delivered to BST in December 1986. Previously referred to as the G-class vessels chartered under Shell Tankers United Kingdom (STUK). They continued to provide reliable service to the company and its client especially BLNG. Four out of the seven BST vessels are crewed by a full Bruneian crew with the exception of senior management; a feat yet to be achieved but not impossible.

All B-class vessels have an average cargo capacity of 75,000 m^{3} (470,000 bbl) and are certified with the 'Green Passport' for the safe carriage of all hazardous materials on board. All B-class oil tankers were taken out of service in 2011. They are all steam powered.

== Construction and career ==
SS Gari was ordered in 1972 and completed in 1973. The vessel entered service in 1973 and was taken out of service to be sold in 1986.

In August 1980, off Okinawa, Japan, Gari received a distress call from a Soviet Russian Echo-class submarine. The crew of Gari moved to the and assist the submarine. The submarine ran into problem with its engine and was dead in the water. The Russian Embassy in Tokyo expressed its thanks to the crew of Gari.

In 1986, Brunei Shell acquired Gari and renamed her Bekulan. Throughout her career she routinely traveled between Brunei and Japan carrying oil. On 7 April 2011, Bekulan was delivered to Jiangyin Ship Recycling, China for scrapping.

== Gallery ==
SS Gari & SS Bekulan Gallery

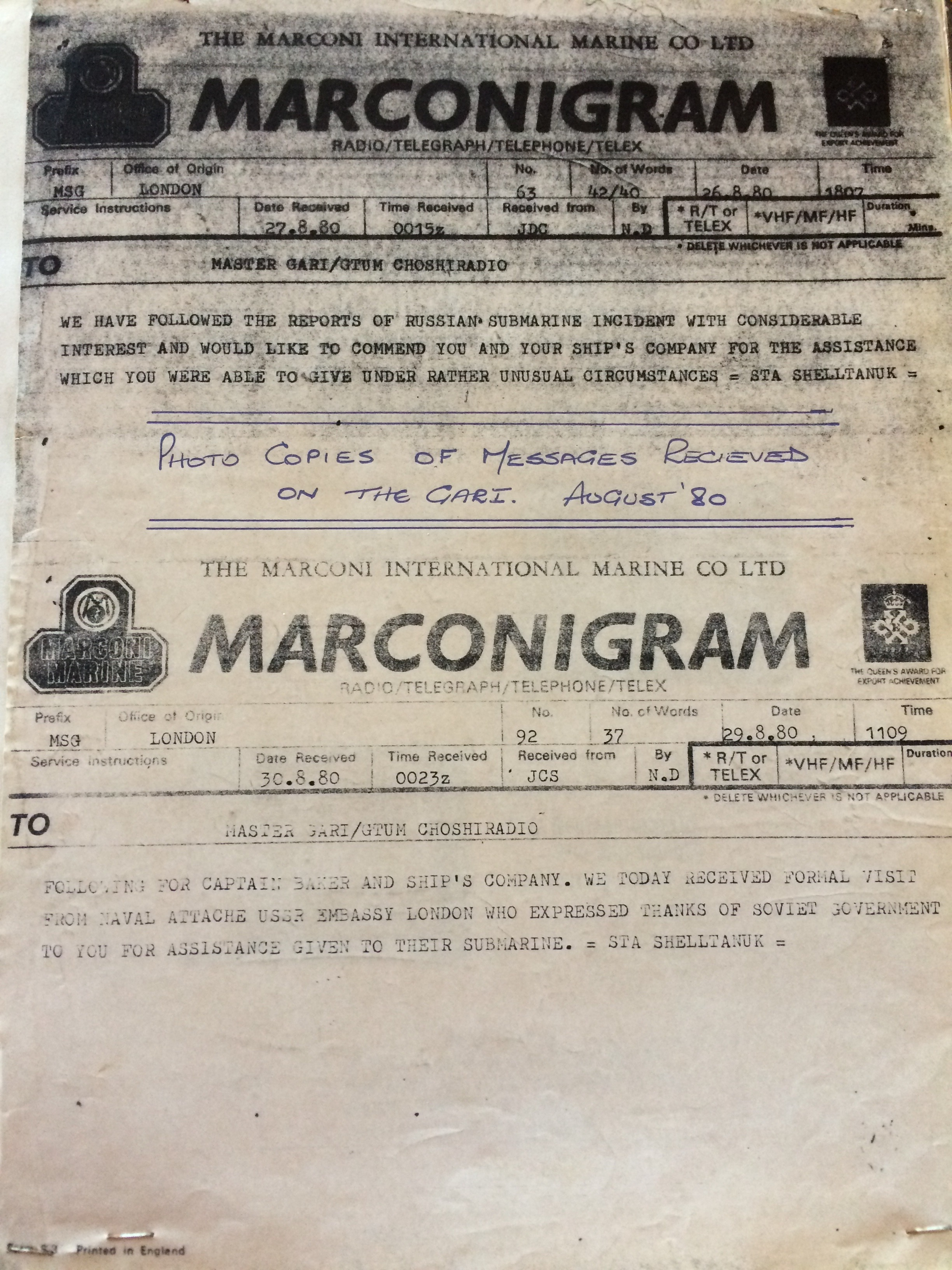
Two telegrams to SS Gari regarding the incident in August 1980 aiding a Soviet submarine in distress.

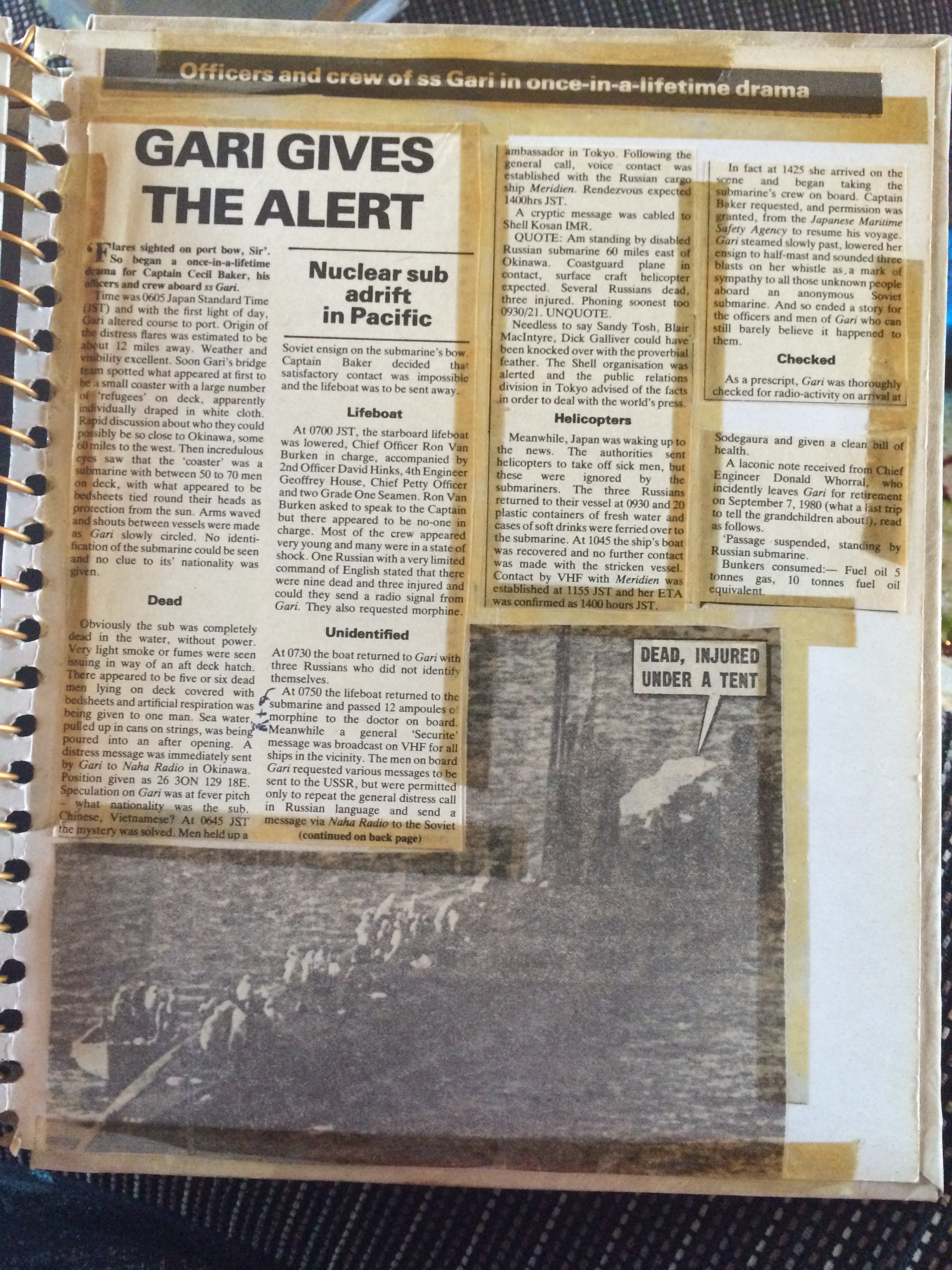
Newspaper/magazine clipping covering the incident in August 1980 when a Soviet submarine was aided by SS Gari, relaying the words of the Russian Naval Attache in thanks to the crew.

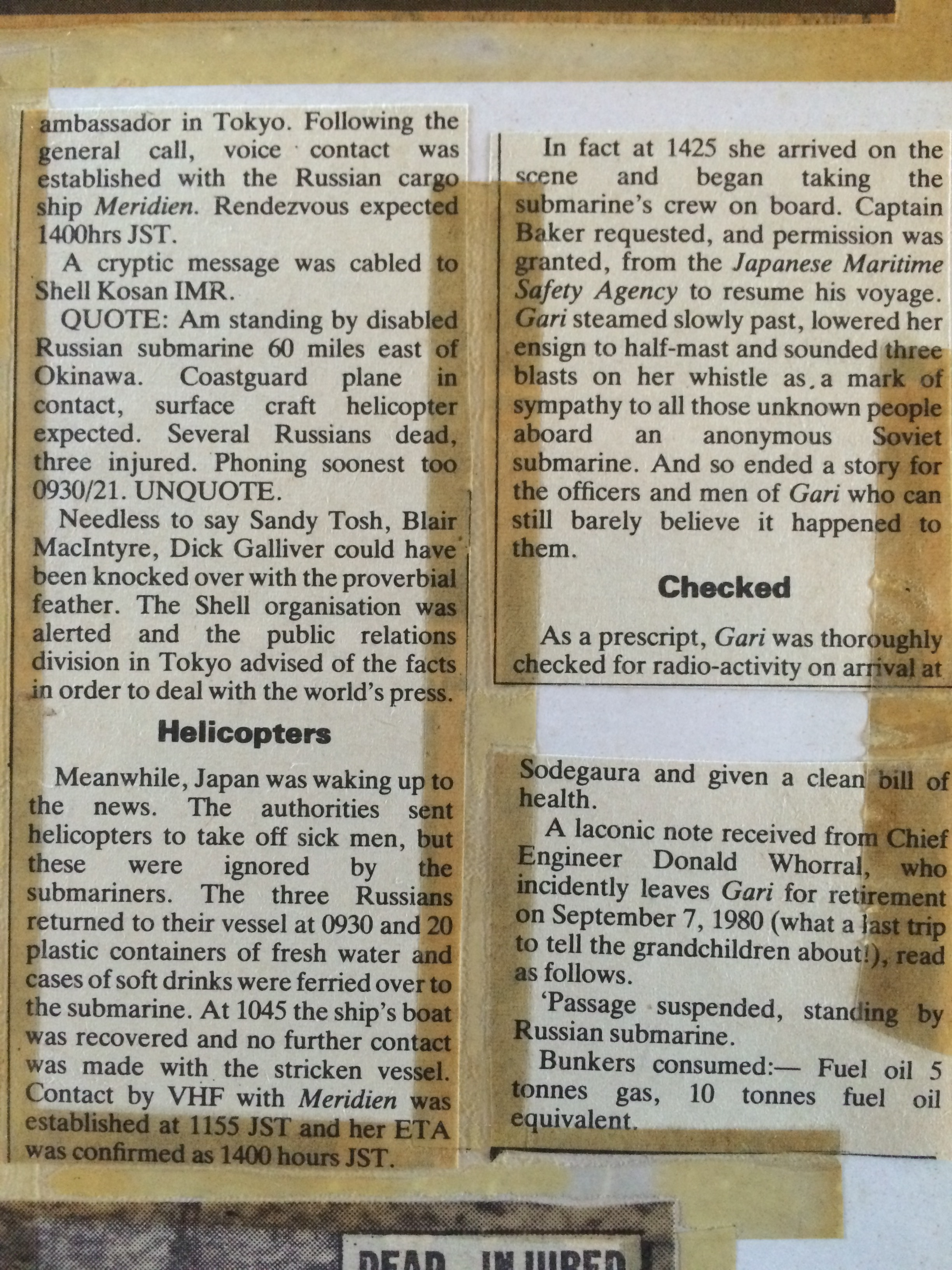

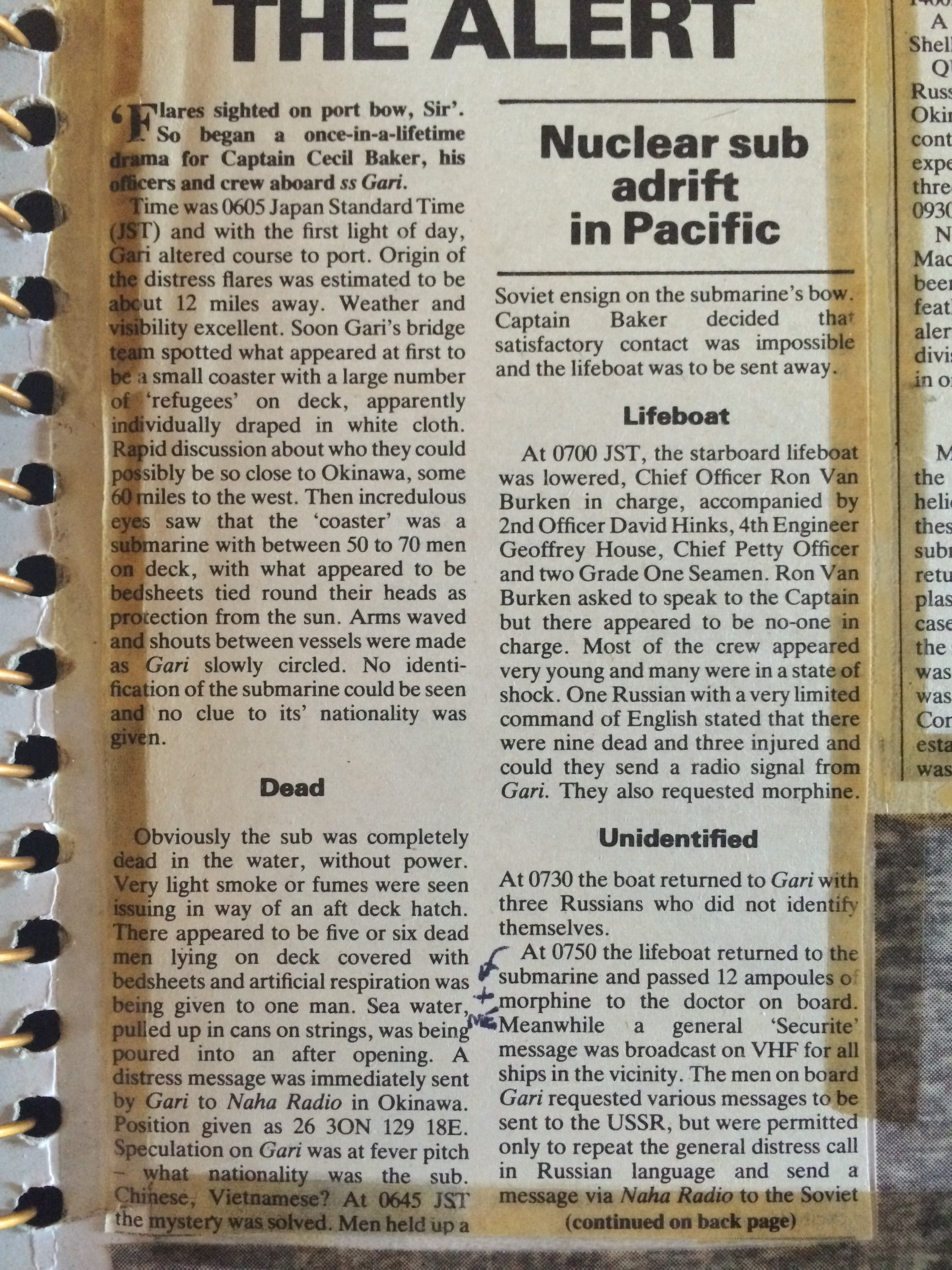

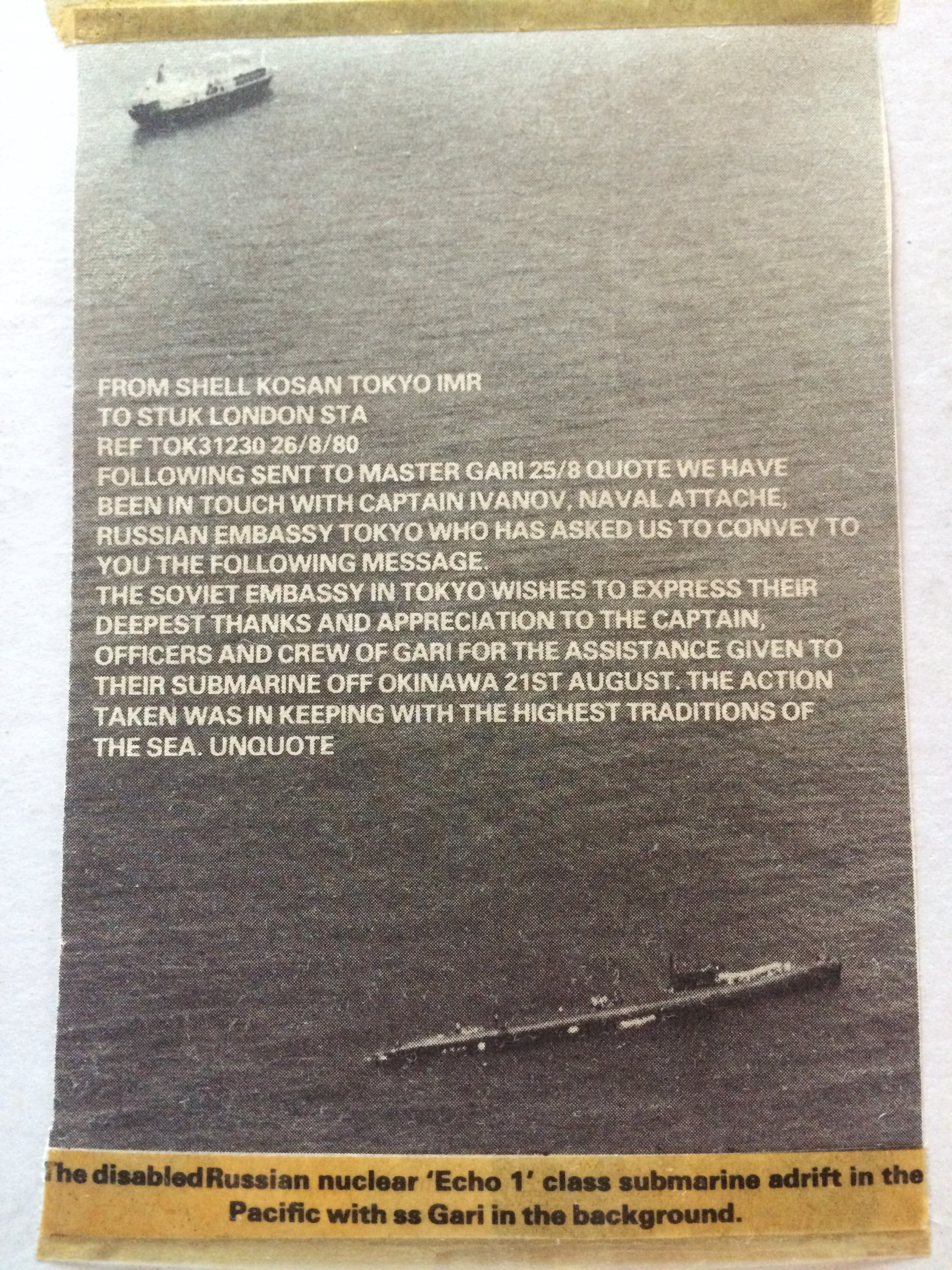
