= Oil and natural gas in Brunei =

Oil and natural gas in Brunei make up 76% of Brunei's government revenue. Brunei produces the fourth most natural gas in the world and the third most oil in Southeast Asia. Oil was found in the Seria oil field in April 1929. Brunei Shell was given a monopoly over oil drilling in Brunei until 1964.

== Background ==
Oil and gas make up 91% of Bruneian commodity exports and 76% of government income. Oil and gas allowed Brunei to become a high-income nation. The Brunei Economic Development Board has attempted to promote the development of oil and gas in Brunei. A majority of Bruneian electricity is sourced from natural gas, which is also subsidized. Bruneian electricity is the lowest priced in Southeast Asia.

Brunei produces the third most oil in Southeast Asia and fourth most natural gas in the world. Brunei is attempting to diversify its economy away from oil.

== History ==
Brunei Shell came to be sometime in 1913. While an oil rush happened in 1917, by the next year, the Anglo-Saxon Petroleum Company—later becoming Brunei Shell—was the only company still searching for oil. The Seria oil field was discovered in April 1929. Brunei Shell was the only company allowed to drill for oil in Brunei until 1964.

Negotiations for Brunei to enter the Federation of Malaya was frozen after the Sultan Omar Ali Saifuddin III refused to recognize the Malaysian government's right to tax and levy a 5% export tax oil in Brunei. Malaysia agreed to let Brunei have some rights over their oil for 10 years, but the Sultan demanded exclusive rights to their oil revenue permanently. After the discovery of the South West Ampa in 1963, the Sultan was unfriendly to the demand that the central government would control the oil discovery. Due to the disagreements on who would control the oil, the Sultan refused to join Malaysia in 1963.

After the Tentara Nasional Kalimantan Utara won in the first District Council elections, the Seria oil was seized by the Tentara Nasional Kalimantan Utara to end British rule in Brunei. Britain used a 1959 defense treaty to end the Brunei revolt. In 1977, Brunei increased the share of the Brunei liquefied natural gas industry that Bruneian government owned.

Economic diversification away from oil was one of the four goals of the Wawasan 2035 plan. In 2025, Brunei issued its first offshore oil licenses in over 10 years.

== Bibliography ==
- Slesman, Ly; Baha, Roslee (January 10, 2024). Anata, Aris; Hoon, Chang-Yau; Hamdan, Mahani (eds.). Catalysts for Socio-economic Development in Brunei Darussalam. Cambridge University Press.
- Suryani Abu Bakar, Nani (2006). "A Historical Overview of Brunei's Economy Before the Discovery of Oil and Some Subsequent Issues" (PDF). Southeast Asia: A Multidisciplinary Journal. 7 (1).
- Ahmad, Hamzar (September 1980). "Oil and Security in Brunei". Contemporary Southeast Asia. 2 (2): 182–191 – via JSTOR.
- Hamzah, B.A. (1981). "Oil and Independence in Brunei: A Perspective". Southeast Asian Affairs: 93–99 – via JSTOR.
