= SS Gadinia =

Lead ship of the B-class oil tankers

History

United Kingdom
- Name: SS Gadinia
- Owner: Gaz de France
- Port of registry: London, UK
- Ordered: 1972
- Builder: Chantiers de l'Atlantique, France
- Launched: 8 October 1971
- In service: 1973
- Out of service: 1986
- Homeport: London
- Fate: Sold to Brunei in December 1986.

Brunei
- Name: SS Bebatik
- Owner: Brunei Shell Tankers (1986); Brunei Liquified Natural Gas (2015)
- Operator: STASCo
- Port of registry: Muara, Brunei
- Acquired: 1986
- In service: 1986
- Out of service: 28 April 2018
- Homeport: Brunei
- Identification: IMO number: 7121633; MMSI number: 508030000; Callsign: V8XA
- Fate: Scrapped, in 2018

General characteristics
- Class & type: B-class oil tankers (Brunei) G-class oil tankers (France)
- Displacement: 51,579 tons
- Length: 260 m (853 ft 0 in)
- Beam: 35 m (114 ft 10 in)
- Speed: 18 knots
- Boats & landing craft carried: 2 x lifeboats

SS Bebatik was the lead ship of the seven B-class LNG tankers. She was also known previously as Gadinia. She is named after the bebatik, a species of fish found in Brunei and Malaysia.

== Development ==
B-class LNG carriers were built by Chantiers de l'Atlantique, France in 1972 to 1975. They served Gaz de France for around 14 years, the B-Class vessels were acquired and delivered to BST in December 1986. Previously referred to as the G-class vessels chartered under Shell Tankers United Kingdom (STUK). They continued to provide reliable service to the company and its client especially BLNG. Four out of the seven BST vessels are crewed by a fully Bruneian complement with the exception of senior management; a feat yet to be achieved but not impossible.

All B-class vessels have an average cargo capacity of 75,000 m^{3} (470,000 bbl) and are certified with the 'Green Passport' for the safe carriage of all hazardous materials on board. All B-class LNG tankers were decommissioned in 2011. They are all steam powered with a top speed of 18 knots.

== Construction and career ==
SS Gadinia was ordered in 1972 and completed in the same year. The vessel entered service in 1972 and was taken out of service to be sold in 1986. In 1986, Brunei Shell acquired Gadinia and renamed her Bebatik. Throughout her career she routinely traveled between Brunei and Japan carrying LNG.

On 28 April 2018, she was taken out of service and scrapped in Shanghai, China after 45 years of service. She was among the last two in service.

An art of her was drawn on one of the walls in the Billionth Barrel Monument.
