= Constructions industrielles de la Méditerranée =

French equipment manufacturer

Constructions industrielles de la Méditerranée S.A.
- Industry: Engineering
- Predecessor: Société Nouvelle des Forges et Chantiers de la Méditerranée
- Founded: 1856; 170 years ago
- Headquarters: Paris, France
- Revenue: 634.9M€ (2017)
- Net income: 22M€ (2017)
- Number of employees: 2,570 (2017)
- Website: www.cnim.com

CNIM is a French equipment manufacturer and industrial contractor operating on a worldwide basis. The group supplies products and services to major public and private sector organisations, local authorities and national governments in the environment, energy, defence, and high technology markets. Founded in 1856, CNIM is listed on the Euronext exchange in Paris. It relies on a stable family-based majority shareholding structure committed to its development.

The company is also a manufacturer of escalators and moving walkways since 1968 primarily for metros and airports, including elevators since 2009, but infrequently when compared to their escalators and moving walkways.
