= Privy Council (Brunei) =

Formal body of advisers to the monarch of Brunei

- Majlis Mesyuarat Diraja
- National emblem of Brunei
- Predecessor: State Council
- Formation: 18 October 1959; 66 years ago
- Legal status: Advisory body
- Headquarters: Brunei
- Monarch: Hassanal Bolkiah (Chairman)
- Clerk: Huraini Hurairah
- Website: www.councils.gov.bn

The Privy Council (Malay: Majlis Mesyuarat Diraja) is a formal body of advisers to the monarch of Brunei. When His Majesty appoints people to posts with traditional ranks, titles, and honours, the council provides advice.

== History ==
The period of the State Council came to an end in September 1959 with the adoption of Brunei's first codified Constitution. The Legislative, Executive, and Privy Councils took the role of the council itself. The council was established in 1959 in accordance with Brunei's constitution, and are in charge of advising His Majesty the Sultan and Yang Di-Pertuan of Brunei Darussalam on the three branches of government which are the executive, judicial, and legislative, even though they have separate powers. This is in keeping with the Malay Islamic Monarchy (MIB) philosophy of the country.

== Membership ==
According to the Brunei Constitutional documents, a Privy Council that is constituted in conformity with Part IV's rules must be established. Each Appointed Member of the council shall serve at the pleasure of His Majesty the Sultan and Yang Di-Pertuan for the term and under the conditions set forth in the Instrument appointing him, and subject to such terms. Moreover, the council members should be consisted of:

- The Crown Prince and Senior Minister in the Prime Minister's Office should be notified if such a selection has been made;
- If a Council of Regency has been appointed, the Regents;
- Ex-officio members include the Yang Di-Pertua Adat Istiadat, the Perdana Wazir, the Wazirs, Members of the Council of Ministers, State Mufti, Chief Syar'ie Judge, Attorney General, and any other official that His Majesty the Sultan and Yang Di-Pertuan may from time to time designate by proclamation in the Gazette;
- Any more individuals that His Majesty the Sultan and Yang Di-Pertuan may nominate by instrument bearing the State Emblem are referred to as Appointed Members.

Before beginning their duties, each member of the council must take, make, and complete to an oath or declaration in the form specified as Form I in the First Schedule before His Majesty the Sultan and Yang Di-Pertuan, or, if a Council of Regency has been appointed, before the senior male Regent, or before such other person as His Majesty the Sultan and Yang Di-Pertuan or, as the case may be, the senior male Regent may designate.

== Functions ==
As of 2008, His Majesty the Sultan and Yang Di-Pertuan has granted the Privy Council the duty to advise His Majesty in connection with the exercise of His Majesty's powers under Clause (1) of Article 9 of the Constitution of Brunei Darussalam. This is done in accordance with the Constitution of Brunei Darussalam (Suspension) Order, 2006.

Additionally, every Privy Council proceedings must be recorded in minutes. The Clerk to the council shall be appointed by His Majesty the Sultan and Yang Di-Pertuan, and prior to performing the duties of his office, the Clerk shall take and subscribe an oath in the form specified as Form II in the First Schedule before His Majesty the Sultan and Yang Di-Pertuan or the senior male Regent, as applicable. The council may signify the use of any authority granted to it or the performance of any act or item by it under the Clerk to the council's hand, subject to any established laws. The advice of the Privy Council is not required to be followed when making decisions by His Majesty the Sultan and Yang Di-Pertuan.

== Procedure ==
=== Summoning ===
If a Council of Regency has been appointed, the senior male Regent may summon the Privy Council; otherwise, if His Majesty the Sultan and Yang Di-Pertuan are not in Brunei Darussalam and a Council of Regency has not been appointed, the Perdana Wazir may summon the council. When less than one-third of the council's members are present (aside from His Majesty the Sultan and Yang Di-Pertuan or the other person presiding), and if His Majesty the Sultan and Yang Di-Pertuan or the other person presiding has objected to the transaction of business on that basis, no business may be transacted at any Privy Council meeting. For the purposes of this clause, the council's membership shall be regarded to be the next highest multiple of three if the number of members is not a multiple of three. Any Privy Council sessions and any related decisions made by that council are lawful despite the participation of anyone who was not authorised to do so.

=== Chairing ===
Insofar as is practical, His Majesty the Sultan and Yang Di-Pertuan will preside over Privy Council meetings. The person who will preside in His Majesty the Sultan and Yang Di-Pertuan's absence will be in the order listed below.

- In the absence of a Deputy Sultan and Yang Di-Pertuan and a Council of Regent, the senior male Regent shall preside.
- In the absence of a Deputy Sultan and Yang Di-Pertuan and a Council of Regent, such Member of the Privy Council as His Majesty the Sultan and Yang Di-Pertuan may appoint.
- In the absence of such Member or where no such Member has been appointed, the Perdana Wazir.

== Current members ==
As of 15 May 2024, the members were:

Affiliation	Portrait	Person	Date appointed	Roles
Royal Family / politician		Sultan Hassanal Bolkiah		Sultan of Brunei (1967–present); Prime Minister of Brunei (1984–present); Minister of Finance and Economy (1984–1986; 1997–present); Ministry of Defence (1986–present); Minister of Foreign Affairs (2015–2026); Minister of Home Affairs (1984–1986)
Royal Family / politician		Prince Al-Muhtadee Billah		Crown Prince of Brunei (1998–present); Senior Minister at the Prime Minister's Office (2005–present)
Royal Family / politician		Prince Mohamed Bolkiah		Perdana Wazir (1970–present); Minister of Foreign Affairs and Trade (1984–2015)
Royal Family		Prince Sufri Bolkiah		Bendahara (1979–present); President of Brunei Darussalam National Olympic Council (2010–present); President of National Football Association of Brunei Darussalam (2013–2019)
Royal Family / politician		Prince Jefri Bolkiah		Di-Gadong (1979–present); Minister of Finance (1986–1997)
Royal Family		Prince Abdul Malik	7 April 2011	Chairman of the Management Committee of the Sultan Haji Hassanal Bolkiah's Foundation (2013–2017)
Royal Family		Prince Abdul Mateen	7 April 2011	Minister of Foreign Affairs (2026–present)
Royal Family		Prince Abdul Wakeel	16 May 2024	
Royal Family		Pengiran Anak Idris	9 April 2021	Yang Di-Pertua Adat Istiadat Negara (2021–present)
Royal Family		Pengiran Anak Abdul Rahim		Cheteria 4 (2004–present)
Royal Family / politician		Pengiran Ibnu Basit		Cheteria Under Cheteria 4 (1977–present); Deputy Minister of Defence (1986–2005)
politician		Isa Ibrahim	30 January 2018	Minister at the Prime Minister's Office (2018–present); Special Adviser to His Majesty the Sultan and Yang Di-Pertuan (2018–present); Speaker of Legislative Council (2011–2015); Minister of Home Affairs (1986–2005); Additional Manteri Under Manteri 4
politician		Badaruddin Othman	29 May 2010	Minister of Religious Affairs (2015–present); Minister of Home Affairs (2010–2015); Manteri Ugama under Manteri 8
politician		Halbi Mohammad Yussof	22 October 2015	Minister at the Prime Minister's Office (2022–present); Second Minister of Defence (2018–2022; 2023–present); Minister of Culture, Youth and Sports (2015–2018); Commander of the Royal Brunei Armed Forces (2003–2009); Commander of the Royal Brunei Land Force (2001–2003); Additional Manteri under Manteri 32
politician		Isham Jaafar	1 December 2017	Minister of Health (2017–present)
politician		Amin Liew Abdullah	30 January 2018	Minister at the Prime Minister's Office (2018–present); Second Minister of Finance (2018–present)
politician		Erywan Yusof	29 January 2018	Second Minister of Foreign Affairs (2018–present)
politician		Ahmaddin Abdul Rahman	7 June 2022	Minister of Home Affairs (2022–present)
politician		Abdul Manaf Metussin	7 June 2022	Minister of Primary Resources and Tourism (2022–present)
politician		Juanda Abdul Rashid	7 June 2022	Minister of Development (2022–present)
politician		Romaizah Mohd Salleh	7 June 2022	Minister of Education (2022–present)
politician		Shamhary Mustapha	7 June 2022	Minister of Transport and Infocommunications (2022–present)
politician		Nazmi Mohamad	7 June 2022	Minister of Culture, Youth and Sports (2022–present)
politician		Abdul Aziz Juned	1 September 1994	State Mufti (1994–present); Kepala Manteri Ugama (1996–present)
lawyer		Nor Hashimah Taib	6 October 2020	Attorney General (2024–present)
lawyer		Salim Besar		Chief Syar'ie Judge (2015–present); Additional Manteri Ugama Under Manteri Ugama
politician		Abdul Aziz Umar	7 April 2011	Minister of Education (1984–1986; 1988–2005); Minister of Communications (1986–1988)
politician		Abdul Wahab Said		
clerk/secretary		Huraini Hurairah	9 January 2024	Clerk to the Privy Council (2024–present); Secretary to the Cabinet Ministers' Council (2024–present); Clerk to the Legislative Council (2024–present)

== See also ==
- Government of Brunei
- Council of Cabinet Ministers
