= Pengiran Zety Sufina =

Bruneian politician (born 1971)

Datin Seri Paduka Pengiran Zety Sufina SPMB
- ڠيرن زيتي صوفينا
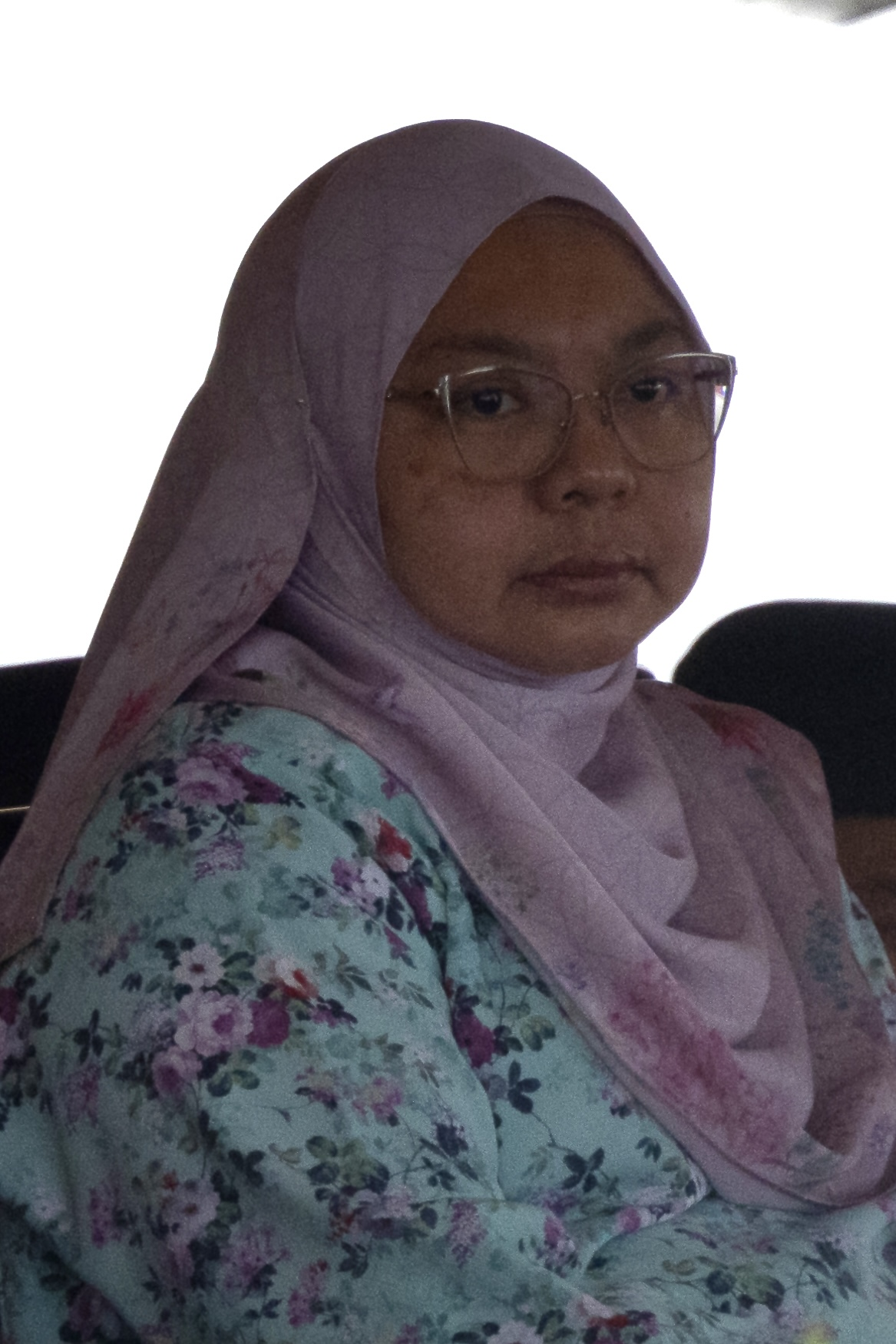
- Pengiran Zety Sufina in 2024

Deputy Minister of Finance and Economy
- In office 7 June 2022 – 4 June 2026 Serving with Khairuddin Abdul Hamid
- Monarch: Hassanal Bolkiah
- Minister: Hassanal Bolkiah; Amin Liew Abdullah
- Preceded by: Ahmaddin Abdul Rahman; Abdul Manaf Metussin

Personal details
- Born: 31 October 1971 (age 54) Brunei
- Spouse: Azlan Ahmad
- Education: University of Hull (B.Acc.)

Pengiran Zety Sufina binti Pengiran Haji Sani (born 31 October 1971) is a Bruneian politician who currently serves as the Deputy Minister of Finance since 2022. Additionally, she is the co-chair of the Centre of Strategic and Policy Studies, deputy co-chairman of Brunei Economic Development Board (BEDB), Chairman of Ghanim International Corporation, and Director of Royal Brunei Airlines (RBA) from 2021 to 2023. She is also the deputy chairman of the board of directors of several institutions such as Brunei Darussalam Central Bank (BDCB) and Jerudong Park Medical Centre (JPMC).

== Career ==
The Ministry of Education awarded Pengiran Zety Sufina a Special Scheme Scholarship in 1989. In 1993, she earned an Bachelor's Degree in Accounting (hons) in accounting from the University of Hull in the United Kingdom. She started working as a finance officer in the Treasury Department of the Ministry of Finance immediately after graduating, working in a variety of departments including the Housing Loan Unit, the Main Ledger Unit, and the Payroll Unit.

In May 1998, Pengiran Zety Sufina was assigned to the Ministry of Defence's Directorate of Finance & Acquisition (DFA). She received the opportunity to fill the position of Assistant Director of Finance at DFA in December 2005 after being promoted to Senior Finance Officer. She was relocated to the Ministry of Finance's Expenditure Division in March 2010, where her primary responsibility was managing the state budget, and was given the position of Assistant Director of Budget a year later. She gained useful expertise in international development and attempts to reduce poverty while working for a year at the World Bank in Washington, D.C., in 2012 as the Senior Adviser in the Southeast Asia Constituency Executive Director's Office.

Pengiran Zety Sufina was appointed the Deputy Director at the Wawasan Brunei Council Secretariat in the Prime Minister's Office in April 2015, about a year after she returned to Brunei. Prior to that, she spent a few months as the Acting Senior Assistant Accountant General at the Treasury Department in the Ministry of Finance.

Pengiran Zety Sufina was named the Ministry of Defence's Deputy Permanent Secretary (Finance & Administration) on 21 November 2016. She was named Permanent Secretary (Performance & Corporate) at the Ministry of Finance and Economy on 20 September 2018, after being elevated to Permanent Secretary (Economy & Finance) at the Prime Minister's Office on 12 August of same year. She was named Permanent Secretary (Industry) at the Ministry of Finance and Economy as of 5 December 2019.

The Agreement on Mutual Protection of the Results of Intellectual Activity and Intellectual Property Protection in the Course of Bilateral Military-Technical Cooperation between the Governments of Russia and Brunei was signed on 4 April 2018 by Pengiran Zety Sufina and the Head of the Russian Federal Service for Intellectual Property.

On 7 June 2022, the sultan of Brunei announced the replacement of eight ministers and the appointment of the nation's first female cabinet member. Pengiran Zety Sufina, one of the female members of the new cabinet, was elevated from permanent secretary to deputy minister at the Ministry of Finance and Economy (MOFE).

== Personal life ==
Pengiran Zety Sufina is the oldest of her five siblings and was born on 31 October 1971. She has four children, is married to Commander (Retired) Haji Azlan bin Haji Ahmad, and enjoys cycling, travel, and photography.

== Honours ==
Pengiran Zety Sufina has earned the following honours:

- First Class of the Order of Seri Paduka Mahkota Brunei (SPMB) – Datin Seri Paduka (15 July 2022)

Political offices
Preceded by Ahmaddin Abdul Rahman; Abdul Manaf Metussin	Deputy Minister of Finance and Economy; 7 June 2022 – present	Succeeded by Incumbent
