= Council of Cabinet Ministers =

Executive branch of the Brunei government

- Majlis Mesyuarat Menteri-Menteri Kabinet
- National emblem of Brunei

Cabinet overview
- Formed: 18 October 1959; 66 years ago
- Jurisdiction: Government of Brunei
- Headquarters: Prime Minister's Office
- Cabinet executives: Hassanal Bolkiah, Prime Minister; Judin Asar, Secretary
- Website: www.councils.gov.bn

The Council of Cabinet Ministers (Malay: Majlis Mesyuarat Menteri-Menteri Kabinet) is the body of high-ranking Brunei officials, consisting of the top leaders of the executive branch of Brunei government. Led by the Sultan himself, who has also been the Prime Minister of Brunei since 1984.

The Council consists of the Prime Minister (the Sultan), the Senior Minister (the Crown Prince), ministers and the second ministers, and deputy ministers of respectives ministries. All of the ministers and deputy ministers are appointed by the Prime Minister-Sultan. The ministers are responsible directly to the Sultan and hold their seats at His Majesty's pleasure, usually reshuffle and nominate every 4 years (since 2022).

== History ==
The cabinet was established in 1959. Immediately upon Brunei's independence on 1 January 1984, the following portfolios were introduced as the first cabinet line-up:

- Prime Minister
- Minister of Communications
- Minister of Culture, Youth and Sports
- Minister of Defence
- Minister of Development
- Minister of Education
- Minister of Finance
- Minister of Foreign Affairs
- Minister of Home Affairs
- Minister of Law
- Deputy Minister of Finance

On 20 October 1986, after the demise of the late Sultan Omar Ali Saifuddien III, the cabinet was reshuffled which saw the introduction of new ministerial posts, namely the Ministers of Health and Religious Affairs, and Special Adviser in the Prime Minister's Office. The reshuffle saw the cabinet being enlarged to a total of 13 ministerial and 8 deputy ministerial posts.

The cabinet was reshuffled again in 1986, 1988, 2005, 2010, 2015, 2018, and 2022. Since 2005, cabinet reshuffle typically happened every five years. However, the 2015 cabinet term lasted less than five years with a "surprise" reshuffle in 2018, with no official reason given, although it was speculated that corruption could be a reason. In contrast to the previous cabinets which served or intended to serve for five years, the 2022 cabinet shall serve for a four-year term.

On 1 April 1993, the post of Secretary to Council of Cabinet Ministers was created, with Judin Asar as the inaugural holder.

The State Mufti and Attorney General were included in the cabinet and declared ministry-level positions in the reshuffles of 2005, 2010, 2015, and 2018.

The 2005 cabinet line-up saw the introduction of new ministerial posts, namely Senior Minister in the Prime Minister's Office, Minister of Energy in the Prime Minister's Office, Second Minister of Finance, and Second Minister of Foreign Affairs. Meanwhile, the 2018 cabinet line-up saw the introduction of the new Second Minister of Defence, but the position was not renewed in 2022 reshuffle.

The 2010 reshuffle saw the appointment of Adina Othman as the first female deputy minister, holding the Deputy Minister of Culture, Youth and Sports portfolio. Meanwhile, the 2022 reshuffle saw the appointment of Romaizah Mohd Salleh as the first female minister, holding the Minister of Education portfolio.

The 2026 cabinet reshuffle also saw the creation of three new coordinating ministerial posts to strengthen policy coordination across ministries: the Coordinating Minister of National Security, the Coordinating Minister for Economic Policies, and the Coordinating Minister for Social and Manpower Policies. The 2026 cabinet reshuffle introduced the following cabinet-level portfolios:

- Prime Minister
- Minister of Defence
- Minister of Finance
- Senior Minister at the Prime Minister's Office
- Minister at the Prime Minister's Office
- Minister of Foreign Affairs
- Coordinating Minister of National Security
- Minister of Defence II
- Coordinating Minister for Economic Policies
- Minister of Economy, Trade and Industry
- Coordinating Minister for Social and Manpower Policies
- Minister of Home Affairs
- Minister at the Prime Minister's Office (Civil Service Governance)
- Minister at the Prime Minister's Office (Security and Law)
- Minister at the Prime Minister's Office (Upstream and Downstream Energy)
- Minister of Finance II
- Minister of Foreign Affairs II
- Minister of Religious Affairs
- Minister of Health
- Minister of Development
- Minister of Education
- Minister of Transport and Infocommunications
- Minister of Culture, Youth and Sports

== Current members ==
Composition of the Cabinet
Portfolio	Minister	Portrait	Date
Prime Minister	Sultan and Yang Di-Pertuan Hassanal Bolkiah		1 January 1984
Minister of Defence	Sultan and Yang Di-Pertuan Hassanal Bolkiah		7 September 1986
Minister of Finance and Economy	Sultan and Yang Di-Pertuan Hassanal Bolkiah		23 February 1997
Senior Minister at the Prime Minister's Office	Crown Prince Al-Muhtadee Billah		24 May 2005
Minister at the Prime Minister's Office	Prince Abdul Malik Bolkiah		4 June 2026
Minister of Foreign Affairs	Prince Abdul Mateen Bolkiah		4 June 2026
Coordinating Minister of National Security	Pehin Halbi Mohammad Yussof		4 June 2026
Minister at the Prime Minister's Office	Pehin Halbi Mohammad Yussof		7 June 2022
Minister of Defence II	Pehin Halbi Mohammad Yussof		27 February 2023
Coordinating Minister for Economic Policy	Abdul Manaf Metussin		4 June 2026
Minister of Economy, Trade and Industry	Abdul Manaf Metussin		4 June 2026
Coordinating Minister for Social and Manpower	Ahmaddin Abdul Rahman		4 June 2026
Minister of Home Affairs	Ahmaddin Abdul Rahman		7 June 2022
Minister (Civil Service Governance) at the Prime Minister's Office	Nazmi Mohamad		4 June 2022
Minister (Security and Law) at the Prime Minister's Office	Sufian Sabtu		4 June 2026
Minister (Upstream and Downstream Energy) at the Prime Minister's Office	Azmi Mohd Hanifah		4 June 2026
Minister of Finance and Economy II	Amin Liew Abdullah		30 January 2018
Minister of Foreign Affairs II	Erywan Yusof		30 January 2018
Minister of Religious Affairs	Pengiran Mohammad Tashim		4 June 2026
Minister of Health	Isham Jaafar		1 December 2017
Minister of Development	Juanda Abdul Rashid		7 June 2022
Minister of Education	Romaizah Mohd Salleh		7 June 2022
Minister of Transport and Infocommunications	Riza Yunos		4 June 2026
Minister of Culture, Youth and Sports	Pengiran Shamhary Mustapha		4 June 2026

== See also ==
- Government of Brunei
