= Khairuddin Abdul Hamid =

Bruneian politician

Dato Seri Paduka Khairuddin Abdul Hamid SPMB PIKB
- خير الدين عبدالحميد
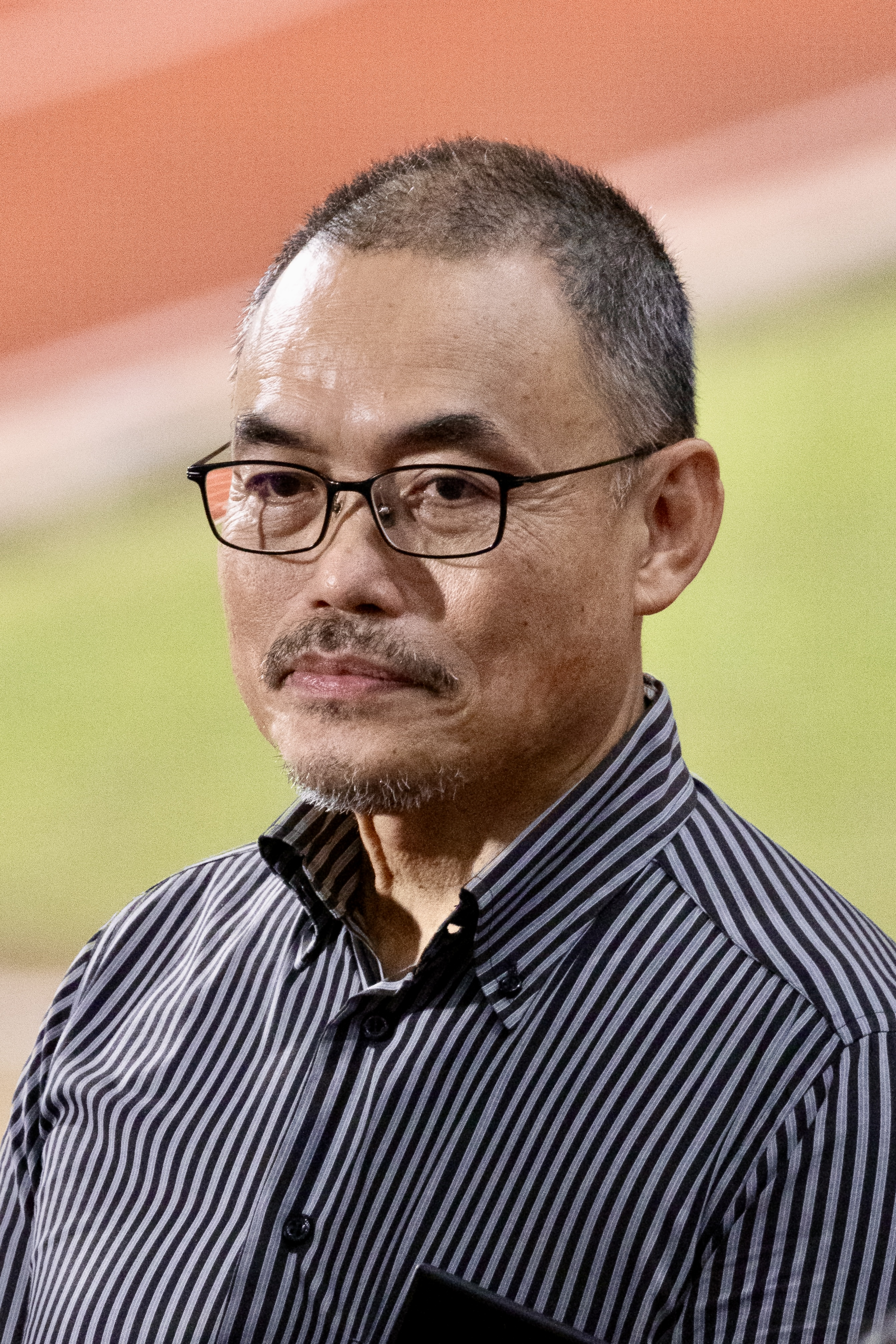
- Dato Khairuddin in 2024

Deputy Minister of Finance and Economy
- In office 7 June 2022 – 4 June 2026 Serving with Pengiran Zety Sufina
- Monarch: Hassanal Bolkiah
- Minister: Hassanal Bolkiah; Amin Liew Abdullah
- Preceded by: Ahmaddin Abdul Rahman; Abdul Manaf Metussin

Chairman of Brunei Darussalam Central Bank
- Incumbent
- Assumed office 28 July 2022
- Deputy: Pengiran Zety Sufina
- Preceded by: Ahmaddin Abdul Rahman

Personal details
- Born: February 1966 (age 60) Brunei
- Education: Universiti Brunei Darussalam (BA)

Khairuddin bin Haji Abdul Hamid (born February 1966) is a Bruneian politician who currently serves as the Deputy Minister of Finance and Economy since 2022. Additionally, he is the CEO of Darussalam Assets (DA) on 30 January 2018 and Barramundi Group on 24 October 2022, and members of several organisations including the Brunei Investment Agency (BIA) in July 2012, Brunei Economic Development Board (BEDB) and Stock Exchange Steering Committee, Investment Committee for Yayasan Sultan Haji Hassanal Bolkiah, Strategic Development Capital Fund and chairman for Brunei Darussalam Central Bank (BDCB).

== Career ==
Khairuddin was born in February 1966. In 1989, he received his Bachelor of Arts (Hons) in Management Studies from the Universiti Brunei Darussalam.

In October 1989, Khairuddin started working for the Bruneian government as an investment officer at the BIA. Prior to being appointed managing director of BIA, he held a number of positions in the company's currency management department, investment department, portfolio manager equity, asset management department, external fund management, and middle office department in Brunei, London, and Boston.

Following his tenure at BIA, Khairuddin held positions as permanent secretary (Investment), deputy permanent secretary (Industry, SME & Tourism) at the Ministry of Primary Resources and Industry from June 2014 to January 2016, and deputy permanent secretary (Investment) at the Ministry of Finance and Economy (MOFE) on 21 January 2016. Khairuddin was appointed as Deputy Minister of Finance and Economy (Economy) at Ministry of Finance and Economy during the 2022 cabinet reshuffle on 7 June.

== Honours ==
He has earned the following honours:

- Order of Seri Paduka Mahkota Brunei First Class (SPMB; 15 July 2022) – Dato Seri Paduka
- Excellent Service Medal (PIKB)

Political offices
Preceded by Ahmaddin Abdul Rahman; Abdul Manaf Metussin	Deputy Minister of Finance and Economy; 7 June 2022 – present	Incumbent
Business positions
Preceded by Ahmaddin Abdul Rahman	Chairman of Brunei Darussalam Central Bank; 17 July 2022 – present	Incumbent
