= 2022 Bruneian cabinet reshuffle =

Brunei cabinet reshuffle undertaken by Hassanal Bolkiah

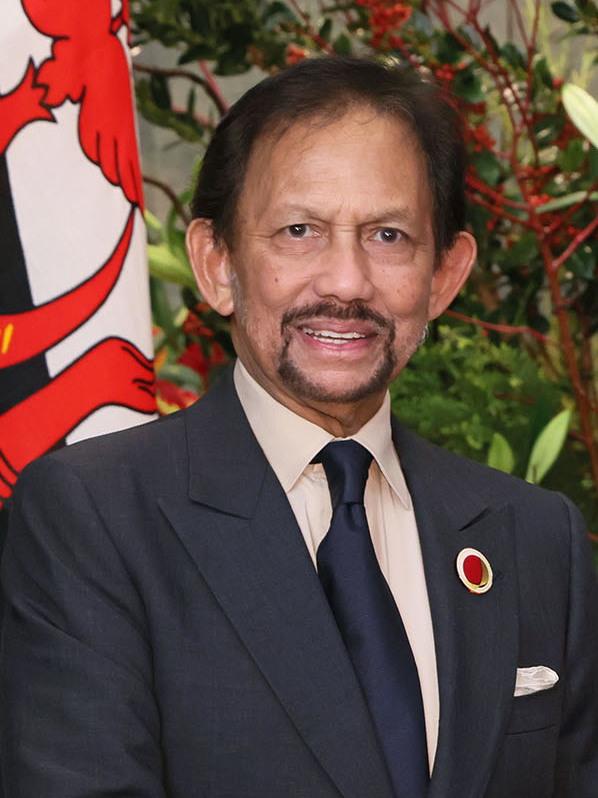
Hassanal Bolkiah

Hassanal Bolkiah carried out the seventh reshuffle of his government on 7 June 2022, appointing the first female cabinet minister and replacing seven ministers. The announcement was delivered during a televised speech at 3:00 pm. The previous cabinet had been reshuffled in 2018 for a five-year term, the sultan unexpectedly introduced this significant change midway through 2022.

This cabinet reshuffle brought about several significant changes. Romaizah Mohd Salleh was appointed as minister of education, marking a historic milestone as the first female minister since the government's establishment in 1959. The sultan retained control of key portfolios, including foreign affairs, finance, defence, and the prime ministership. Crown Prince Al-Muhtadee Billah continued his role as senior minister in the PMO, while Abu Bakar Apong, the home affairs minister and the second-longest serving cabinet member after Isa Ibrahim, was replaced. Unlike the usual five-year term, all new appointments will serve four-year terms.

The sultan emphasised that the appointments represent a trust that must be honoured with unwavering loyalty and accountability as he announced the new lineup of ministers and deputy ministers. (Note: In his televised speech, Hassanal Bolkiah stated, "No one can neglect the trust as it is akin to a sacred promise with Allah Subhanahu Wataala. I would like to thank and appreciate all who are no longer appointed for their services and contributions all this while.") A local media analyst, speaking anonymously to Xinhua, suggested that the early cabinet reshuffle was aimed at injecting fresh energy and enthusiasm into the administrative system while maintaining stability in critical areas of both domestic and international affairs.

This was the first and only significant cabinet reshuffle carried out during the COVID-19 pandemic in Brunei.

== Cabinet-level changes ==
Colour key
- Joined the Cabinet
- Left the Cabinet

Minister	Position before reshuffle	Result of reshuffle
Abdul Mutalib	Minister of Transport and Infocommunications	Left the government
Juanda Abdul Rashid	None	Became Minister of Development
Ahmaddin Abdul Rahman	Deputy Minister of Finance	Became Minister of Home Affairs
Abu Bakar Apong	Minister of Home Affairs	Left the government
Ali Apong	Minister of Primary Resources and Tourism	Left the government
Suhaimi Gafar	Minister of Development	Left the government
Abdul Manaf Metussin	Deputy Minister of Finance and Economy	Became Minister of Primary Resources and Tourism
Pengiran Shamhary	Managing Director of Brunei Gas Carriers (Note: Non-ministerial position)	Became Minister of Transport and Infocommunications
Aminuddin Ihsan	Minister of Culture, Youth and Sports	Left the government
Nazmi Mohamad	Permanent Secretary (Corporate Affairs and Public Administration) at the Prime Minister's Office	Became Minister of Culture, Youth and Sports
Halbi Mohammad Yussof	Minister of Defence II	Became Minister at the Prime Minister's Office
Romaizah Salleh	Deputy Minister of Education	Became Minister of Education

== Junior ministerial changes ==
Colour key
- Joined the Cabinet
- Left the Cabinet

Minister	Position before reshuffle	Result of reshuffle
Khairuddin Abdul Hamid	Permanent Secretary (Investment) at the Ministry of Finance and Economy	Became Deputy Minister of Finance and Economy
Abdul Razak Abdul Kadir	Commander of the Royal Brunei Land Force	Became Deputy Minister of Defence
Marzuke Mohsin	Deputy Minister of Development	Left the government
Pengiran Bahrom	Deputy Minister of Religious Affairs	Left the government
Pengiran Mohammad Tashim	Judge of the Syariah Appeal Court (Note: Non-ministerial position)	Became Deputy Minister of Religious Affairs
Pengiran Zety Sufina	Permanent Secretary (Industry) at the Ministry of Finance and Economy	Became Deputy Minister of Finance and Economy
Sufian Sabtu	Permanent Secretary (Safety, Enforcement and Law) at the Prime Minister's Office	Became Deputy Minister at the Prime Minister's Office
Riza Yunos	Permanent Secretary (Media and Cabinet) at the Prime Minister's Office	Became Deputy Minister at the Prime Minister's Office

== Later changes ==
Between the 2018 and 2022 cabinet reshuffles, several minor changes were introduced. The first occurred on 26 February 2023, when the sultan immediately terminated Abdul Razak Abdul Kadir's appointment as deputy minister of defence and director of the Ministry of Defence's Department of Planning and Strategy. From 27 February, the deputy minister of defence position was abolished, and Halbi bin Mohammad Yussof, the minister in the PMO, was appointed acting minister of defence II. Later that year, on 23 October, the sultan ordered the termination of Matsatejo Sokiaw's appointment as deputy minister (energy) at the PMO. From 24 October, Farida Talib was appointed permanent secretary (energy) at the PMO, while Azmi Hanifah succeeded Sokiaw as deputy minister (energy).

Colour key
- Joined the Cabinet
- Left the Cabinet

Minister	Position before reshuffle	Result of reshuffle	Effective from
Abdul Razak Abdul Kadir	Deputy Minister of Defence	Left the government (Note: Abdul Razak left the government before rejoining to become Brunei ambassador to Indonesia on 17 February 2024.)	26 February 2023
Halbi Mohammad Yussof	Minister at the Prime Minister's Office	Became Minister at the Prime Minister's Office and Minister of Defence II	27 February 2023
Matsatejo Sokiaw	Deputy Minister (Energy) at the Prime Minister's Office	Left the government	24 October 2023
Azmi Hanifah	Deputy Managing Director and Commercial Director of Brunei Shell Petroleum (Note: Non-ministerial position)	Became Deputy Minister (Energy) at the Prime Minister's Office	24 October 2023
