= Hisham Hanifah =

Bruneian politician and civil servant (born 1967)

Dato Seri Paduka Hisham Hanifah SPMB DPMB
- هشام حنيفه
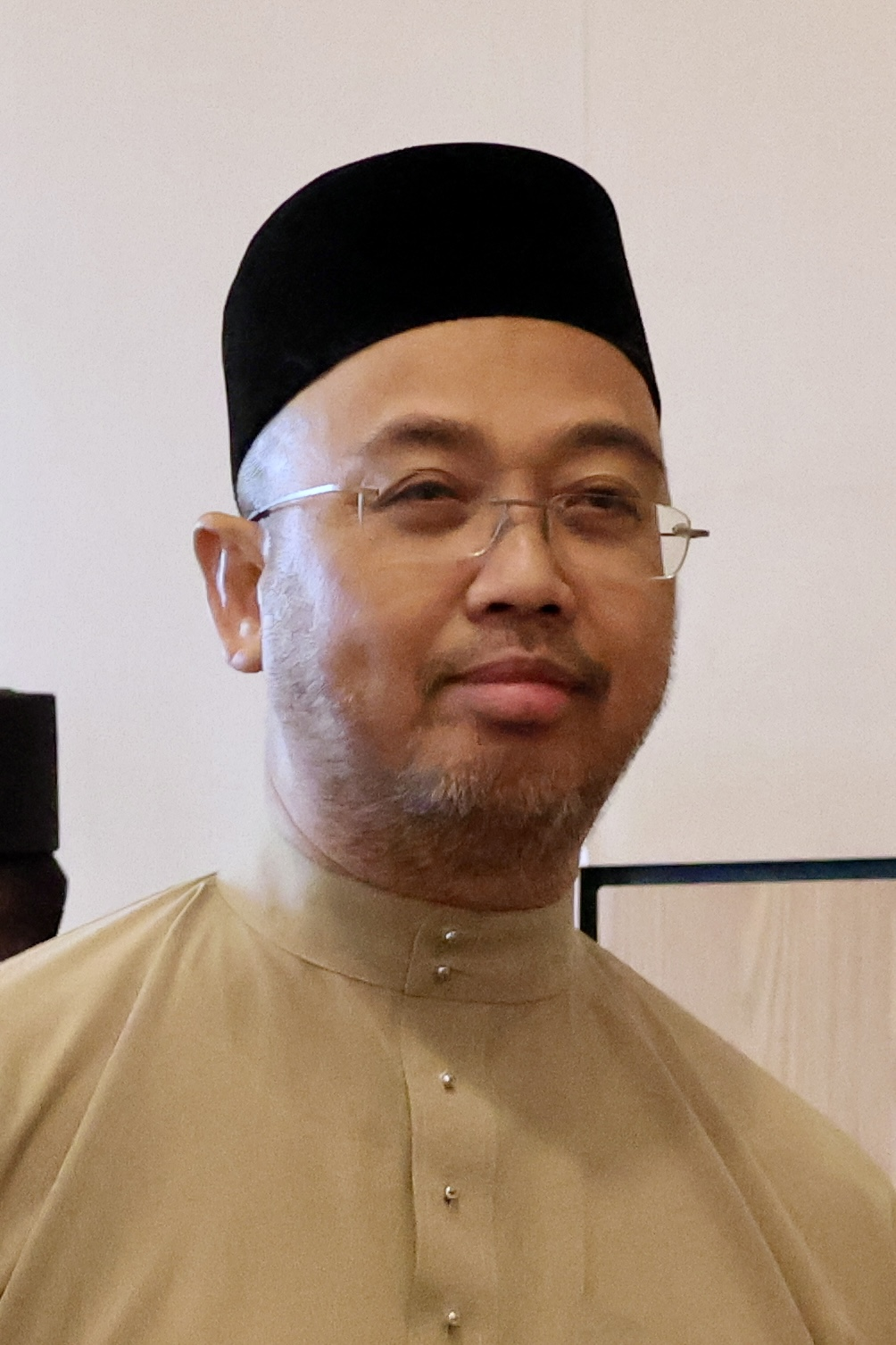
- Hisham in 2024

Deputy Minister of Finance
- In office 22 October 2015 – 30 January 2018 Serving with Amin Liew Abdullah
- Monarch: Hassanal Bolkiah
- Minister: Hassanal Bolkiah; Abdul Rahman Ibrahim
- Preceded by: Bahrin Abdullah
- Succeeded by: Ahmaddin Abdul Rahman

Personal details
- Born: May 1967 (age 59) Brunei
- Relations: Abdul Halim (brother); Mohamad Azmi (brother); Wafi Aminuddin (nephew); Afi Aminuddin (nephew)
- Education: Lancashire Polytechnic (BA)
- Occupation: Politician; civil servant

Hisham bin Haji Mohd Hanifah (born May 1967) or sometimes spelled Hisyam, is a Bruneian politician and civil servant from who was previously appointed as the Deputy Minister of Finance from 2015 to 2018, alongside Amin Liew Abdullah.

== Education and early career ==
Hisham was born in May 1967. In 1991, he received his Bachelor of Arts (Hons) in Accounting from Lancashire Polytechnic in the United Kingdom. Following his August 1991 enlistment in the government, he has held a number of positions. They included an accountant from the Ministry of Finance's Deputy Permanent Secretary, an accountant from the Revenue Division, an accountant from the Treasury Department, and an assistant director of the budget division. He served as the Ministry of Finance's Permanent Secretary (Policy and Investment) before taking on his current role.

== Ministerial career ==
In the 2015 cabinet reshuffle on 22 October, Hisham was appointed deputy minister of finance. He was present in the Malaysian Food Festival, which was organised by Royal Brunei Catering (RBC) and Malaysian Tourism from 6 April to 6 May 2017. His tenure as deputy minister ended after a cabinet reshuffle on 30 January 2018.

== Other positions ==
Hisham holds positions as a committee or board member in various organisations, including the National Security Committee, Institut Teknologi Brunei, Semaun Holdings, Brunei Darussalam Central Bank (BDCB), Khazanah Satu, Royal Brunei Airlines from 2008 to 2018 (RBA). Additionally, he was the chairman of other organisations including RBC, RBA Golf Club, Mulaut Abattoir, Telekom Brunei (Telbru), Makan Ceria, National Syariah Financial Supervisory Board, and the deputy chairman of the investment committee of the Sultan Haji Hassanal Bolkiah Foundation.

== Honours ==
He has earned the following honours:

- Order of Seri Paduka Mahkota Brunei First Class (SPMB; 15 July 2017) – Dato Seri Paduka;
- Order of Seri Paduka Mahkota Brunei Second Class (DPMB; 15 July 2015) – Dato Paduka

Political offices
Preceded by Bahrin Abdullah	Deputy Minister of Finance; 22 October 2015 – 30 January 2018	Succeeded by Ahmaddin Abdul Rahman
