= Abdul Manaf Metussin =

Bruneian politician (born 1966)

Yang Berhormat Dato Seri Paduka Abdul Manaf Metussin SPMB PSNB PKL
- عبد المناف متوسين
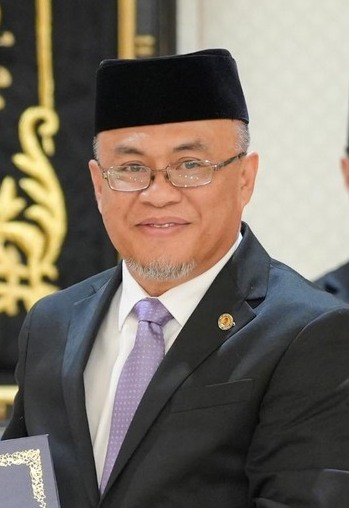
- Abdul Manaf in 2024

5th Ministry of Economy, Trade and Industry
- Incumbent
- Assumed office 7 June 2022
- Monarch: Hassanal Bolkiah
- Preceded by: Ali Apong

Chairman of Royal Brunei Airlines
- In office 4 January 2021 – 18 January 2023
- Preceded by: Amin Liew Abdullah
- Succeeded by: Juanda Abdul Rashid

Deputy Minister of Finance and Economy
- In office 20 September 2018 – 7 June 2022 Serving with Ahmaddin Abdul Rahman
- Minister: Hassanal Bolkiah; Amin Liew Abdullah
- Preceded by: Hisham Hanifah; Amin Liew Abdullah
- Succeeded by: Khairuddin Abdul Hamid; Pengiran Zety Sufina

Personal details
- Born: October 1966 (age 59–60) Brunei
- Spouse: Norlila Abdul Jalil
- Education: University of Leeds; University of Bradford (MSc); Canterbury Business School (PhD)
- Occupation: Politician and businessperson
- Cabinet: Cabinet of Brunei

Abdul Manaf bin Haji Metussin (born October 1966) is a Bruneian politician who currently serves as the Minister Ministry of Economy, Trade and Industry (METI) since 2022. Additionally, he formerly held the position of Deputy Minister of Finance and Economy from 2018 to 2022, and chairman of Royal Brunei Airlines from 2021 to 2023.

== Education ==
Abdul Manaf was born in October 1966 and holds a Bruneian nationality. He graduated from the University of Leeds with honours degree in mechanical engineering and later earned his Master of Science degree in Manufacturing Systems Engineering from the University of Bradford. Moreover, he obtained a PhD in Management from Canterbury Business School.

== Political career ==
On 4 May 2016, Royal Brunei Airlines (RBA) appointed him as the director of the company. In a speech during the 10th Heart of Borneo Trilateral Meeting in Brunei, Abdul Manaf urged the business sector to support ecotourism and biodiversity through the HoB Initiative. The idea of attaining sustainable development among HoB member nations is one of the topics covered during the summit, which lasts from 4 to 7 September. He was appointed Deputy Minister of Finance and Economy on 20 September 2018, and participated in an oath-taking ceremony later that year on 2 October.

On 4 January 2021, Abdul Manaf was appointed the Chairman of RBA after an announcement made by Sultan Hassanal Bolkiah. Due to the cabinet reshuffle on 7 June 2022, he has been newly appointed to replace Ali Apong as the Minister of Primary Resources and Tourism.

On 26 October 2022, through video conference, Dato Abdul Manaf attended the 44th Meeting of the ASEAN Ministers on Agriculture and Forestry (the 44th AMAF Meeting). In light of COVID-19's effects, the Minister emphasized the significance of ASEAN's attention to economic recovery and digital economy integration, particularly with regard to issues relating to food crises, increases in the price of food and agricultural inputs, which have resulted in an increase in the cost of logistics and production.

The Mandatory Reporting Directive, which would be implemented at the end of 2022 and require Brunei's major stakeholders to disclose their emissions to the Brunei Climate Change Secretariat, was one of the measures Abdul Manaf proposed for Brunei at the international level. In terms of ASEAN, through this project and with the assistance of the UN Secretariat, Brunei and the Philippines have had the chance to jointly develop the ASEAN Climate Finance Strategy's framework.

According to Abdul Manaf, on 16 March 2023, in response to questions from a member of the Legislative Council (LegCo), the production of Brunei's agriculture and fishery sectors increased from B$781 million in 2021 to B$857 million in 2022. Production is predicted to reach 1 billion Brunei dollars (US$740 million) in the coming years. In an attempt to become a globally recognised ecotourism destination, Brunei is stepping up its efforts to provide visitors with immersive experiences in the pristine nature, dynamic culture, and engaging adventure activities of the nation. Abdul Manaf stated this in his keynote speech during the roundtable discussion on 28 October 2023, under the topic "Tourism Pillar Promoting Sustainable Tourism in BIMP-EAGA Challenges and Opportunities."

A delegation from Brunei was led by Abdul Manaf to the 27th Meeting of ASEAN Tourism Ministers (27th M-ATM) and Related Meetings, which was held in Vientiane, Laos from 23 to 26 January 2024, in association with the ASEAN Tourism Forum 2024 (ATF 2024). Kuala Belait was recognised on 26 January at the ASEAN Tourism Standards Awards event as the fourth ASEAN Clean Tourist City.

During the 20th session of the LegCo meeting on 5 March 2024, Abdul Manaf stated that the MPRT has planned a number of initiatives to expand the tourist sector. The Brunei December Festival (BDF) and the "Kenali Negara Kitani" (KNK) program, which promotes regional tourism goods, are two of the efforts. He acknowledged the ASEAN–China Center's (ACC) pivotal role in bringing China and ASEAN's tourism cooperation to life and pledged to produce more concrete results of their collaboration with the ACC's assistance.

== Personal life ==
Abdul Manaf is married to Datin Paduka Dr Hjh Norlila Dato Hj Abdul Jalil, former Permanent Secretary at the Ministry of Health.

== Awards and honours ==
=== Awards ===
- ASEAN Federation of Engineering Organisations (AFEO) Distinguished Honorary Patron

=== Honours ===
- Order of Seri Paduka Mahkota Brunei First Class (SPMB) – Dato Seri Paduka
- Order of Setia Negara Brunei First Class (PSNB) – Dato Seri Setia
- Order of Setia Negara Brunei Third Class (SNB; 15 July 2017)
- Long Service Medal (PKL)
- Sultan of Brunei Golden Jubilee Medal (5 October 2017)

Political offices
Preceded by Ali Apong	5th Minister of Primary Resources and Tourism; 7 June 2022 – present	Incumbent
Preceded by Hisham Mohd Hanifah; Amin Liew Abdullah	Deputy Minister of Finance and Economy; 20 September 2018 – 7 June 2022	Succeeded by Khairuddin Abdul Hamid; Pengiran Zety Sufina
Business positions
Preceded by Amin Liew Abdullah	Chairman of Royal Brunei Airlines; 4 January 2021 – 18 January 2023	Succeeded by Juanda Abdul Rashid
