= Nazmi Mohamad =

Bruneian politician (born 1966)

Yang Berhormat Dato Seri Setia Nazmi Mohamad PSNB PKL
- نظمي محمد
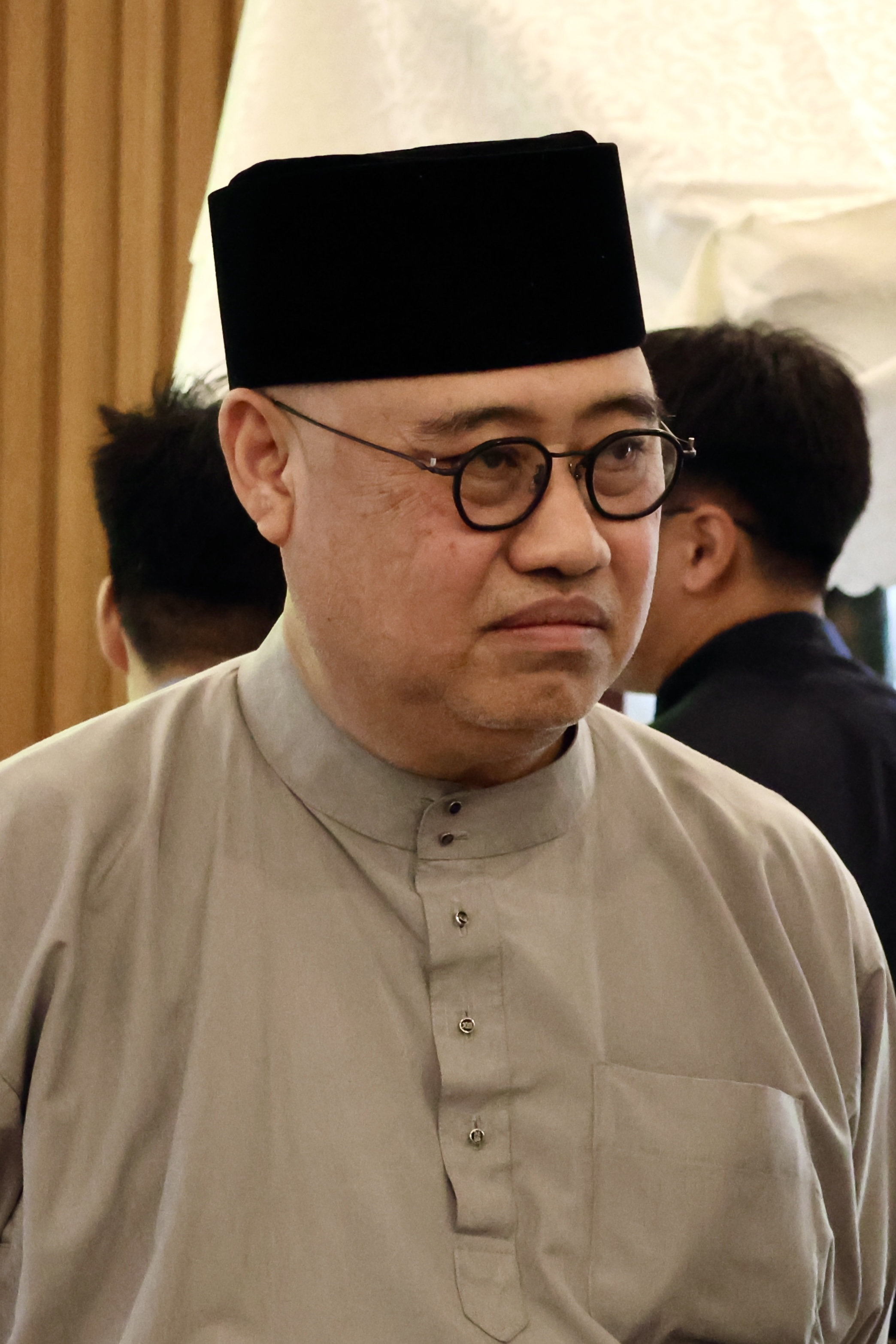
- Nazmi in 2024

8th Minister of Culture, Youth and Sports
- Incumbent
- Assumed office 7 June 2022
- Monarch: Hassanal Bolkiah
- Preceded by: Aminuddin Ihsan

Personal details
- Born: 1966 (age 59–60) Brunei
- Spouse: Binanun Bungsu
- Children: 5
- Parents: Mohammad Ismail (father); Amanah Mohammad Harith (mother)
- Education: Universiti Brunei Darussalam
- Profession: Politician; civil servant

Nazmi bin Haji Mohamad (born 1966) is a politician and civil servant who hold the position of Minister of Culture, Youth and Sports since 2022.

== Education ==
He immediately started work with the Brunei government after graduating from Universiti Brunei Darussalam in 1991.

== Political career ==
Nazmi became the Deputy Permanent Secretary, Ministry of Foreign Affairs and Trade (MOFAT) and Director of the Budget Division in the Ministry of Finance (MoF), in 2007 and 2008 respectively, but soon after reappointed to his previous position as MOFAT's Deputy Permanent Secretary. He holds several other positions in 2012; Alternate Governor of the Asian Development Bank (ADB), Chairman of the Islamic Financial Supervisory Board, Chairman of the Brunei Darussalam Deposit Protection Corporation, Joint Deputy Chairman of the Employees Trust Fund, Deputy Chairman of the Center for Strategic and Policy Studies (CSPS), and lastly the Permanent Secretary at the MoF's Management and International in the Temburong District.

In 2014, he became a Member of the Brunei Economic Development Board (BEDB) and represented Brunei Darussalam in the ASEAN Intergovernmental Commission on Human Rights (AICHR). Moreover, Nazmi was appointed the Permanent Secretary (Corporate Affairs and Public Administration) for the MoF at the Prime Minister's Office.

Following a cabinet reshuffle on 7 June 2022, Nazmi was appointed as Minister of Culture, Youth and Sports. It was only announced following a cabinet reshuffle, succeeding Aminuddin Ihsan who has been holding that position since 2018. His appointment as the new minister was congratulated by Japan's Ambassador Maeda, and hoped for more collaborations to tighten the relations of Brunei and Japan.

== Personal life ==
Dato Nazmi is married to Datin Hajah Binanun binti Haji Bungsu, and together they have 5 children; 3 sons and 2 daughters.

== Honours ==
- Order of Setia Negara Brunei First Class (PSNB; 15 July 2022) – Dato Seri Setia
- Long Service Medal (PKL; 4 July 2016)

Political offices
Preceded by Aminuddin Ihsan	9th Minister of Culture, Youth and Sports; 7 June 2022 – present	Succeeded by Incumbent
