= Brunei Darussalam Central Bank =

Central Bank of Brunei

Coordinates: 4.9226°N 114.9516°E

Brunei Darussalam Central Bank Bank Pusat Brunei Darussalam
- Headquarters: Level 14, Ministry of Finance and Economy Building, Bandar Seri Begawan, Brunei BB3910
- Established: 1 January 2011; 15 years ago
- Ownership: Government of Brunei
- Chairman: Khairuddin Abdul Hamid
- Central bank of: Brunei
- Currency: Brunei dollar (B$); BND (ISO 4217)
- Reserves: 2 890 million USD
- Preceded by: Brunei Currency and Monetary Board
- Website: www.bdcb.gov.bn

The Brunei Darussalam Central Bank (abbrev: BDCB; Malay: Bank Pusat Brunei Darussalam) is the central bank of Brunei. In addition to creating the Brunei currency and managing the nation's monetary policy, its major goals consisted of building and upholding domestic price stability, guaranteeing the stability of the financial system, particularly via the creation of prudential standards and financial regulations, and support the establishment and operation of effective.

== History ==
The Brunei Currency Board (BCB) was established on 12 June 1967, and the introduction of the Brunei dollar as the new currency of Brunei in replacing the Malaya and British Borneo dollar after the Currency Union Agreement between Malaysia, Singapore and Brunei was terminated and all three countries issued their own currencies which continued to be interchangeable until 8 May 1973, when Malaysia terminated the agreement with Singapore and Brunei. The Currency Interchangeability Agreement between Singapore and Brunei is still existent. On 27 June 2007, Singapore and Brunei celebrated the 40th anniversary of the Currency Interchangeability Agreement (since 12 June 1967) with the joint-issue of the commemorative $20 notes.

The BCB was dissolved and rechartered under the new name the Brunei Currency and Monetary Board (BCMB) pursuant to Section 3-1 of the Currency and Monetary Order, 2004 on 1 February 2004. The Minister of Finance serves as the board's chair and is in charge of managing BCMB. In addition to leading BCMB's management, the chief executive officer serves as the board secretary. In honour of the Sultan of Brunei's 58th birthday, BCMB has released new B$50 and B$100 polymer notes with more security measures than earlier versions.

The Brunei Darussalam Central Bank Order, 2010 established the Monetary Authority of Brunei Darussalam (Autoriti Monetari Brunei Darussalam) which went into effect on 1 January 2011. In addition to developing and implementing monetary policies, the AMBD will oversee financial institutions and handle money in its capacity as a central bank. The Crown Prince Al-Muhtadee Billah serves as the AMBD's chair. At the 3rd AMBD-MAS Bilateral Roundtable, on 22 January 2020, AMBD and the MAS signed an updated Memorandum of Understanding (MoU) on bilateral collaboration, pledging to pursue additional areas of collaboration.

Following approval by Sultan Hassanal Bolkiah, the official Radio Television Brunei announced the name change to Brunei Darussalam Central Bank (BDCB) and board selections on 26 June 2021. On the following day, new laws pertaining to the central bank went into force. The central bank would carry out the same duties as its predecessor, and whose responsibilities included supervising financial institutions and developing and implementing monetary policies.

On 6 December 2022, the managing directors of BOT and BDCB signed a MoU on cooperation between the two central banks. To strengthen their collaboration in the areas of banking and insurance supervision, the managing directors MAS and BDCB signed a MoU on 3 February 2023. Through information sharing and cross-border on-site inspections, the MoU will enable the efficient supervision of banks and insurers operating in both jurisdictions. After signing the second additional pages of the MoU on Cooperation in Regional Payment Connectivity (MOU RPC) on 29 February 2024, BDCB and BOL have formally joined the Regional Payment Connectivity (RPC).

== Senior leadership ==
- Chairman: Haji Khairuddin bin Haji Abdul Hamid (since 17 July 2022)
- Deputy Chairman: Pengiran Hajah Zety Sufina binti Pengiran Haji Sani (since 8 August 2022)
- Managing Director: Hajah Rokiah binti Haji Badar (since 17 October 2019)

=== List of former chairmen ===
- Sultan Hassanal Bolkiah (2004–2011)
- Crown Prince Al-Muhtadee Billah (2011–2021)
- Haji Ahmaddin bin Haji Abdul Rahman (2021–2022)

=== List of former managing directors ===
- Haji Mohd Rosli bin Haji Sabtu (2011–2015)
- Yusof bin Haji Abdul Rahman (2015–2019)

== See also ==
- Ministry of Finance and Economy (Brunei)
- List of central banks
- List of financial supervisory authorities by country
