= Al-Muhtadee Billah =

Heir apparent to the Bruneian throne (born 1974)

- Pengiran Muda Mahkota
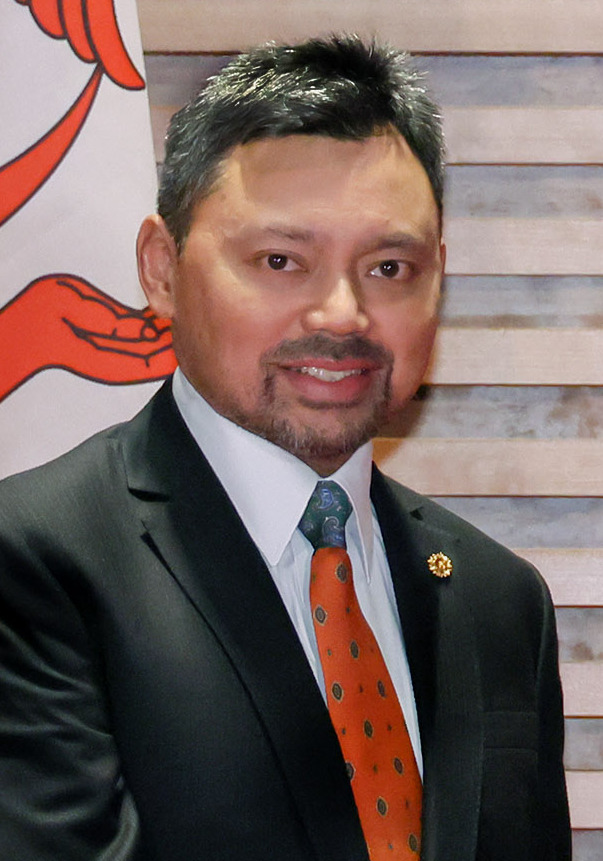
- Al-Muhtadee Billah in 2024

Senior Minister at the Prime Minister's Office
- Incumbent
- Assumed office 24 May 2005
- Monarch: Hassanal Bolkiah
- Prime Minister: Hassanal Bolkiah

Crown Prince of Brunei
- Tenure: 10 August 1998 – present
- Predecessor: Hassanal Bolkiah
- Born: 17 February 1974 (age 52); Istana Darul Hana, Bandar Seri Begawan, Brunei
- Spouse: Princess Sarah (m. 2004)
- Issue: Prince Abdul Muntaqim; Princess Muneerah Madhul; Prince Muhammad Aiman; Princess Faathimah
Regnal name
- Pengiran Muda Haji Al-Muhtadee Billah ibni Paduka Seri Baginda Sultan Haji Hassanal Bolkiah Mu'izzaddin Waddaulah
- House: Bolkiah
- Father: Sultan Hassanal Bolkiah
- Mother: Queen Saleha
- Religion: Sunni Islam
- Education: Paduka Seri Begawan Sultan Science College; Magdalen College, Oxford; Oxford Centre for Islamic Studies
- Military career
- Allegiance: Brunei
- Branch: Royal Brunei Armed Forces
- Years of active service: 2004–present
- Rank: General

Al-Muhtadee Billah ibni Hassanal Bolkiah (Jawi: المهتدي بالله ابن حسن البلقية; born 17 February 1974) is the eldest son of Sultan Hassanal Bolkiah and his wife Queen Saleha. He is the crown prince of Brunei Darussalam, and is first in the line of succession to the Bruneian throne. He is expected to eventually lead the state and government, and is regarded as the second most significant figure in the political hierarchy.

== Early life and education ==
Prince Muda (Prince) Al-Muhtadee Billah was born at Istana Darul Hana, Bandar Seri Begawan during the reign of his father on 17 February 1974. He is the first-born son, and thus heir to the throne of Brunei. His early schooling was at the Putera Puteri School at Istana Darul Hana. He received his primary education at St. Andrew's School. He finished reading the "surah-surah Lazim" and the Quran in 1988. Subsequently, he progressed through the Brunei Junior Certificate of Education (BJCE) in 1988, and the General Certificate of Education (GCE) Ordinary Level exam in 1991 while he was studying at the Paduka Seri Begawan Sultan Science College. He was further educated at Emanuel School in London. He passed his GCE Advanced Level exams in 1994.

Al-Muhtadee Billah attended tutorials at the Universiti Brunei Darussalam (UBD), and began his overseas education at the Oxford Centre for Islamic Studies in October 1995. He matriculated for admission to University of Oxford's Foreign Service Programme at Magdalen College, Oxford, where he graduated in 1997. During his two years at Oxford, the heir was known as "Mr. Omar Hassan," allowing him to live anonymously and enjoy a typical student social life. While at Oxford, he followed a programme of study specially designed for him involving Islamic studies, trade, diplomacy, and international relations. He received his diploma in Diplomatics in a special convocation held on 3 August 1998 in Bandar Seri Begawan.

== Crown Prince ==
=== Early appointments and duties ===
Al-Muhtadee Billah was proclaimed Crown Prince of Brunei on 10 August 1998 at the Istana Nurul Iman. At the ceremony, his father, the Sultan of Brunei, bestowed upon him the 'Keris Si Naga'. This conferred him in line to become the 30th Sultan of Brunei. The ceremony was followed by the procession around the capital, Bandar Seri Begawan.

The Public Service Department, Public Service Commission, Immigration Department, Labor Department, Ministry of Finance, Ministry of Health, Ministry of Communications, Ministry of Culture, Youth and Sports, Ministry of Religious Affairs, and Datastream Technology Communications (DST) are just a few of the government agencies that Al-Muhtadee Billah has been attached to while he prepares to become the future head of state and head of statehood. The purpose of the attachments is to provide him with as much exposure to the nation's operations as possible.

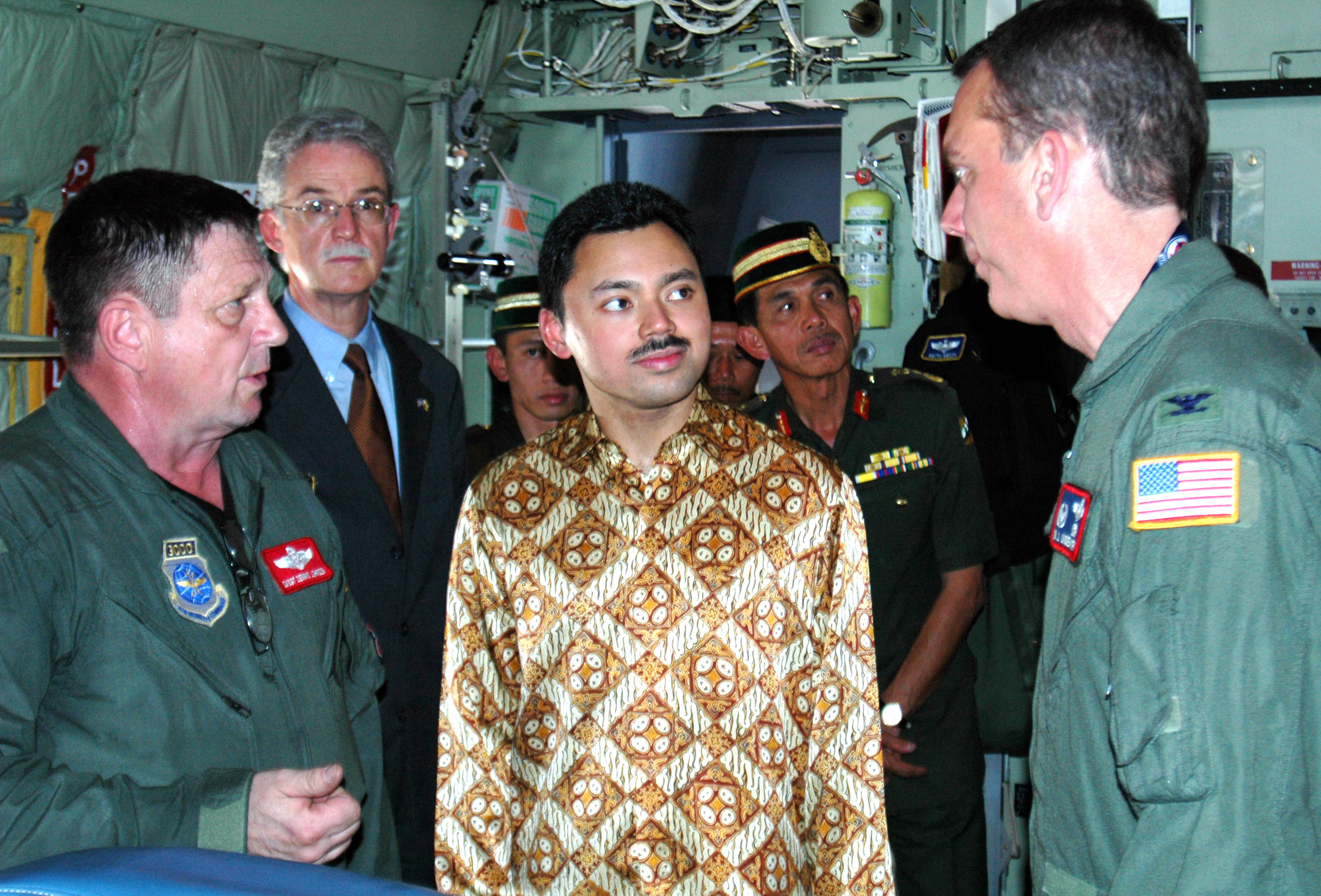
Al-Muhtadee Billah visiting a C-130J Hercules in 2005

Al-Muhtadee Billah also holds positions as a general in the Royal Brunei Armed Forces (RBAF) since 2004, the deputy inspector general of the Royal Brunei Police Force (RBPF) since 2005, and senior minister in the Prime Minister's Office (PMO) since 24 May 2005. He gives audiences to foreign ambassadors and high commissioners, acts as deputy sultan while his father is away, and attends more formal events in order to improve his public speaking skills when giving sabda (crown prince royal speeches). He also serves as the pro-chancellor of Universiti Brunei Darussalam (UBD) since 16 September 1998; Universiti Islam Sultan Sharif Ali (UNISSA); and Universiti Teknologi Brunei (UTB).

In the 2005 Bruneian cabinet reshuffle on 24 May, Al-Muhtadee Billah was appointed senior minister at the Prime Minister's Office. Additionally, he is the chairman of the board of directors for Brunei Shell Joint Venture (BSJV) Companies from 2018 to 2024, the chairman of the Wawasan Brunei Supreme Council since 2014, the chairman of Autoriti Monetari Brunei Darussalam (AMBD) from 2011 to 2020, and the royal patron of the Heart of Borneo National Council in Brunei since 2011. In addition, he has served as the National Disaster Management Council's (NDMC) chairman from 2006 to 2018, the chairman of the Manpower Planning Council from 2015 to 2019, the chief scout of the Persekutuan Pengakap Negara Brunei Darussalam (PPNBD) from 2013 to 2018, and the patron of the Temburong District Development Authority since 2018.

=== Engagements in foreign relations ===
An annual highlight of the Singapore–Brunei Young Leaders' Programme (YLP) was Al-Muhtadee Billah's state visits to Singapore. 2019 sees him meet dignitaries and state officials, including President Halimah Yacob and Prime Minister Lee Hsien Loong. These visits also solidify the two countries' close relationship. He also paid visits to government buildings and notable locations, including Changi Naval Base, Our Tampines Hub, and Victoria School.

While expressing satisfaction with the United Nations' (UN) efforts, Al-Muhtadee Billah underlined the need for structural changes to reflect the globalised world during the general debate of the sixty-seventh session of the UN General Assembly. He emphasised the significance of reaching a regional agreement, using the ASEAN's strategy as an illustration. He also listed three major areas in which the UN is essential to building a brighter future that is marked by optimism, assurance, and trust for everyone.

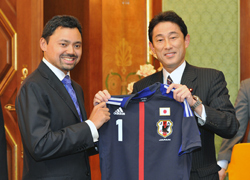
Fumio Kishida meeting Al-Muhtadee Billah in 2013

Al-Muhtadee Billah was awarded the title of Honorary Member of Special Forces Regiment, RBAF on 4 November 2013, in recognition of his leadership, involvement, and contributions to the growth of the RBAF since his father had conferred the rank of General of the RBAF on him on 25 March 2004. Later on 13 November 2013, he visited the Sri Iskandar Camp, Johor and received an honorary Green Beret. General Zulkifeli Mohd Zin gave the award during a ceremony held on the parade area of the camp. He gave the Chief of the 21st Special Service Group (21 GGK) a plaque, and he was then given a guard of honour at the 21 GGK Parade Square.

On 3 May 2014, Al-Muhtadee Billah paid a visit to Indonesia's Special Forces Command (Kopassus), where he was bestowed with the title of Honorary Member. In a sabda, he acknowledged the strong bilateral ties between Brunei and Indonesia, particularly in the area of defense cooperation, and thanked Kopassus for the invitation during the audience. He went to the meeting room where Major General Agus Sutomo was giving a briefing. Al-Muhtadee Billah was met with a guard of honour upon arriving at Kesatrian Marinir Hartono on 6 May 2014, together with Admiral Marsetio and Major General A. Faridz Washington. He first attended a conferment ceremony when he was named an honorary member of the Indonesian Marine Corps, followed by an honorary beret and badge from Major General Faridz.

Deputy Prime Minister Teo Chee Hean invited Al-Muhtadee Billah to come to Singapore for a five-day official visit as part of the Singapore–Brunei YLP from 1 to 5 September 2014. In addition to driving the improved Light Strike Vehicle (LSV) Mark-II and witnessing live shooting displays, he received the SAF's Honorary Advanced Combat Skills Badge during his visit. His visit highlights the unique and established defence cooperation between Brunei and Singapore, which is emphasised by frequent encounters through visits, bilateral exercises, and professional exchanges.

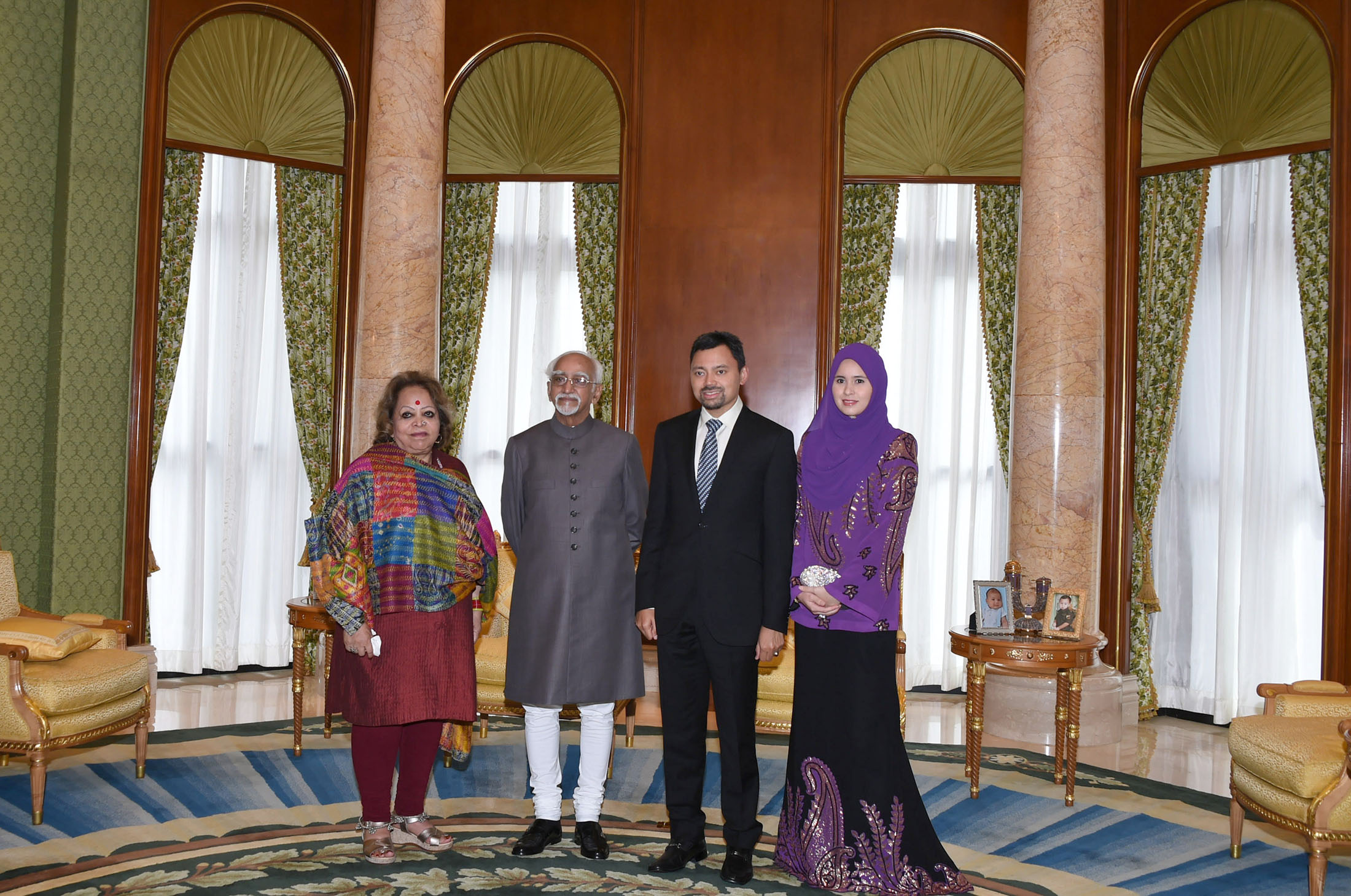
Mohammad Hamid Ansari with Al-Muhtadee Billah and Pengiran Anak Sarah in 2016

Al-Muhtadee Billah stated during the NDMC meeting on 10 October 2016, that a nationwide strategy is required to stop the Zika virus from spreading since public support for government initiatives depends on shared responsibility. He underlined that for government initiatives like fogging and fumigation to be successful, the community must be actively involved. He thanked Allah for sparing Brunei from the global health crisis and emphasised the council's responsibility in educating the people and fostering readiness.

In honour of the 50th anniversary of the Currency Interchangeability Agreement (CIA), Al-Muhtadee Billah and Teo Chee Hean launched a special exhibition named "Abode of Peace & the Lion City: A Brunei-Singapore Exhibition" has opened at the art gallery at the Dermaga Diraja Bandar Seri Begawan on 4 November 2017. The exhibition in Bandar Seri Begawan, and it features coins, notes, and stamps that mark the milestone. The Ministry of Culture, Youth, and Sports of Brunei and the Singapore Philatelic Museum collaborated on the two-part exhibition's curation.

Al-Muhtadee Billah highlighted the need of cooperation between the public and private sectors in discovering economic possibilities and assisting firms in navigating the COVID-19 epidemic during the recent ASEAN Business Awards (ABA) 2021 opening session, which was conducted via video recording. He underlined how crucial the private sector has been to the region's economic recovery and stressed the value of initiatives like the ABA, the ASEAN Business and Investment Summit, and the ASEAN Business Roundtables in promoting cooperation between the public and private sectors. He also mentioned how quickly developing technologies are changing the face of the economy.

== Charity work ==
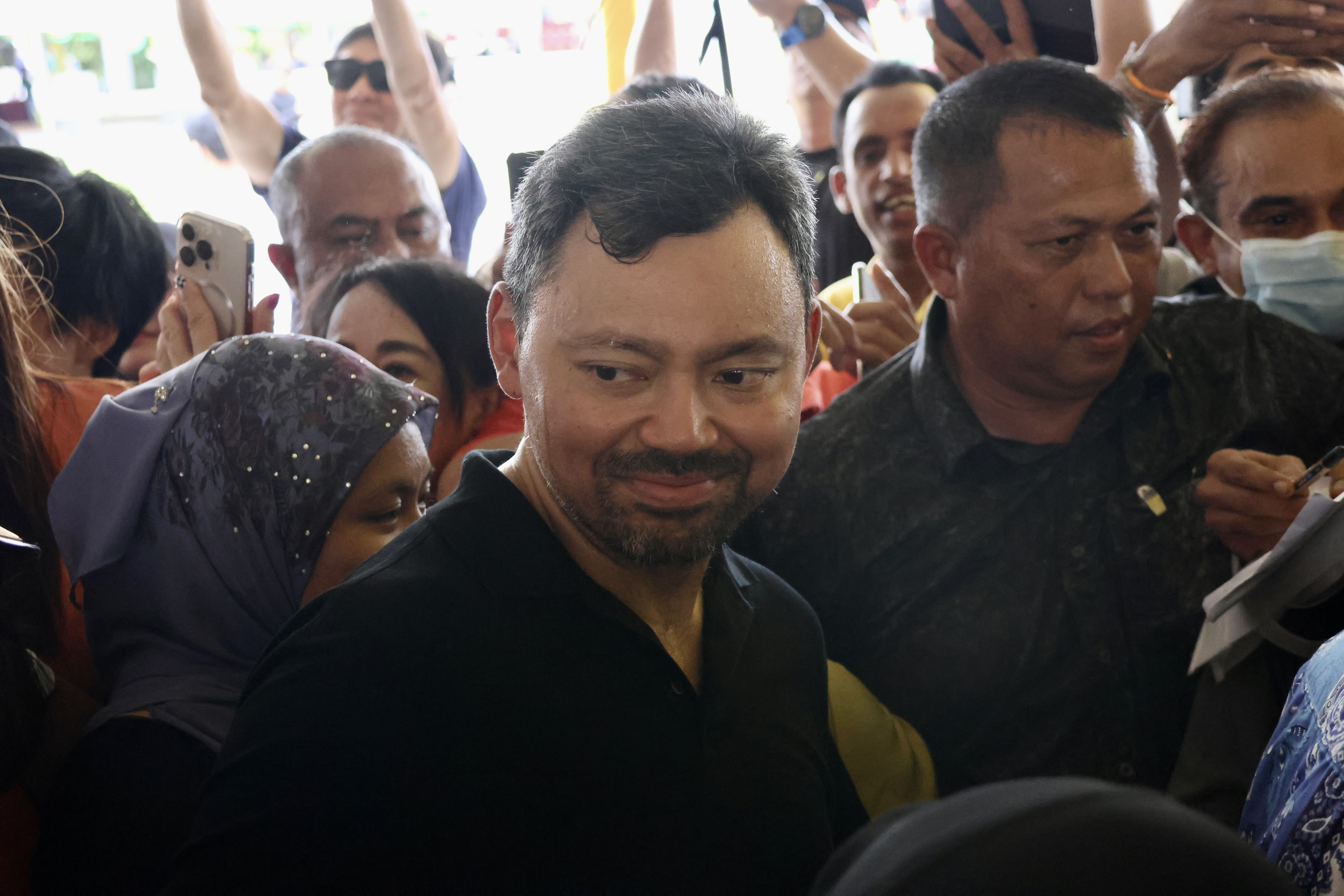
Al-Muhtadee Billah on his 2023 visit to the Belait District, seen greeting the populace

The Dana Pengiran Muda Mahkota Al-Muhtadee Billah for Orphans (DANA) Act (Chapter 185) commanded Sultan Hassanal Bolkiah to create the DANA. Al-Muhtadee Billah has given permission for the DANA to be introduced at the Jerudong Polo Club on 25 August 1998. The formal presentation and launch of the DANA Account, which happened at the Berakas International Convention Center (ICC) on 30 August 1999. Various government and private sector organisations, financial institutions, business and industry associations, groups, and private people have made their contributions to the DANA before Al-Muhtadee Billah in connection with the DANA's debut. Three contributors gave B$75,381 to DANA on 2 April 2024, during a ceremony held in the multipurpose hall of the Yayasan Sultan Haji Hassanal Bolkiah Complex.

In honour of Hari Raya Aidilfitri, Sultan Hassanal Bolkiah has given his permission to once again provide the His Majesty's Personal Gifts (Kurnia) to 4,651 beneficiaries countrywide who are special needs, orphans, the poor, and beneficiaries of Monthly Welfare Assistance. The presentation of the personal gifts by the Sultan's sons, acting as his personal representatives, kicked off the ceremony. This was followed by the simultaneous distribution at many locations across all four districts. Al-Muhtadee Billah agreed to give the individual presents to a several thousand recipients from the districts at every yearly events.

== Personal life ==
=== Interests ===
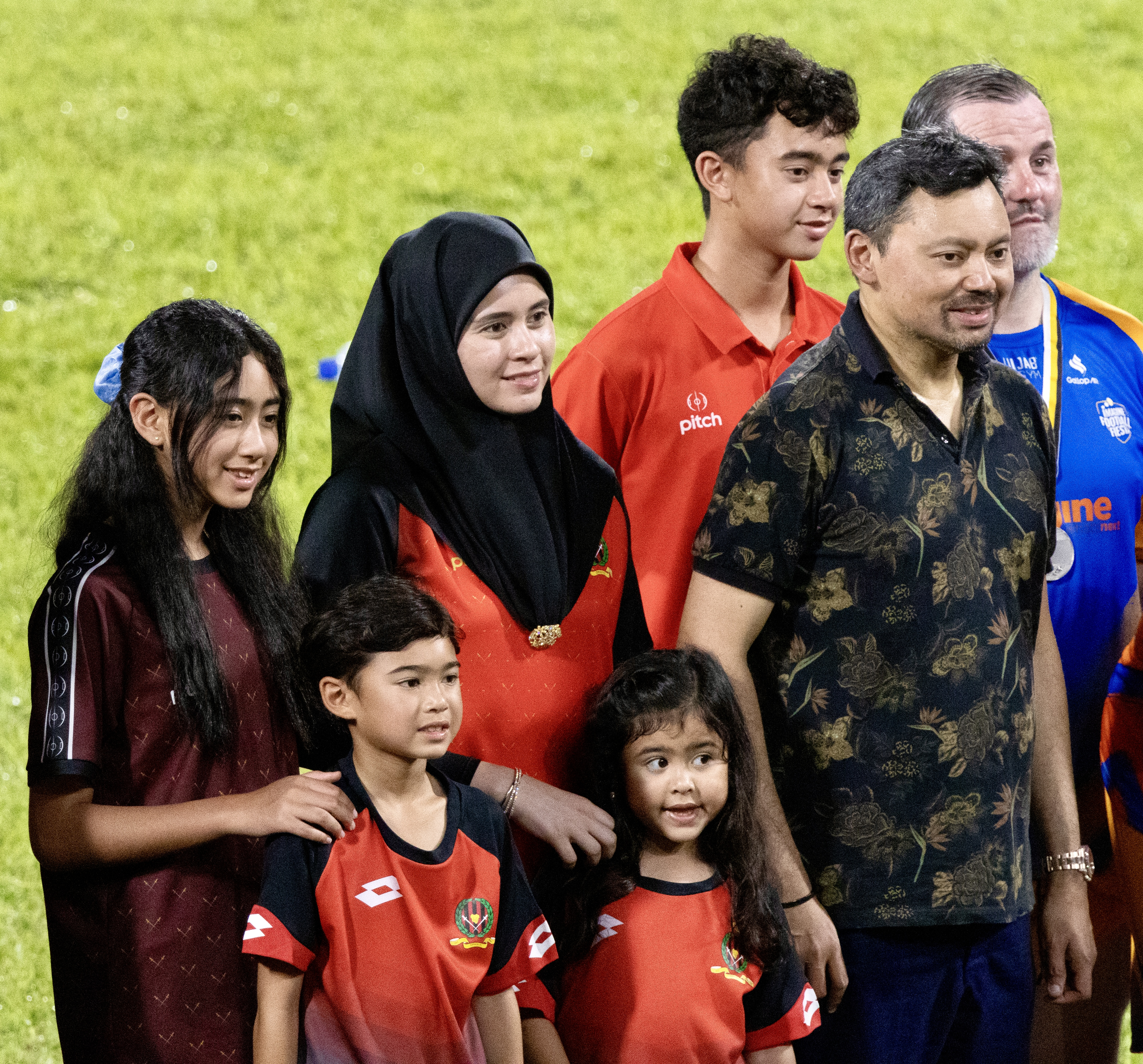
Al-Muhtadee Billah and his family at an association football friendly match in 2024

He is a pool and snooker enthusiast, and participated in the 2006 WPA Men's World Nine-ball Championship, and later the 2008 WPA World Eight-ball Championship. The 2007 World Pool Championship was launched on 10 October at the Sofitel Philippine Plaza Hotel in Manila; Al-Muhtadee Billah represented Brunei in the tournament at the Araneta Coliseum from 3 to 11 November.

A football club, the Brunei DPMM FC, is owned by Prince Al-Muhtadee Billah, who previously played as a goalkeeper for the team.

Al-Muhtadee Billah also has a fleet of vehicles that includes a Ferrari 599 GTB, Mercedes McLaren SLR, and Lamborghini Murcielago LP640. Additionally, he is reported to be quiet and religious.

=== Marriage and children ===
On 9 September 2004, Al-Muhtadee Billah married 17-year-old Pengiran Anak Sarah at Istana Nurul Iman in Bandar Seri Begawan. Guests included the Duke of Gloucester, the Crown Prince of Japan, the Yang di-Pertuan Agong of Malaysia, Princes Bandar bin Sultan and Saud bin Faisal of Saudi Arabia, the King of Bahrain, and several Malaysian sultans. The wedding was also attended by heads of state and government from Singapore, Thailand, Malaysia, Indonesia, and the Philippines. The wedding included a bersanding ceremony, and a drive around Bandar Seri Begawan in a golden-topped Rolls-Royce.

The royal couple have four children. Their first child and future heir to the Brunei throne, Prince Abdul Muntaqim, was born on 17 March 2007 at the Raja Isteri Pengiran Anak Saleha Hospital. Their second child, a daughter, Pengiran Anak Muneerah Madhul Bolkiah, was born on 2 January 2011. Pengiran Anak Sarah gave birth to their third child and second son, Pengiran Muda Muhammad Aiman on 7 June 2015. Their fourth child and second daughter, Pengiran Anak Faathimah Az-Zahraa' Raihaanul Bolkiah, was born at 15:54, on 1 December 2017.

name	born	place of birth	age
Pengiran Muda Abdul Muntaqim	17 March 2007	Raja Isteri Pengiran Anak Saleha Hospital, Brunei	19 years, 7 months
Pengiran Anak Muneerah Madhul Bolkiah	2 January 2011	Istana Nurul Iman, Brunei	15 years, 10 months
Pengiran Muda Muhammad Aiman	7 June 2015	Istana Nurul Iman, Brunei	11 years, 5 months
Pengiran Anak Faathimah Az-Zahraa' Raihaanul Bolkiah	1 December 2017	Istana Nurul Iman, Brunei	8 years, 11 months

== Bibliography ==
- Token of gratitude from the people (Tanda Kesyukuran Dari Rakyat). 20 February 1974.
- Son and heir for Brunei Sultan. Bernard Long.
- al-Muhtadee Billah (2004). Curahan kasih = Affectionate expression (in Malay). Bandar Seri Begawan. OCLC 298379085.

== Titles, styles and honours ==
=== Titles and styles ===
Styles of The Prince of Brunei
- Reference style: His Royal Highness
- Spoken style: Your Royal Highness
- Alternative style: Duli Tuanku

- Since 10 August 1998: Duli Yang Teramat Mulia Paduka Seri Pengiran Muda Mahkota Haji Al Muhtadee Billah ibn. Sultan Haji Hassanal Bolkiah Mu'izzadin Wad'daulah

=== Namesakes ===
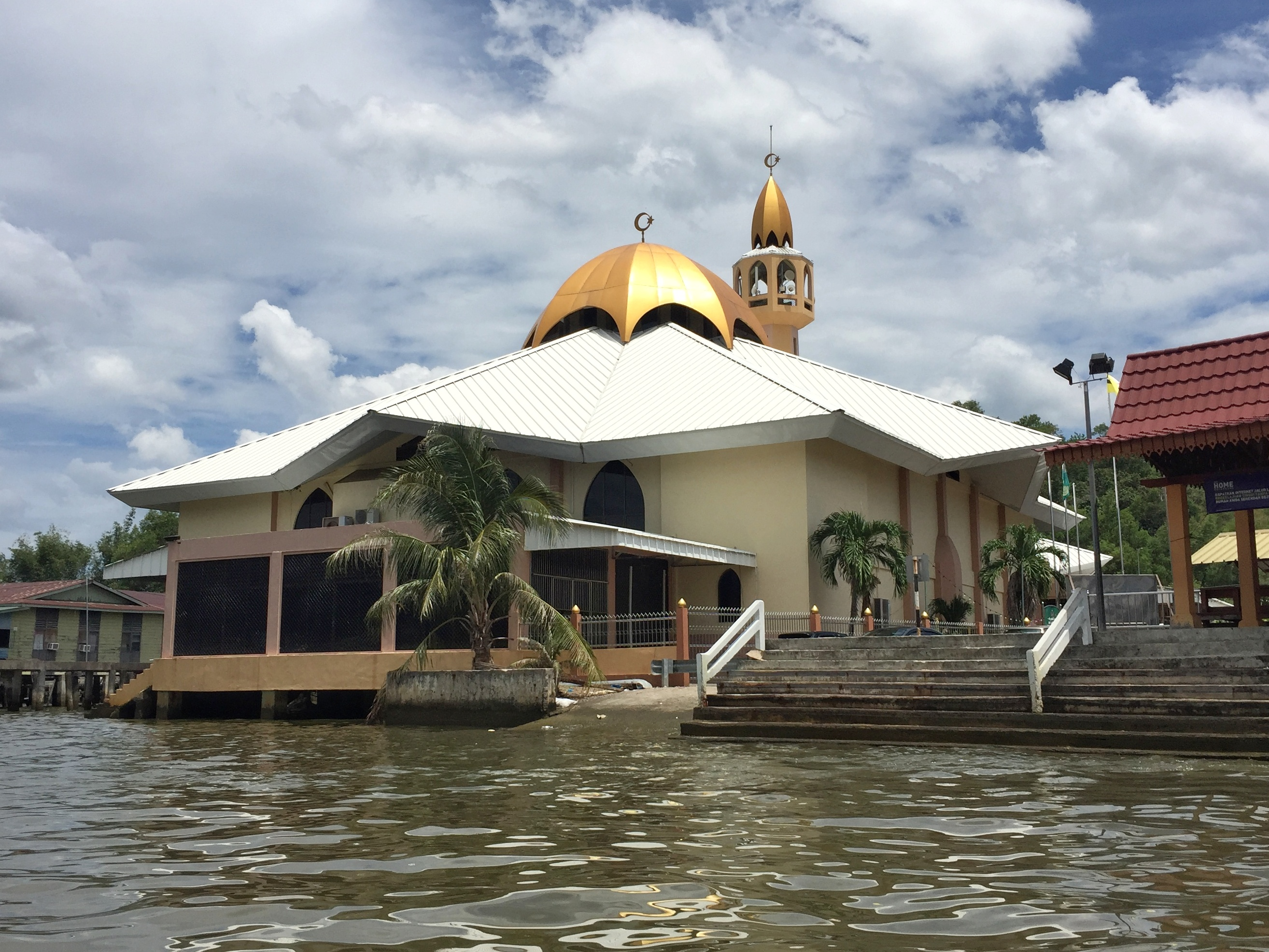
Al-Muhtadee Billah Mosque

- Duli Pengiran Muda Al-Muhtadee Billah College, a college established in Gadong in 1974.
- Jalan Putera Al-Muhtadee Billah, a road in Bandar Seri Begawan.
- Al-Muhtadee Billah Mosque, a mosque opened in Kampong Sungai Kebun on 17 July 1987.
- Duli Pengiran Muda Mahkota Pengiran Muda Haji Al-Muhtadee Billah Mosque, a mosque opened in Kampong Tamoi on 16 January 1999.
- Pengiran Muda Mahkota Pengiran Muda Haji Al-Muhtadee Billah Hospital, a hospital opened in Tutong in 1997.

=== Honours ===
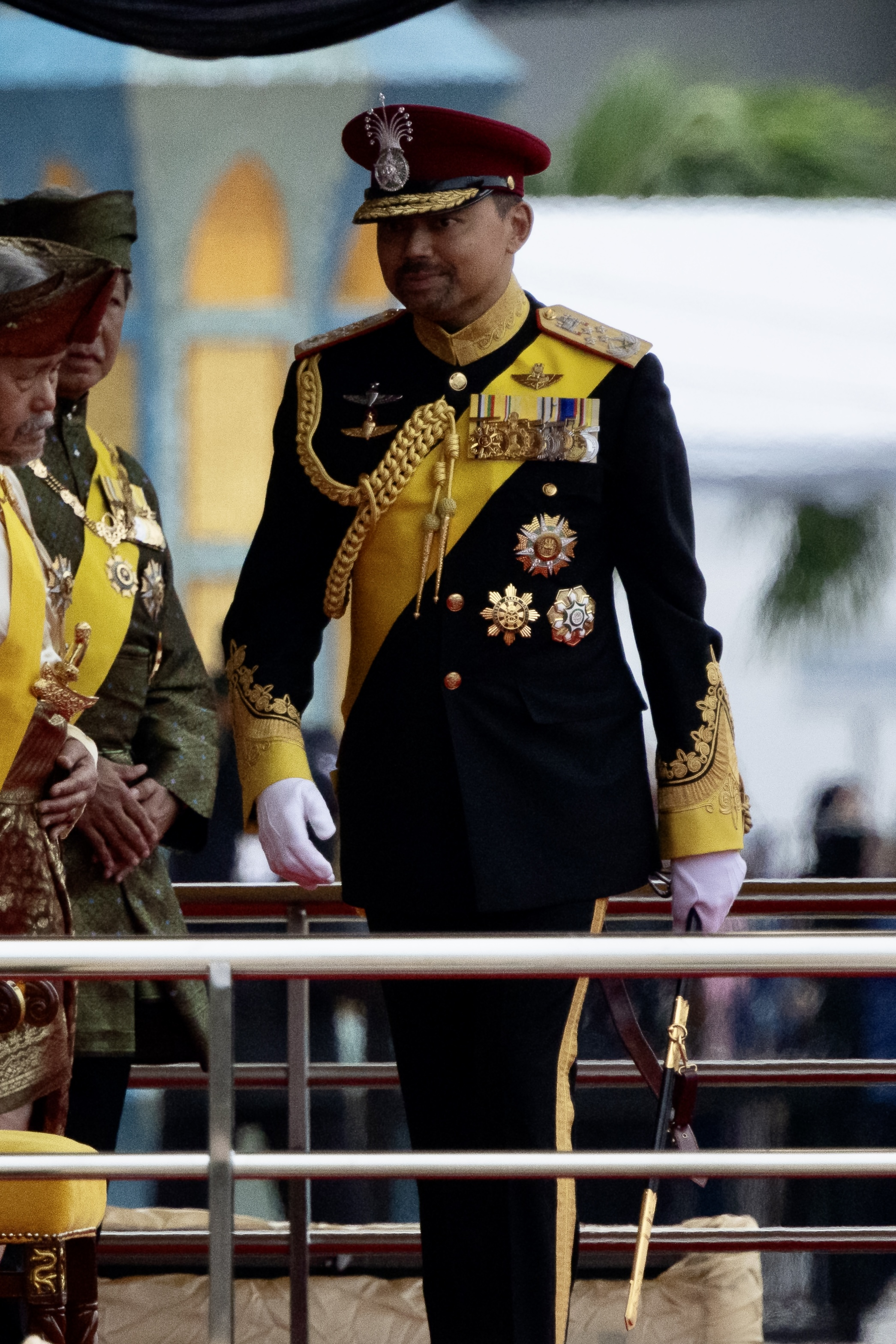
Al-Muhtadee Billah wearing his ceremonial dress in 2024

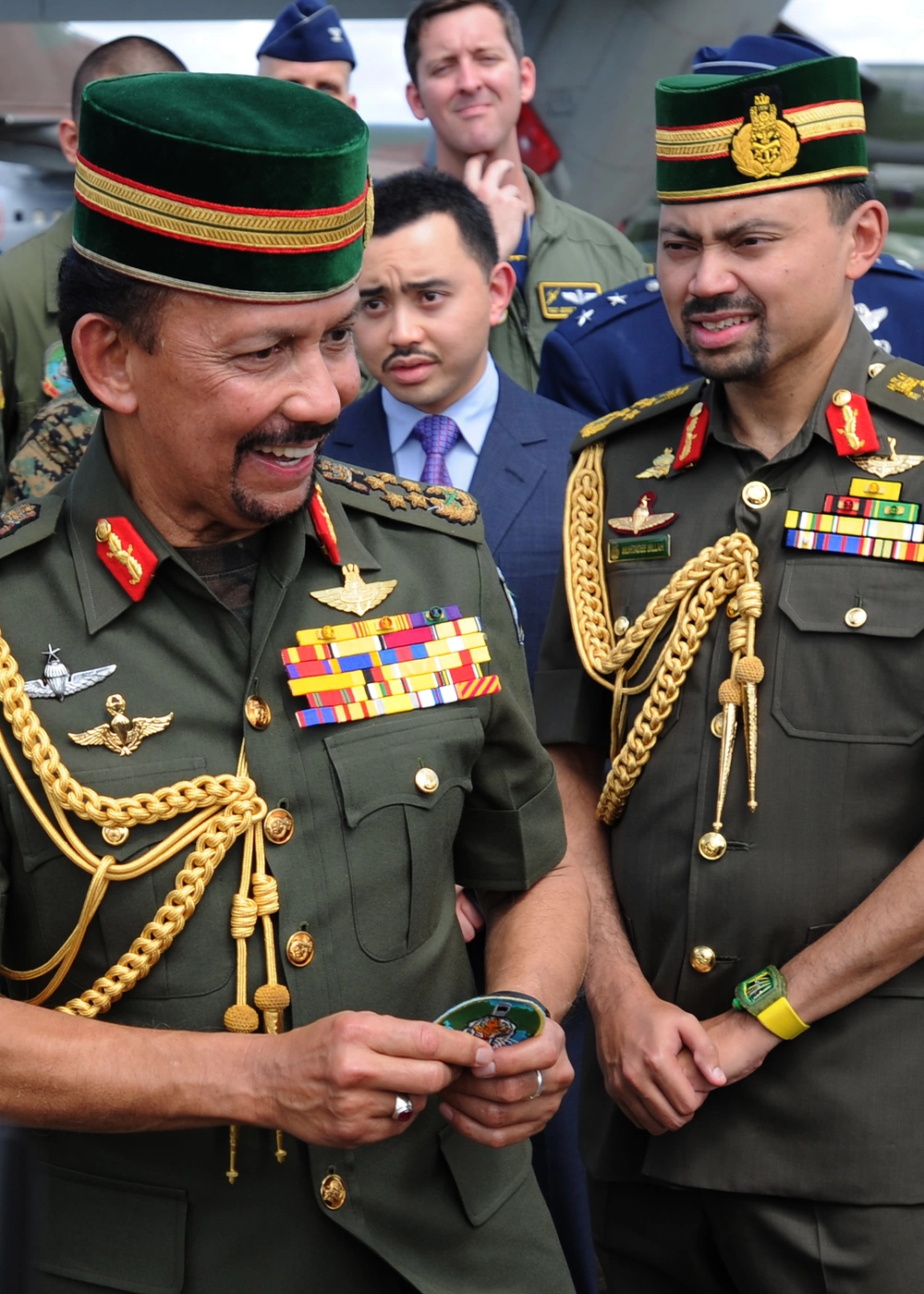
Hassanal Bolkiah alongside Al-Muhtadee Billah and Abdul Malik during BRIDEX 2013

On 4 September 2006, during the 18th convocation ceremony of UBD, Al-Muhtadee Billah received an honorary doctorate in literature from his father, Sultan Hassanal Bolkiah. At the 11th UTB convocation ceremony on 14 September 2023, his father awarded Al-Muhtadee Billah an honorary doctorate in technology innovation in appreciation of his contributions to UTB's growth as the academic leader in engineering, business, science, and technology since the university's upgrade and accreditation. On 17 September 2008, the acting assistant rector of UNISSA granted him an honorary doctorate in Islamic finance in recognition of his leadership and contributions, as well as his noteworthy accomplishments in promoting the expansion, advancement, and empowerment of the Islamic finance ecosystem on a national and worldwide scale.

His academic accretions and honours not only validate the standing and ability of his, but also provide him more legitimacy and momentum in his function as an aide to his father's leadership and administration. Additionally, national honours bestowed upon him are:

- Order of the Crown of Brunei (DKMB; 15 August 1982)
- Order of Paduka Keberanian Laila Terbilang First Class (DPKT) – Dato Paduka Seri (31 May 2004)
- Sultan Hassanal Bolkiah Medal First Class (PHBS; 1 August 1968)
- Proclamation of Independence Medal (1 January 1984)
- Sultan of Brunei Silver Jubilee Medal (5 October 1992)
- Sultan of Brunei Golden Jubilee Medal (5 October 2017)
- National Day Silver Jubilee Medal (23 February 2009)
- Royal Brunei Armed Forces Golden Jubilee Medal (31 May 2011)
- Royal Brunei Armed Forces Diamond Jubilee Medal (31 May 2021)
- General Service Medal (Armed Forces)
- General Service Medal (Police)
- Police 75 Years Medal (1996)
- Police 100 Years Medal (2021)
- Honorary Member of the Special Forces Regiment, RBAF (4 November 2013)

In addition to national honours, he has received several foreign honours, which are:

- Jordan:
  - Grand Cordon of the Supreme Order of the Renaissance (13 May 2008)
- Laos:
  - Lian Kiatikhounh Medal of Honour (22 March 2006)
- Malaysia:
  - Honorary Member of the 21st Special Service Group (13 November 2013)
- Johor:
  - First Class of the Most Esteemed Royal Family Order of Johor (DK I; 12 September 2023)
- Indonesia:
  - Honorary Member of the Kopassus (3 May 2014)
  - Honorary Member of the Indonesian Marine Corps (6 May 2014)
- Netherlands:
  - Grand Cross of the Order of the Crown (21 January 2013)
  - Recipient of the King Willem-Alexander Inauguration Medal (30 April 2013)
- Philippines:
  - Grand Cross of the Order of Lakandula (9 November 2006)
- Saudi Arabia:
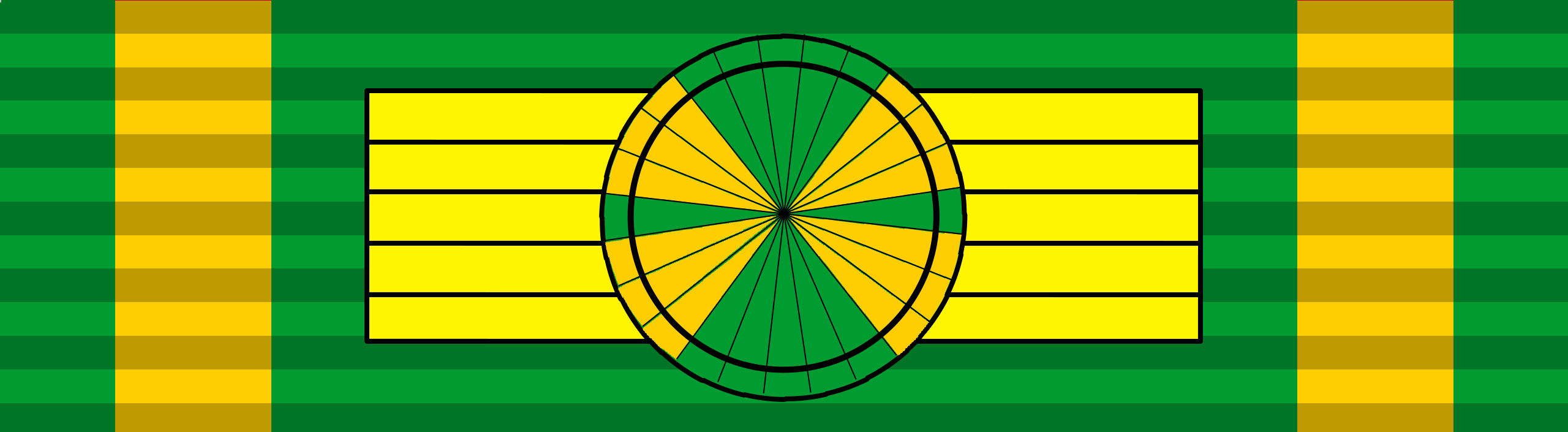
  - First Class of the Order of King Abdulaziz (3 January 1999)
- Singapore:
  - Distinguished Service Order (DUBC; 8 May 2006)
  - Distinguished Service Order (Military) (DUBC; 20 January 2009)
  - Honorary Advanced Combat Skills Badge (2 September 2014)
  - Honorary Light Strike Vehicle MK-II Driver's License (2 September 2014)
- United Kingdom:
  - Honorary Knight Grand Cross of the Royal Victorian Order (GCVO; 17 September 1998)

== See also ==
- List of current heirs apparent

Al-Muhtadee Billah House of Bolkiah Born: 17 February 1974
Bruneian royalty
Vacant Title last held by Hassanal Bolkiah	Crown Prince of Brunei; 10 August 1998 – present	Incumbent
Political offices
New title Post Created	Senior Minister of the Prime Minister's Office; 24 May 2005 – present	Incumbent
Military offices
New title Post Created	General of the Royal Brunei Armed Forces; 25 March 2004	Incumbent
Academic offices
New title Post Created	Pro-Chancellor of the University of Brunei Darussalam; 1984 – present	Incumbent
Business positions
Preceded by Hassanal Bolkiah	Chairman of Brunei Darussalam Central Bank; 2011 – 2021	Succeeded by Ahmaddin Abdul Rahman
