= Ahmaddin Abdul Rahman =

Bruneian politician (born 1972)

Yang Berhormat Dato Seri Setia Ahmaddin Abdul Rahman PSNB SPMB DPMB PIKB
- احمدين عبد الرحمن
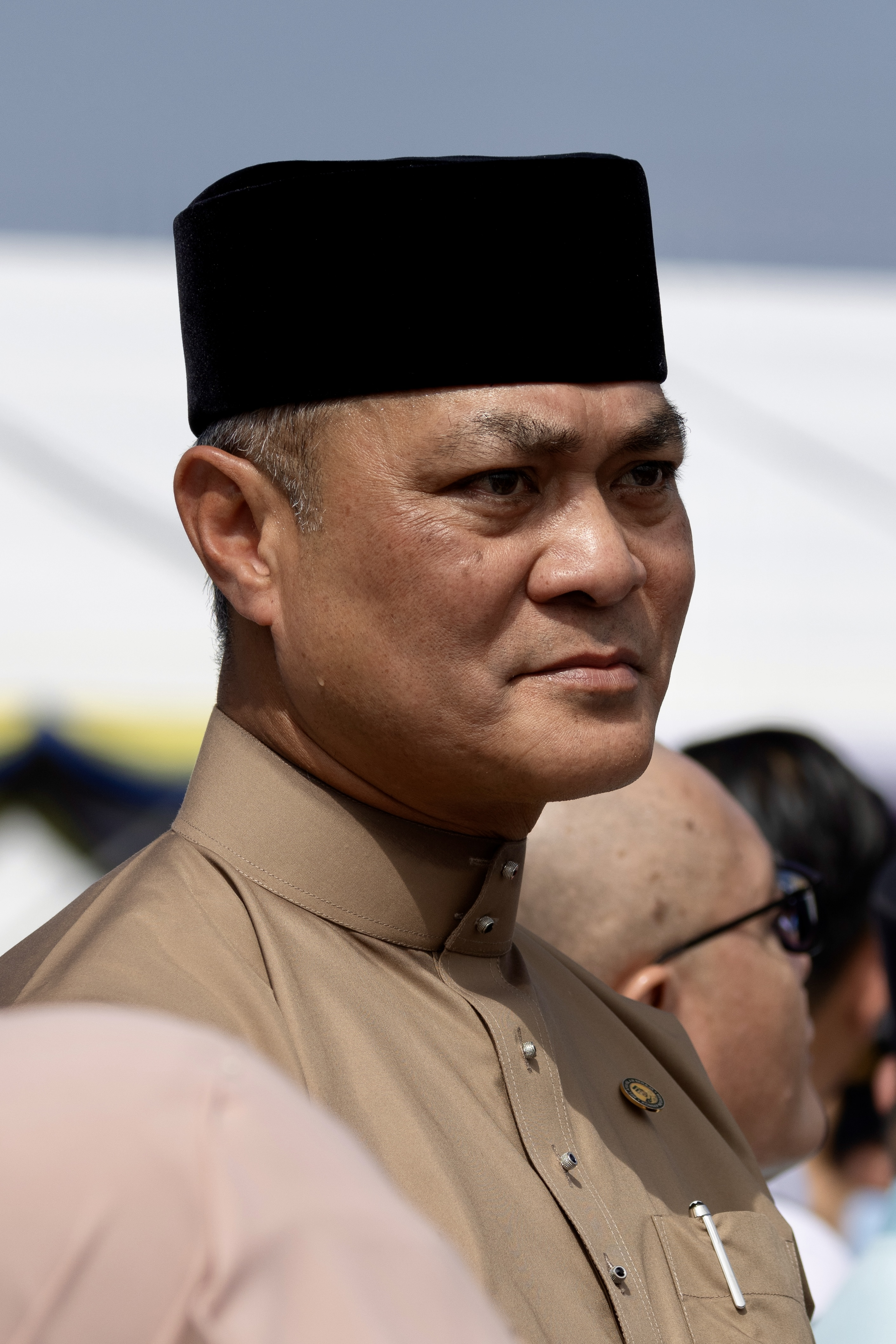
- Ahmaddin in 2024

6th Minister of Home Affairs
- Incumbent
- Assumed office 7 June 2022
- Monarch: Hassanal Bolkiah
- Preceded by: Abu Bakar Apong

Deputy Minister of Finance and Economy
- In office 30 January 2018 – 7 June 2022 Serving with Abdul Manaf Metussin
- Minister: Hassanal Bolkiah; Amin Liew Abdullah
- Preceded by: Hisham Hanifah; Amin Liew Abdullah
- Succeeded by: Khairuddin Abdul Hamid; Pengiran Zety Sufina

Chairman of Brunei Darussalam Central Bank
- In office 27 June 2021 – 7 June 2022
- Preceded by: Al-Muhtadee Billah
- Succeeded by: Khairuddin Abdul Hamid

Personal details
- Born: April 1972 (age 54); Brunei
- Education: Universiti Brunei Darussalam (BA)
- Profession: Politician; civil servant

Ahmaddin bin Haji Abdul Rahman (born April 1972) is the incumbent Minister of Home Affairs (MOHA) in Brunei since 2022, the former Deputy Minister of Finance and Economy (MoFE), and the chairman of both Royal Brunei Technical Services (RBTS) and Brunei Darussalam Central Bank (BDCB). In addition to serving on a number of government committees dealing with ease of doing business, corporatisation and public–private partnerships, manpower planning and employment, FDIs and downstream industries, and sukuk management, Ahmaddin currently sits on the boards of government-linked companies in a variety of sectors, including banking, medical, oil and gas, logistics, and real estate.

== Early life and education ==
Ahmaddin was born in April 1972 and at the Universiti Brunei Darussalam (UBD), Ahmaddin earned a Bachelor of Arts (Hons) in Management Studies in 1996.

== Early career ==
In 1996, Ahmaddin began working with the government (Immigration and National Registration Department). He also served as the acting director of research and planning for the public service department, controller of customs for the royal customs and excise department, and director of administration and finance within the ministry. Ahmaddin began holding a number of important roles in the MoFE, including Permanent Secretary of Policy and Investment, Policy, and Performance, all of which he held from 24 August 2017 to 22 October 2015. During a cabinet reshuffle on 30 January 2018, he was appointed the deputy minister of finance and the economy. Moreover, he was the director of Royal Brunei Airlines (RBA) from 8 June 2018 until his resignation on 4 January 2021.

== Ministerial career ==
On 27 June 2021, Ahmaddin was appointed the chairman of BDCB, replacing Crown prince Al-Muhtadee Billah. He would later be reappointed the Minister of Home Affairs, following a cabinet reshuffle on 7 June 2022. The youth should cultivate the proper mindset, attitude, and abilities, according to Ahmaddin during the 5th Youth Town Hall Brunei on 5 December 2022, to effectively contribute to national development. Additionally, he mentioned that to realize the development of the entire country, kids must be able to meet the requirements for good leadership and teamwork. On 9 March 2023, the MOHA will support the budget theme of "Creating A Successful Future Together" by concentrating on three goals, according to Ahmaddin in his introduction to the allocation for the Ministry and its departments totaling over B$136 million. The Minister of Home Affairs claims that one of the goals is security and well-being.

== Personal life ==
Ahmaddin is married to Datin Hajah Norzana binti Pengiran Haji Rosli.

== Honours ==
Ahmaddin has been awarded the following honours:

- Order of Setia Negara Brunei First Class (PSNB; 15 July 2022) – Dato Seri Setia
- Order of Setia Negara Brunei Fourth Class (PSB)
- Order of Seri Paduka Mahkota Brunei First Class (SPMB) – Dato Seri Paduka
- Order of Seri Paduka Mahkota Brunei Second Class (DPMB; 15 July 2017) – Dato Paduka
- Excellent Service Medal (PIKB)
- Sultan of Brunei Golden Jubilee Medal (5 October 2017)

Political offices
| Preceded by Abu Bakar Apong | 6th Minister of Energy; 7 June 2022 – present | Incumbent |
| Preceded by Hisham Hanifah; Amin Liew Abdullah | Deputy Minister of Finance and Economy; 30 January 2018 – 7 June 2022 | Succeeded by Khairuddin Abdul Hamid; Pengiran Zety Sufina |
Business positions
| Preceded by Al-Muhtadee Billah | Chairman of Brunei Darussalam Central Bank; 27 June 2021 – 17 July 2022 | Succeeded by Khairuddin Abdul Hamid |
