= Amin Liew Abdullah =

Bruneian businessman and civil servant (born 1962)

Dato Seri Setia Dr. Awang Haji Mohd Amin Liew bin Abdullah
- ليو ڤراووس / 刘光明
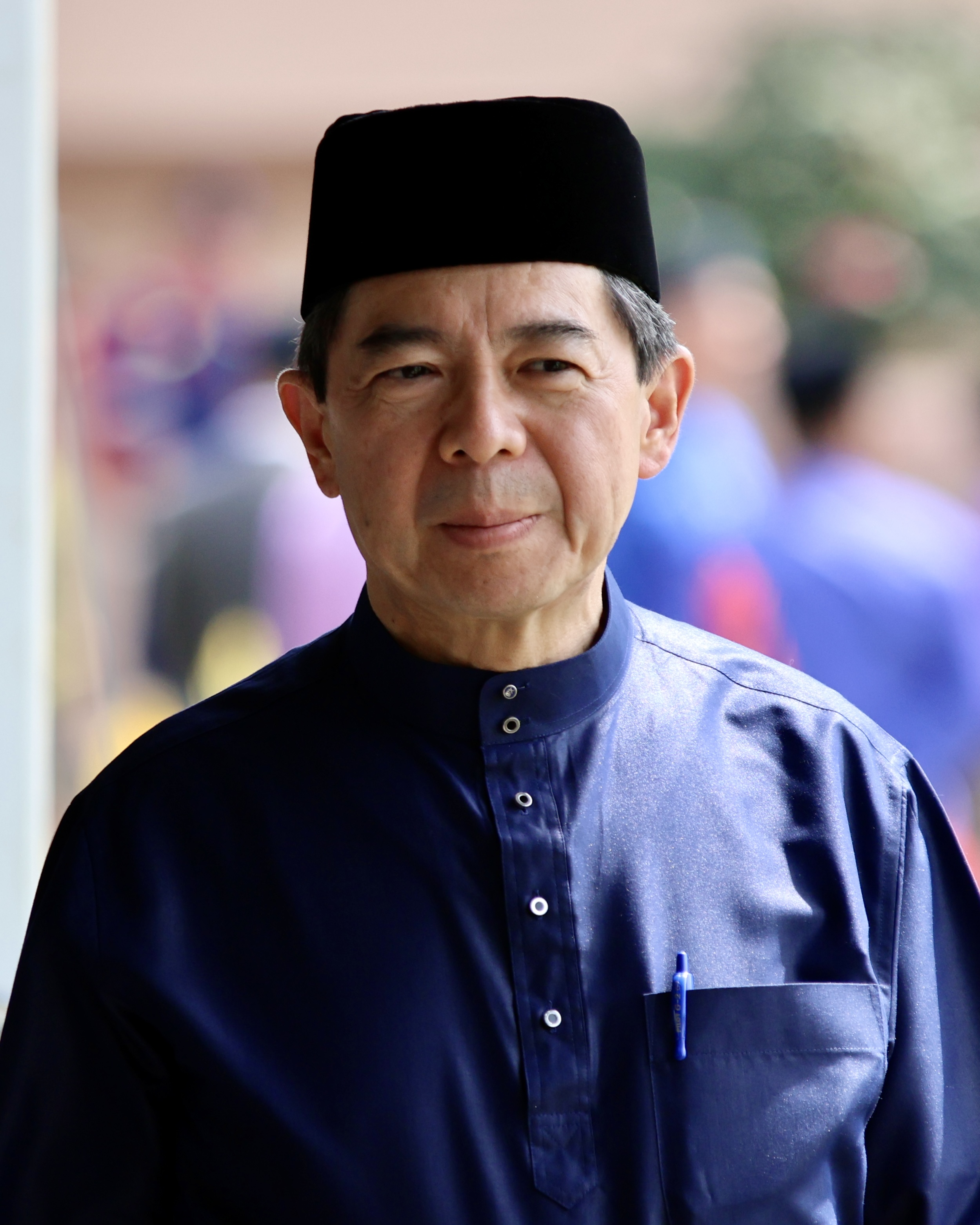

2nd Minister of Finance II
- Incumbent
- Assumed office 30 January 2018
- Monarch: Hassanal Bolkiah
- Preceded by: Abdul Rahman bin Ibrahim

Minister at Prime Minister Office
- In office 27 September 2018 – 4 June 2026
- Monarch: Hassanal Bolkiah
- Preceded by: Abdul Rahman bin Ibrahim; Lim Jock Seng
- Succeeded by: Portfolio restructured / Concluded in 2026 cabinet reshuffle

Deputy Minister of Finance
- In office 22 October 2015 – 30 January 2018
- Minister: Hassanal Bolkiah; Abdul Rahman Ibrahim
- Preceded by: Bahrin Abdullah
- Succeeded by: Ahmaddin Abdul Rahman

Chairman of the Brunei Economic Development Board (BEDB)
- In office 8 October 2018 – Incumbent
- Preceded by: Ali Apong

Chairman of Bank Islam Brunei Darussalam
- In office 30 January 2018 – Incumbent
- Preceded by: Bahrin Abdullah

Chairman of Royal Brunei Airlines
- In office 8 June 2018 – 4 January 2021
- Preceded by: Bahrin Abdullah
- Succeeded by: Abdul Manaf Metussin

Personal details
- Born: December 1962 (age 63) Brunei
- Party: Independent
- Spouse: Pengiran Datin Hajah Noor Yashimah binti Pengiran Anak Haji Hashim
- Children: 2 known children (including Mohd Isa Liew and Muhd Danial)
- Education: Queen Mary University of London (BSc); Imperial College London (MSc, PhD)
- Profession: Civil servant, Economist, Business executive
- Awards: PNSB; SPMB

Mohd Amin Liew bin Abdullah, also known as Liew Kong Ming (Chinese: 刘光明; pinyin: Liú Guāngmíng; born December 1962) is a Bruneian businessman and civil servant. He currently serving as the second minister of finance II and minister at the Prime Minister's Office (PMO) since 2018 until 2026 He also holds key positions as chairman of the Brunei Economic Development Board (BEDB) and Bank Islam Brunei Darussalam (BIBD). Prior to his current roles, he served as deputy minister of finance from 2015 to 2018.

== Early life and education ==
Mohd Amin Liew bin Abdullah, who is of Chinese descent originally named Liew Kong Ming before his conversion to Islam, was born in December 1962. He pursued his higher education in the United Kingdom, earning a bachelor's degree from Queen Mary University of London in 1984, followed by a master's degree and a PhD from Imperial College, University of London, in 1989 and 1993, respectively.

== Career ==
=== Early career ===
After working as a research analyst for ICI Finance PLC in the United Kingdom during the late 1980s and early 1990s, Amin Liew returned to Brunei and became a crude oil trader at Brunei Shell Petroleum in the mid-1990s. A Chartered Financial Analyst (CFA) since 2004 and a member of CFA Singapore, he joined the Brunei Investment Agency (BIA), also known as the Brunei Sovereign Fund, on 16 October 1997. His rise to prominence is particularly notable given that he was initially hired by Prince Jefri Bolkiah, whose Amedeo Development Corporation firm collapsed in 1998 with nearly US$16 billion in debt and who had severely mismanaged the BIA.

Amin Liew steadily rose through the ranks and was appointed managing director in May 2005. During his tenure, he worked on portfolio strategies and operations across various investment portfolios, including listed equities, fixed income, real estate, private equity, and joint ventures. During his tenure at BIA, he also served as permanent secretary at the ministry of finance from October 2008 until 20 June 2010, the same date he completed his role as managing director at BIA.

From 21 June 2010 to 15 September 2011, Amin Liew served as permanent secretary at the ministry of industry and primary resources. On 30 January 2012, he was appointed as Progen Holdings' director of finance and business development as a non-independent, non-executive director, with the board recognising his extensive experience in finance, business research, and development. In this role, he oversaw cash flow management, accounting, tax compliance, internal controls, corporate governance, and other regulatory matters. Later that year, on 9 April, Yoma Strategic Holdings announced his appointment as an independent director, following a recommendation by its nominating committee. However, on 9 February 2015, Progen Holdings announced his removal from its board of directors due to his increasing responsibilities as CEO of Darussalam Assets and his full-time relocation to Brunei in November 2014, which prevented him from dedicating sufficient time to the role.

=== Deputy Minister of Finance ===
Following the Bruneian cabinet reshuffle on 22 October 2015, Amin Liew was appointed as deputy minister of finance. In July 2016, he established the Chinese Firms Association in Brunei, which comprised 27 companies from the People's Republic of China. On 9 May 2017, he signed a memorandum of understanding (MoU) with Guangxi Ruian Logistics for a B$60 million Halal food and spice operation centre in Brunei.

=== Minister of Finance II ===
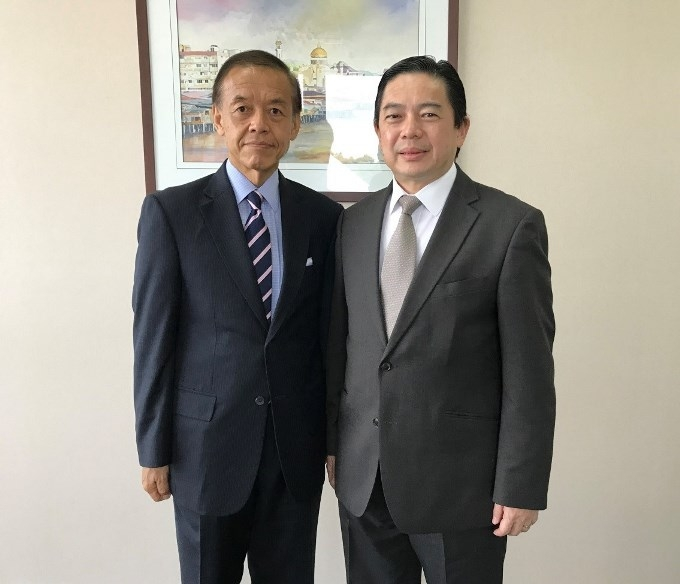
Amin Liew (right) in 2017

Following a cabinet reshuffle on 30 January 2018, Amin Liew was appointed as the second minister of finance and simultaneously became the chairman of BIBD. Later that year, on 8 October, he was also appointed as the chairman of the BEDB.

On 21 February 2019, Amin Liew presided over the opening of State Street Corporation's new headquarters at Pavo Point, highlighting the company's international university ties and encouraging similar collaborations in Brunei to support the nation's financial sector. On 14 March, he announced that financial difficulties faced by CFLD (Singapore) Investment had led to the postponement of Brunei's special economic zone project. Later, on 9 December, he represented the Ministry of Finance and Economy's Strategic Development Capital Fund in signing a MoU with 8F Asset Management to invest in a land-based Atlantic salmon farming facility using a recirculating aquaculture system.

On 1 October 2020, Amin Liew launched the ARMECS Bridging Programme under the Manpower Industry Steering Committee Construction to enhance local employability in the construction sector. In May 2021, he represented Brunei as governor at the 54th Annual Meeting of the Asian Development Bank Board of Governors. Later that year, on 16 December, he facilitated Brunei's official membership with the International Finance Corporation, highlighting opportunities for collaboration to support economic diversification, sustainable growth, and private sector empowerment. During a virtual meeting with South Korea's Yeo Han-koo on 7 April 2022, he expressed support for South Korea's application to join the Comprehensive and Progressive Agreement for Trans-Pacific Partnership.

=== Minister at the Prime Minister's Office ===
Amin Liew was appointed as minister at the PMO and retained his position during a cabinet reshuffle on 7 June 2022. On 7 July, he launched the Brunei Economy Programme and delivered a keynote address on supporting MSMEs for a sustainable digital future, stressing the importance of public-private cooperation in achieving Brunei's economic goals under Wawasan Brunei 2035. In a move to enhance sustainability, trade, and crisis preparedness, he and Singapore's Gan Kim Yong signed two MoUs on 24 August to strengthen collaboration in energy, the green economy, and the resilience of food and medical supplies. On 27 August 2022, he signed various MoUs on behalf of Brunei's government to enhance cooperation between Singapore's Public Services Division and Brunei's PMO, with Chan Chun Sing representing Singapore.

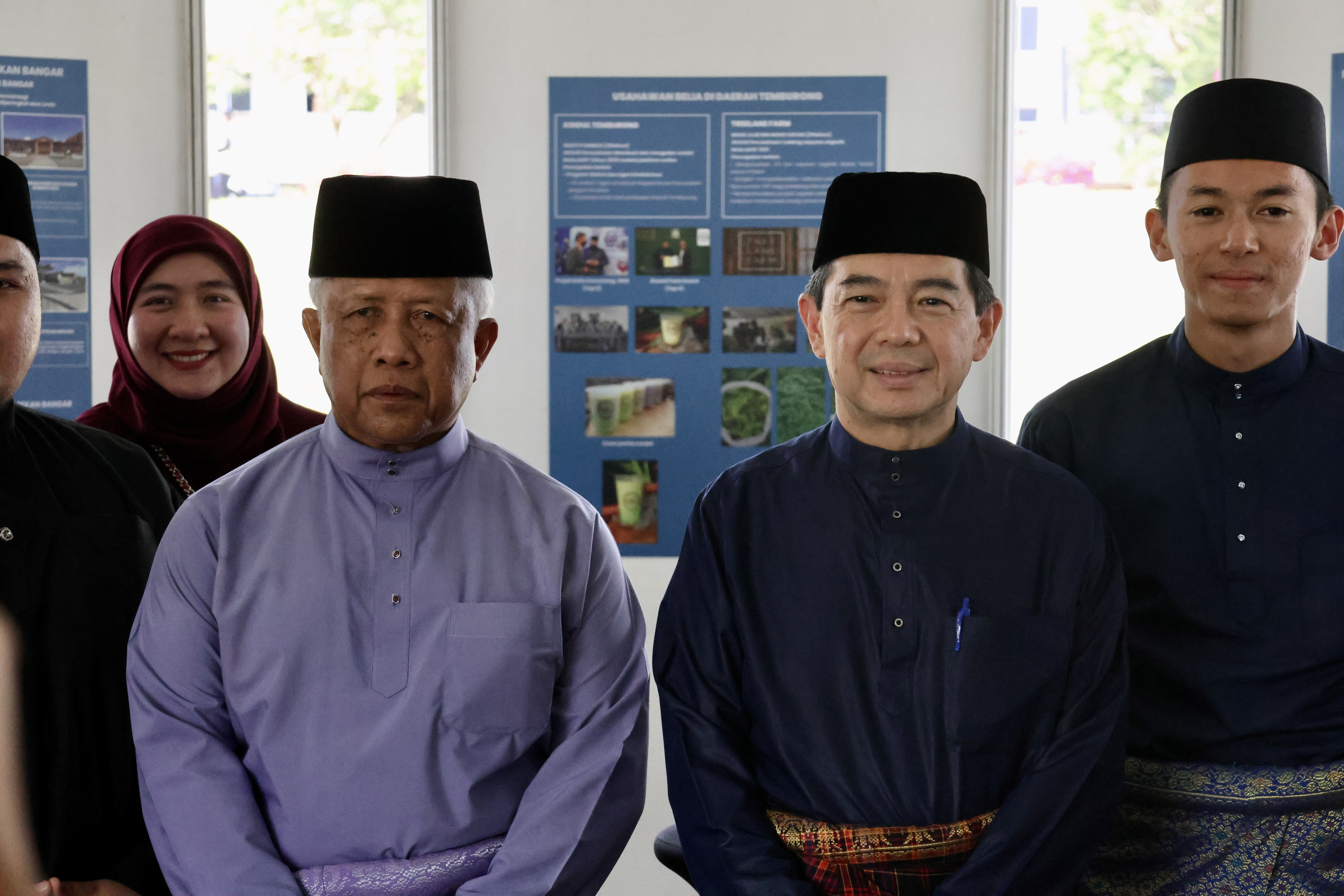
Halbi Mohammad Yussof and Amin Liew attending a celebration in Bangar, Temburong, on 27 July 2023

Amin Liew spoke at the APEC Finance Ministers' Meeting in Bangkok on 23 October 2022, outlining Brunei's efforts to tackle rising inflation and diversify its economy. On 1 November, he officiated the opening of the Ministry of Health (MoH) Intelligence Hub at the EVYD Campus in Jerudong, a collaboration between the MoH and EVYD Technology. He and Ken Saitō of Japan signed a memorandum of cooperation on energy transition on 15 December 2023, with the goal of strengthening their bilateral relationship and promoting energy cooperation through the Asia Energy Transition Initiative and the Asia Zero Emission Community platform.

On 13 February 2024, Amin Liew and UAE's Mohammad Al Gergawi signed a MoU to enhance government development and modernisation through the Government Experience Exchange Program, strengthening bilateral collaboration. At the 20th session of the Legislative Council of Brunei on 16 March 2024, he addressed the rise in utility costs, attributing it to issues such as unauthorised meter modifications, malfunctioning meters, failure to top up smart water meters, and water leaks.

During an interview in July 2024, Amin Liew emphasised his focus on fiscal consolidation, economic diversification, and public-private partnerships, highlighting the need to improve efficiency, reduce dependence on oil and gas, and promote sustainable growth in sectors such as aquaculture, agriculture, ICT, and ecotourism. He also underscored the importance of investing in human capital and local businesses to secure Brunei's long-term prosperity. On 28 August, he signed a MoU with Muhammed Al-Jasser of the Islamic Development Bank to establish a strategic partnership and Country Engagement Framework for 2025–2030, targeting key areas such as climate change, SME support, Islamic finance, and economic growth in alignment with Wawasan Brunei 2035.

Amin Liew declared on 8 March 2025, that Brunei's feasibility study for a stock exchange is finished, and that the country will start implementing it this month. The plan calls for a central securities depository, clearing house, and securities exchange to promote financial development.

== Personal life ==
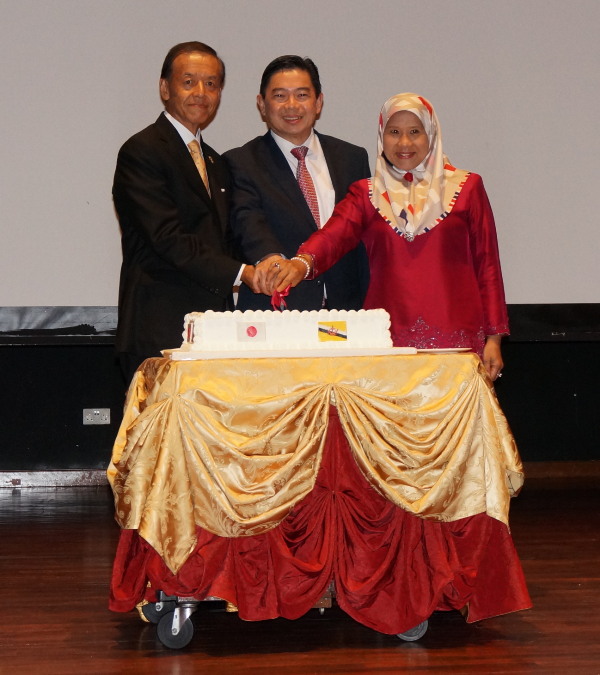
Amin Liew (centre) and his wife (right) attending the Emperor's Birthday in 2018

Amin Liew is married to Pengiran Datin Hajah Noor Yashimah binti Pengiran Anak Haji Hashim, a member of the Brunei royal family. Together, they have two known children, Mohd Isa Liew and Muhd Danial.

== Honours ==
Amin Liew has earned the following honours:

- Order of Setia Negara Brunei First Class (PSNB; 15 July 2018) – Dato Seri Setia
- Order of Setia Negara Brunei Third Class (SNB; 15 July 2006)
- Order of Seri Paduka Mahkota Brunei First Class (SPMB; 15 July 2017) – Dato Seri Paduka
- Order of Seri Paduka Mahkota Brunei Second Class (DPMB; 15 July 2010) – Dato Paduka

Political offices
Preceded by Abdul Rahman Ibrahim	2nd Minister of Finance and Economy II; 30 January 2018–present	Incumbent
Preceded by Bahrin Abdullah	Deputy Minister of Finance; 22 October 2015 – 30 January 2018	Succeeded by Ahmaddin Abdul Rahman
Business positions
Preceded by Ali Apong	Chairman of Brunei Economic Development Board; 8 October 2018 – present	Incumbent
Preceded by Bahrin Abdullah	Chairman of Bank Islam Brunei Darussalam; 30 January 2018 – present	Incumbent
Preceded by Bahrin Abdullah	Chairman of Royal Brunei Airlines; 8 June 2018 – 4 January 2021	Succeeded by Abdul Manaf Metussin
