= Ministry of Finance (Brunei) =

Government ministry of Brunei

- Kementerian Kewangan
- National emblem of Brunei

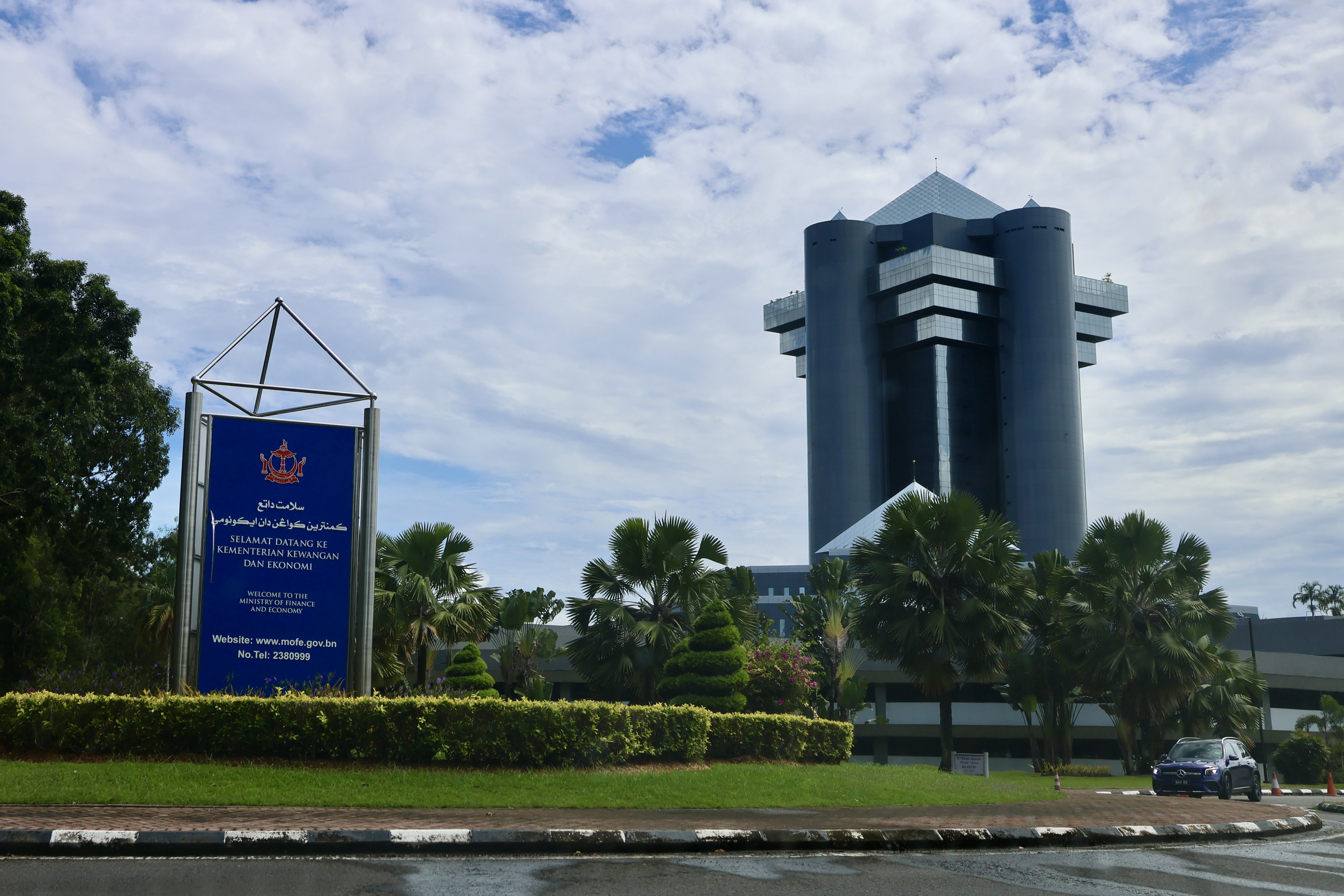
- Ministry of Finance and Economy building

Ministry overview
- Formed: 1 January 1984; 42 years ago
- Jurisdiction: Government of Brunei
- Headquarters: Bandar Seri Begawan, Brunei; 4°55′19″N 114°57′07″E
- Employees: 1,917 (2024)
- Annual budget: ▲$1 billion BND (2022)
- Ministers responsible: Sultan Hassanal Bolkiah, Minister of Finance and Economy; Mohd. Amin Liew Abdullah (Note: The official Malay name upon the appointment was Dato Seri Setia Dr. Awang Haji Mohd. Amin Liew bin Abdullah.), Second Minister of Finance
- Deputy Ministers responsible: Khairuddin Abdul Hamid (Note: The official Malay name upon the appointment was Awang Haji Khairuddin bin Haji Abdul Hamid.), Deputy Minister of Finance and Economy; Pengiran Zety Sufina Pengiran Sani (Note: The official Malay name upon the appointment was Pengiran Hajah Zety Sufina binti Pengiran Dato Paduka Haji Sani.), Deputy Minister of Finance and Economy
- Website: www.mofe.gov.bn

The Ministry of Finance(MOF; Malay: Kementerian Kewangan) is a cabinet-level ministry in the government of Brunei which is responsible for the monetary, fiscal and economic policies and development in the country. It was established immediately upon Brunei's independence on 1 January 1984. It is currently led by a minister in which the incumbent is Hassanal Bolkiah, the Sultan of Brunei, as well as a second minister and two deputy ministers.

== Departments ==
The ministry oversees the following departments:

- Treasury Department (Pejabat Treasury) — obeys the law known as "The 1983 Financial Regulation". The rule also makes reference to later official circulars from MoFE and the Prime Minister's Office;
- Royal Customs and Excise Department (Jabatan Kastam dan Eksais Diraja; RCED) — leading organisation for the Ease of Doing Business (EODB) indicator Trading Across Borders (TAB);
- Department of Economic Planning and Statistics (Jabatan Perancangan Ekonomi dan Statistik; DEPS) — in line with Wawasan Brunei 2035, DEPD aims to foster Brunei's sustainable economic growth through visionary planning, innovative implementation involving all societal sectors, and the provision of high-quality, internationally-aligned statistics.

== Budget ==
In the fiscal year 2022–23, the ministry has been allocated a budget of B$1 billion (Note: ≈US$718 million as of July 2022), an eight percent increase from the previous year.

== List of ministers ==
=== First minister ===
No.	Portrait	Minister	Term start	Term end	Time in office	Ref.
1		Hassanal Bolkiah	1 January 1984	20 October 1986	2 years, 293 days	
2		Jefri Bolkiah	20 October 1986	23 February 1997	10 years, 126 days	
(1)		Hassanal Bolkiah	23 February 1997	incumbent	29 years, 221 days	

=== Second minister ===
No.	Portrait	Minister	Term start	Term end	Time in office	Ref.
1		Abdul Rahman Ibrahim	24 May 2005	30 January 2018	12 years, 251 days	
2		Amin Liew Abdullah	30 January 2018	incumbent	8 years, 245 days	

=== Deputy minister ===
Portrait	Minister	Term start	Term end	Time in office	Ref.
	Ahmad Wally Skinner	21 October 1986	March 2003	16 years	
	Selamat Munap	-	-	-	
	Yakub Abu Bakar	March 2003	20 September 2004	1 year	
	Abdul Rahman Ibrahim	20 September 2004	24 May 2005	246 days	
	Bahrin Abdullah	29 May 2010	22 October 2015	5 years, 146 days	
	Hisham Mohd Hanifah	22 October 2015	30 January 2018	2 years, 100 days	
	Amin Liew Abdullah	22 October 2015	30 January 2018	2 years, 100 days	
	Ahmaddin Abdul Rahman	30 January 2018	7 June 2022	4 years, 128 days	
	Abdul Manaf Metussin	20 September 2018	7 June 2022	3 years, 260 days	
	Khairuddin Abdul Hamid	7 June 2022	4 June 2026	3 years, 362 days	
	Pengiran Zety Sufina	7 June 2022	4 June 2026	3 years, 362 days	

== See also ==
- Brunei Darussalam Central Bank
