= Brunei Economic Development Board =

Government agency in Brunei

- Lembaga Kemajuan Ekonomi Brunei لمباڬ كماجوان ايكونومي بروني
- National emblem of Brunei

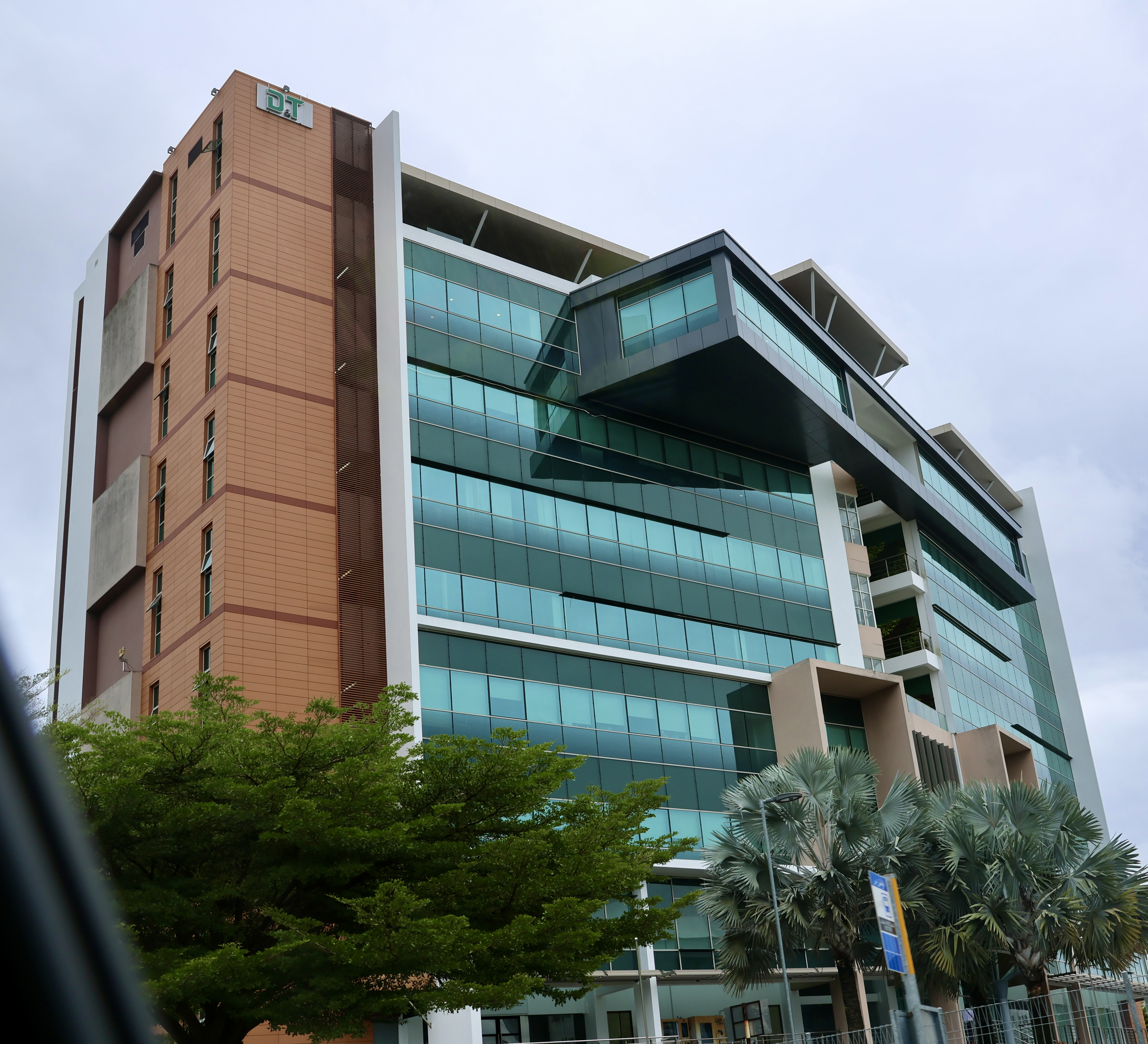
- Headquarters in Bandar Seri Begawan

Agency overview
- Formed: 11 April 1975; 51 years ago
- Jurisdiction: Government of Brunei
- Headquarters: Design & Technology Building, Simpang 32-37, Kampong Anggerek Desa, Bandar Seri Begawan BB3713, Brunei
- Agency executives: Daniel Leong, acting CEO; Amin Liew Abdullah, chairman
- Parent ministry: Ministry of Finance and Economy
- Website: www.bedb.gov.bn

The Brunei Economic Development Board (BEDB) (Note: Malay: Lembaga Kemajuan Ekonomi Brunei (LKEB); Jawi: لمباڬ كماجوان ايكونومي بروني) is a statutory body of the Government of Brunei. It was established in 1975 under the Brunei Economic Development Board Act (Chapter 104) to promote economic growth and diversification. Initially, BEDB focused on supporting small and medium-sized enterprises (SMEs) and encouraging local participation in the economy, while some responsibilities, such as tourism, insurance, and SME financing, were later transferred to other government entities.

Over the years, BEDB has played a central role in Brunei's industrial and economic development, driving major projects such as aluminium smelting, deep-sea port construction, and the Hengyi Oil Refinery and Petrochemical Plant at Pulau Muara Besar. It has also supported cultural and technological initiatives, including the film Yasmine and e-business programs, while overseeing industrial parks like the Sungai Liang Industrial Park and promoting alternative energy and SME development.

Restructured in 2001 and 2003 and integrated into the Ministry of Finance and Economy in 2018, BEDB has focused on industrialisation, foreign investment, and economic diversification through initiatives such as high-technology funds. Aligned with Wawasan Brunei 2035, it facilitates domestic and foreign investment through streamlined processes, trade incentives, and strategic partnerships, while collaborating with Darussalam Enterprise to foster synergies between foreign direct investment (FDI) and local businesses. Through these efforts, BEDB continues to enhance Brunei's competitiveness as an investment destination.

== Functions ==
Operating under the jurisdiction of the Ministry of Finance and Economy (MoFE), the BEDB aims to foster private domestic and international investment in the country. The board oversees the state's insurance sector and monitors the activities of the Tourism Promotion Committee. Its core responsibilities include promoting and facilitating commercial, industrial, residential, and agricultural projects in designated areas, while supporting enterprises across sectors such as mining, housing, industry, and agriculture. Through these activities, BEDB plays a pivotal role in enhancing Brunei's competitiveness as an investment destination.

To attract both domestic and foreign investments, the BEDB develops policies, incentives, and strategies with a particular focus on advanced technology industries and specialised services that hold strong export potential. The agency also supports the growth of local entrepreneurs, small and medium-sized enterprises (SMEs) while promoting industrial activities and export-driven initiatives. Additionally, the BEDB oversees parks, estates, and industrial sites with corporate-like authority to further its mandate of improving Brunei's economic framework.

As part of Wawasan Brunei 2035, the government emphasises foreign direct investment (FDI) as a critical driver of economic growth. Operating in an open economy, the BEDB offers trade incentives to attract potential investors. Its responsibilities include encouraging foreign participation in priority industries, assisting with permits, clearances, public project tenders, and cost assessments, and assigning dedicated account managers to streamline the investment process.

== History ==
BEDB was established on 11 April 1975 during the Third National Development Plan (RKN), modelled in part on the Economic Development Board of Singapore. It was created as a statutory body under the Brunei Economic Development Board Act (Chapter 104) to promote economic growth and development in the country. Under the Investment Incentives Act of 1975, BEDB actively encouraged local participation in Brunei's economy, making equitable involvement a mandatory requirement and launching programmes in 1978 to support local entrepreneurs and SMEs.

Over time, some of BEDB's responsibilities were transferred to other government entities. With the establishment of the Ministry of Industry and Primary Resources (MIPR) and the Financial Institutional Division under the Ministry of Finance and Economy (MoFE), areas such as tourism and insurance were reassigned. Management of the SME financing programme was taken over by the Development Bank of Brunei in 1995. In 1998, BEDB merged with the Economic Planning Unit to form the Department of Economic Planning and Development, reflecting an evolution of its role within Brunei's broader economic governance framework.

BEDB was restructured under the Brunei Economic Development Board (Amendment) Order, 2001, effective 1 June, strengthening its legislative framework to promote both domestic and foreign investments. As part of the government's strategy to diversify the economy and reduce dependence on oil and gas, BEDB supported industrialisation and economic diversification through initiatives such as a high-technology industrial fund under the RKN 8 (2001–2005). The board's role focused on positioning Brunei as an investment destination and fostering industries that add value to hydrocarbons while developing non-oil and gas sectors, with the appointment of John Anthony Perry as CEO seen as a step toward advancing these objectives. The Brunei Economic Development Board Act (Amendment) Order, 2003, enacted on 24 March, revised the board's legislative mandate.

On 20 September 2018, BEDB was incorporated into the MoFE. In May 2019, the FDI Action and Support Centre (FAST) was integrated into BEDB to support Brunei's economic diversification goals. This integration aimed to streamline project facilitation for international investors by expediting processes for acquiring permits related to foreign labour and infrastructure projects, enhancing BEDB's role in promoting foreign investment.

From 2019 onwards, BEDB's mandate was supported through a series of government reforms, including the Brunei Economic Development Act, the Investment Incentive Order, and amendments to the Income Tax Order. These reforms strengthened Brunei's legal and regulatory framework for investment, making the country more attractive to foreign investors while also promoting the growth of micro, small, and medium enterprises. As of 2024, BEDB continues to oversee industrial park development and works in collaboration with Darussalam Enterprise to foster synergies between FDI and local businesses.

== Senior leadership ==
As of 2024, the senior leadership officeholders are as follows:

- Chairman: Haji Mohd Amin Liew bin Abdullah (since 8 October 2018)
- Co-deputy Chairperson: Haji Khairuddin bin Haji Abdul Hamid
- Co-deputy Chairperson: Pengiran Hajah Zety Sufina binti Pengiran Haji Sani

=== List of former CEOs ===
- John Anthony Perry (2001–2006)
- Vincent Cheong (2007–2010)

=== List of former chairpersons ===
- Haji Yusoff bin Haji Abdul Hamid (2001–2004)
- Haji Mohammad bin Haji Daud (2004–2005)
- Timothy Ong Teck Mong (2005–2010) (Note: Acting chairperson)
- Haji Ali bin Haji Apong (2010–2018)

== Business ventures ==
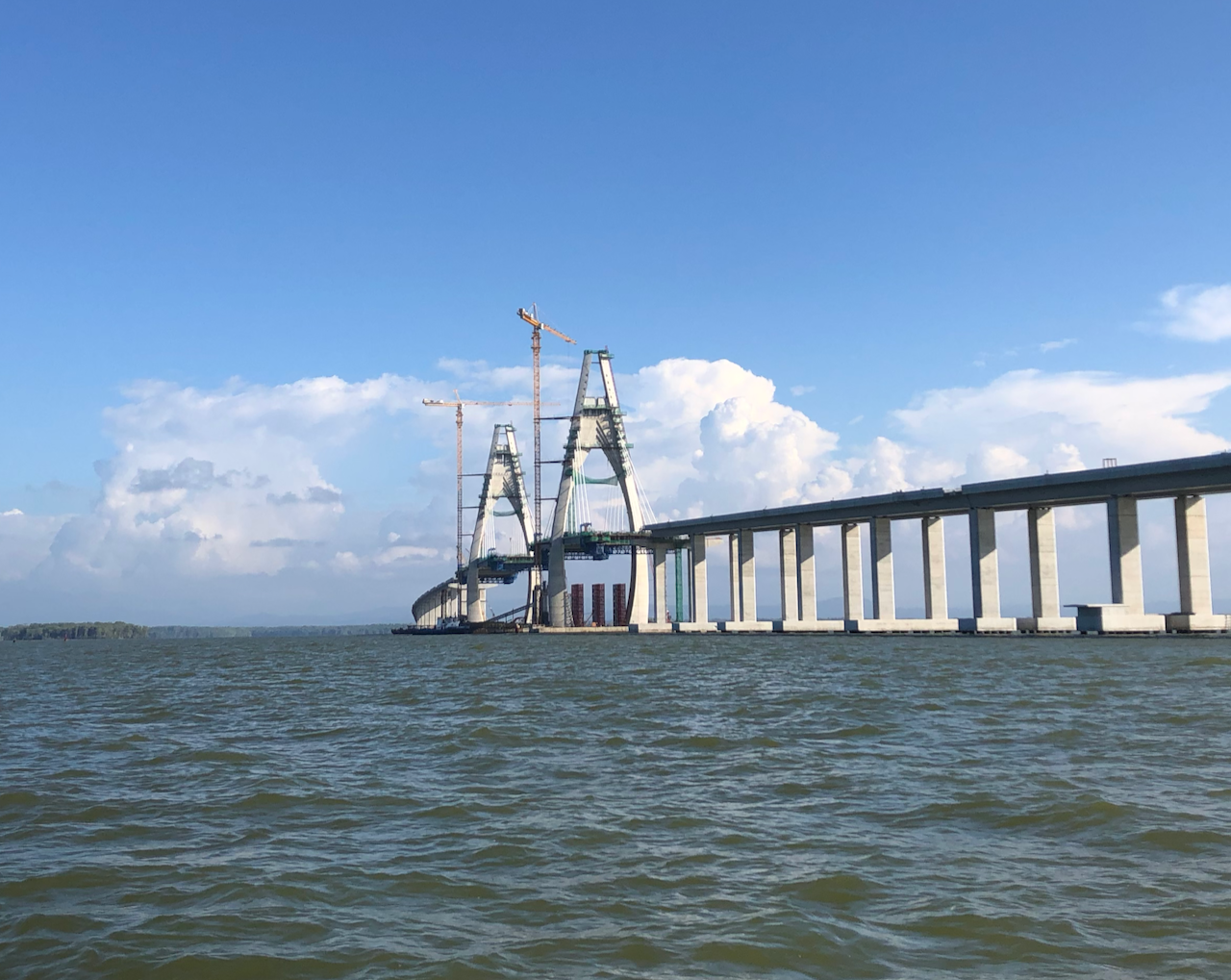
Construction of the Sultan Haji Omar Ali Saifuddien Bridge in 2019

Between the 1970s and 1989, it provided around B$70 million in loans to SMEs nationwide. The BEDB has also streamlined investment procedures and supported business development, working alongside the Brunei Investment Agency to reduce bureaucratic barriers and simplify the regulatory framework for both FDI and domestic enterprises.

In the early 2000s, BEDB implemented a two-pronged strategy to strengthen Brunei's industrial infrastructure. This included an aluminium smelter project in partnership with Alcoa to develop the industrial and petrochemical downstream sectors, as well as the construction of a deep-sea port for transshipment services. During the 2010s, BEDB was associated with major projects such as the Western Foods and Packaging Manufacturing Plant and the Hengyi Oil Refinery and Petrochemical Plant at Pulau Muara Besar (PMB), further contributing to Brunei's industrial expansion.

BEDB has supported cultural and technological initiatives to diversify the economy. It provided a B$120,000 grant to Origin Films for the 2014 movie Yasmine, highlighting Brunei's heritage and generating opportunities for related sectors like transportation, food, and hospitality. BEDB partnered with the Ministry of Development and MIPR to promote e-business and information and communications technology initiatives, fostering a knowledge-driven, paperless economy. Its involvement in infrastructure projects, such as the Sultan Haji Omar Ali Saifuddien Bridge completed in 2019, has also enhanced connectivity, tourism, and economic opportunities across Brunei.

=== Pulau Muara Besar ===
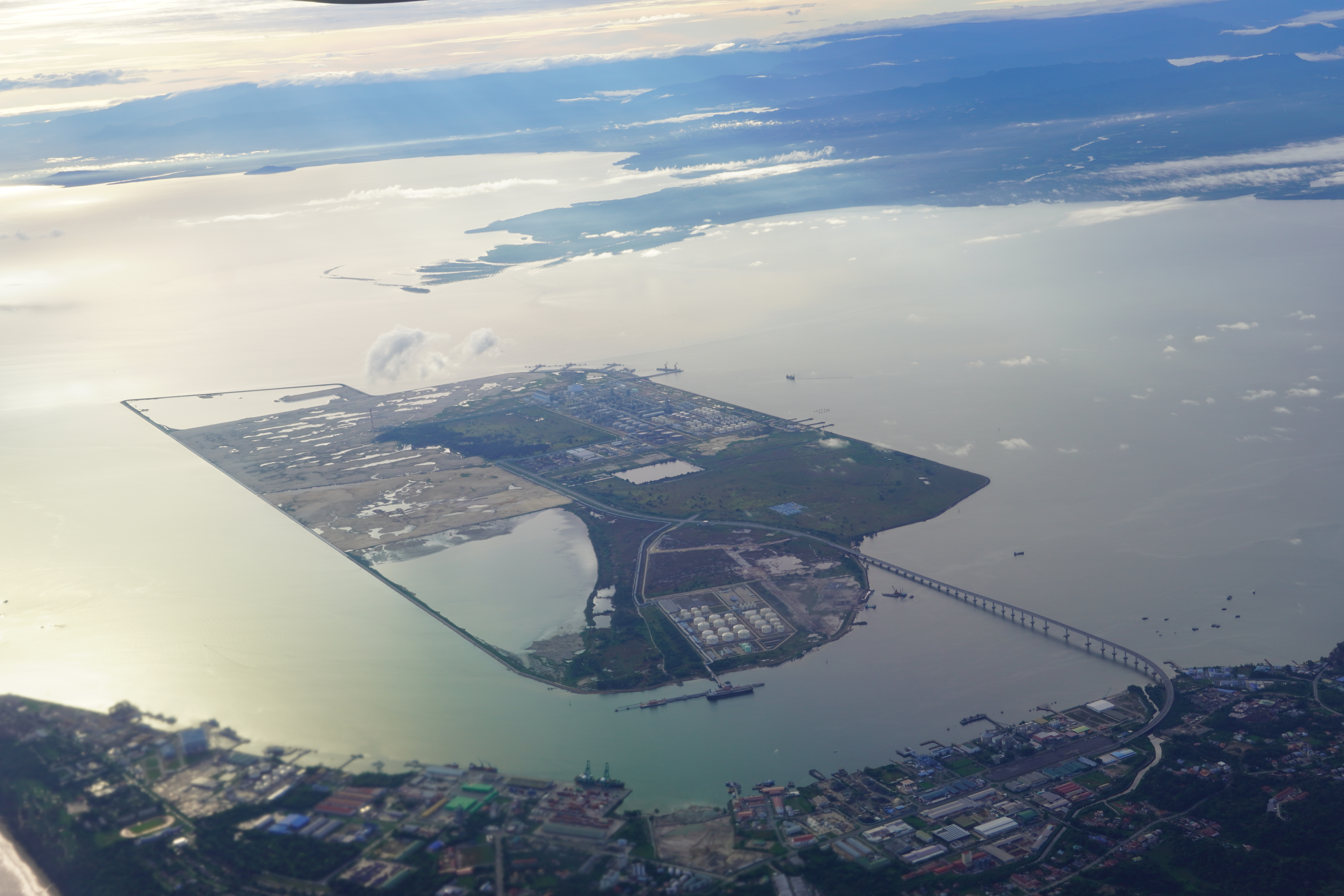
Pulau Muara Besar in 2025

BEDB was a partner in the PMB refinery and petrochemical project alongside China's Zhejiang Hengyi Group. Holding a 30% stake in the US$17.1 billion joint venture, BEDB has facilitated the project's development, ensuring employment and business opportunities for Bruneian citizens, supporting local economic participation, and contributing to the country's industrial diversification. The refinery and petrochemical complex has had a measurable economic impact, accounting for approximately 7.5% of Brunei's GDP in 2021. Connectivity to the island was improved through the completion of the B$204 million Pulau Muara Besar Bridge by China Harbour Engineering in 2019.

In June 2022, it oversaw the establishment of Brunei's first commercial integrated maritime repair and decommissioning yard at PMB through an open bidding process. In July 2024, BEDB partnered with Gulf News to release a report highlighting FDI opportunities in five priority sectors: downstream oil and gas, food, ICT, services, and tourism. Additionally, BEDB signed an agreement with Tipolis to assess a potential joint project in Brunei, initiating a feasibility study and contract negotiations aligned with the goals of Wawasan Brunei 2035.

=== Sungai Liang Industrial Park ===
The Sungai Liang Industrial Park (SPARK) under the Sungai Liang Authority, which features the Brunei Methanol Company and Brunei Fertilizer Industries. Following recommendations from a Monitor Group study, BEDB established SPARK and secured its first tenant, which began producing methanol for export in 2010. The infrastructure for the park was funded through the government's B$9.5 billion RKN 2007–2012 allocation. In addition, BEDB has supported a biodiesel project aimed at promoting alternative energy and creating opportunities for SMEs, with plans to apply a similar development model in Pulau Muara Besar.

== Issues ==
The BEDB faces several challenges in creating an environment conducive to new businesses and industries. Despite royal encouragement to address these issues, concerns about a lack of initiative and poor plan execution remain. Sultan Hassanal Bolkiah's criticisms in 2009 and 2010 highlighted the failure to complete plans on time. Vincent Cheong, CEO of BEDB, suggests that Brunei's small population limits the ability of large enterprises to achieve economies of scale. Additionally, the country's political structure, which relies heavily on the sultan's decisions, has fostered a conservative approach that hinders innovation. Although there has been some progress, Brunei ranked 112th out of 183 countries in the "2011 Doing Business" report. While the government has made efforts, such as reducing corporate tax rates, significant progress in key areas like IT, tourism, and renewable energy has yet to be seen.

== Bibliography ==
- Mahani Hamdan; Hoon, Chang-Yau (2019). "Brunei Darussalam: Making Strides with a Renewed Focus on the Future". Southeast Asian Affairs: 85–102. ISSN 0377-5437. JSTOR 26939689.
- Ong, Victor K. S. (2023). Hu, Richard (ed.). "Bandar Seri Begawan: Why is Brunei's capital chasing foreign dollars?". Routledge Handbook of Asian Cities. Abingdon: Routledge: 318–328. doi:10.4324/9781003256533. ISBN 978-1-000-87809-7.
- Sidhu, Jatswan S. (2009). Historical Dictionary of Brunei Darussalam (2nd ed.). Lanham: Scarecrow Press. ISBN 978-0-8108-7078-9.
- The Brunei Economic Development Board (29 June 2022). "Press Release: Contract Signing For The Project To Invest, Develop, Operate And Maintain An Integrated Marine Maintenance Yard And Decommissioning Yard In Brunei Darussalam" (PDF). Ministry of Finance and Economy.
- The Report: Brunei Darussalam 2007. Oxford Business Group. ISBN 978-1-902339-75-7.
