= List of companies of Brunei =

Location of Brunei in south-east Asia

Brunei Darussalam is a country and sovereign state located on the north coast of the island of Borneo in Southeast Asia. Apart from its coastline with the South China Sea, the country is surrounded by the state of Sarawak, Malaysia. The remainder of Borneo, and its geographically largest part is Kalimantan, part of Indonesia.

Economic growth during the 1990s and 2000s, with its gross domestic product (GDP) increasing 56% from 1999 to 2008, transformed Brunei into an industrialised country. It has developed wealth from extensive petroleum and natural gas fields. Brunei has the second-highest Human Development Index (HDI) among the Southeast Asian nations, after Singapore, and is classified as a 'developed country' by the United Nations. According to the International Monetary Fund (IMF), Brunei is ranked fifth in the world by gross domestic product per capita at purchasing power parity. The IMF estimated, in 2011, that Brunei was one of two countries (the other being Libya) with a public debt at 0% of the national GDP. In 2012, Forbes also ranks Brunei as the fifth-richest nation out of 182, based on its petroleum and natural gas fields.

With the recent weakening of the country's economy due to pressure on oil prices, Brunei has adopted hardline sharia law to try to gain local public support. In 2019, the country issued a new law making gay sex and adultery punishable by stoning to death, even for foreigners or non-Muslims, leading to a boycott of Brunei-related businesses primarily targeting hotels owned by the Sultan of Brunei and Royal Brunei Airlines.

== Notable companies ==
This list includes notable companies with primary headquarters located in Brunei Darussalam. The industry and sector follow the Industry Classification Benchmark taxonomy. Organisations which have ceased operations are included and noted as defunct.

Notable companies Status: P=Private, S=State; A=Active, D=Defunct
Name	Industry	Sector	Headquarters	Founded	Notes	Status	
Baiduri Bank	Financials	Banks	Bandar Seri Begawan	1994	State bank	S	A
Bank Islam Brunei Darussalam	Financials	Banks	Bandar Seri Begawan	2005	State bank	S	A
Brunei Darussalam Central Bank	Financials	Banking	Bandar Seri Begawan	2011	Current central bank	S	A
Brunei Energy Services and Trading	Oil & gas	Integrated oil & gas	Bandar Seri Begawan	2002	State oil and gas company	S	A
Brunei Fertilizer Industries	Industrials	Industrial goods & services	Sungai Liang	2013	Fertilizer plant	S	A
Brunei Investment Agency	Financials	Investment services	Bandar Seri Begawan	1983	Sovereign wealth fund	S	A
Brunei LNG	Oil & gas	Exploration & production	Lumut	1969	Joint venture between the government of Brunei, Mitsubishi Corporation and Brunei Shell Petroleum	P	A
Brunei Methanol Company	Petrochemical	Exploration & production	Sungai Liang	2006	Joint venture between Mitsubishi Gas Chemical Company, Itochu Corporation and Mirkhas	P	A
Brunei Shell Petroleum	Oil & gas	Exploration & production	Panaga	1957	Joint venture between Shell plc and the government of Brunei	P	A
Hua Ho Department Store	Consumer services	Broadline retailers	Bandar Seri Begawan	1947	Founded by Lau Ah Kok	P	A
Imagine	Telecommunications	Fixed line telecommunications	Bandar Seri Begawan	2005	Telecommunications, formerly TelBru	P	A
QAF Brunei	Financials	Conglomerate	Bandar Seri Begawan	1982	Owned by Prince Mohamed Bolkiah	P	A
Royal Brunei Airlines	Consumer services	Airline	Bandar Seri Begawan	1974	National airline	S	A

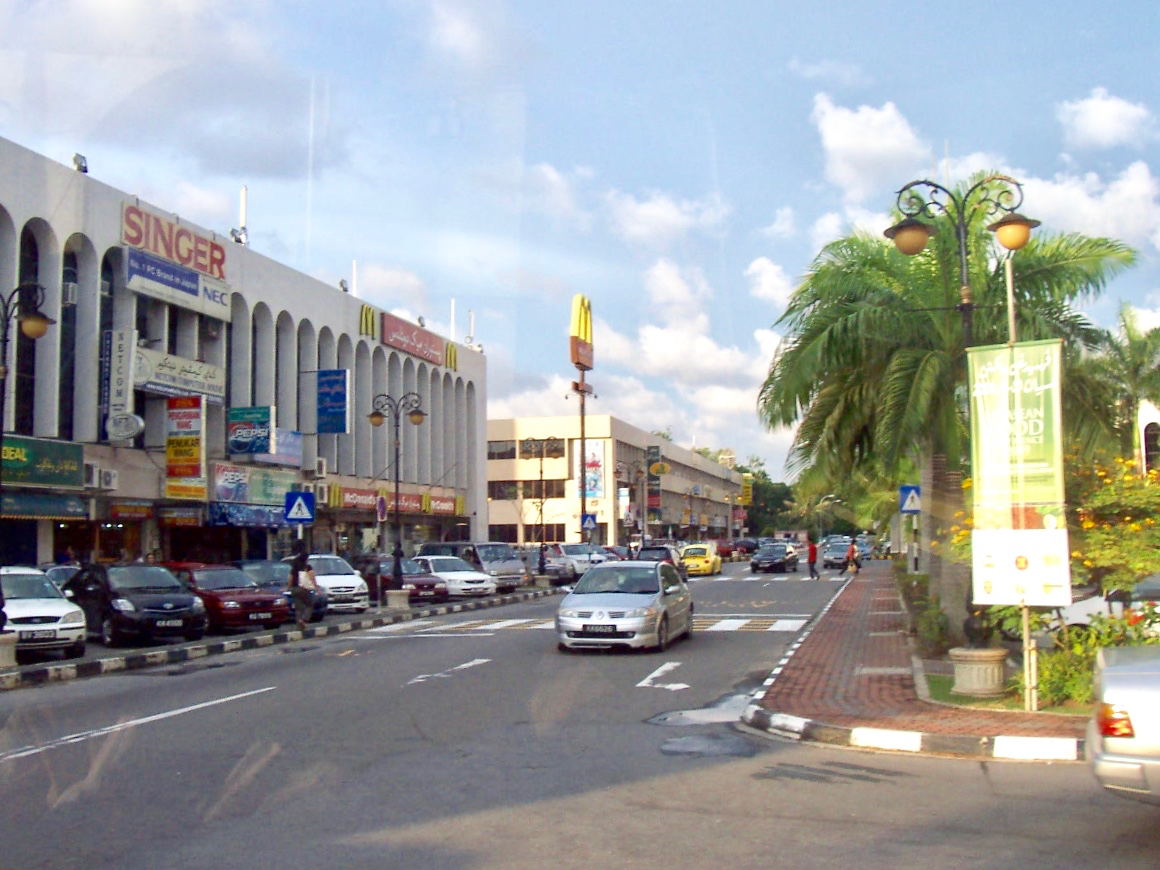
Street in Gadong, the main shopping centre of Bandar Seri Begawan

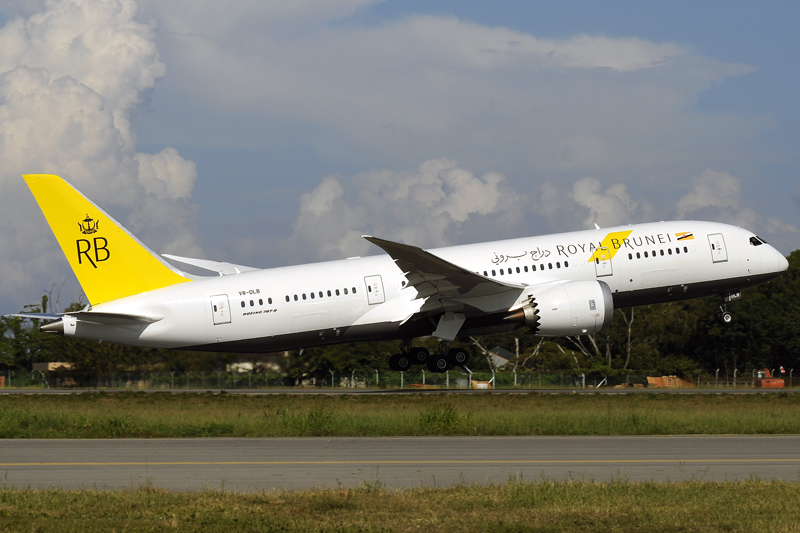
A Royal Brunei Airlines Boeing 787 Dreamliner departing Kota Kinabalu
