= Brunei Methanol Company =

Petrochemical company in Brunei

Coordinates: 4.6721369°N 114.4730090°E

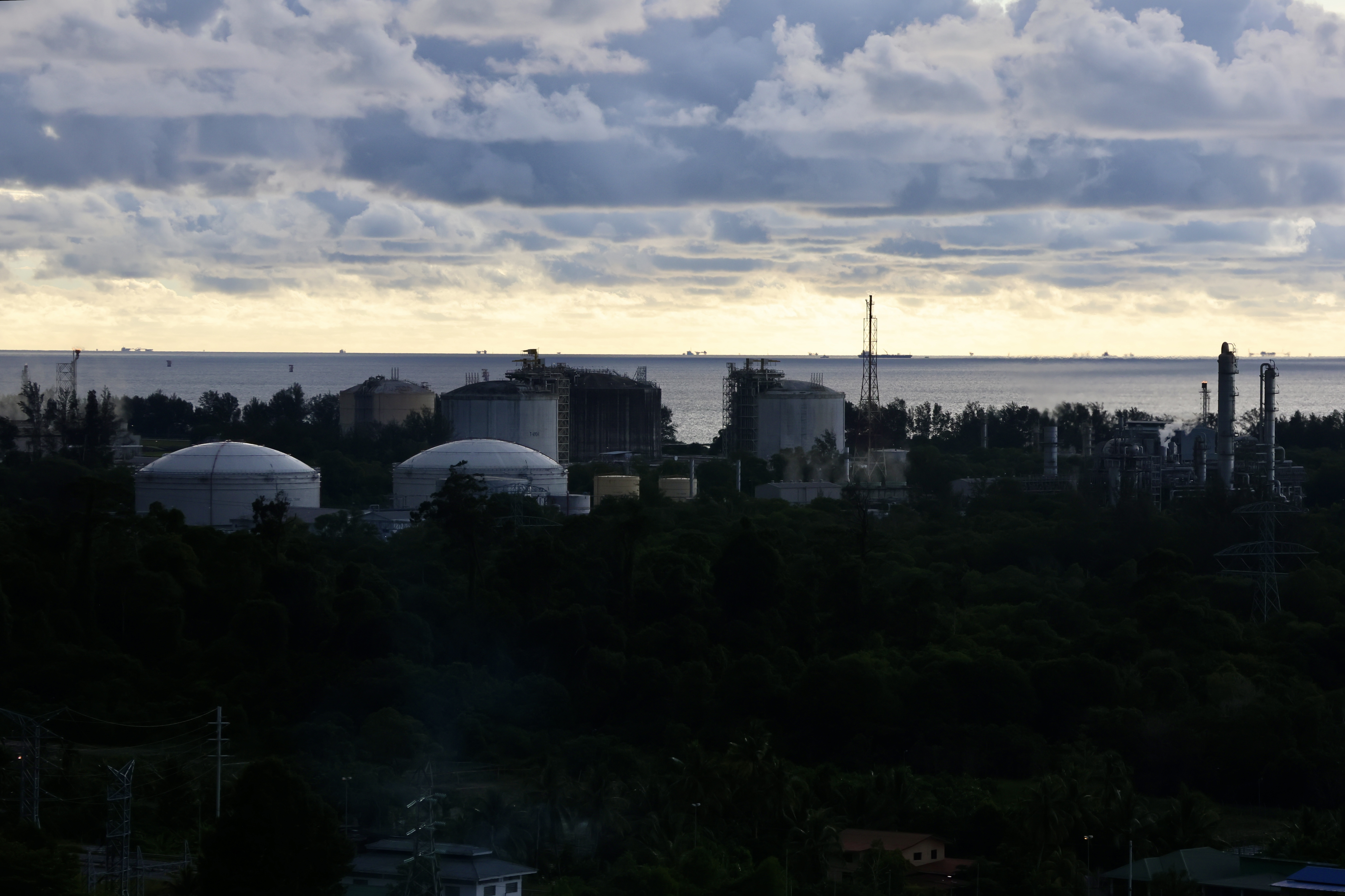
- The methanol plant in 2024
- Type: LLC
- Industry: Energy
- Founded: 13 March 2006; 20 years ago
- Headquarters: Kampong Sungai Liang, Belait District, Brunei
- Key people: CEO: Jesús Enrique Mora Marín
- Products: Methanol
- Owner: Mitsubishi Gas Chemical Company (50%); Itochu Corporation (25%); Mirkhas Sdn Bhd (25%)
- Website: brunei-methanol.com

Brunei Methanol Company (BMC) is a national petrochemical facility situated at the Sungai Liang Industrial Park (SPARK) in Sungai Liang, Brunei jointly owned by Japan's Mitsubishi Gas Chemical Company (50%), ITOCHU Corporation (25%) and Mirkhas (25%), a company incorporated under the purview of the Strategic Development Capital Fund, a trust sub-fund of the Government of Brunei.

BMC’s plant has a daily production capacity to produce up to 2,500 metric tonnes or 850,000 metric tonnes of Grade AA methanol per year, which is converted from natural gas supplied by Brunei Shell Petroleum (BSP). This project aligns with the goals of Wawasan Brunei 2035, aiming to diversify Brunei’s economy and add value to the oil and gas sector by strengthening the downstream economy, reducing dependence on the oil and gas industry and ensuring the economy is sustainable for the future generations.

== History ==
A joint venture agreement was signed between the Mitsubishi Gas Chemical Company, PetroleumBRUNEI and Itochu Corporation on 21 November 2005. The Company was incorporated as a private limited company on 13 March 2006. The construction of the company’s methanol manufacturing plant was financed under Japan Bank for International Cooperation, with participation from several other commercial bank lenders on 5 May 2007, marking the first international project financing loan that JBIC has provided for a downstream project in Brunei.

Groundbreaking for the methanol plant project began on 30 November 2007, signifying the start of plant construction. Mitsubishi Heavy Industries Ltd was responsible for the engineering, procurement, and construction of the methanol plant. The foundation laying ceremony was officiated by Crown Prince Al-Muhtadee Billah on 11 February 2008. Construction works of the methanol plant was completed in 2009.

The USD600 million 16-hectare plant was officially inaugurated by Sultan Hassanal Bolkiah on 25 May 2010. As of 2010, BMC obtained its natural gas supply from BSP for its methanol production, in a 21-year gas sales agreement. The first drop of methanol was witnessed on 27 April 2010, marking the start of Brunei Darussalam’s utilisation of its own natural resources to produce value-added products. On 21 June 2018, the Bruneianisation Directive introduced by the Minister of Energy and Industry, Mat Suny, requiring Bruneian oil and gas operators to gradually achieve 90% Bruneians at all levels and skill-pools.

The full repayment of the JBIC's project financing loan was completed on 14 December 2022. On 29 October 2024, BMC recorded over ten million man-hours without a lost time injury.

== Market reach and industrial uses ==
Asia has a considerable need for methanol, and Brunei's geographic location gives them an economic advantage when it comes to supplying the region. The markets in Northeast and Southeast Asia, which consisted of China, Japan, South Korea, Taiwan, Indonesia, Malaysia, Philippines, Singapore, Thailand, Vietnam, India, and Brunei Darussalam, are the main recipients of the methanol generated by BMC. The Federal Grade AA Methanol, is a commodity for the chemical and petrochemical industries in the manufacturing of acetic acid (solvents), MTBE (octane enhancer), Formaldehyde (resins, adhesives), and other products.

== Export and loading facilities ==
To ensure smooth cargo transfer operations, BMC's Single Point Mooring (SPM) infrastructure acts as a crucial hub for exporting methanol. Under a 22-year commercial lease agreement, Darussalam Enterprise (DE) provides the methanol export facilities. With the first-ever foreign delivery of methanol to South Korea on 12 May 2010, Brunei made history by entering the global methanol export market through BMC's methanol export facilities (offshore).

BMC opened its Domestic Loading Facility (Onshore) on 29 November 2023. The facility was built to make methanol accessible to the local market in Brunei. BMC finished its inland product methanol loading after the introduction, which marked the first methanol sale in Brunei's domestic market. A major component of BMC's collaboration deal with the Brunei Economic Development Board (BEDB) to help national downstream sectors as part of the efforts to diversify is this recent breakthrough in the supply of methanol.

== See also ==
- Oil and natural gas in Brunei
