= Department of Economic Planning and Statistics =

Government agency of Brunei

- Jabatan Perancangan Ekonomi dan Statistik جابتن ڤرانچڠن ايكونومي دان ستاتيستيك
- National emblem of Brunei

Agency overview
- Formed: 1 January 1997; 29 years ago
- Preceding agencies: Economic Planning Unit; Economic Development Board
- Jurisdiction: Government of Brunei
- Headquarters: Ministry of Finance and Economy, Block 2A, Jalan Ong Sum Ping, Bandar Seri Begawan BA1311, Brunei
- Ministers responsible: Sultan Hassanal Bolkiah, Minister of Finance and Economy; Amin Liew Abdullah, Minister of Finance and Economy II
- Agency executives: Mariah Yahya, Director General; Asrul Adrain, Deputy Director General
- Parent agency: Ministry of Finance and Economy
- Child agencies: Corporate Affairs Section; Department of Planning; Department of Statistics; Department of Consumer Affairs
- Website: deps.mofe.gov.bn

The Department of Economic Planning and Statistics (DEPS) (Note: Malay: Jabatan Perancangan Ekonomi dan Statistik (JPES); Jawi: جابتن ڤرانچڠن ايكونومي دان ستاتيستيك) is a government department overseen by the Ministry of Finance and Economy (MoFE). The department is in accordance to Wawasan Brunei 2035, it wants to support Brunei's long-term, sustainable economic growth by providing globally-recognised statistical data, implementation of the National Development Plan (NDP), and planning.

== Goals and objectives ==
In order to achieve Wawasan Brunei 2035's objectives of progressive and sustainable economic growth, the DEPS is dedicated to creating comprehensive economic development plans that are backed by data and research. DEPS is also in charge of enforcing the Consumer Protection (Fair Trade) Order, 2011 and the Price Control Act, Chapter 142. The organisation is dedicated to improving market efficiency and protecting the interests of consumers throughout the nation. In order to achieve its goals, DEPS is dedicated to the following essential tasks:

- Evaluating and keeping an eye on Brunei's economic growth while using strategic economic planning to handle possibilities and difficulties.
- Interacting with stakeholders and offering predictions and important macroeconomic indicators to direct the development of sustainable economic policies and strategies.
- Creating and distributing, in accordance with international standards, high-quality, timely, accurate, and easily available data to aid in national development.
- Directing the National Statistical System to function as the principal source for socioeconomic data at the national level.
- Implementing the Consumer Protection (Fair Trading) Order, 2011 in order to provide consumers with recourse against unethical businesses and to foster a just commercial environment.
- Implementing and upholding the Price Control Act to guarantee the stability of prices for necessities.

The National Development Plan Working Committee, National Data Coordination Steering Committee, and Macroeconomic Development Committee are just a few of the important national bodies for which DEPS acts as the Secretariat. Additionally, it collaborates with global institutions like the International Comparison Program (ICP) for Asia and the Pacific of the Asian Development Bank (ADB) and the ASEAN Community Statistical System (ACSS) Committee. DEPS also communicates with the ASEAN Committee on Consumer Protection (ACCP) and the United Nations ESCAP Civil Registration and Vital Statistics.

== Attached agencies ==
DEPS is divided into the following three departments and one section:

- Corporate Affairs Section (Pejabat Hal Ehwal Korporat) — oversees financial services, human resource management, information-communication technology requirements, asset and facilities management, personnel and administrative services, a clean and safe work environment, and public relations issues.
- Department of Planning (Jabatan Perancangan) — to predict macroeconomic indicators, guide the growth of the private sector, analyse economic data, and track economic advancement.
- Department of Statistics (Jabatan Perangkaan; DOS) — collects and gathers information from several sources, including as surveys and administrative data, to generate and distribute official statistics to the general public, decision-makers, scholars, and corporations via its website, publications, reports, social networking sites, and data visualisation applications.
- Department of Consumer Affairs (Jabatan Hal Ehwal Pengguna; JHEP) — works to advance consumer protection in Brunei by monitoring price restrictions for necessities, creating awareness campaigns, responding to consumer complaints, and coordinating national policy. It serves as the main hub for global consumer protection issues and upholds moral corporate conduct by keeping an eye on pricing and sales displays.

== History ==
On 21 May 1973, the Economic Planning Unit (EPU) was founded under the State Secretariat Office. On 1 January 1976, the Economic Development Board (EDB) was created. The Ministry of Finance (MoF) received the Computer Section of EPU on 1 January 1993, and the Insurance Section of EDB on 14 March 1993, when they were transferred to the Financial Institution Division of the MoF. On 7 March 1995, the EDB's Tourism Section was shifted to the Ministry of Industry and Primary Resources, and on 31 March 1995, a few EDB employees were transferred to the Development Bank of Brunei. On 15 June 1996, the Ministry of Home Affairs' Weight and Measures Section was merged into EPU.

Following this, on 1 January 1997, EPU and EDB combined to become the Department of Economic Planning and Development (DEPD), which is housed inside the MoF. DEPD and the Secretariat of the Brunei Darussalam Economic Council (BDEC) were combined into a single department under the Prime Minister's Office from 1 March 2001, till 2018. The DEPD was renamed the Department of Economic Planning and Statistics (DEPS) in 2019 and moved to the MoFE.

== Legislation ==
=== Consumer Protection (Fair Trading) Order (2011) ===
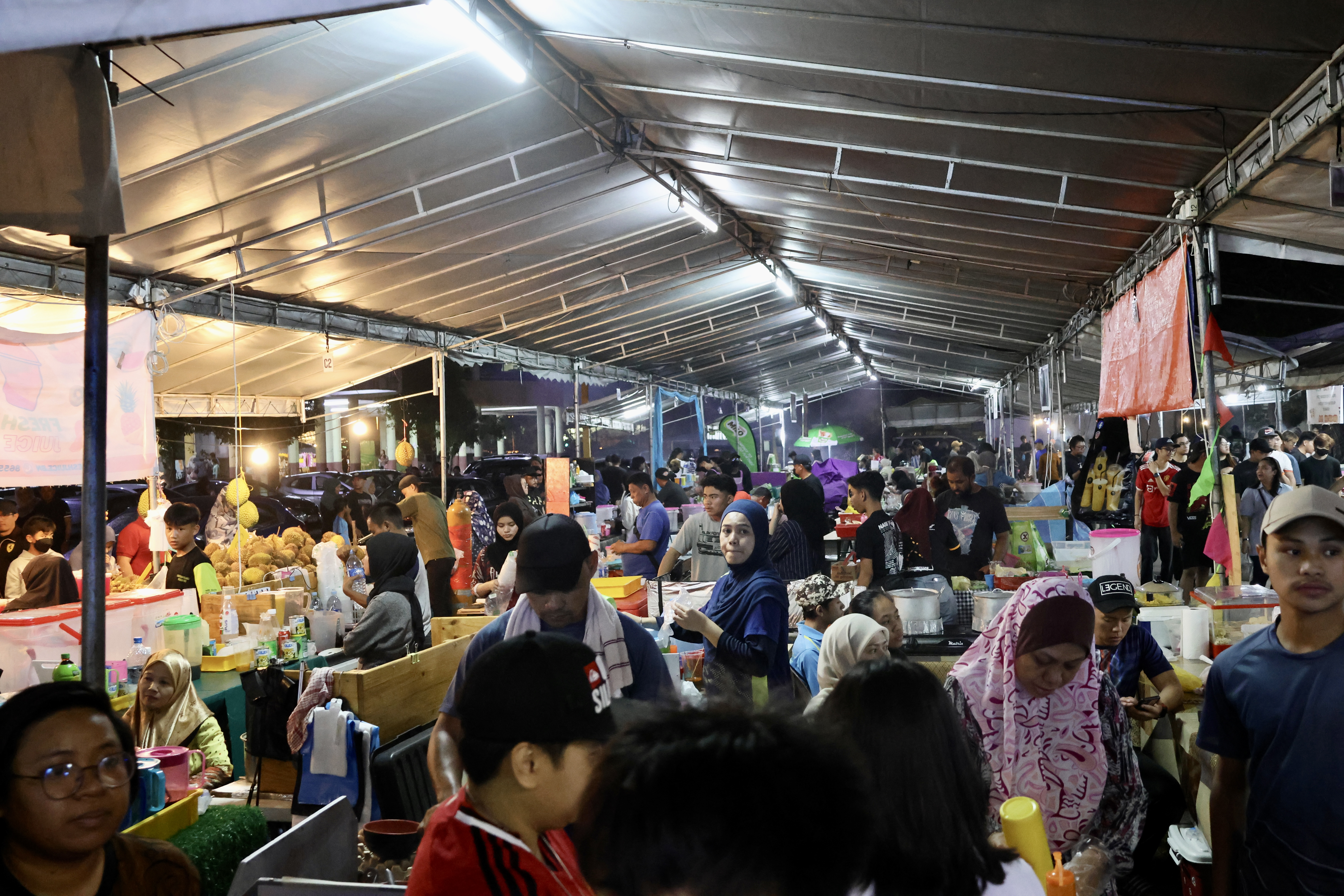
A street market in Kuala Belait

Customers are protected from dishonest acts by merchants under the Consumer Protection (Fair Trading) Order, 2011 (CPTFO). It covers topics including making false promises, misleading or deceiving customers, and taking advantage of those who are weak to defend their own interests or comprehend the deal. CPTFO is applicable to transactions done in or out of Brunei, as well as to enterprises and consumers there. Customers who buy products or services for their own use rather than for resale are particularly protected from unfair business-to-consumer (B2C) activities.

CPTFO excludes transactions involving estate property, employment services, and those already regulated by other Brunei regulations or agencies. To stop unfair practices, companies may be urged to sign a Voluntary Compliance Agreement (VCA), which might contain promises to refund expenses or make good on lost profits to customers and be made public by the media. On 1 January 2012, the CPFTO went into effect with two regulations and twenty sections.

=== Price Control Act, Chapter 142 ===
After being first implemented on 13 March 1974, and going through many revisions, the Price Control Act (Cap 142) was further modified on 13 November 2012, with the passage of the Price Control Act (Amendment) Order 2012. The 2012 amendment's goals are to restrict appropriate price rises, guarantee fair promotional activities, assist the building sector and general national growth, and regulate the cost of necessities for low-income Bruneians. The act specifies that business premises that fail to show price tags for specific goods supplied there and sold at a price higher than the maximum amount determined after an inspection will get warning notices. There is a B$1,000 maximum penalties for noncompliance. Repeat offenders may be fined up to B$20,000 and imprisoned for a maximum of five years.

With effect from 23 November, Sultan Hassanal Bolkiah issued the Price Control Act (Amendment) Order 2021, which updated and strengthened enforcement procedures to better reflect the state of the economy. The Price Control (Maximum Prices and Charges) (Amendment) Order 2021 and the Price Control (Minimum Price and Charges) (Repeal) Order 2021 are also amended by the amendment, enabling DEPS to oversee and enforce pricing, particularly in times of emergency such as the COVID-19 pandemic. Retailers will be penalised for not cooperating with inspections and supplying information; moreover, the list of regulated products will be revised on a regular basis to include government-subsidised items.

== Publications ==
The publications of JPES are as follows:

- National Development Plan (NDP)/Rancangan Kemajuan Negara (RKN)
- Population Census (PC)
- Economic Census of Enterprises (ECE)
- Population And Housing Census (PHC)
- Quarterly National Account (QNA)
- Annual National Account (ANA)
- Brunei Darussalam External Trade Statistic (BDETS)
- International Merchandise Trade Statistics (IMTS)
- Brunei Darussalam Key Indicators (BDKI)
- Brunei Darussalam Supply, Use and Input-Output Tables (BDSUT)
- Quarterly Statistical Indicators (QSI)
- Brunei Darussalam Statistical Yearbook (BDSY)
- Brunei Darussalam Vital Statistic (BDVS)
- Household Expenditure Survey (HES)
- Labour Force Survey (LFS)
- Demographic Situation & Population Projections (DSP)
- Strategic Plan (SP)
- Brunei Darussalam Long-Term Development Plan (BDLTP)
- Millennium Development and Beyond (MDG)
