= BFI (disambiguation) =

BFI is the British Film Institute, a charitable organisation.

BFI may also refer to:

== Airports ==
- Boeing Field, Seattle, Washington, United States (by IATA airport code)

== Companies ==
- Browning-Ferris Industries, American waste collection company
  - BFI Canada, non-hazardous solid waste management company in North America
- Brunei Fertilizer Industries, Bruneian state owned ammonia and urea granular fertilizer producing company

== Education ==
- Le baccalauréat français international, a bilingual secondary education diploma in France

== Governmental entities ==
- Bureau of Fraud Investigation, Irish national police division responsible for investigating fraudulent activity

== Non-commercial enterprises ==
- Big Five Inventory, survey for measuring Big Five personality traits
- Baby Friendly Initiative (UK), pro-breastfeeding campaign run by UNICEF UK as part of global Baby Friendly Hospital Initiative
- Becker Friedman Institute for Research in Economics, cross-disciplinary center for research in economics at University of Chicago
- Buckminster Fuller Institute, US charitable institution dedicated to propagating ideas of Buckminster Fuller

== Sports ==
- Basketball Federation of India

== Technology ==
- Black Frame Insertion
