= Tourism in Brunei =

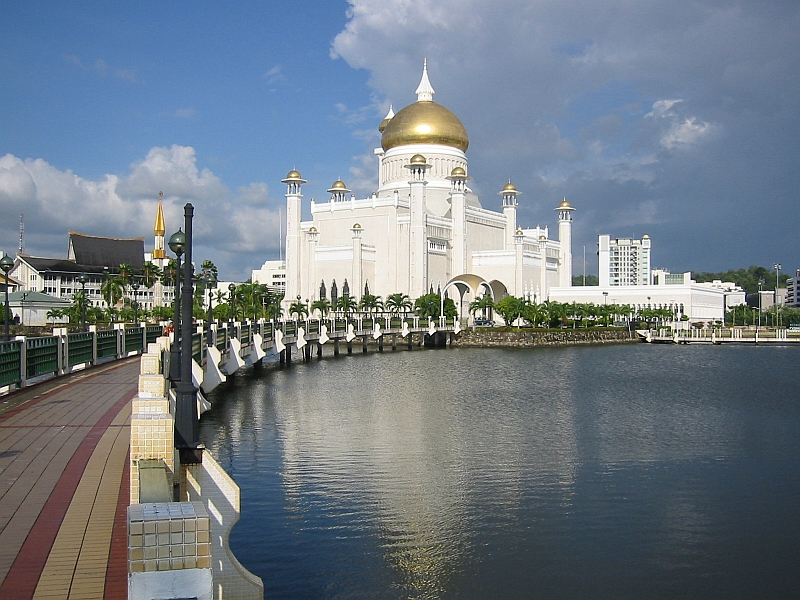
Sultan Omar Ali Saifuddin Mosque

Tourism in Brunei is governed by the Ministry of Primary Resources and Tourism, which is planning to diversify Brunei's tourism to include adventure tourism, ecotourism and Islamic tourism.

== Overview ==
The Brunei dollar is one of strongest currencies in the Association of Southeast Asian Nations (ASEAN) region, a factor discouraging tourists in the region from visiting Brunei. One Brunei dollar is equal to around 10,740 Indonesian rupiah, 3.10 Malaysian ringgit, 36.2 Philippine peso and 23.6 Thai baht. According to some travel agencies, because of Brunei's strong currency tour packages are expensive compared with those of other countries in the region; local tourists prefer other ASEAN countries, although tourists from outside the ASEAN prefer Brunei. In 2014, 95 percent of foreign tourists arrived in Brunei by land; four percent arrived by air, and one percent by sea.

== Statistics ==
Source: Tourism Development Department, Ministry of Primary Resources and Tourism; Immigration and Registration Department, Ministry of Home Affairs; and Brunei shipping agencies.

Arrivals

| | 2016 | 2017 | 2018 | 2019 | 2020 | 2021 |
|---|---|---|---|---|---|---|
| Land | 4,013,325 | 4,046,143 | 4,224,440 | 4,100,635 | 1,006,763 | 106,848 |
| Air | 218,809 | 258,955 | 278,136 | 333,244 | 62,325 | 3,543 |
| Sea | 25,055 | 10,886 | 18,760 | 15,149 | 1,526 | 0 |
| Total | 4,257,189 | 4,315,984 | 4,521,336 | 4,449,028 | 1,070,614 | 110,391 |
| Growth (year-on-year) | +4.9% | +1.4% | +4.8% | -1.6% | -75.9% | -89.7% |

Note: The number of arrivals for 2020 and 2021 decreased due to the outbreak of the COVID-19 pandemic. All land and sea borders were closed starting from March 2020 with the exception of 'essential travelers' who were allowed entry mainly for the purpose of official visits, family, education, businesses and employment. The borders reopened on 1 August 2022 and arrivals are expected to increase again.

Registered Travel Agents

| | 2016 | 2017 | 2018 | 2019 | 2020 | 2021 |
|---|---|---|---|---|---|---|
| Number of travel agents | 60 | 65 | 57 | 57 | 53 | 45 |

Tourist Receipts

| | 2020 | 2021 |
|---|---|---|
| Amount ($BND) | $20.8 million | $1.3 million |

== Government initiatives ==
The Brunei government budgeted $300,000 for tourism in 2015, and provisions for tourism were also made in the country's National Development Plan (RKN). Brunei is seeking foreign direct investment in tourism and collaboration with a number of agencies.

=== Tutong Destination Programme ===
The Tutong Destination Programme is a pilot project to increase tourism in Tutong District, a major tourist destination in the country. The programme, created by the district government in collaboration with travel agencies and the NGOs, began in 2013. More than 2,000 tourists have visited Tutong (which has more than 30 potential tourist destinations) since the project was introduced. The district was visited by 50 delegates from the Brunei-Indonesia-Malaysia-Philippines East ASEAN Growth Area (BIMP-EAGA).

=== Bird Watching Workshop 2015 ===
Birdwatching is one aspect of nature tourism identified in the Brunei Tourism Masterplan. In 2015, a three-day birdwatching workshop was sponsored by the Tourism Development Department of Brunei in collaboration with Sunshine Borneo Tours and Travel, the Malaysian Nature Society (MNS), the Birding Conservation Council (BCC) and volunteers from the Brunei Birders Group.

== Recommendations ==
Islam is the state religion of Brunei, and tourists should observe Islamic etiquette. Everybody should dress modestly in conservative and rural areas. During the month of Ramadan, visitors are not permitted to drink or eat during the day in public areas. Most major tourist attractions in Brunei are Islamic mosques. Foreign, non-Muslim tourists in proper attire may enter mosques; women should cover their head, shoulders and knees. Although the sale of alcohol is prohibited in Brunei, non-Muslims over age 17 may bring two bottles of liquor or wine and 12 cans of beer into the country; 48 hours must elapse between each importation.

== Major attractions ==
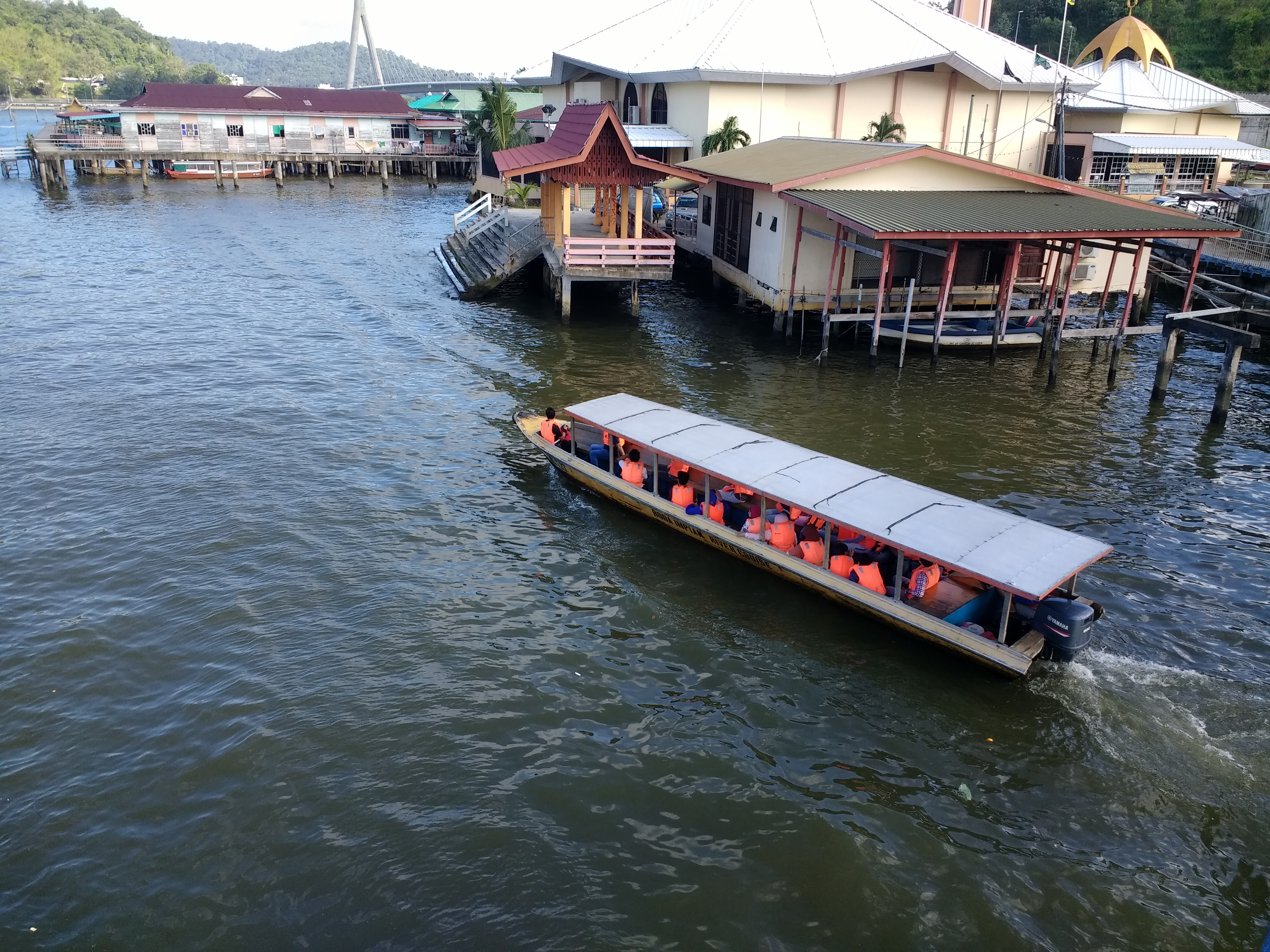
A tour boat visiting Kampong Ayer

Brunei is noted for ecotourism and cultural, heritage and Islamic tourism.

=== Cultural, heritage and Islamic tourism Attractions ===
- Sultan Omar Ali Saifuddin Mosque in Brunei's capital, Bandar Seri Begawan
- Brunei Museum
- Istana Nurul Iman: Palace and official residence of the Sultan of Brunei
- Jerudong Park: Amusement park
- Malay Technology Museum
- Jame'Asr Hassanil Bolkiah Mosque
- Kampong Ayer in Bandar Seri Begawan
- Oil and Gas Discovery Centre in Seria, Belait District

=== Ecotourism Attractions ===
- Ulu Temburong National Park in the Temburong District

== Gallery ==
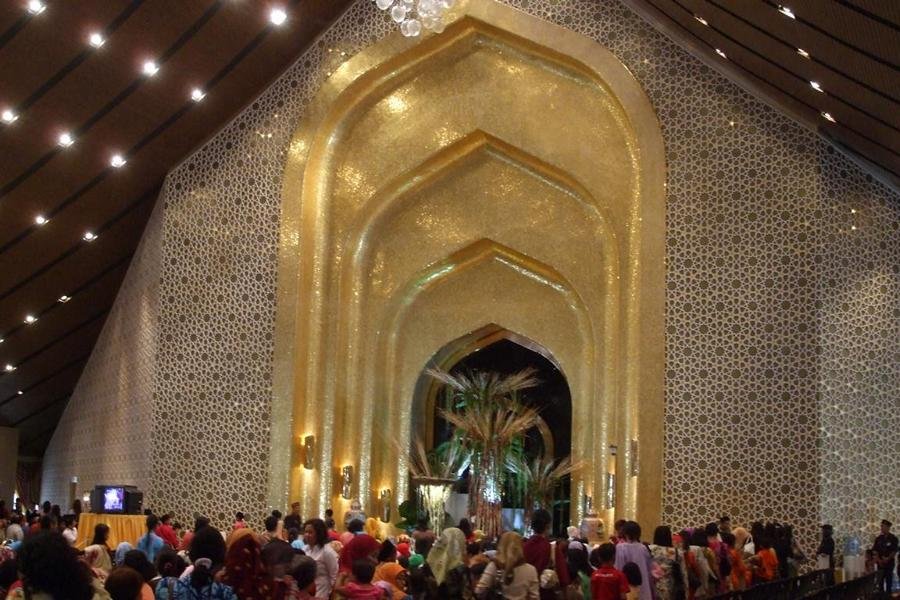
Hall in Istana Nurul Iman

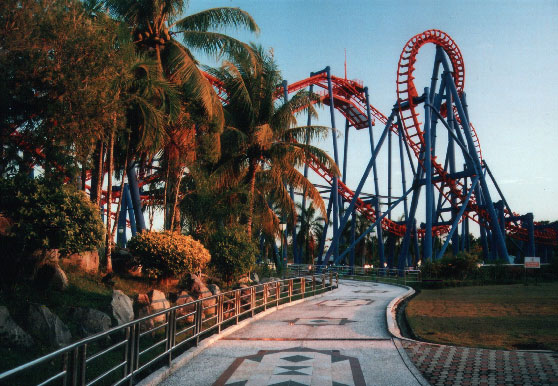
Jerudong Park

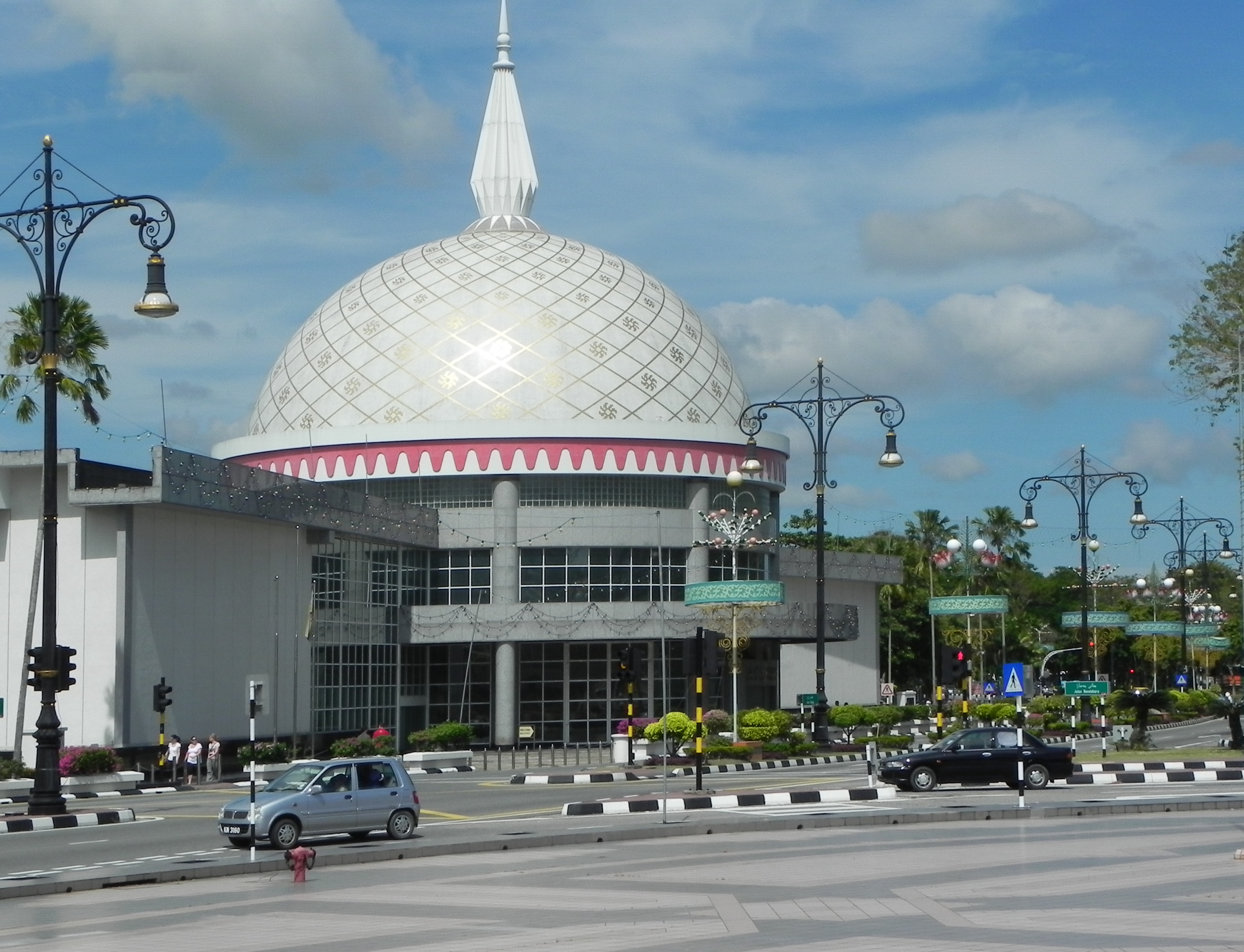
Royal Regalia

== See also ==
- Visa policy of Brunei
