= Ministry of Finance Building, Brunei =

Coordinates: 4°55′18″N 114°57′09″E

Ministry of Finance Brunei
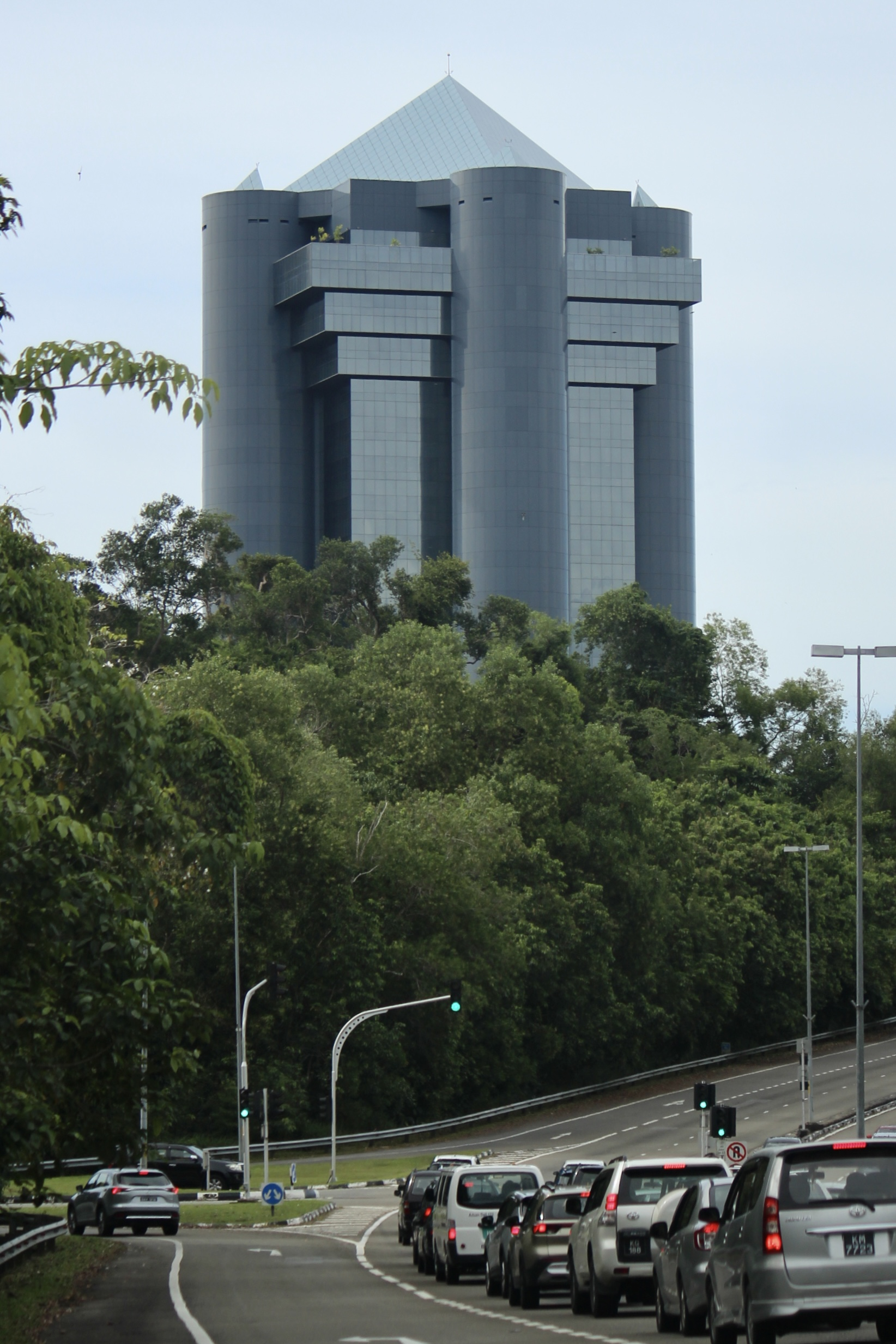
- Ministry of Finance Brunei in 2022
- Interactive map of the Ministry of Finance Brunei area

General information
- Status: Completed
- Type: Office, restaurant
- Location: Bandar Seri Begawan, Brunei
- Construction started: 1990
- Completed: 1992
- Opening: 2001
- Cost: (US$100 million)
- Owner: Government of Brunei

Height
- Roof: 120 m (390 ft)

Technical details
- Floor count: 21

Design and construction
- Architect: Kohn Pedersen Fox
- Developer: Mori Building Company
- Structural engineer: Leslie E. Robertson Associates RLLP

The Ministry of Finance Building and Complex in Bandar Seri Begawan, Brunei, was constructed in 1990. With a height of 120 metres, it is the tallest building in the country and the fourth tallest building on Borneo.

The building houses the Ministry of Finance Brunei, the Brunei Currency and Monetary Board and the Brunei Investment Agency. The building is located five kilometers outside of Downtown Bandar Seri Begawan.

== See also ==
- List of towers
