= Kampong Sungai Liang =

Village in Brunei

Kampong Sungai Liang Kampung Sungai Liang
- Village
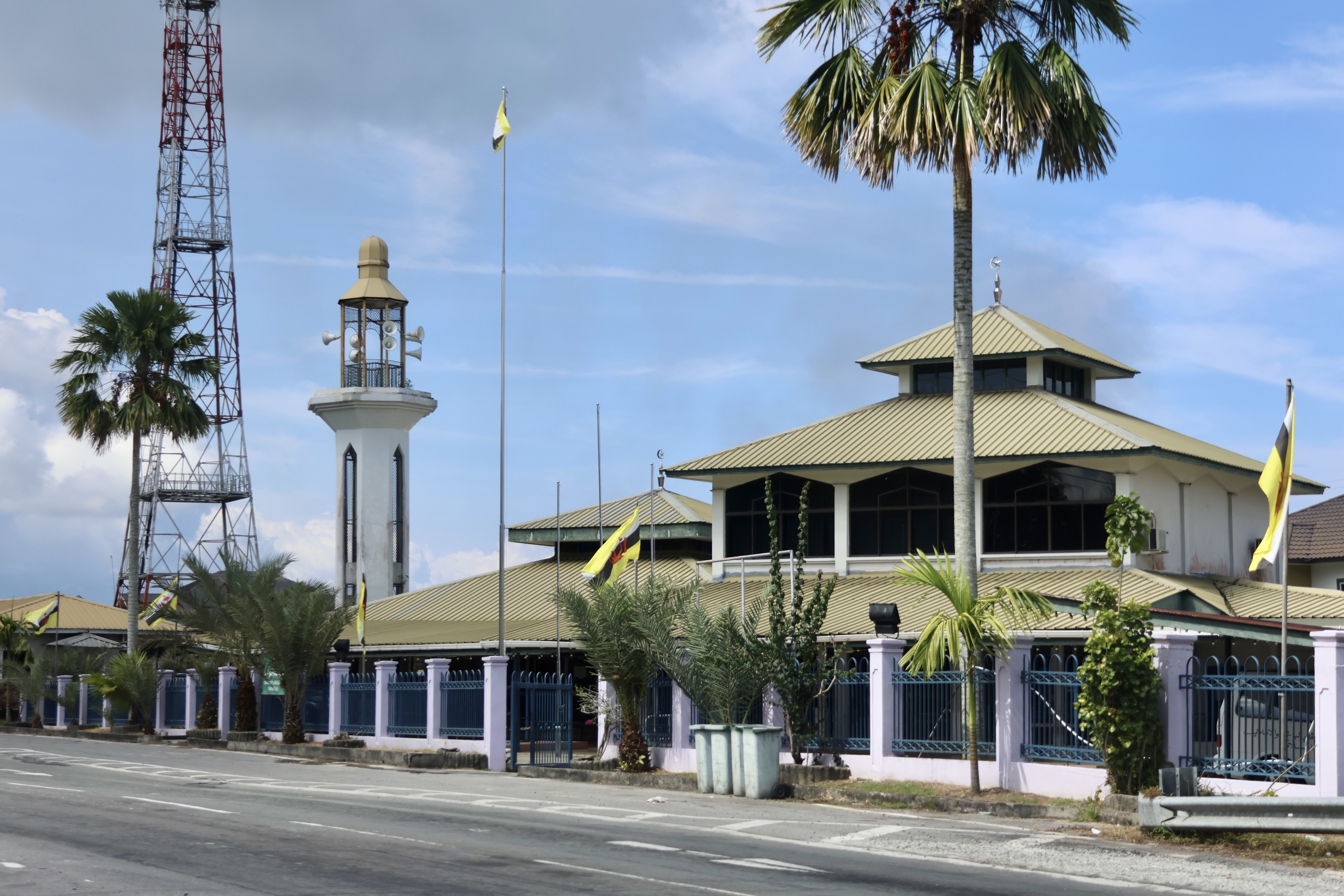
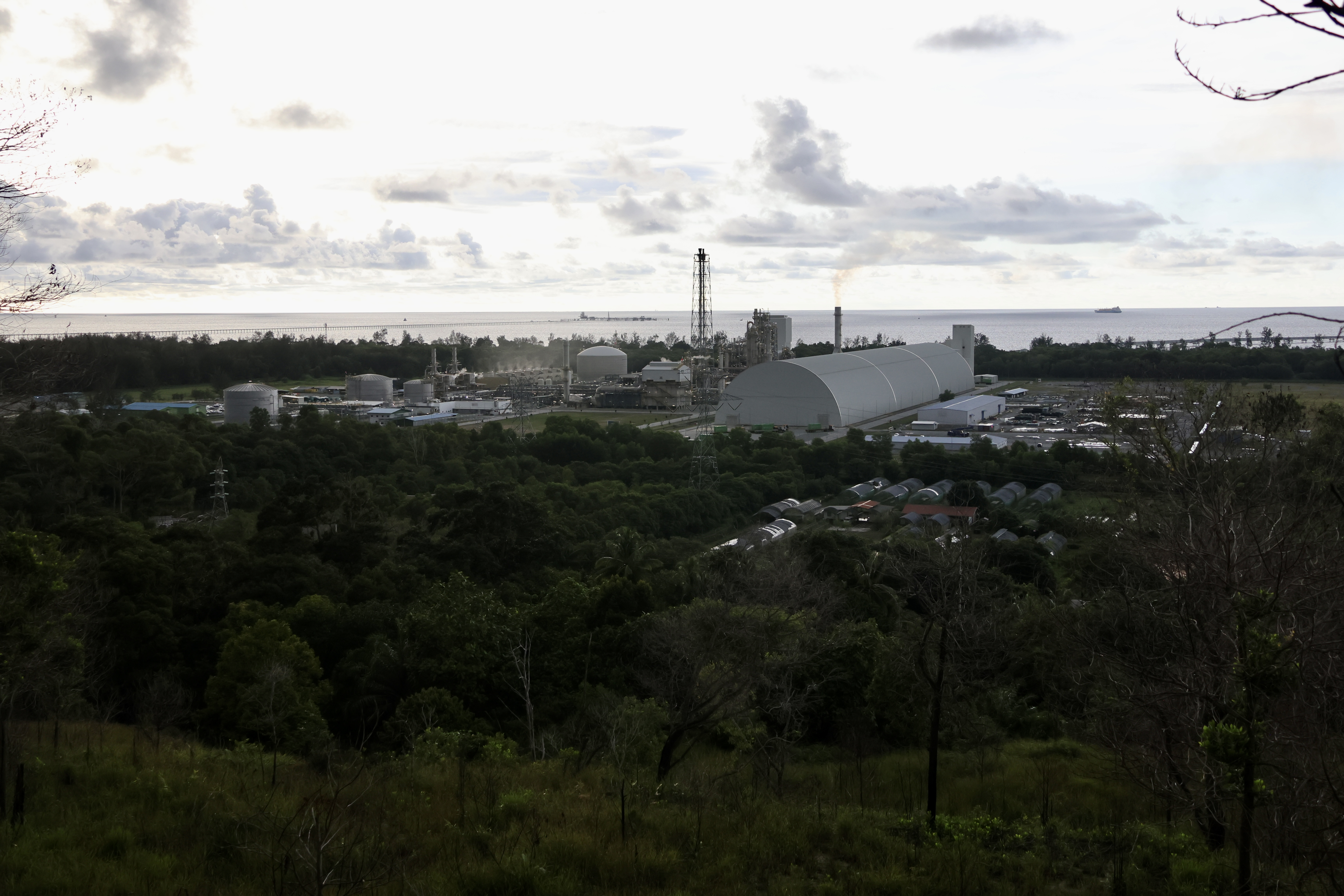
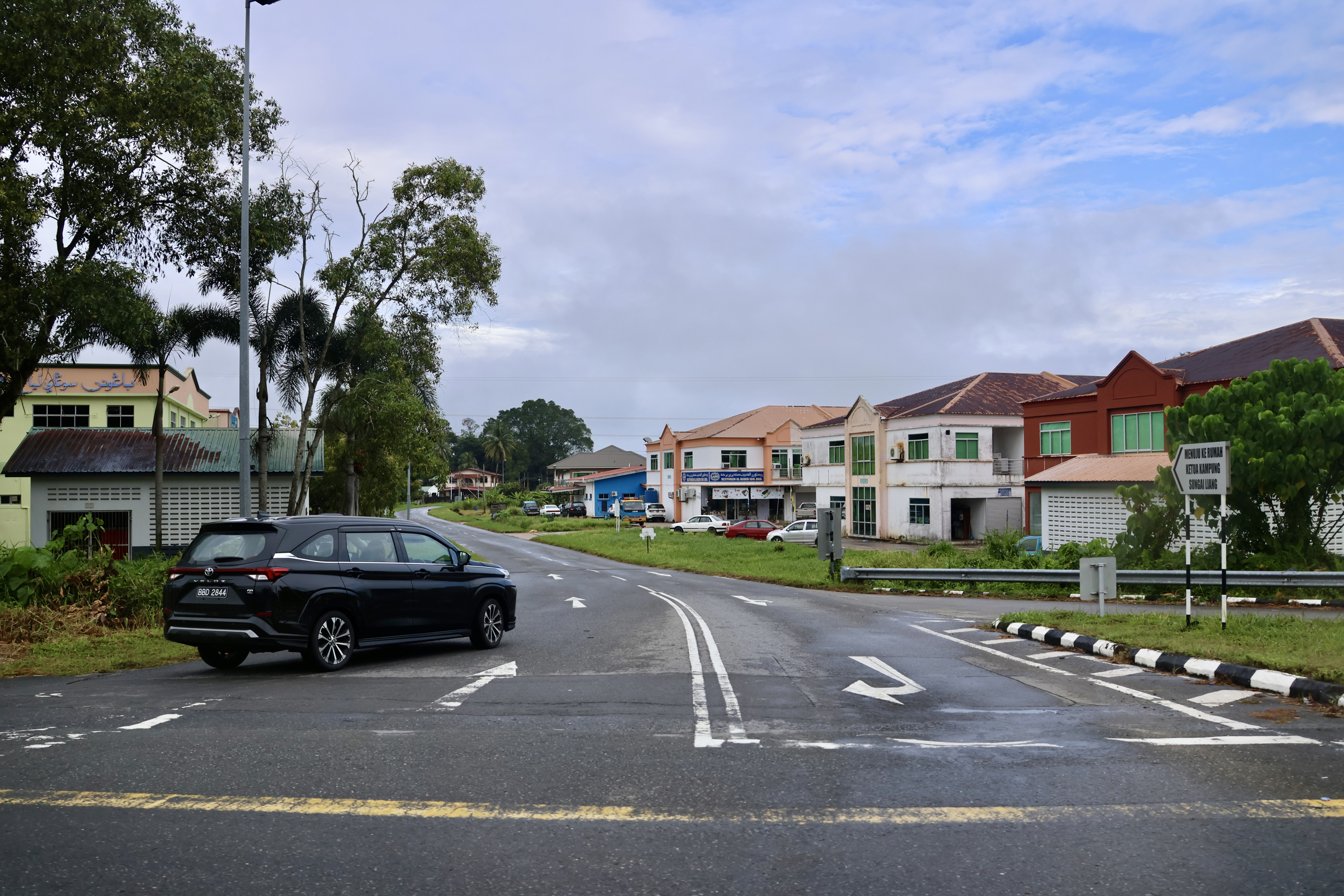
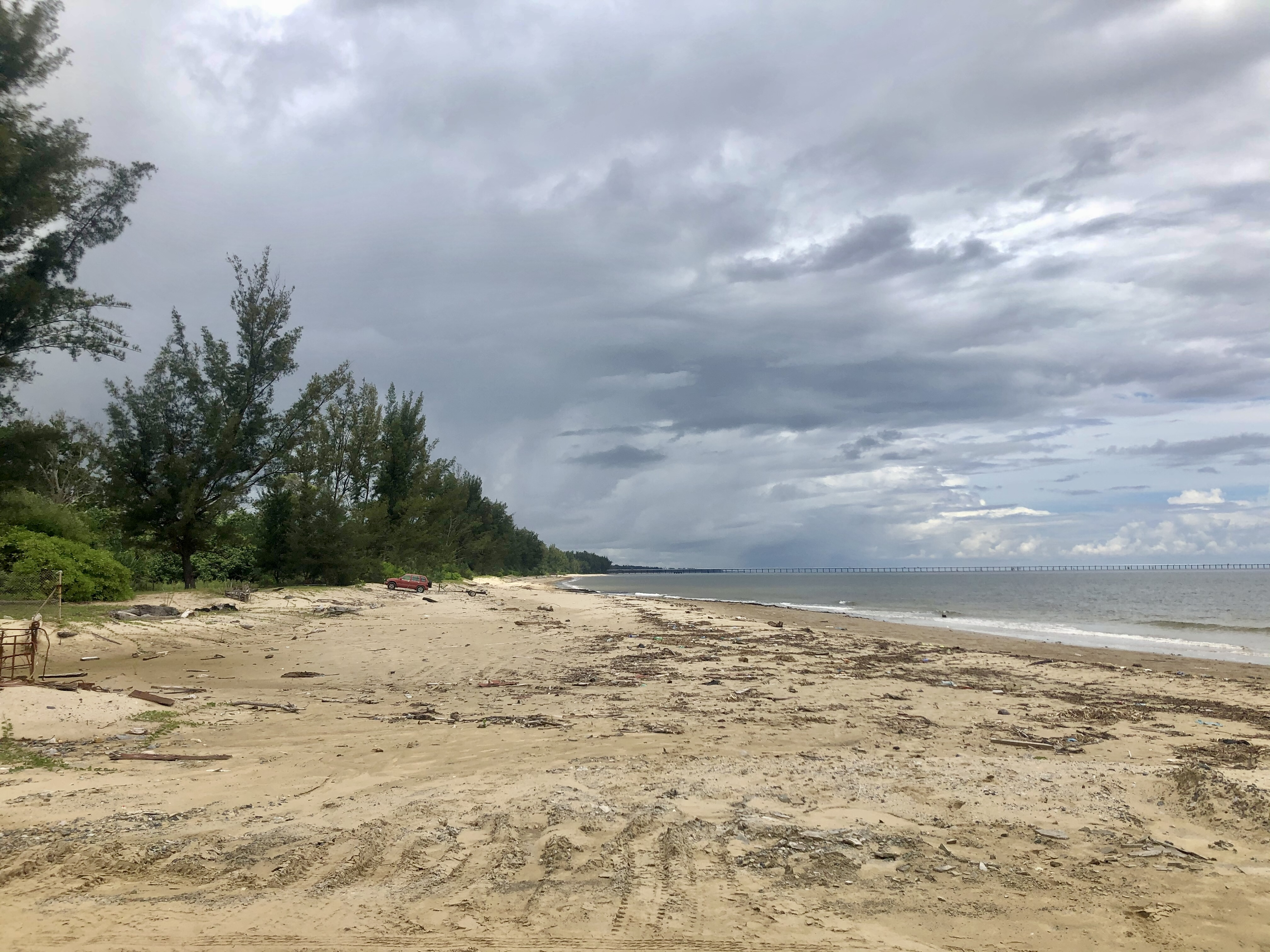
- Clockwise from top left: Kampong Sungai Liang Mosque, Sungai Liang Industrial Park, Sungai Liang Beach, Jalan Pantai Sungai Liang

- Location in Brunei
- Coordinates: 4°40′39″N 114°29′45″E
- Country: Brunei
- District: Belait
- Mukim: Liang

Government
  - Village head: Haszrin Bagol

Area
  - Total: 78.25 km^{2} (30.21 sq mi)

Population (2021)
  - Total: 641
  - Density: 8.19/km^{2} (21.2/sq mi)
- Time zone: UTC+8 (BNT)
- Postcode: KC1135

Kampong Sungai Liang (Malay: Kampung Sungai Liang) is a village located in Belait District, Brunei, approximately 40 kilometres (25 mi) from the district's main town, Kuala Belait, and 20 kilometres from the oil town of Seria. With a population of 641 in 2021, it is part of the Mukim Liang area and plays an important role in both agriculture and industry. The village is known for its agricultural contributions, including significant crop production and local handicrafts that have garnered international attention. Additionally, the village's industrial park is a key driver of Brunei's economic diversification, hosting major petrochemical and fertiliser companies that help reduce the country’s reliance on oil and gas.

== Etymology ==
The name Sungai Liang, or Bang Liang, originates from the Dusun people's dialect, where "Bang Liang" means "big hole." The term "bang" is derived from "bawang," meaning river. The name refers to the river that flows into a large chasm before emptying into the South China Sea.

== Geography ==
Kampong Sungai Liang is a coastal village along the South China Sea, with neighbouring settlements including Kampong Telisai in the Tutong District to the north-east and Lumut to the south-west. The village features a beach along its coastline, although it remains a non-commercial area despite the presence of huts. The river basin, where freshwater meets saltwater, is an important fishing spot, contributing to the village's local economy and providing resources for its residents.

== Administration ==
Kampong Sungai Liang, covering an area of 78.25 square kilometres (30.21 sq mi), is home to eight smaller villages: Kampong Keluyoh, Kampong Perumpong, Kampong Sungai Gana, Kampong Tunggulian, Kampong Andulau, Kampong Lilas, Kampong Padang, and Kampong Liang Kecil.

== Demography ==
As of 2018, a total of 3,469 individuals call Kampong Sungai Liang home, including Dusun, Kedayan, Malay, Chinese, Iban, among other tribes and ethnicities; there are 1,732 men and 1,737 women.

== Infrastructure ==
In addition to access to essential public facilities such as water, electricity, mosques, health clinics, primary and religious schools, private schools, fire stations, public halls, and waste disposal sites, residents of Kampong Sungai Liang also benefit from mobile phone and radio trunk signals. They receive social support through various programs, including Welfare Assistance, Old Age Pension, and assistance from the Department of Community Development. Furthermore, the village is home to resorts, providing a range of amenities to its residents and visitors alike.

=== Education ===
Numerous educational establishments that cater to the local population can be found in Sungai Liang. In addition to being the village's government primary school, Sungai Liang Primary School is also home to the Sungai Liang Religious School, which offers elementary-level Islamic religious instruction. In addition, Chung Lian School was founded in 1953 and formally opened in August 1955 by the Sungai Liang and Lumut community in response to the need for elementary education. Since its beginnings with just 27 students and a teacher who doubled as principal, Chung Lian School has made contributions to both child education and community assistance.

=== Government ===
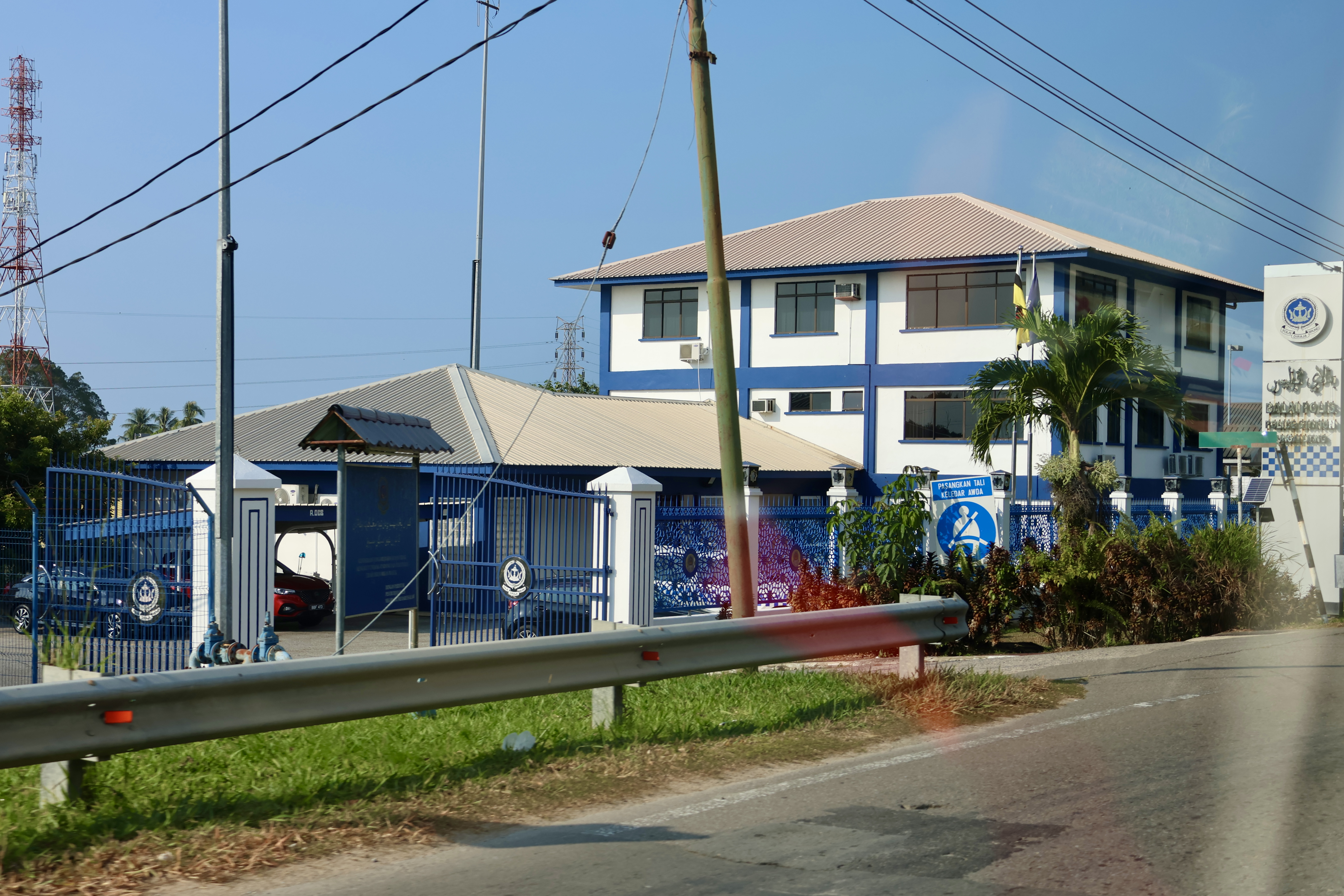
Sungai Liang Police Station in 2024

Sungai Liang is home to several important government facilities that serve the local community. The village hosts the Sungai Liang Health Centre, the only community health centre in Mukim Liang, and an emergency ambulance service to cater to medical needs. The Sungai Liang Police Station is the sole police station in the mukim, ensuring law enforcement and security. The Sungai Liang Fire Station, officially opened on 14 September 1990, is located in Kampong Lilas but is named after the village. It houses the Fire and Rescue Department's Operation Branch 'B'. Additionally, the Sungai Liang community hall serves as a venue for the election of the penghulu of Mukim Liang, further contributing to the village's civic and community activities.

=== Recreation ===
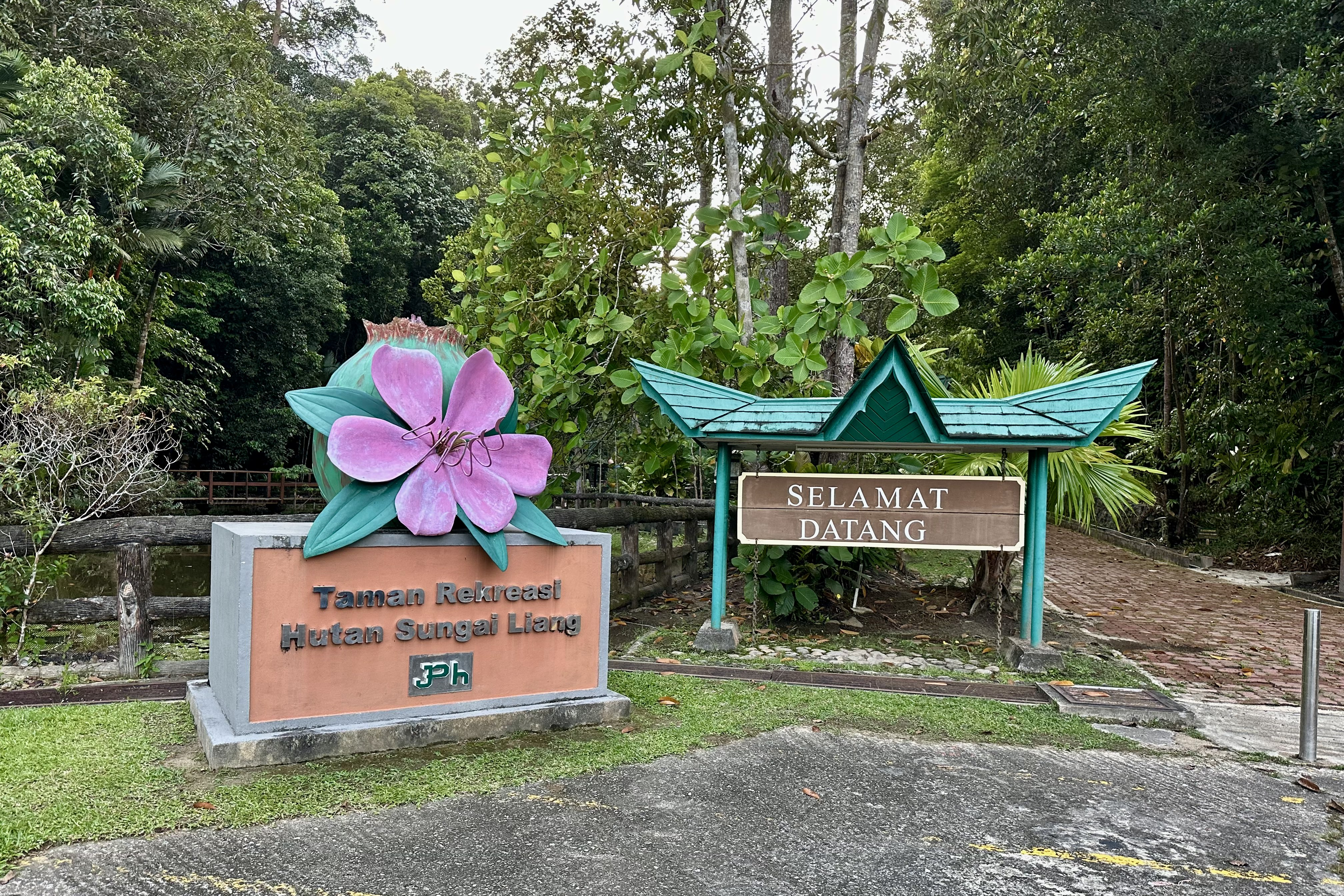
Main entrance of the Sungai Liang Forest Recreation Park in 2023

Sungai Liang Forest Recreation Park was established around 1948 and initially placed under the control of the Kuala Belait Forestry Department. In 1970, the park was opened to the public after being maintained and developed as a recreational area and research site. Previously known as the Arboretum Forest Reserve, the park is located along the road leading to Jalan Labi. Covering a total area of 66 hectares (160 acres), only 14 hectares are open to the public. The park was officially inaugurated on 21 March 1987 by Abdul Rahman Taib in conjunction with World Forestry Day celebrations. The park was subsequently renamed to its current name.

Brunei Forestry Museum is built in 1986. It is one of Brunei's earliest colonnaded structures. The museum was first built in the middle of 1985 out of wood with a thatched roof. The museum serves as the public's primary source of forestry knowledge and showcases the natural history of Brunei forestry, the riches of the country's woods, as well as vintage tools and traditional forest goods.

=== Religion ===
On behalf of Pengiran Anak Kemaluddin, the Director of Religious Affairs, Acting Chief Kadi Zain Serudin handed a B$4,000 contribution from Sultan Omar Ali Saifuddien III to help finish the Sungai Liang Mosque's construction. On 13 December 1966, the presentation event was held at the Sungai Liang community hall. The Brunei Islamic Religious Council, the Bruneian government, and public donations helped finance the construction of this mosque, which was finished in 1980. On Saturday, 8 November 1980, Pengiran Abdul Momin formally opened the mosque. The mosque was enlarged in 1989 at a cost of $269,533.03 due to the growing congregation and population. The mosque has a library as one of its amenities.

== Economy ==
=== Agriculture ===
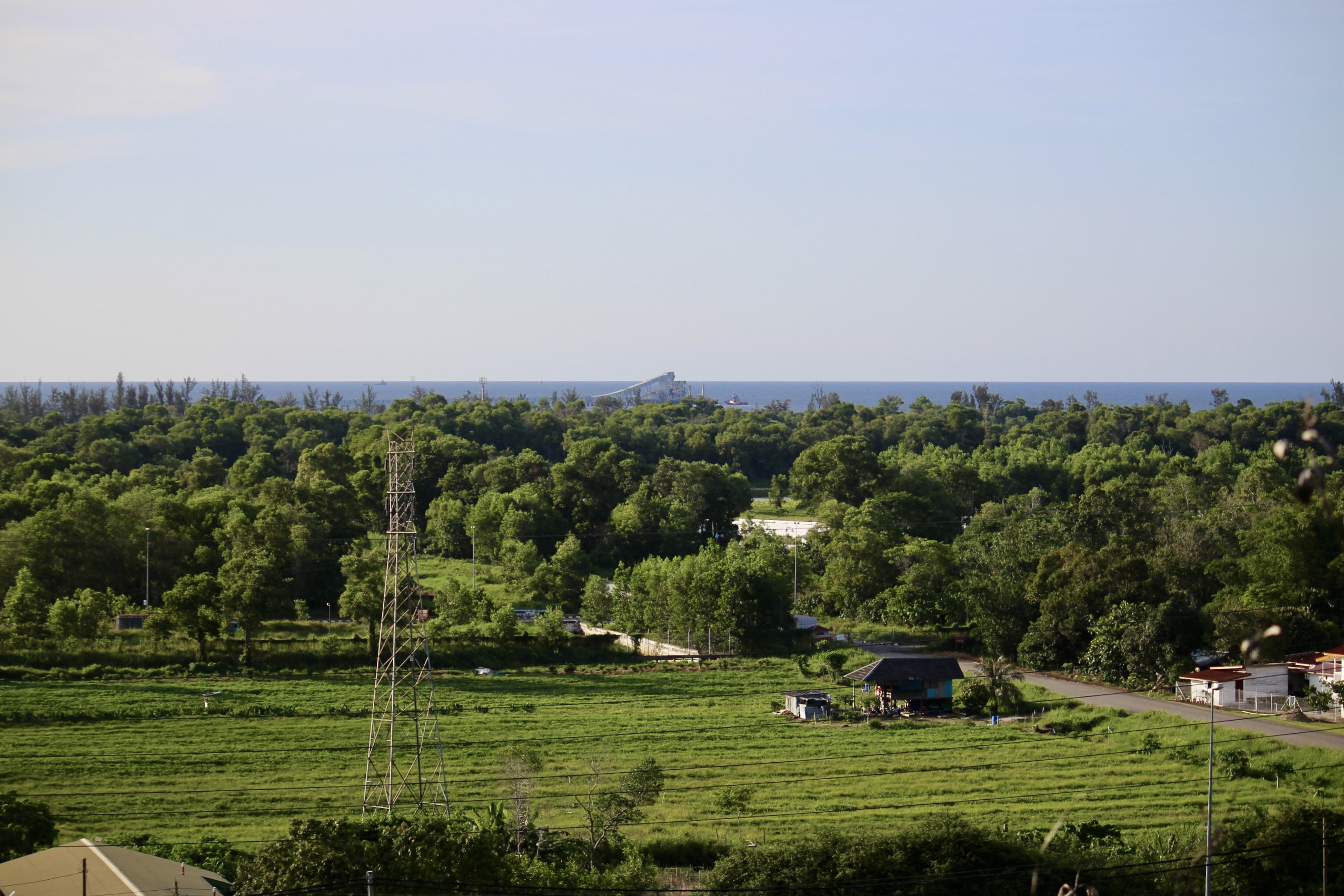
Plantations in Sungai Liang in 2022

Agriculture in Sungai Liang has seen significant development over the years, with various initiatives contributing to the sector's growth. The 1971 Sungai Liang Agricultural Station report highlighted the positive effects of lime on soil, which led to improved crop yields, including sweet peppers, beans, and brinjals. However, challenges like groundnut rust (Puccinia arachidis) and waterlogged fields were also noted, though the trials indicated that proper soil conditions could yield better results.

According to a 1987 study, 800 hectares (2,000 acres) of land were being created for fruit tree gardens and homegrown vegetable growing, Sungai Liang possesses potential for agricultural development. Along the beach road, this region is made up of two small land strips. The grey-white podzolic, podzol, and regosol soils have a sandy texture, yet they are enough for agriculture even though they are marginally better than those in certain other areas. The Sungai Liang region also engages in chicken farming in addition to crop agriculture.

More recently, AgroZid established a 2.5 hectare chilli farm in Sungai Liang, contributing to the region's agricultural landscape. Marsya Farm, founded in 2000, has been a model of agricultural innovation in the area. Spanning 2.808 hectares in the Agricultural Development Area, the farm grows a variety of crops such as sweet corn, cassava, cherry tomatoes, Taiwanese cucumbers, and leafy vegetables like spinach and mustard greens. Marsya Farm has reached impressive production milestones, including 126,300 kilograms (278,400 lb) of vegetables in 2020. The farm's produce is sold at the weekly Pasar Kitani and supplied to major supermarkets such as SupaSave and Soon Lee Megamart in Sungai Liang.

=== Handicrafts ===
The people of Kampung Sungai Liang are also skilled in producing their own goods, such as traditional foods (including confectionery) and handicrafts made from weaving. Notable items include takiding (woven baskets used for storing ornamental objects) and bamboo squirrels, which have garnered positive attention both locally and internationally. These handwoven products are showcased not only in Brunei Darussalam but also at international expos. Despite being crafted from simple natural materials, the items have received enthusiastic feedback and even orders from local handicraft enthusiasts, highlighting the community's creativity and craftsmanship.

=== Petrochemical and fertiliser ===
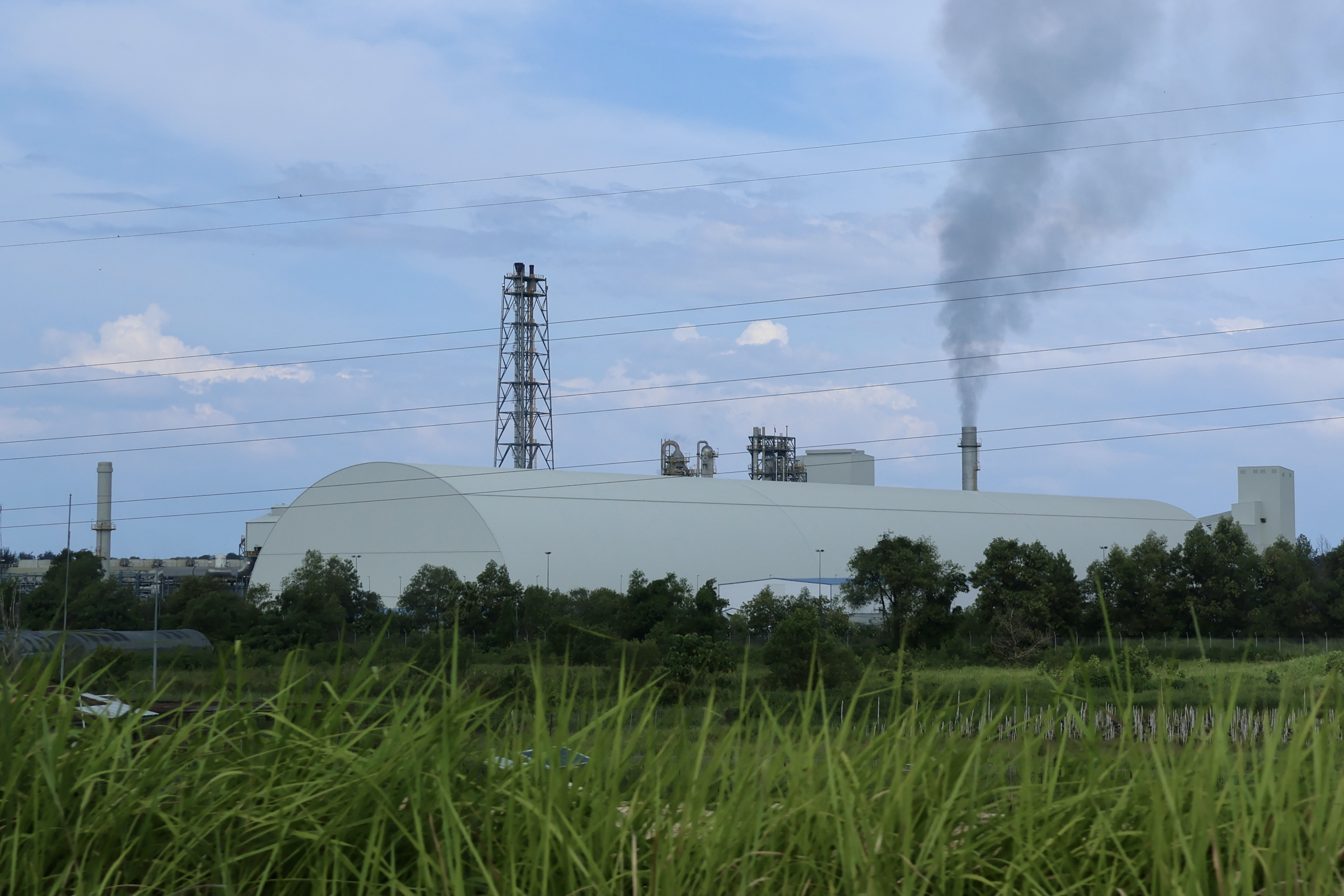
BFI plant within SPARK in 2023

With substantial contributions from both domestic and foreign stakeholders, Brunei's efforts to diversify its economy have been anchored by the Sungai Liang Industrial Park (SPARK). The first site preparation for the 271-hectare park was done by a local contractor, Galfar Pembinaan dan Perusahaan, who also installed permanent drainage, cleared the area, leveled it, and put up security fencing. The Sungai Liang Authority oversees SPARK, which promotes the growth of an internationally competitive industrial and petrochemical hub. The Brunei Methanol Company (BMC), SPARK's first major tenant, established a B$400 million methanol facility in Sungai Liang, marking the largest investment outside Brunei's oil, gas, and LNG industries. The plant, capable of producing up to 850,000 tonnes (840,000 long tons; 940,000 short tons) of methanol annually, aligns with Wawasan Brunei 2035's goals of diversifying the economy and reducing dependence on oil and gas.

In addition to the methanol facility, SPARK hosted the Brunei Fertilizer Industries (BFI), developed by a consortium comprising Westside Limited, Mitsubishi Corporation, and Australia's Incitec Pivot. The BFI plant is developed by ThyssenKrupp and expected to operate by 2021. The industrial park also included plans for a demonstration hydrogenation plant, under development by the Advanced Hydrogen Energy Chain Association for Technology Development (AHEAD), a Japanese consortium. Expected to be completed by 2019, the plant aimed to produce 210 tonnes of liquefied hydrogen sourced from the nearby Brunei LNG plant. The hydrogen was intended for export to Japan, with the first batch planned as fuel for 3,000 cars during the Tokyo Summer Olympic Games in 2020.

With a new factory scheduled for completion in 2027, Polygel Organometallic plans to extend its operations at SPARK. Chemical intermediates including acetic acid and aniline, which are essential for use in rubber, synthetic fibres, plastics, and pharmaceuticals, will be produced at this facility. The 30-acre facility would use feedstock from Brunei's major downstream oil and gas enterprises, Hengyi Industries, BFI, and BMC. It will employ more than seven times as many people as Polygel's current Salambigar operation.
