= Brunei Energy Services & Trading =

Petroleum exploration and development company in Brunei Darussalam

Brunei Energy Services & Trading Sdn Bhd
- Company type: State-owned enterprise
- Industry: Crude oil and natural gas
- Founded: 10 January 2012; 14 years ago
- Headquarters: Bandar Seri Begawan, BS8711, Brunei Darussalam
- Key people: Zety Sufina (Chairman and Director)
- Revenue: ▲ B$5.462 billion (2023)
- Owner: Government of Brunei
- Parent: Brunei Energy Holdings
- Website: BEST-Sdn-Bhd.com

PetroleumBRUNEI logo.

Brunei Energy Services & Trading Sdn Bhd (BEST) is a company based in Bandar Seri Begawan, Brunei Darussalam. Established in 2012 as PB Trading Sdn Bhd, it was previously a subsidiary of Brunei National Petroleum Company Sendirian Berhad, also known as PetroleumBRUNEI. Following a restructure of PetroleumBRUNEI and its subsidiaries, the regulatory authority is now known as Petroleum Authority (under the Department of Energy, Prime Minister's Office), whilst the trading and services arm of PetroleumBRUNEI (PB Trading Sdn Bhd) was renamed as BEST, and is now under the purview of the Ministry of Finance and Economy. BEST also provides the manpower and resources to its sister companies, Brunei Energy Exploration Sdn Bhd (BEE, previously known as PB ExPro Sdn Bhd) and Brunei Energy Production Sdn Bhd (BEP).

== Corporate history ==
Petroleum was discovered off the coast of Brunei in the 1950s. After Brunei became independence from the United Kingdom in 1984, like other established companies operating in Brunei at that time, it nationalised all onshore and offshore mineral rights. The new nation had little petroleum exploration, development, or production capacity of its own. Instead, the government continued its long-standing practice of contracting the British to lease petroleum rights to foreign companies. Under the new regime, these companies in turn granted the government a percentage interest in any crude oil or natural gas discovered. PetroleumBRUNEI was created to help build domestic upstream, midstream, and downstream capacity.

Offshore exploration and development in Brunei waters largely ceased in 2003 after Malaysia disputed the exact maritime boundaries between the two nations. In March 2009, the two nations signed agreements which defined these boundaries, and which allocated profits from oil and gas development to each nation on a percentage basis, when the oilfield lay in a cross-boundary area. Joint development of offshore petroleum resources began again. By 2013, Brunei was the fourth-largest oil exporter in south-east Asia. It exported about 160,000 barrels of oil per day.

In October 2013, China National Offshore Oil Corporation and PetroleumBRUNEI established a joint venture to provide oilfield services. Brunei, which was the world's ninth-largest liquified natural gas (LNG) exporter in 2013, also created a joint venture with the Malaysian oil company, Petronas, to build a natural gas liquification plant in British Columbia, Canada. The move would give PetroleumBRUNEI new and additional expertise in the LNG industry.

PetroleumBRUNEI received its first lease to explore and develop petroleum right in a foreign nation in 2014, when it won an auction for onshore rights in an area of Myanmar. The project there would be jointly developed with Myanma Oil and Gas Enterprise.

The 2009 maritime boundary agreement led to talks which did not reach a conclusion until 2019. A change in the Malaysian government led to new leadership dissatisfied with the percentage of profits received by Malaysia from the newly created Commercial Arrangement Area. These and other disputes were apparently resolved in June 2019, and PetroleumBRUNEI and Petronas agreed to accelerate development of large new natural gas resources discovered in the Kelidang gas field. Petronas cancelled the joint development operation in March 2020.

PetroleumBRUNEI had originally been given responsibility for both petroleum industry development and regulation. However, in April 2020, regulatory authority was taken from the corporation and given to the new Petroleum Authority Brunei Darussalam.
