= Mitsubishi Gas Chemical Company =

Japanese company

Mitsubishi Gas Chemical Company, Inc.
- Native name: 三菱瓦斯化学株式会社
- Industry: Chemicals
- Founded: 1918; 108 years ago
- Headquarters: Japan
- Area served: worldwide
- Website: www.mgc.co.jp

Mitsubishi Gas Chemical Company, Inc. (三菱ガス化学, Mitsubishi Gasu Kagaku, MGC) (TYO: 4182) is a Japanese company.

== History ==
The company was established in 1918 and incorporated in 1951.

== Divisions ==
The company operates five business segments, four producing different types of chemical products. These divisions are natural gas-related chemicals, aromatic-related chemicals, functional chemicals, specialty functional materials and a real estate business. As of March 31, 2012, the Company had 91 subsidiaries and 41 associated companies. The company has a Research and Development Organization. The company organization has a research and development department for each plant that contributes to creating newer and better products by enhancing the quality of current products and technologies.
