= Wawasan Brunei 2035 =

Governmental development plan in Brunei

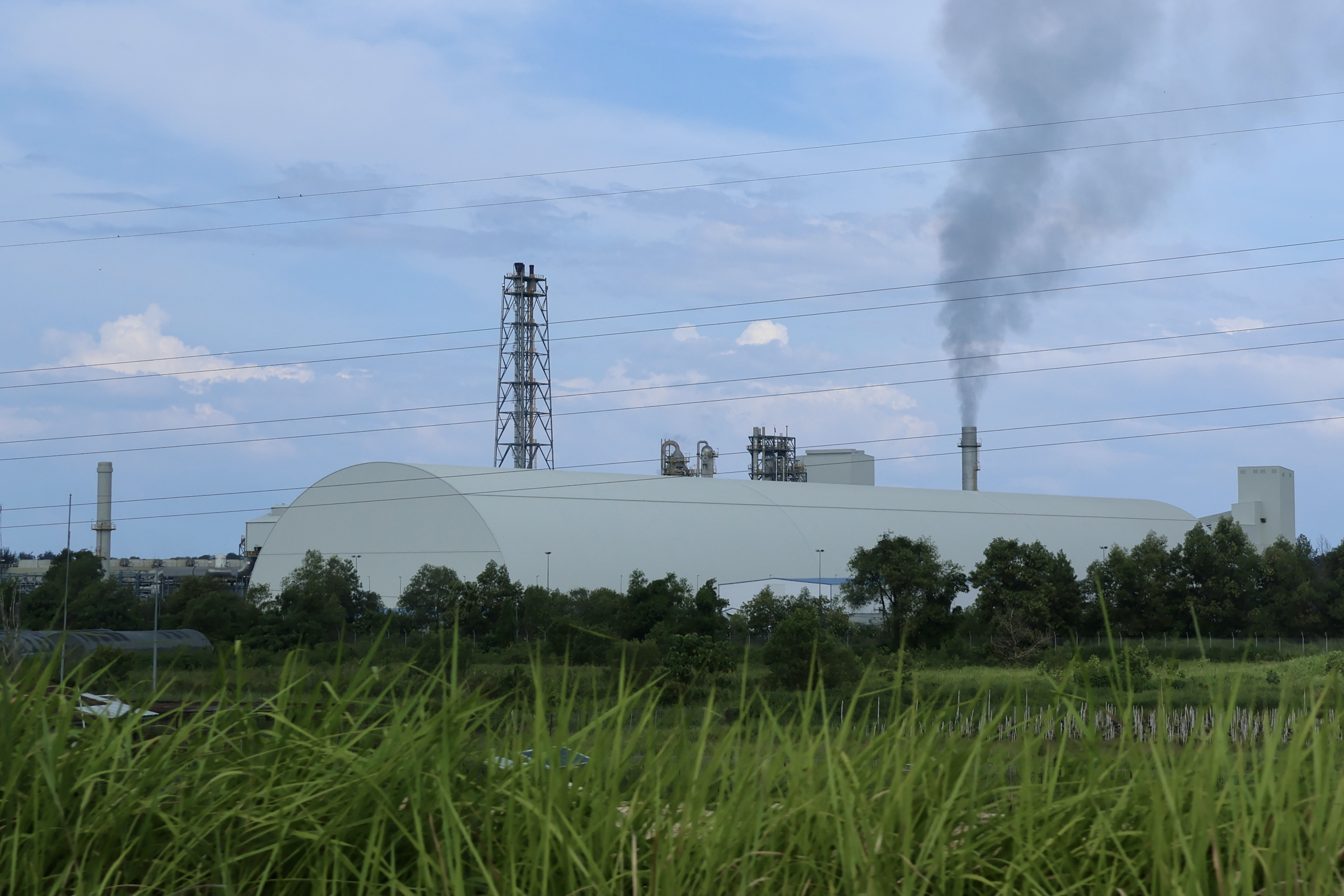
An ammonia and urea plant contribute to raising the level of expertise of local employees in keeping with Brunei Vision 2035's goals.

Through its five-year National Development Plans, Sultan Hassanal Bolkiah's administration actively promotes the development of a number of key sectors in an effort to spur economic growth. These describe the allocation of government funds and the budget designated for national development in several fields. As the first national development plan to be created in accordance with the goals of Brunei's recently unveiled long-term development plan, better known as Wawasan Brunei 2035 (English: Brunei Vision 2035), the current 9th National Development Plan (2007–2012) represents a strategic shift in the planning and execution of development projects. Given that Brunei's oil supplies are expected to run out in the near future, Wawasan directly confronts the issue of the country's dependence on gas.

== Governance structure ==
=== Supreme Council ===
The Sultan emphasized the significance of tracking the country's progress toward the Wawasan Brunei 2035 in 2014 and ordered the establishment of the Majlis Tertinggi Wawasan Brunei 2035 (MTWB; Wawasan Brunei 2035 Supreme Council). The council's primary responsibility is to offer systematic and comprehensive assistance for government agencies as they undertake measures to realize the goals of Wawasan Brunei 2035. As the Lead Agency, MTWB's responsibility is to guarantee that the whole of government approach is used to more effectively and continuously coordinate the national development agenda at the highest level. This is accomplished through establishing a direction, a policy, and comprehensive monitoring. At that time, Crown Prince Al-Muhtadee Billah served as the MTWB's chairman. The Secretary is the Permanent secretary in the Prime Minister's Office, and the members include all Cabinet Ministers and some Deputy Ministers. Members are in charge of coming up with strategic objectives, creating action plans, and carrying them out to realize Brunei Vision 2035.

=== Permanent Secretariat ===
When it was first established in 2015, the Permanent Secretariat of Brunei Vision 2035 served solely as the secretariat for the Supreme Council of Brunei Vision 2035. In addition to serving as the MTWB secretariat, the secretariat is in charge of overseeing the ministries' initiatives and strategies that contribute to the realization of Brunei Vision 2035. Additionally, the Secretariat is responsible for informing all facets of Brunei society about the most recent advancements in the Brunei Vision 2035. The Brunei Vision Office will take the place of the Permanent Secretariat of Brunei Vision 2035 in 2020.

=== Framework ===
The Brunei Vision 2035 Framework was introduced in 2016 and is being used to help the Supreme Council of Brunei Vision 2035 manage and oversee the country's development agenda in a more methodical and focused manner. The Brunei Vision 2035 Framework offers direction for carrying out initiatives to realize the Brunei Vision 2035 as well as for setting up a system for tracking, assessing, and reporting outcomes based on achievement results. The Framework also serves as a guide to make sure that activities generated at the ministry or implementation agency level are in accordance with the results that are anticipated to be achieved. Through achievement results, key areas to be accomplished, and key performance indicators (Key performance indicators, KPI) through targets and trajectories set to measure the country's performance for each achievement, the Brunei Vision 2035 Framework outlines the main focus of development efforts at the national level to realize Brunei Vision 2035.

== Overview ==
=== Establishment ===
In 2004, the Sultan approved the creation of a Council for Long-Term development Planning, which was entrusted with developing a future vision for Brunei and outlining the technical, financial, and strategic conditions necessary for realizing it. The Council for Long-Term development Planning identified the collective aspirations of Brunei as the preservation of social, cultural, spiritual, and historic values; assisting people in successfully navigating the practical challenges of modern life; and fostering a sense of security for families and communities.

These suggestions, which were made public in 2007, with the launch of Wawasan Brunei 2035, incorporated a vision for the future that may satisfy peoples' long-term aspirations and expectations.

According to the vision, by 2035, Brunei hopes to be known for its educated, highly skilled workforce that meets the highest international standards, its high standard of living that ranks among the top 10 nations in the world, and its dynamic, sustainable economy with a Gross domestic product (GDP) that ranks among the top 10 nations worldwide. In conjunction to the 2009 new year titah, the Sultan's excerpt is as stated:

While we do not know the answers to the world's complex challenges, we need to prepare for the future. God willing, our government will always make appropriate assessments and repairs. We are not alone from facing various new challenges that no one can expect. But in line with our beliefs, we strive, in addition to praying and trusting, with full of courage. All this, in the end, will create national resilience, which plays n essential role in guaranteeing the progress and prosperity of this country. That is why we have planned a reasonable Brunei Vision as a legacy of the nation's existence. Wawasan has charted the country's future direction, guiding a more systematic plan to lead to a country that has highly educated and skilled yet successful, quality citizens and has a dynamic yet resilient economy.

— Kebawah Duli Yang Maha Mulia Paduka Seri Baginda Sultan Haji Hassanal Bolkiah Mu'izzaddin Waddaulah, Wawasan Brunei 2035

The Wawasan Brunei 2035 Report was released by the Wawasan Brunei 2035 Supreme Council. The report, which is currently accessible on the websites of the Prime Minister's Office and Wawasan Brunei 2035, details the accomplishment of efforts made in support of Brunei Vision 2035 from 2015 to 2022 as well as the progress of their implementation. As of 2013, the use of specialist clusters from Wawasan Brunei 2035 such as the industrial sector is diversifying. As with housing, roads, and utilities, industrial estates are seen as essential components of Brunei's national infrastructure.

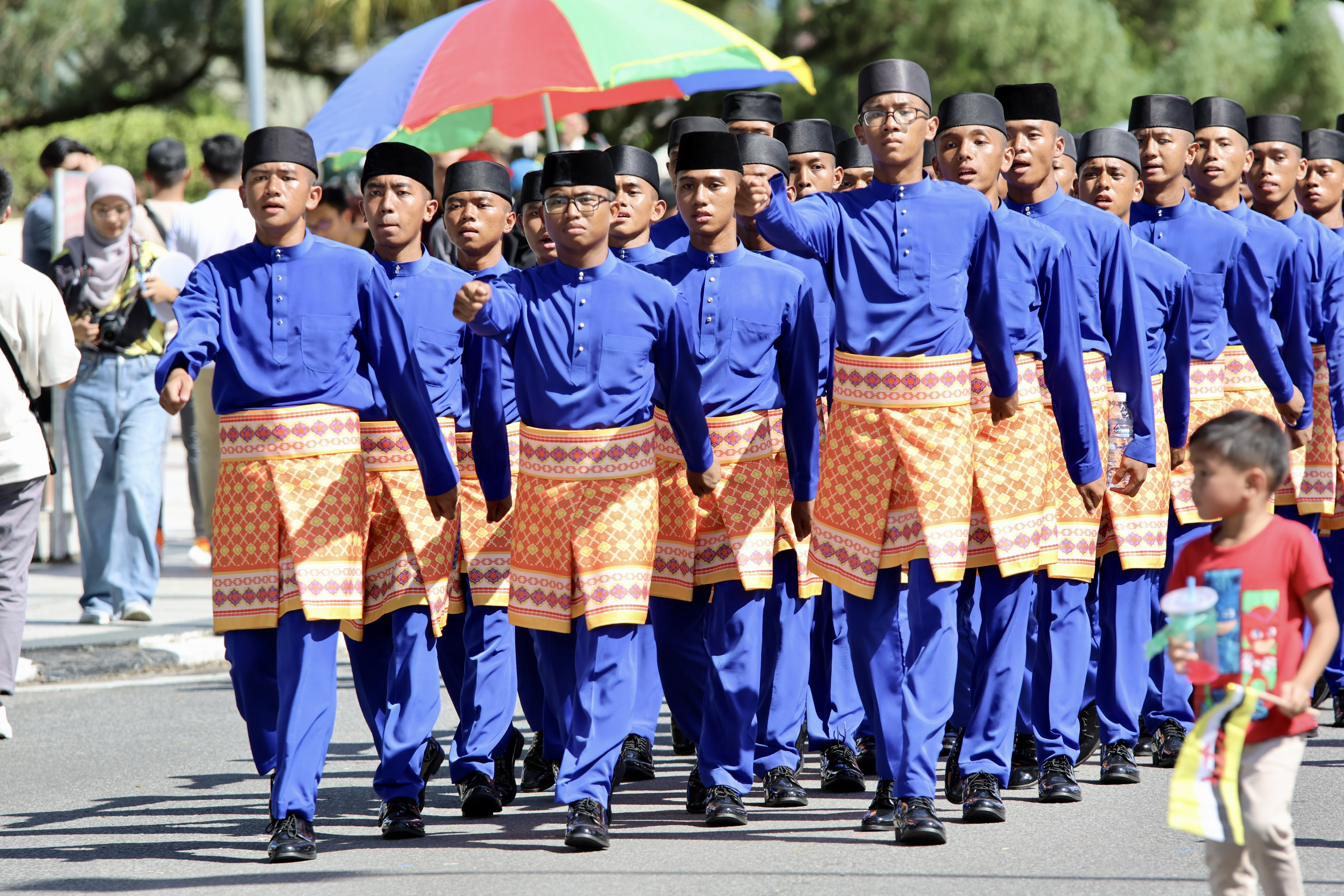
Youth is advised to be prepared to drive and take the lead in the growth of the nation.

=== Aims ===
Wawasan Brunei 2035, often known as Brunei Vision 2035, seeks to make Brunei known for:

- Achievements of its highly educated and competent population as determined by the highest international standard.
- A standard of living that ranks in the top 10 in the world.
- A dynamic and sustainable economy with a high income per capita compared to other nations.

=== Strategies ===
Education, economics, security, institutional governance, local business growth that focuses on SMEs, infrastructure, social security, and government are the main emphasis areas of Wawasan Brunei 2035. The following eight strategies have been identified to achieve the aforementioned objectives:

- A plan for education that would equip young people for success and jobs in an increasingly knowledge-based and competitive society.
- An economic plan that would increase business prospects in Brunei and provide new jobs for the population by fostering both local and international investment in downstream sectors and other economic clusters outside the oil and gas sector.
- A security plan that integrates Brunei's military and diplomatic might with its ability to counter threats from illness and natural disasters to protect the country's political stability and sovereignty.
- A plan for institutional development that would improve excellent governance in the public and commercial sectors, high-quality public services, contemporary and practical legal and regulatory frameworks, and effective governmental processes with the least amount of bureaucratic "red tape."
- A local business development strategy that will increase chances for small and medium-sized businesses (SMEs) in the area and provide Bruneian Malays the chance to become industry leaders by enhancing their level of competitiveness.
- A plan for building and sustaining top-notch infrastructure that would guarantee ongoing government spending and public-private sector collaboration, with a focus on the sectors of industry, education, and health.
- A social security plan that makes sure all citizens are appropriately looked for as the country prospers.
- A plan for protecting the environment that assures the preservation of our ecosystem and cultural habitat. It will offer health and safety in accordance with the best global standards.

== See also ==
- Economy of Brunei
- Health in Brunei
- Melayu Islam Beraja
- Oil and natural gas in Brunei
