= Brunei Fertilizer Industries =

Fertilizer company in Brunei

Coordinates: 4.6759529°N 114.4837075°E

Brunei Fertilizer Industries Sdn Bhd (BFI)
- Official logo of BFI
- Company type: Government-linked company (SOE)
- Industry: Fertilizer
- Founded: October 28, 2013
- Headquarters: Level 2, SPARK Centre, Sungai Liang Industrial Park, Belait District, Brunei
- Area served: Worldwide
- Key people: Dr. Harri Kiiski (CEO); Hajah Nur Raihan DP Haji Mohd Rosli (Acting Deputy CEO); Satyajit Mahapatra (SVP Operations); Marjory Toidy (SVP Corporate Support); Yasser Mohamed Abd El-Motay Hamed (SVP Technical); Pg Ibrahim bin Pg Hj Abu Bakar (SVP HSSE)
- Products: Urea, Ammonia
- Revenue: ▲US$397 million (2024 est.)
- Owner: Government of Brunei (via Ministry of Finance and Economy)
- Number of employees: 500+
- Website: bfi.com.bn

The Brunei Fertilizer Industries (BFI) is a government owned company and producer of ammonia and urea granular fertilizer, located in Sungai Liang Industrial Park (SPARK), Belait District, Brunei. It is claimed to be one of the largest fertilizer facilities in Southeast Asia, and has a production capacity of 1,365,000 tonnes (1,343,000 long tons; 1,505,000 short tons) of urea annually. The facility for BFI started being built in May 2018 and 500 jobs were expected be created when the plant was fully operating.

The PMB Refinery and Petrochemical Plant at Pulau Muara Besar and the BFI Plant are Brunei's two major downstream oil and gas developments. The plant is divided into three sections: onsite utilities, ammonia plants, and urea plants. The export of the goods will go to the local agricultural sector.

== Production ==
With 1.29 million tonnes per annum (mtpa), urea has the largest capacity share, accounting for 63.9% of the complex's total annual capacity. Ammonia comes in second with 36.1%. (0.73mtpa). Future projects, such as the Brunei Fertilizer Industries Brunei Urea Plant and the Brunei Fertilizer Industries Brunei Ammonia Plant, are expected to increase the complex's capacity (1.29mtpa). The facility, which has a nameplate capacity of 3900mt per day.

As of February 2019, the 500 No. of steel pipe piles for the Urea Export Jetty must be driven in record time while conforming to the requirements of the oil and gas safety standards due to the high demands of a fast-tracked project and the tight deadline. The fully integrated fertiliser plant in Sungai Liang will produce 3,900 tons of urea and 2,200 tons of ammonia per day once it is finished in 2021, helping to meet the growing global demand for food crops.

== History ==
The company, which is majority owned by the Government of Brunei, was founded on 28 October 2013, as part of the nation's growth of downstream businesses in the oil and gas industry. On 26 August 2017, a B$1.8 billon contract for the Engineering, procurement, and construction (EPC) of a new fertilizer manufacturing plant was signed between BFI and ThyssenKrupp; it is anticipated to take effect later this year. The Memorandum of understanding (MoU) was signed between BFI and ThyssenKrupp Industrial Solutions in presence of Minister of Finance II, Abdul Rahman Ibrahim. According to Doosan Heavy Industries Vietnam, a new project including the fabrication and supply of more than 1,500 tons of steel structure for the BFI facility was inked in March 2019 between Doosan Vina and Thyssenkrupp.

The final piece of heavy equipment for the Brunei Fertilizer Industries was delivered by Jasra Logistics on 18 February 2020. The facility is 98.6% complete as of April 2021. BFI and Muara Port Company (MPC) inked a contract on 6 September 2021 that would enable the fertilizer producer to export granular urea through the largest marine port in the nation. The operator of Muara Port, MPC, is best equipped to handle the fertilizer shipments, according to BFI, which plans to export granular urea to far-off markets including India, Australia, Latin America, and the United States.

The company' new urea melt facility was successfully started up and is the biggest Stamicarbon has ever permitted. On 16 January 2022, the first granules were discharged from the manufacturing line with assistance from Stamicarbon Process Engineers. On 23 January, BFI successfully completed its construction and produced its first commercial batch of urea in compliance with market requirements. To progressively raise output to reach its nameplate capacity of 3,900 tonnes, the firm is now recording production volumes that surpass 3,000 tonnes per day. The first two granular urea cargoes, each containing 6,000–7,000t, have been sold by BFI for delivery to South Korea and Thailand in February.

== Urea Export Jetty ==
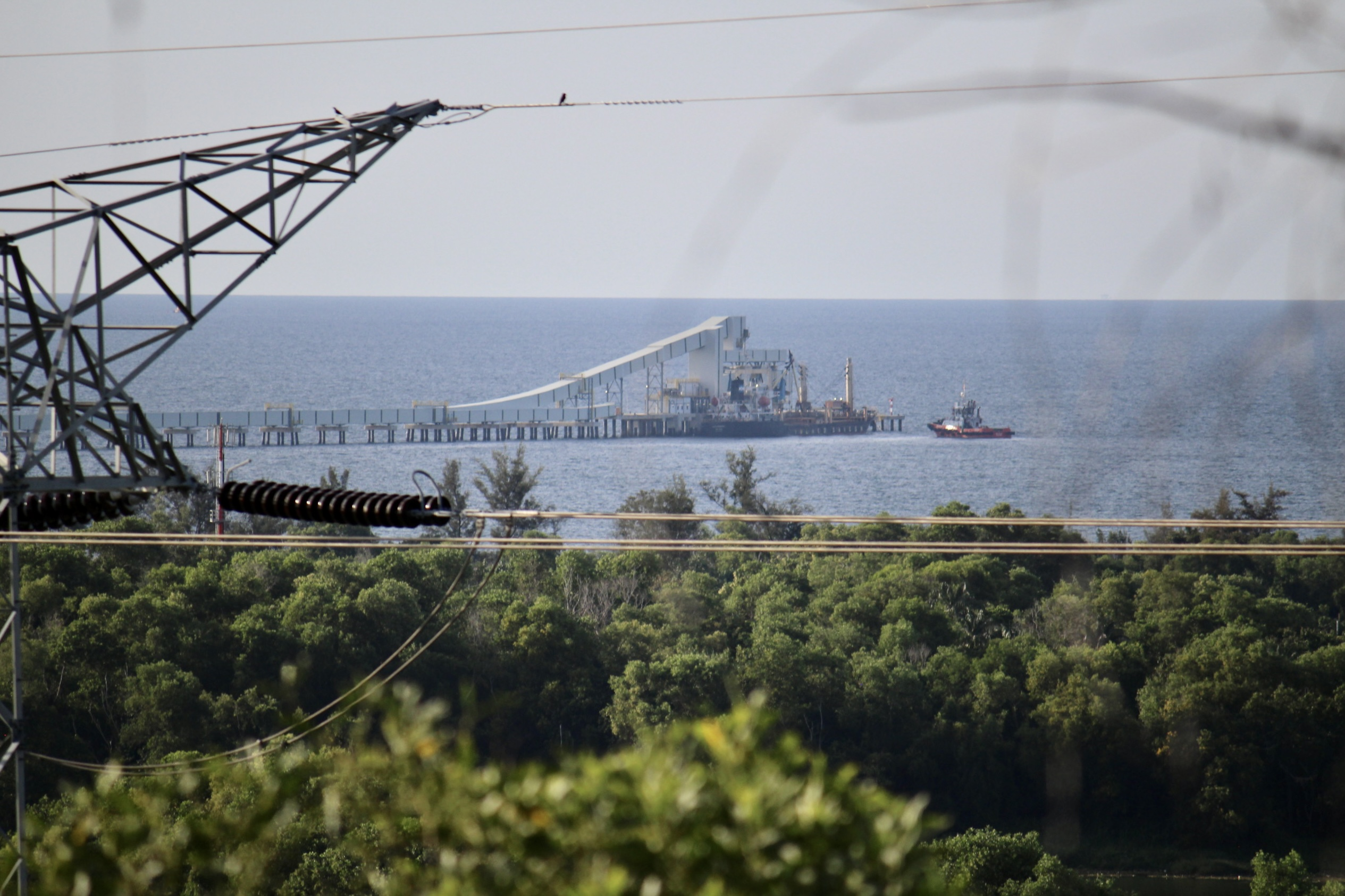
Urea Export Jetty in 2022

In a statement released today, the Maritime and Port Authority of Brunei Darussalam (MPABD) reminded mariners that the Urea Export Jetty project has been postponed till 20 October 2020. According to them, BFI carried out the construction work on 14 June might pose a navigation hazard. Moreover, the jetty facility has a total length of about 3.3 kilometres (2.1 mi), of which around 2.5 km are regarded to be offshore and 0.8 km are considered to be onshore. The mobility of ships and barges were constrained, therefore yellow marker buoys were placed in the impacted region.
