= Legislative Council of Brunei =

Unicameral legislature of Brunei

Coordinates: 04°54′48″N 114°56′55″E

Legislative Council of Brunei Majlis Mesyuarat Negara Brunei مجليس مشوارت نڬارا بروني
- 22nd Session
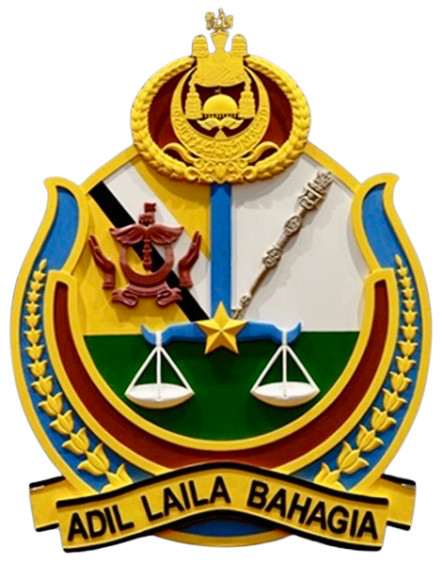
- Emblem of the Legislative Council

Type
- Type: Unicameral

History
- Established: 18 October 1959
- Preceded by: State Council
- New session started: 12 March 2025

Leadership
- Speaker: Abdul Rahman Taib, Independent since 11 February 2015
- Prime Minister: Hassanal Bolkiah since 1 January 1984
- Clerk to the Council: Huraini Hurairah since 9 January 2024

Structure
- Seats: 34
- Political groups: Government (14): Ex-officio (14); Appointed (20): Non-partisan (20)
- Length of term: 5 years

Elections
- Voting system: Appointment by the Sultan
- First election: 20 March 1965
- Last election: 20 January 2023

Meeting place
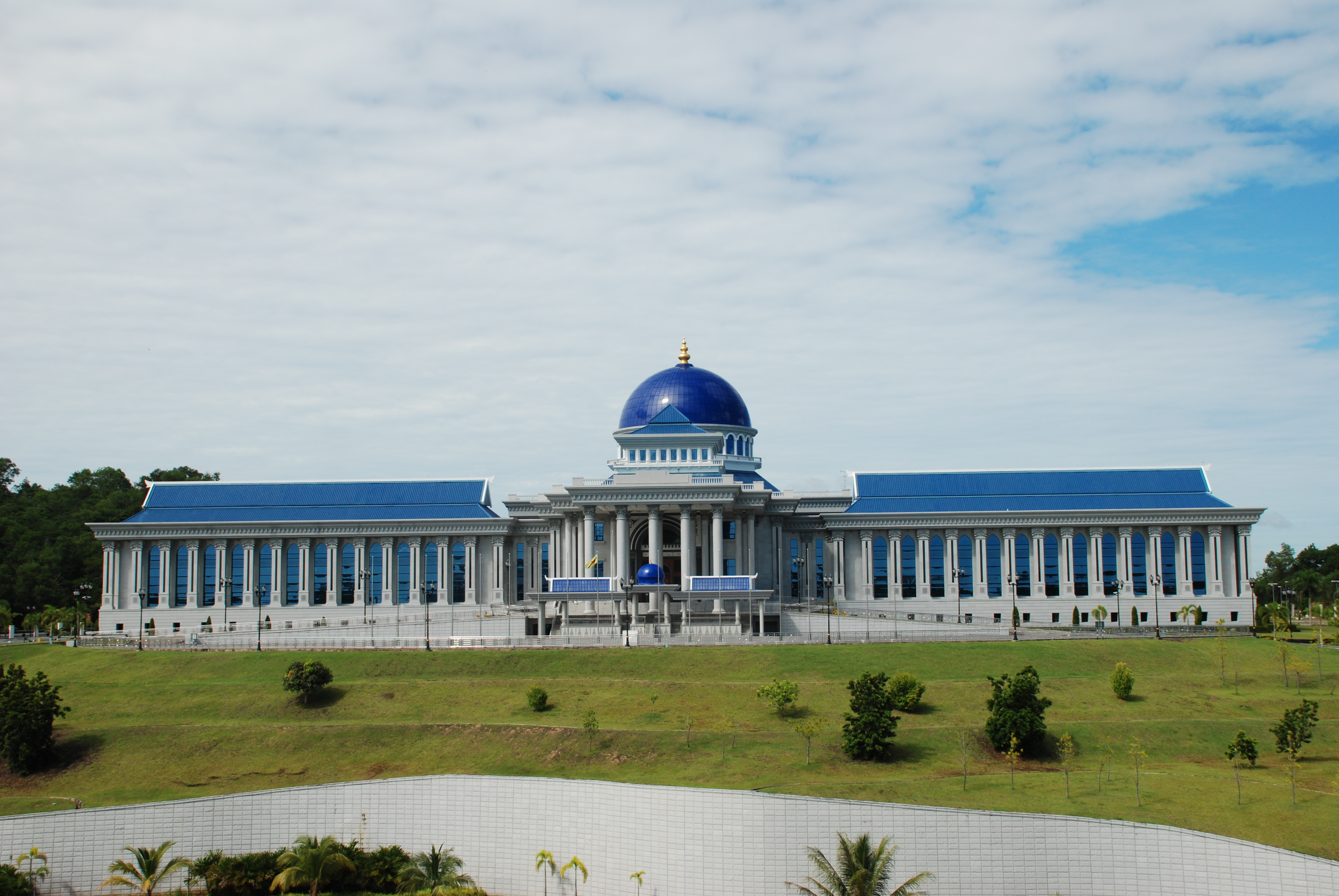
- Legislative Council Building; Bandar Seri Begawan, Brunei–Muara District; Brunei Darussalam

Website
- Legislative Council of Brunei

Constitution
- Constitution of Brunei

Rules
- Standing Orders of the Legislative Council (Malay)

The Legislative Council of Brunei (Malay: Majlis Mesyuarat Negara Brunei; Jawi: مجليس مشوارت نڬارا بروني; abbrev: LegCo) is the unicameral legislature of Brunei. As of the most recent composition, the Council consists of 34 members, including cabinet ministers who serve ex officio, all of whom are appointed by the Sultan. The Sultan of Brunei, who also serves as Prime Minister, holds full executive authority under the Constitution of 1959, which grants him extensive powers, including emergency authority first invoked in 1962.

The Council convenes annually, typically in March, at its building in Bandar Seri Begawan. Proceedings are presided over by the Speaker of the Council, who is also appointed by the Sultan. While the Council's role is largely consultative, it participates in legislative processes including the review of national budgets, the introduction and passage of bills, and the discussion of government policy.

== History ==
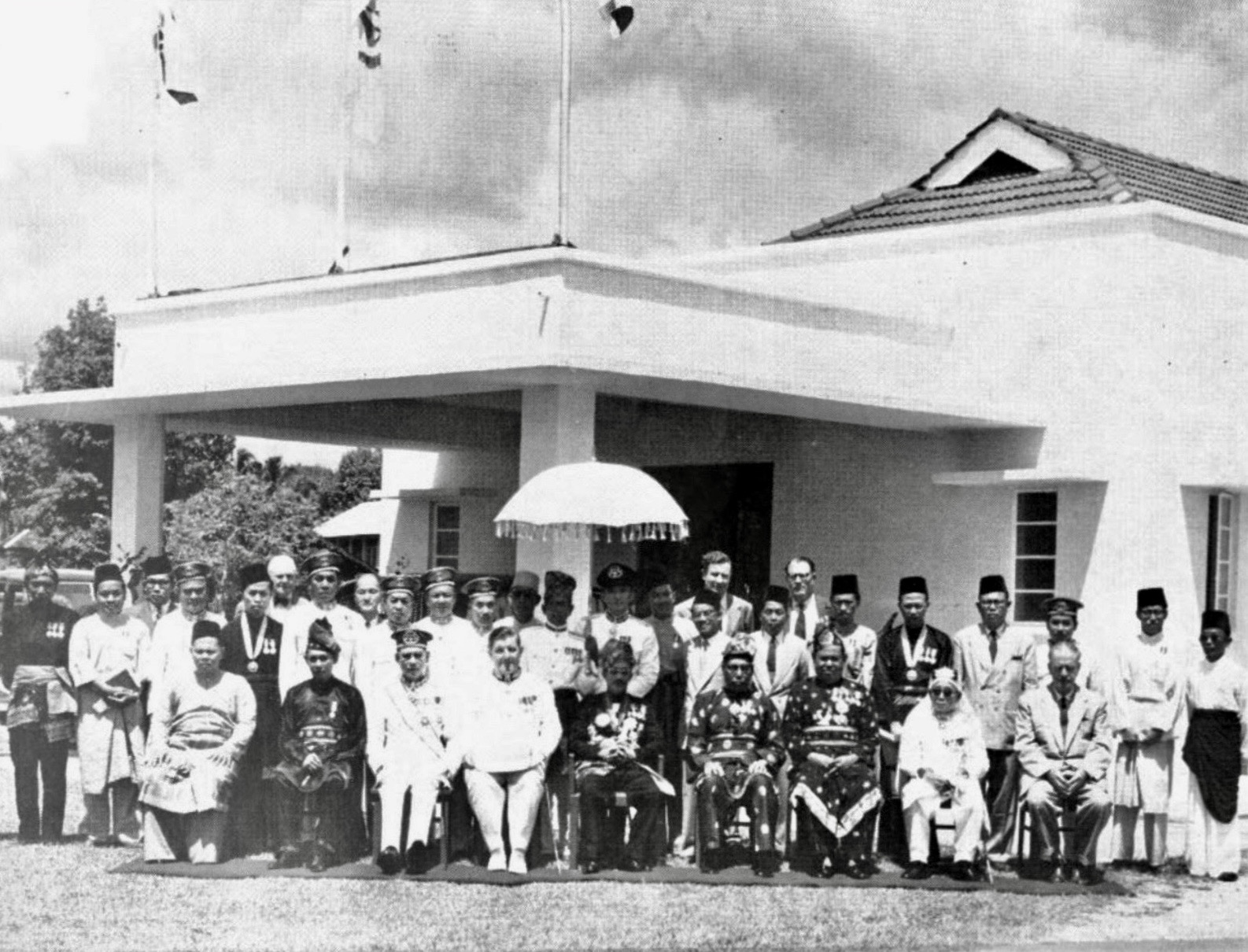
1959 Legislative Council of Brunei

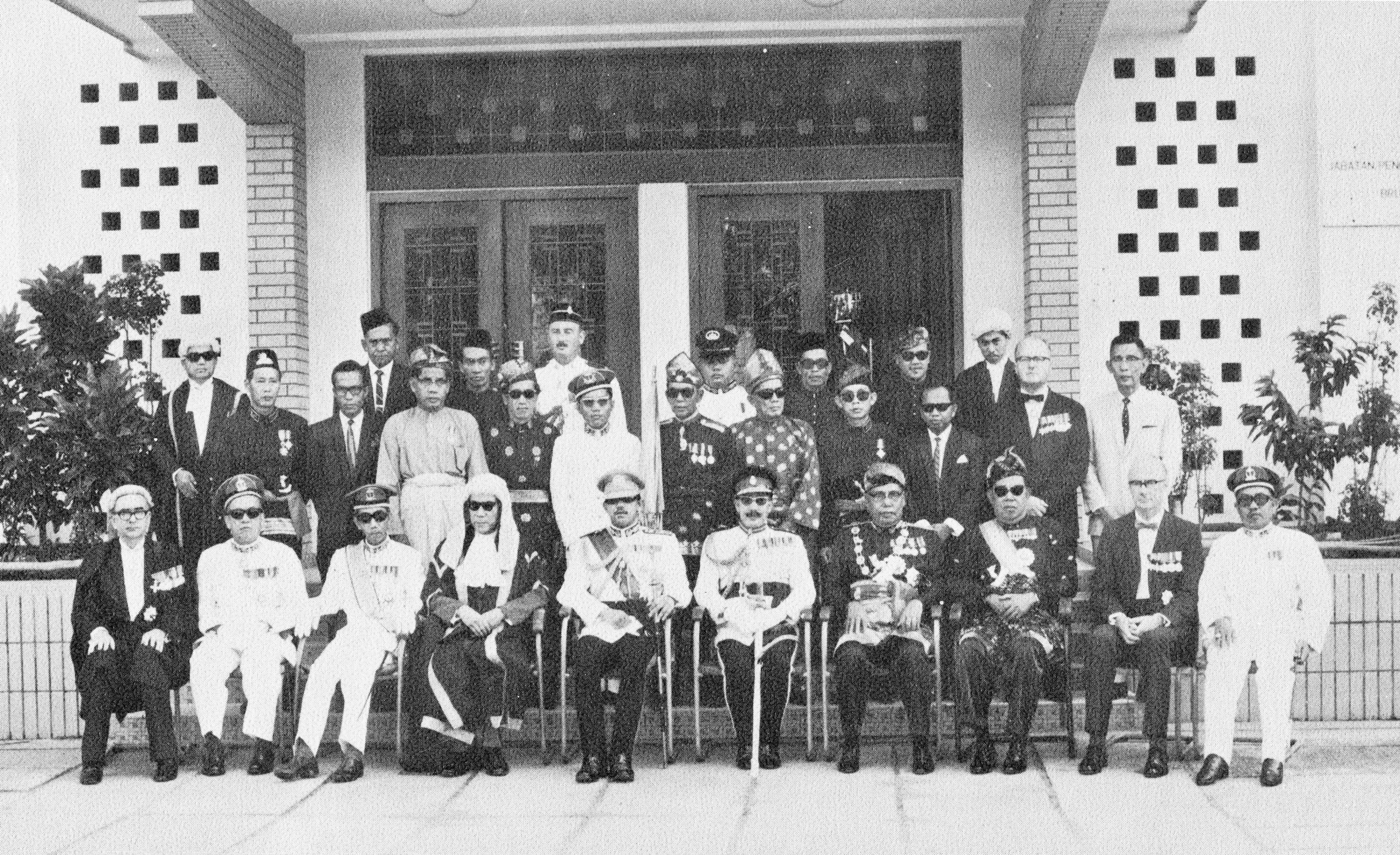
Opening of the Legislative Council on 11 December 1967. Sultan Hassanal Bolkiah sits at the centre.

=== Early Establishment and Constitutional Foundations (1959–1962) ===
The period of the State Council came to an end in September 1959 with the adoption of Brunei's first codified Constitution. The Legislative, Executive, and Privy Councils took the role of the council itself. The Legislative Council was established in 1959 by virtue of Article 23 of Brunei's Constitution. The 1959 constitution included five advisory bodies, including a Legislative Council, and granted the sultan full executive authority. When the left-wing Brunei People's Party (BPP), which aspired to overthrow the monarchy, gained all 10 of the council's elected seats in 1962, Sultan Omar Ali Saifuddien III invalidated the results.

Following the nation's first election on 30 and 31 August 1962, the Legislative Council's initial meeting was held on 10 October 1962. Part of the constitutional rules governing general elections were suspended in 1962, and members' seats were filled by royal appointment beginning on 28 August 1963. Upon the establishment of the new Legislative Council in September 1962, the party attempted to forward a motion aimed at stopping the formation of Malaysia. The council meeting was rescheduled until 5 December because it was afraid of losing the discussions. The BPP sent a resolution to the government of Brunei to be presented in the next council meeting prior to its convening.

The Brunei People's Independence Party (BAKER) party's Secretary-General II, Zainal Abidin Puteh, presented a motion during the May 1968 Legislative Council Meeting that called for Brunei to become independent and establish a democratic system of governance. He insisted throughout the conference that a poll be conducted by the government to determine the people's desires for independence and constitutional progress. A spokesperson of the BAKER party, Pengiran Mohammad Samli bin Pengiran Lahab, also called for the introduction of a democratic type of governance in Brunei in May 1968.

On 12 April 1970, the 1965-elected council was dissolved after completing their 5-year term. The 1970 elected-council was dissolved on 15 December 1977 with the approval of the Sultan of Brunei, according to the Chapter 55 of the 1959 Constitution. The Sultan agreed to reform and re-elect several members from the previous council. A new council was officially reconvened on 22 December 1977. Sultan Hassanal Bolkiah dissolved the council on the following day. The inaugural meeting of the council took place on 27 December 1983, and it was disbanded on 13 February 1984. Hence, legislative powers were fully vested in the Sultan.

=== Reinstatement and Proposed Reforms (2004–2005) ===
After a 21-year hiatus, Sultan Hassanal Bolkiah reconvened the Legislative Council on 25 September 2004, with the proposed modification to the 1959 constitution as its first item on the agenda. The Council approved a constitutional proposal that would have increased its size to 45 seats, 15 of which would be elected. The Sultan disestablished the council on 1 September 2005 and, on the following day, reestablished the Council based on the amended version of Brunei's Constitution, commencing the first session. Five members of the new Legislative Council, who were indirectly elected to represent village councils, were appointed by the Sultan in September 2005.

In 2006 and 2007, plans for a 45-member legislature with 15 seats up for public vote were still on the table, but elections were still not scheduled by year's end. All state authority remains in the hands of the House of Bolkiah and chosen successors, and the Internal Security Act (ISA) keeps the sultan's personal authority largely untouched.

The Legislative Council met in 2006 and 2007 to examine government spending, suggesting that it has adopted budget review as a regular duty in recent years. The plans for elected Council members, Brunei's 2006 membership in the Asian Development Bank, and government initiatives to promote the private sector while combating corruption and radical Islam are all considered preparations for the anticipated depletion of the nation's oil and gas reserves, which currently make up 90% of state revenues. This modest increase in Council activity and increased focus on government spending were all reported as part of these preparations. With the money, the government has long been able to stave off calls for political reform by keeping the majority of the populace in work, lavishing them with benefits, and exempting them from paying income tax.

A member of the Legislative Council asked information from the second finance minister of the nation during a meeting in March 2007 regarding government investment organizations like the Workers Trust Fund and the Brunei Investment Agency (BIA). The Minister of Home Affairs, a member of the sultan's appointed cabinet, urged for prudent use of the national budget in April in yet another sporadic appeal for accountability.

On 6 March 2007, the Sultan gave his permission to be present at the International Convention Centre in Berakas for the opening ceremony of the first sitting of the Legislative Council's third session. Additionally present were Prince Mohamed Bolkiah, Minister of Foreign Affairs and Commerce, and Prince Al-Muhtadee Billah, Crown Prince and Senior Minister in the Prime Minister's Office. The People's Awareness Party (PAKAR) was completely disbanded, and the president of the Brunei National Solidarity Party (PPKB) was forced to resign, with the party dissolving by 2008. In addition, the government's Registrar of Societies tightened its supervision over political party activity in 2007.

The first meeting of the fourth session of the Legislative Council (2008–2009) convened on 4 March 2008 at the newly completed Dewan Majlis building on Jalan Kebangsaan. The session was officially opened by Sultan Hassanal Bolkiah by signing a plaque shortly after receiving the Royal Salute and inspecting the guard of honour by the personnel of the Royal Brunei Police Force (RBPF). He was accompanied by Prince Mohamed Bolkiah, Minister of Foreign Affairs and Trade, and Crown Prince Al-Muhtadee Billah, Senior Minister in the Prime Minister's Office.

== Roles ==
Since its creation in 1959, the Legislative Council has played significant roles towards Brunei; not only to consider and approve budgets and revenue estimates, but also to advise the Sultan on the drive of the Government, to review policies implemented by the Government and to pass bills and motions brought by the Government and other members of the council.

== Legislative procedure ==
The Legislative Council of Brunei adheres to procedures similar to those observed in other Commonwealth parliamentary systems. All bills introduced in the Council undergo three readings. Prior to being tabled, however, each bill must receive approval from the Council of Cabinet Ministers.

Following passage by the Legislative Council, a bill requires Royal Assent to become an Act. In accordance with the Council's Standing Orders, statements by members must be addressed to the Speaker or, in the context of committee sessions, to the committee chair. For legislation to take effect, it must be published in the official government gazette.

== Speaker of the Legislative Council ==
The Speaker of the Legislative Council of Brunei (Yang Di-Pertua Majlis Mesyuarat Negara) is responsible for presiding over sessions of the council, managing its proceedings, and overseeing the voting process. The Speaker is appointed by the Sultan of Brunei and is ranked fourth in the national order of precedence. Unlike in some other parliamentary systems, the Speaker does not assume the role of acting Head of State during periods of transition. The position plays a central role in facilitating the functions of the Legislative Council, which is a key institution within Brunei's governance structure.

== Sessions ==
- 1st session (2005–2006)
- 2nd session (2006–2007)
- 3rd session (2007–2008)
- 4th session (2008–2009)
- 5th session (2009–2010)
- 6th session (2010–2011)
- 7th session (2011–2012)
- 8th session (2012–2013)
- 9th session (2013–2014)
- 10th session (2014–2015)
- 11th session (2015–2016)
- 12th session (2016–2017)
- 13th session (2017–2018)
- 14th session (2018–2019)
- 15th session (2019–2020)
- 16th session (2020–2021)
- 17th session (2021–2022)
- 18th session (2022–2023)
- 19th session (2023–2024)
- 20th session (2024–2025)
- 21st session (2025–present)

== Membership ==
The Legislative Council of Brunei consists of the Sultan, the Crown Prince (Note: The Crown Prince is a member of Cabinet of Brunei as Senior Minister to the Prime Minister's Office. Therefore, he is an ex officio member of the Legislative Council.), and cabinet ministers, alongside three distinct categories of appointed members: those with titles, those representing districts, and those chosen for their outstanding contributions to the nation. All members, apart from the Sultan, are appointed by the Sultan for five year terms in accordance with Article 24 of the Constitution.

To be eligible for membership in the Legislative Council, a person must be a citizen of Brunei Darussalam and at least 21 years old. However, there are several disqualifications that apply. Firstly, a person who has pledged allegiance or loyalty to a foreign power or has acquired citizenship or exercised the rights of citizenship in another country may not become a member. Similarly, anyone who has demonstrated disloyalty or dissatisfaction toward the Sultan through actions or speech is excluded. Secondly, individuals who have been declared mentally unsound under any law in Brunei Darussalam are also disqualified.

Any individual who has been convicted of a crime and sentenced to death, imprisonment, or a fine of B$1,000 or more, whether in Brunei or elsewhere, is not eligible for membership either.

=== Ex-officio members ===
Since 4 June 2026, following a reorganization of the Cabinet that had been in place since 24 October 2023, the following members of the Council of Cabinet Ministers have served as ex officio members of the Legislative Council:

Ministry	Minister
Prime Minister's Office	HM Sultan Hassanal Bolkiah (Prime Minister); HRH Crown Prince Al-Muhtadee Billah (Senior Minister); HRH Prince Abdul Malik (Minister); Hon. Isa Ibrahim (Minister and His Majesty's Special Advisor); Hon. Maj. Gen. (Rtd.) Halbi Mohammad Yussof (Minister); Hon. Sufian Sabtu (Minister)
Ministry of Transport and Infocommunications	Hon. Riza Yunos
Ministry of Culture, Youth and Sports	Hon. Pengiran Shamhary
Ministry of Defence	HM Sultan Hassanal Bolkiah
Ministry of Development	Hon. Juanda Abdul Rashid
Ministry of Education	Hon. Romaizah Mohd Salleh
Ministry of Finance and Economy	HM Sultan Hassanal Bolkiah; Hon. Dr. Amin Liew Abdullah (Second Minister)
Ministry of Foreign Affairs	HRH Prince Abdul Mateen; Hon. Erywan Yusof (Second Minister)
Ministry of Health	Hon. Dr. Isham Jaafar
Ministry of Home Affairs	Hon. Ahmaddin Abdul Rahman
Ministry of Primary Resources and Tourism	Hon. Abdul Manaf Metussin
Ministry of Religious Affairs	Hon. Pengiran Mohammad Tashim

=== Titled persons ===
Title	Member	Portfolio
Pehin Orang Kaya Laila Setia Dato Seri Setia Awang Haji	Abdul Rahman Ibrahim	Minister of Finance II (2015–2018); Minister at the Prime Minister's Office (2005–2018)
Pehin Orang Kaya Johan Pahlawan Dato Seri Setia Awang Haji	Adanan Yusof	Minister of Health (2010–2015); Minister of Home Affairs (2005–2010); Deputy Minister of Home Affairs (2002–2005)
Pehin Orang Kaya Indera Pahlawan Dato Seri Setia Awang Haji	Suyoi Osman	Minister of Education (2015–2018); Minister of Development (2010–2015); Minister of Health (2005–2010); Ambassador of Brunei to France (1991–1996)

=== Persons who have achieved distinction ===
Pursuant to Second Schedule of Article 24 (1) (a) (iii), these seats are allocated to individuals who have achieved distinction in their respective professional fields or who have made significant contributions to communities across Brunei. These individuals are selected by the Sultan for their notable accomplishments and service to the nation.

Title	Member	Portfolio
Hajah	Safiah Abdul Salam	Islamic Studies Department, Ministry of Religious Affairs
Mr	Lau How Teck	Director of Hua Ho Department Store (since 2018); Vice President of the Brunei-China Belt and Road Promotion Association Council (2022–2024); Member of the Chinese General Chamber of Commerce's Honorary Advisory Group (2024–2026)
Ms	Chong Chin Yee	CEO and co-founder of Memori, UnikLearn and Mirath; Board member of the ASEAN Young Women Entrepreneurs Club; Vice President of the Young Entrepreneur Association of Brunei
Dr. Haji	Mahali Momin	Director of Schools' Inspectorate at the Ministry of Education
Haji	Salleh Bostaman	Managing Director of Brunei LNG (2008–2012)
Hajah	Rosmawatty Abdul Mumin	Permanent Secretary (Upstream) in the Energy Division, Prime Minister's Office
Pengiran Haji	Isa Aliuddin	President of the Brunei Association of Agricultural Farmers; Managing Director of Maya Breeder Farm

=== District representatives ===
Members of the Legislative Council representing Brunei's four districts are appointed by the Sultan from among local community leaders, including penghulu (township heads) and village heads. The representatives are drawn from the 39 mukims—the second-level administrative divisions under the district level. Since 2015, penghulu have been elected directly by residents within their respective areas, providing a limited form of local electoral representation within the otherwise appointed legislature.

Constituency	Member	Position
Belait 1	Salleh Othman	Penghulu of Mukim Bukit Sawat
Belait 2	Mohammad bin Abdullah @ Lim Swee Ann	Village head of Kampong Bukit Sawat
Tutong 1	Tekpin Ya’akub	Penghulu of Mukim Ukong
Tutong 2	Abdul Aziz Hamdan	Village head of Kampong Sengkarai
Temburong	Sulaiman Nasir	Village head of Kampong Labu Estate and Kampong Piasau-Piasau
Brunei–Muara 1	Amran Maidin	Penghulu of Mukim Lumapas
Brunei–Muara 2	Lawi Lamat	Village head of Kampong Subok
Brunei–Muara 3	Zainol Mohamed	Village head of Kampong Putat
Brunei–Muara 4	Mohamad Ali Tanjong	Village head of Kampong Lumapas 'B'
Brunei–Muara 5	Daud Jihan	Village head of Kampong Belimbing

=== Clerk to the Legislative Council ===
As of 9 January 2024, the position is held by Dr. Dayang Hajah Huraini binti Pehin Orang Kaya Setia Jaya Dato Paduka Awang Haji Hurairah. She succeeded Pehin Orang kaya Pekerma Jaya Dato Paduka Haji Judin bin Haji Asar, who had held the position since 1 January 1993.

== Council symbol ==
The white wig worn by the speaker during each LegCo session from 1965 to 1983 was a symbol of tradition and authority. However, starting in 2004, this was replaced with a specially adorned Malay songkok. The songkok is encircled with intricate woven patterns featuring motifs of Bunga Paku-Paku, Tadas, Bunga Akar Linggayong, and Belah Rotan, symbolising local cultural heritage. It is also decorated with the official emblem of the Legislative Council. The width of the woven ornamentation measures 3.8 centimetres.

== Dewan Majlis building ==
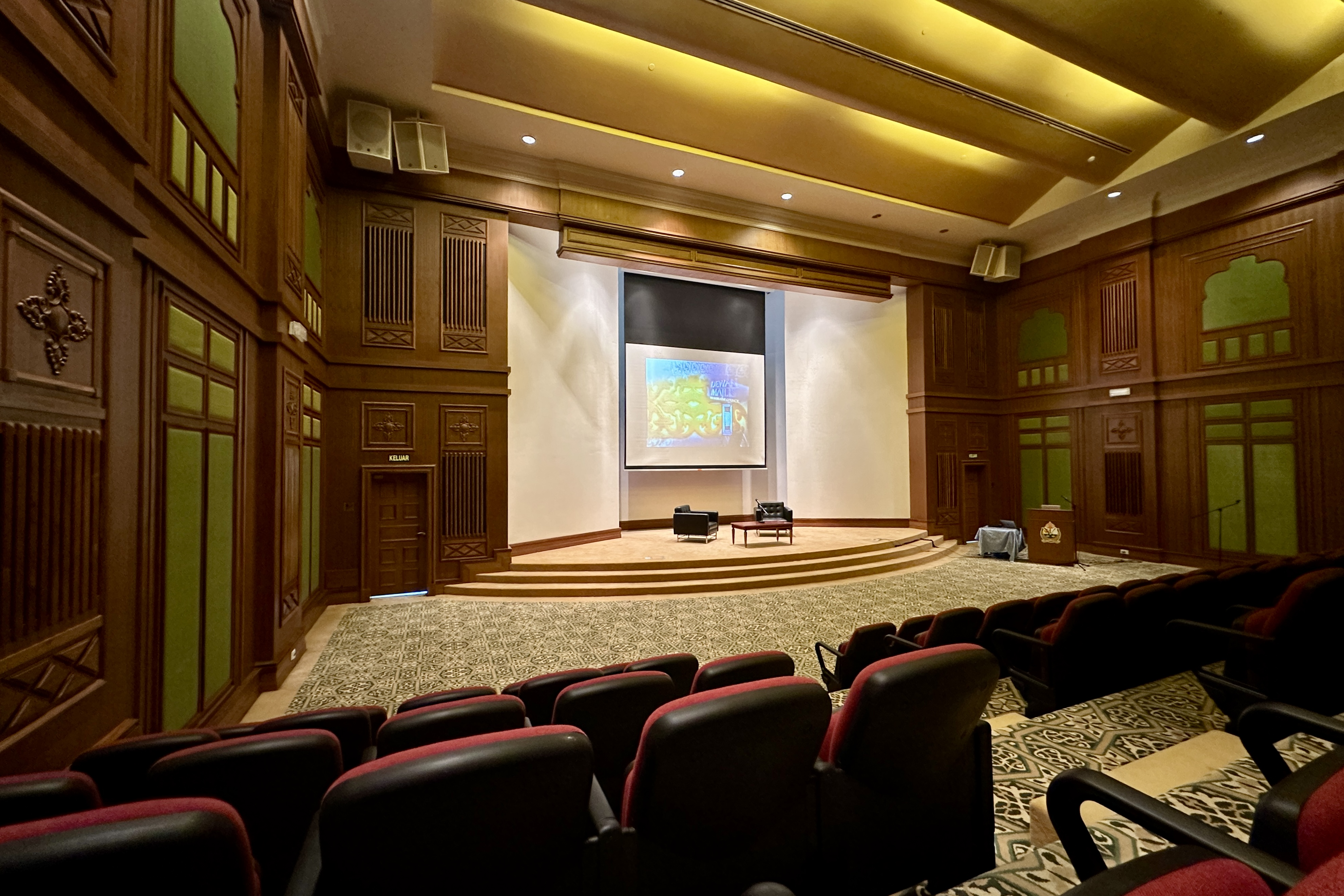
Auditorium inside the Dewan Majlis building

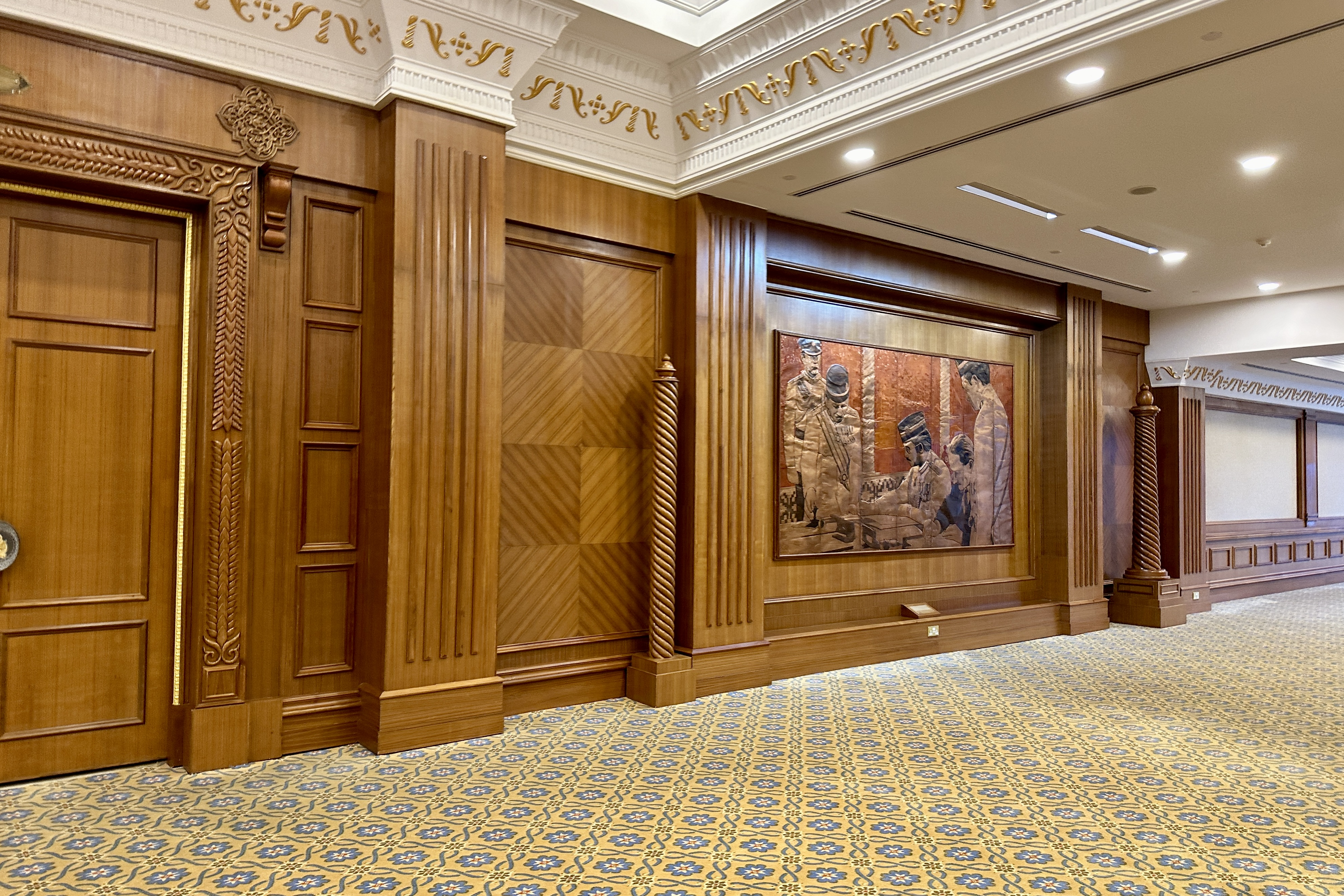
Hall inside the Dewan Majlis building

The new Dewan Majlis building, approved by Sultan Hassanal Bolkiah, was constructed with a budget of B$62,199,466.53 and covers an area of approximately 26 acres (11 ha), including a 3-acre lake. Located along Jalan Kebangsaan, it is 15 minutes from the city centre. The building features a unique design inspired by classical Greek and Roman architecture, symbolising order, strength, and stability, while incorporating local Malay and Islamic cultural elements.

The facility comprises three primary sections: the central block houses the Legislative Chamber and Banquet Hall; the right wing contains the Speaker's office, a library, a VIP lounge, and a gymnasium; and the left wing includes administrative offices, a parade ground, a staff canteen, and a mosque.

Notable design elements of the building include symbolic columns, such as five and nine columns at the porte-cochère representing the 1959 Constitution declaration, and eight and four columns leading to the chamber symbolising Brunei's full independence in 1984. The building's dome is encircled by 29 windows and columns, symbolising Sultan Hassanal Bolkiah as the 29th ruler of Brunei.

Since achieving independence, the first time that the nation held the council meeting at the new Dewan Majlis building was on 4 March 2008, the construction for which began in March 2005 under the 8th National Development Plan. Judin Asar, the Legislative Council's clerk between 2004 and 2024, claimed that the new structure would help the council carry out its mission to provide better services to the government and country, particularly those pertaining to the Privy Council, Legislative Council, and cabinet ministers meetings.

== See also ==
- Politics of Brunei
- List of legislatures by country
