= Kementerian Kesihatan =

Kementerian Kesihatan may refer to:

- Ministry of Health (Brunei), a government ministry in Brunei
- Ministry of Health (Malaysia), a federal government ministry in Malaysia
- Ministry of Health (Singapore), a government ministry in Singapore
