= Salleh Bostaman =

Bruneian businessman and politician

Salleh Bostaman SNB
- صالح بوستامن
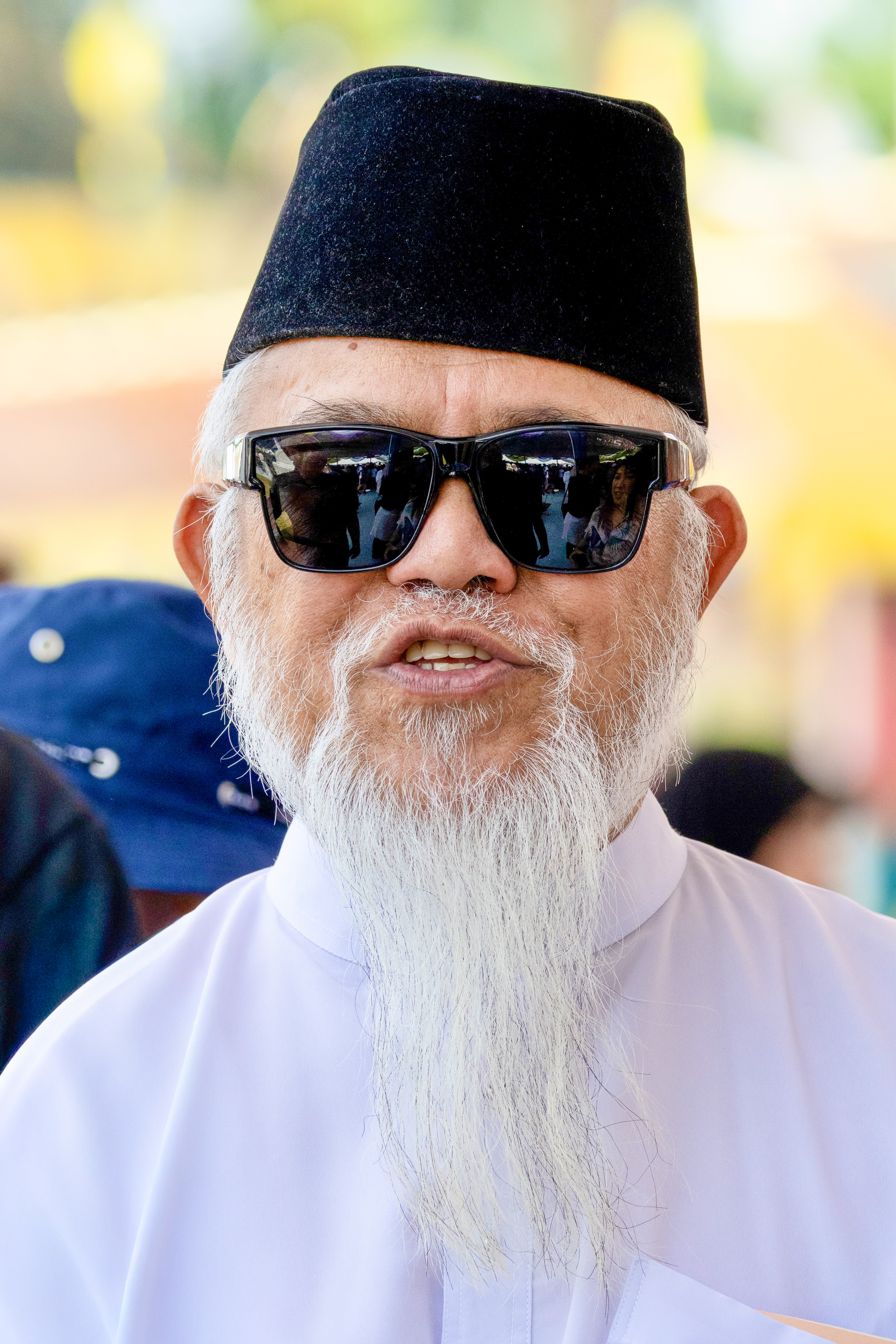
- Salleh Bostaman in 2024

Member of the Legislative Council
- In office 20 January 2023
- Monarch: Hassanal Bolkiah

Personal details
- Born: Brunei
- Occupation: Businessman; politician

Salleh Bostaman bin Haji Zainal Abidin is a Bruneian businessman and politician who was among the members of Brunei's Legislative Council (LegCo) appointed in 2023. Additionally, he was the Deputy President of Football Federation of Brunei Darussalam (FFBD), Football Association of Brunei Darussalam (FABD), and chairman of the Institute of Mechanical Engineers Brunei Group (IMechE-BruG).

== Early career ==
Commencing in mid-June 2008, Salleh Bostaman was named Brunei LNG's new managing director. He left his post as Brunei Shell Petroleum's (BSP) asset director to take up the new one. As the BSP's asset director, Rosmawatty Abdul Mumin, who at the time was the west asset manager for BSP, took over for him.

During her three-day state visit to Brunei, Queen Beatrix was welcomed by BSP at their Head Office in Panaga, Seria on 22 January 2013. In the BSP Managing Director's Office, the royal entourage signed a visitor's book and a parchment, and in the BSP Atrium, Deputy Managing Director Salleh Bostaman gave a welcome speech. He emphasised the positive 84-year oil and gas industry connection between Brunei and the Netherlands.

== Political career ==
On 20 January 2023, Sultan Hassanal Bolkiah selected him as one among the distinct individuals to the LegCo. On 28 January, the Department of Councils' Dewan Persidangan hosted the swearing-In ceremony for the newly appointed LegCo members.

On 14 February 2023, Salleh Bostaman led a meeting between LegCo members and the Prime Minister's Office (PMO), where PMO Ministers highlighted the 'Whole-of-Nation Approach' for socio-economic development in collaboration with Government and non-Government agencies. They focused on four key areas: public service governance, vision, securities and law, and energy, to advance Wawasan Brunei 2035 and ensure citizen welfare. Salleh Bostaman provided recommendations to improve the PMO's service delivery during the session.

=== 19th LegCo session ===
On 8 March 2023, at the 19th LegCo session, Salleh Bostaman brought up the fact that between 1,000 and 2,000 civil servants in Brunei retire each year. The Public Service Commission's (PSC) goal of filling 1,000 positions annually raised doubts in his mind. Minister Halbi answered that the PSC fills positions based on openings provided by government ministries, noting that 1,122 openings were sent to the PSC for posting in 2022. A total of 2,104 positions were filled in the same year by reserve candidates, promotions (675), new appointments (1,425), and appointments following retirement (22). Minister Halbi also stated that departments must routinely conduct self-evaluations to make sure they are in line with Wawasan Brunei 2035.

On 9 March 2023, Minister Mohd Amin highlighted that the Bruneian stock exchange's readiness depends on both the system and the preparedness of banks and businesses, emphasising the need for responsible corporate secretaries and experienced business directors. He also stressed the importance of public awareness campaigns about investment risks, in response to Salleh Bostaman's suggestion, before the stock exchange's opening. On the same day, Minister Ahmaddin addressed concerns from Salleh Bostaman about job descriptions requiring local employees to live in their assigned regions. He clarified that regional offices provide logistical support to help staff adapt to local challenges, with residency being a key performance indicator. The minister also discussed the issue of business opportunities for young people, noting that while such spaces are available, they have not always been popular.

=== 20th LegCo session ===
The B$50 million Kampong Ayer project, which is part of the National Development Plan (RKN) and intends to provide micro-infrastructure for the cottage industry, was discussed by Minister Ahmaddin during the 20th LegCo session on 4 March 2024. In response to Salleh Bostaman's question concerning the funding for Kampong Ayer restoration and the IT system, the minister clarified that although there isn't a project application specifically for that, the development might concentrate on areas like the Brunei River and the dock, necessitating collaboration with the business community. He cited ongoing discussions with traders to extend these efforts to other places and referenced comparable initiatives in Kuala Belait to revitalise the Seria market. The minister stressed that enterprises must take advantage of the chances that the government presents.

Minister Abdul Manaf announced on 6 March 2024, that efforts have been made to increase the appeal of tourism bundles across Brunei, including Muara and Temburong, with over 200 packages available online. The Tourism and Development Department (TDD) is responsible for enhancing these locations' attractions. Salleh Bostaman commended TDD's success, particularly their achievement in helping Kuala Belait become the 4th ASEAN Clean Tourist City at the ASEAN Tourism Standards Awards.

LegCo members questioned the Ministry of Religious Affairs (MoRA) on 7 March 2024, discussing topics such zakat and the halal certification procedure. Salleh Bostaman advocated for a plan to raise zakat collections and raise awareness of its significance. He also asked how the mosque's accessible amenities for the disabled were doing.

On 13 March 2024, the LegCo session highlighted improvements in Bruneian students' PISA 2022 scores in science, reading, and mathematics compared to 2018. Minister Romaizah acknowledged the success of the strategy but emphasized the need for further curriculum reform, better ICT, professional development, and ongoing student assessment. She also noted that Brunei, along with three other nations, showed gains in all three PISA domains, and linked these improvements to early childhood education reforms and the reduction of the compulsory education age to five years.

Salleh Bostaman brought up the subject of deserving civil servants being unappreciated at the 20th LegCo session meeting on 16 March 2024. Although Minister Halbi acknowledged that public officials receive little appreciation, he underlined that their commitment to their jobs is what drives national growth and enhances peoples' quality of life on a daily basis. He urged those employed by the government to preserve a strong sense of national identity and to have faith in Allah, the Almighty, saying that sincerity and tawakal will result in blessings and acknowledgment from Allah.

On 23 March 2024, the 20th LegCo session came to an end. During the course of 18 days, over 700 questions were asked and members gave adjournment addresses. Salleh Bostaman guaranteed that concerns presented were addressed, even if they were not covered by the media, and appreciated the interest of the public in the LegCo meeting.

== Personal life ==
According to Borneo Bulletin, on 26 August 2012, at his home in Kampong Pandan, Kuala Belait, Deputy Managing Director of BSP Salleh Bostaman and his family held a Hari Raya open house for invited visitors and community members in the spirit of the festive festival.

== Honours ==
Throughout his career, he has earned the following honours:

- Order of Setia Negara Brunei Third Class (SNB; 15 July 2011)
