= Judin Asar =

Bruneian civil servant (born 1942)

Yang Dimuliakan Pehin Orang Kaya Pekerma Jaya Dato Paduka Judin Asar DPMB SLJ POAS PHBS PBLI PJK PKL
- ابو بكر جمبول
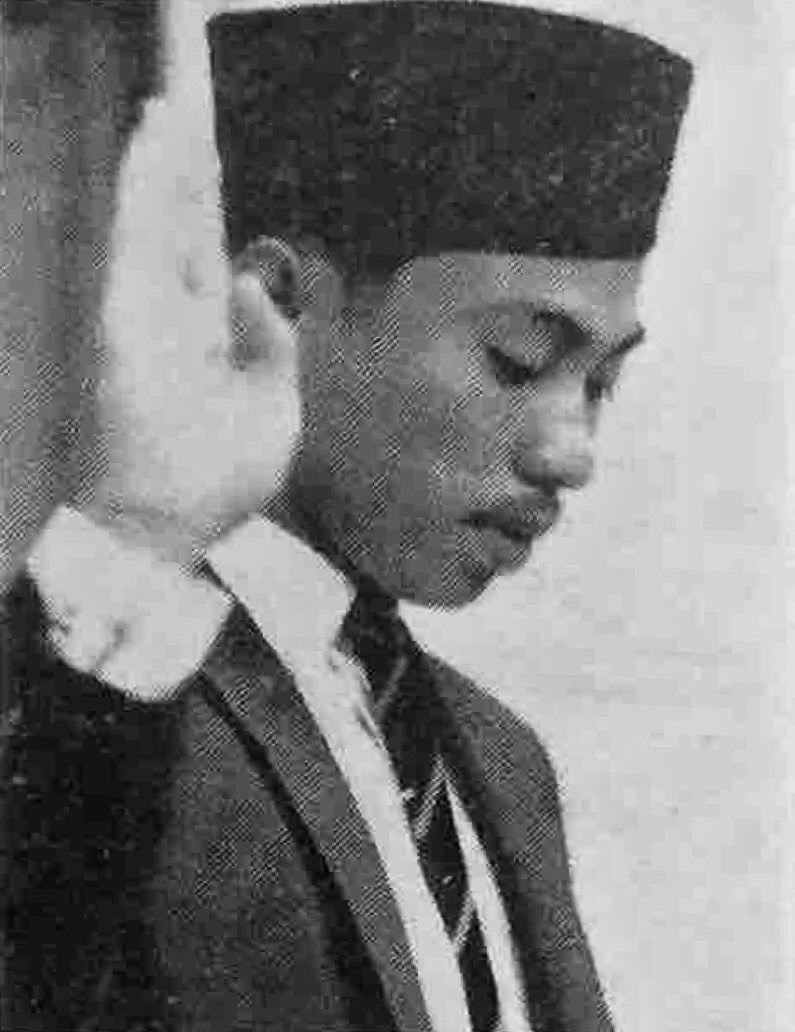
- Judin in 1965

Clerk of the Legislative Council of Brunei
- In office 25 September 2004 – 9 January 2024
- Succeeded by: Huraini Hurairah

Personal details
- Born: 13 April 1942 (age 84) Brunei
- Spouse: Zaharah Jaafar (m. 1968)
- Children: 2
- Education: Sultan Omar Ali Saifuddien College
- Alma mater: Keele University (MA)
- Occupation: Civil servant

Judin bin Haji Asar (Note: His full name is Pehin Orang kaya Pekerma Jaya Dato Paduka Haji Judin bin Haji Asar.) (born 13 April 1942) is a Bruneian aristocrat and civil servant who served as the clerk of the Legislative Council of Brunei (LegCo) from 2004 to 2024.

== Early life and education ==
Judin bin Haji Asar was born on 13 April 1942 in Brunei. He began his early education at Sengkurong Malay School from 1948 to 1953 before continuing his secondary education at Sultan Omar Ali Saifuddien College from 1954 to 1961, where he obtained a GCE O Level qualification. Later, in 1990, he pursued higher education, earning a Master of Arts (MA) degree from Keele University in the United Kingdom.

== Career ==
At the beginning of his career, Judin was appointed as a trainee officer in the Brunei Administrative Service (BAS) cadet in August 1961 and assigned to the Temburong District. He served as an administrative officer from 16 September 1961 to 15 September 1964. After six months in service, he was selected to participate in a six-month training course in Peninsular Malaysia alongside ten other BAS Cadet officers. During this period, he was stationed in Taiping and Ipoh, Perak, for four months before being transferred to Port Dickson, where he collaborated with officers from the Malayan Civil Service.

In August 1962, Judin was assigned to the development office under the leadership of Inche Sa'at Marzuki, the department head and a seconded officer from Peninsular Malaysia. Earlier that year, from 31 January to 18 August, he had attended an administrative course in the Federation of Malaya. The Brunei revolt of 1962 erupted shortly after he and ten other Brunei Administrative Service (BAS) cadets returned from their training. (Note: A state-wide curfew and the emergency order were in effect at that period. The curfew was loosened for just two hours every day, and the 1959 Brunei Constitution was suspended. After the curfew restrictions were lifted, they were told to come into the office within the hours that were allowed.) Upon their return, they were posted to the development department located in the Secretariat Building. He, along with four colleagues, was accommodated at the Government Guesthouse Class G on Jalan Litang, opposite Saint Andrew's Church and near the old General Hospital building.

In 1963, Judin was transferred to the Radio and Information Office, where he served as a liaison officer specialising in psychological warfare. From 1 December 1964 to 13 April 1965, he was reassigned to the Brunei–Muara District Office as a BAS trainee officer, continuing his efforts in psychological operations. In February 1964, he moved to the department of councils of state, where he was appointed assistant clerk of councils from 14 September 1965 to 31 December 1971. His training included a legal affairs course at the House of Commons in London and Stormont House in Northern Ireland, which he completed over three months beginning in October 1966.

From 1972 to 1984, Judin served as the clerk of councils before being transferred to the Ministry of Defence. In February 1984, he was appointed permanent secretary at the Ministry of Defence under the leadership of the retired sultan Omar Ali Saifuddien III, who was serving as minister of defence at the time. On 1 April 1986, he returned to the department of councils of state as the secretary of councils. In 1993, he had been appointed secretary to the Council of Cabinet Ministers while continuing as clerk of the Privy Council, positions he held until his retirement in 1997. Subsequently, his service was extended on a contractual basis, and he continues to serve as secretary to the Council of Cabinet Ministers.

Between 1996 and 1999, Judin served as acting permanent secretary at the Ministry of Defence while simultaneously holding the positions of secretary to the Council of Cabinet Ministers and clerk of the Privy Council. Following the re-establishment of the LegCo on 25 September 2004, he was appointed as its clerk, a role he fulfilled alongside his other duties. On 7 May 2011, he represented Brunei at the 18th ASEAN Summit in Jakarta as part of the ASEAN Inter-Parliamentary Assembly (AIPA) delegation alongside the sultan. He was succeeded by Huraini Hurairah on 9 January 2024.

== Personal life ==
Judin married Datin Hajah Zaharah binti Haji Jaafar in 1968, and the couple have two daughters, Hajah Seri Lailawati and Hajah Seri Mawardi. As of 2019, he has four grandchildren.

== Titles, styles and honours ==
=== Titles and styles ===
On 8 July 1997, Judin was bestowed upon by Sultan Hassanal Bolkiah the Manteri title of Pehin Orang Kaya Pekerma Jaya, styled as Yang Dimuliakan.

=== Awards ===
- AIPA Distinguished Service Award (2024)

=== Honours ===
Judin has been awarded the following national honours;

- Order of Seri Paduka Mahkota Brunei Second Class (DPMB; 15 July 1979) – Dato Paduka
- Order of Paduka Seri Laila Jasa Third Class (SLJ; 12 February 1969)
- Omar Ali Saifuddin Medal First Class (POAS; 23 September 1967)
- Sultan Hassanal Bolkiah Medal First Class (PHBS; 15 July 2010)
- Pingat Bakti Laila Ikhlas (PBLI; 1998)
- Meritorious Service Medal (PJK; 1987)
- Long Service Medal (PKL; 1982)
- Coronation Medal First Class (1969)
- Proclamation of Independence Medal (1997)
- National Day Silver Jubilee Medal (23 February 2009)
