= Rosmawatty Abdul Mumin =

Bruneian civil servant and politician

Yang Berhormat Rosmawatty Abdul Mumin
- روسماواتتي عبدالمومين
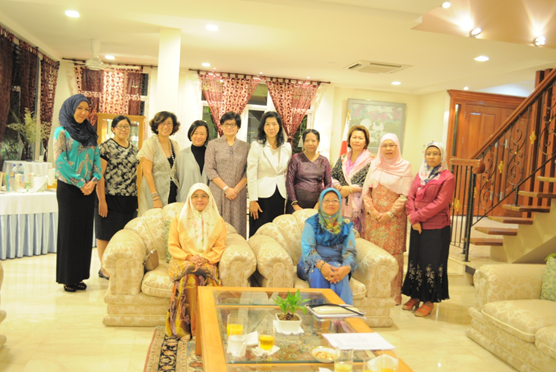
- Rosmawatty (pink) in 2015

Member of the Legislative Council
- Incumbent
- Assumed office 20 January 2023

Personal details
- Born: Brunei
- Education: Keele University (BSc)
- Occupation: Politician; civil servant
- Awards: See here

Rosmawatty binti Haji Abdul Mumin is a Bruneian civil servant and politician who was appointed a member of Brunei's Legislative Council (LegCo) in 2023. She became the first woman to hold a director position at Brunei Shell Petroleum (BSP). She was the first female manager from Brunei to hold this role at BSP and the Shell Group in the Asia-Pacific area.

== Education and early career ==
Rosmawatty graduated from the University of Keele with a combined degree in physics and chemistry.

Rosmawatty began working for BSP in 1983 and had a number of roles till 2013. In addition to being the first female director of BSP and manager at BSP, she was also the first female member of the senior leadership teams at Shell Asia Pacific and BSP. She has improved oil and gas production both onshore and offshore while working to advance BSP through a number of high technical roles, including the prestigious Asset Manager of the West Unit. She was the first woman to join BSP's senior leadership team when she was appointed Asset Director on 2 May 2008. She took over as the company's asset director from Salleh Bostaman while serving as the west asset manager.

Rosmawatty has been employed by the Prime Minister's Office as the Permanent Secretary (Upstream) in the Energy Division on 15 August 2013, and has been tasked with the demanding and precise mission of supplying "sustainable energy for Brunei Darussalam's prosperity," as delineated in the recently released Energy White Paper.

== Political career ==
Under Sultan Hassanal Bolkiah's orders, he has approved Rosmawatty's appointment as one of the new LegCo members. The appointments take effect on 20 January 2023.

=== 19th LegCo session ===
Rosmawatty brought up the issue of Brunei's poor oil and gas output affecting the country's income due to extended reaction times and delays in recovery efforts at the 19th LegCo session on 7 March 2023. The BSP has spent a lot of money on rehabilitation during the last five to eight years, but the output results are still not up to par. In order to create a good example, she urged that the Department of Energy reiterate the urgency to BSP and TotalEnergies EP (Brunei). She also suggested that locals be appointed to important leadership roles in BSP. In reaction, Minister Mohd Amin Liew acknowledged the difficulties, pointing out that the COVID-19 pandemic had caused delays and that the oil and gas industry needed both local and foreign professionals with experience.

On 11 March 2023, Rosmawatty suggested that Brunei's foreign embassies may provide employment chances for local youth. Minister Erywan retorted that although positions are open, they are contingent upon local rules and regulations, which occasionally limit employment to residents and may need for specialised training. Although several Bruneians now hold similar positions overseas, he pointed out that the selection process takes into account both the qualifications of the applicants and the demands of the host country.

In response to criticism from around the world about its Syariah law, Minister Erywan reaffirmed Brunei's dedication to its customs, culture, and religion. Later on the same day, Rosmawatty inquired about the Ministry of Foreign Affairs' (MFA) role in addressing opposing viewpoints, he stressed that although other nations might not agree with Brunei's tenets, the nation will uphold its sovereignty and ideals. He continued by saying that Brunei is still dedicated to upholding human rights principles and is strengthening its diplomatic efforts in order to deal with these issues by working with the Ministry of Religious Affairs (MoRA).

On 13 March 2023, Minister Romaizah announced that, as a result of the pandemic-related school closures, a recent poll indicated low student performance. Despite not fulfilling national literacy Key Performance Indicators (KPI), the minister stressed the advantages of working together between local and foreign teachers to improve English language education in answer to Rosmawatty's question concerning replacing teachers from the CfBT Education Services with local ones. The Ministry of Education (MoE) has budgeted $27.6 million for CfBT teachers in 2023–2024 and intends to hire additional English teachers, including native speakers, while resolving recruiting obstacles and taking affordable alternatives into account.

From 1 to 2 June 2023, at the ASEAN-Korea Forum, talks centred on improving logistics efficiency and long-term climate change collaboration. In light of the ongoing disputes, the delegation from Brunei, headed by Pehin Dato Suyoi, stressed the value of solid ASEAN-Korea ties for future prosperity. In order to further regional climate studies, Rosmawatty donated $2.1 million to the ASEAN Climate Change Centre, demonstrating Brunei's dedication to environmentally friendly growth.

=== 20th LegCo session ===
Minister Ahmaddin highlighted lack of personal identification, lack of family support, and financial restraints as factors that lead to repeat offending during the 20th LegCo session on 2 March 2024. He pointed out that 102 of the 545 prisoners released in 2023 had been convicted again, and 74 of the 395 released in 2022 were reoffender. In response to Rosmawatty's concerns, the minister said that although the topic of foreign labourers' permits is being reviewed, there is a national ambition to have more locals operating stores. He also noted that foreign workers have easier access because of the Sultan Haji Omar Ali Saifuddien Bridge.

Minister Abdul Manaf stated on 5 March 2024, that the Ministry of Primary Resources and Tourism (MPRT) is collaborating with banks to finance youngsters in agriculture. These banks include Bank Usahawan, Bank Islam Brunei Darussalam, and maybe Perbadanan Tabung Amanah Islam Brunei (TAIB). He underlined the significance of youth getting involved with agriculture for ensuring food security and mentioned that ten youth have been chosen for the program's initial phase. The ministry will keep encouraging and supporting young people to work in this field, in collaboration with other organisations.

On 14 March 2024, Minister Halbi admitted that after significant power outages in June and October 2023, government agencies' business continuity plans (BCPs) had holes. The minister outlined the Department of Electrical Services' (DES) plans to boost capacity and enhance reliability on 14 March 2024, at the LegCo budget presentation. The Bukit Panggal power station's output will be increased by 2027, and mobile generators will be added for emergency situations. Due to a malfunctioning 66kV transmission line, there was a blackout in 2023 that affected several districts and had a major negative impact on the health of people who needed oxygen therapy as well as the availability of water. DES recognised the shortcomings in its business continuity strategy and proceeded to activate a plan that included emergency preparedness and portable generators. In order to lessen future interruptions, efforts are being made to update equipment and unify the project with additional government departments.

The 20th LegCo session adopted the Supply Bill 2024/2025, which allocates $6.25 billion effective 1 April, on 21 March 2024, in accordance with Section 4(2) of the Development Fund Act and Clause 7, Article 83 of the Constitution. The budget and development expenses of the Ministry of Transport and Infocommunications (MTIC) were also discussed during the session. In response to Rosmawatty's worries over patient confidentiality, Minister Mohammad Isham stressed that only appropriate healthcare workers have access to medical records and that the BruHIMS System provides an audit trail to monitor access.

On 24 March 2024, it was evident how it had affected the country's development and governance. The council answered more than 700 questions in 18 days, demonstrating its careful approach to determining the future of the country. Rosmawatty emphasised the necessity of making major strides in the areas of food independence, tourism, and the security of water and energy. She also stressed the significance of empowering youth, improving education, and drawing in high-caliber international investments. She also pushed for the formation of a special task force to promote job creation and harmonise with Wawasan Brunei 2035 goals, advocating for a culture shift towards open communication and accountability.

Rosmawatty gave the keynote talk at the Brunei Mampan Forum, which was part of the Brunei Mid-Year Conference and Exhibition (MYCE) 2024, at the Senate Room, Chancellor Hall, Universiti Brunei Darussalam (UBD). The Prime Minister's Office and the School of Business and Economics at UBD arranged the forum, which has as its main topic Sustainable Development Goals (SDG) 12: Sustainable Consumption and Production. For a sustainable future, she highlighted the significance of creative thinking, ethical consumption, and cross-sector collaboration. She urged cooperation in efforts to attain sustainability in Brunei and stressed the role LegCo members play in furthering SDGs.

== Awards and recognitions ==
Rosmawatty gained recognition for her outstanding accomplishments at the Asia Inc Forum's Women Achievers Awards Ceremony, one of eight local female leaders to do so, the award was presented by Princess Masna on 19 August 2008, during the Women in Business Forum.

- Inspire's The 50 Most Influential Women in Brunei (2014)
- Asia Inc Forum's Women Achievers Awards (2008)
