= Huraini Hurairah =

Bruneian civil servant

Datin Paduka Dr. Hajah Huraini Hurairah
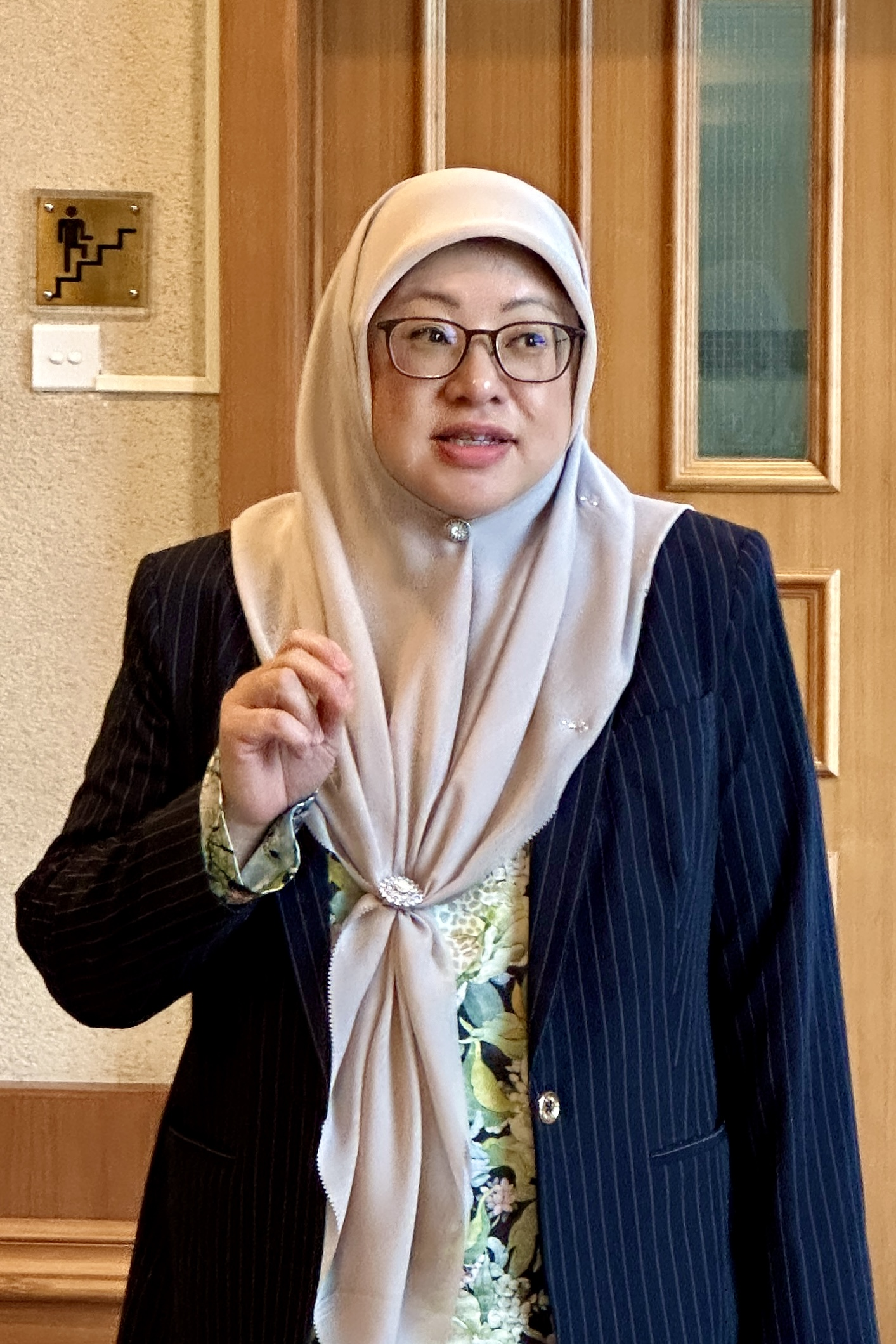
- Huraini Hurairah in 2024

Clerk to the Legislative Council of Brunei Darussalam
- Incumbent
- Assumed office 9 January 2024
- Preceded by: Judin Asar

Clerk to the Privy Council
- Incumbent
- Assumed office 9 January 2024

Secretary to the Council of Cabinet Ministers
- Incumbent
- Assumed office 9 January 2024

Personal details
- Born: Brunei
- Education: University of Oxford; Institute of Development Studies, University of Sussex
- Occupation: Civil servant
- Profession: Public administrator
- Awards: DPMB (2025)

Huraini Hurairah is a Bruneian aristocrat and civil servant. She coordinated the National Vision known as Wawasan Brunei 2035 and she later served as the Clerk of the Legislative Council of Brunei (LegCo) from 2024.

== Early life and education ==
Her father was Pehin Orang Kaya Setia Jaya Dato Paduka Haji Abu Hurairah, her grandfather was a former civil servant, diplomat and clerk of the legislative council, Pg Dipa Negara Laila Diraja and her uncle is the diplomat Alaihuddin Taha. In 1999 she was working at the Ministry of Education with children with special needs. She has a doctorate from the University of Oxford.

== Career ==
In 2015 she moved to the Prime Minister's office where she coordinated the National Vision known as Wawasan Brunei 2035. This vision includes progress on the UN's Sustainable Development Goals. In 2022 she was in Bangkok presenting this vision at a UN-ESCAP meeting.

Huraini succeeded Judin Asar as the clerk of the Legislative Council of Brunei on 9 January 2024. That month she received her first visit by the AIPA secretariat's Hon. Pehin Dato Adanan Yussof, who is the chair of that organisation.

In May 2025 Brunei was being welcomed as the last Asian parliament to align itself with the Inter-Parliamentary Union. Less than 12% of Brunei's parliamentary members at that time were women. Hurairah's position as a woman leader as secretary-general in Brunei was noted.
