= Abdul Aziz Hamdan =

Bruneian youth advocate and politician

Yang Berhormat Abdul Aziz Hamdan
- عبدالعزيز همدان
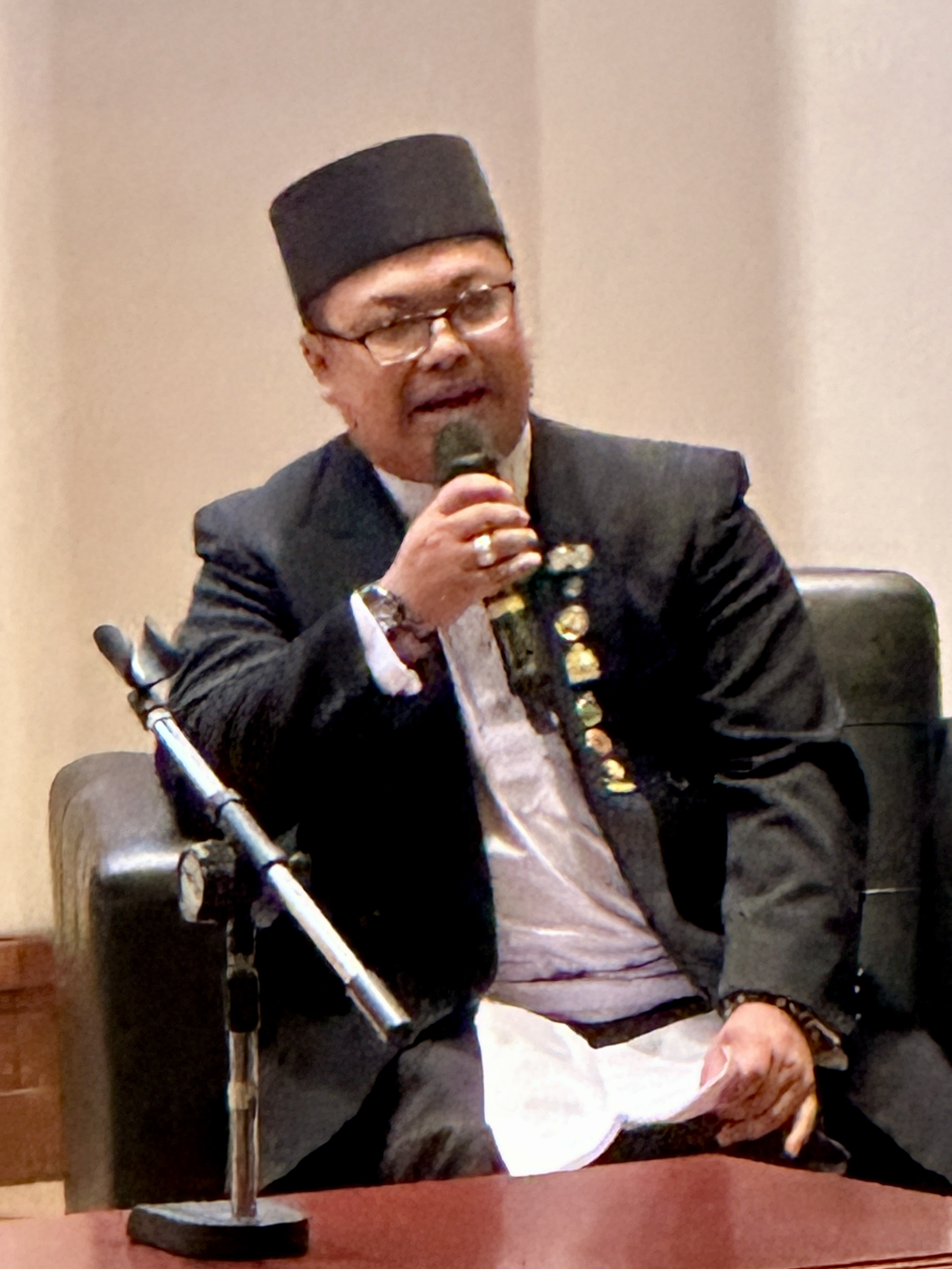
- Abdul Aziz in 2024

Member of the Legislative Council
- In office 20 January 2023
- Monarch: Hassanal Bolkiah

Personal details
- Born: 1985/1986 (age 40–41) Sengkarai, Tutong, Brunei
- Occupation: Youth advocate; community worker; politician

Abdul Aziz bin Haji Hamdan (born 1985/1986) is a Bruneian youth advocate, community worker and politician who was among the members of Brunei's Legislative Council (LegCo) appointed in 2023. He is also the advisor of IMPAK Youth Movement, Tutong Youth Leader, and ketua kampung of Kampong Sengkarai. He is involved, and contributes, in a number of areas including volunteer work, society, culture, tourism, and business.

== Advocacy and community work ==
Abdul Aziz began his leadership career at grassroots level, driven by a strong desire to support the youth, especially in his hometown. He is also active in the Tutong District Development and Creative Body and the Tutong IMPAK Group. His dedication to mentoring the youth in Tutong and surrounding regions reflects his belief in their potential as future leaders.

He created the highly sought-after Tutong Flames (chili sauce), registered as One Village One Product (1K1P) Kampong Sengkarai, and is involved in various areas which includes entrepreneurship, community service, and cultural activities. Abdul Aziz has held leadership roles in numerous senior and working committees, including chairman of the executive administrative committee for the royal birthday celebration.

In a number of shared activities, including the Tutong Regional MPK Munajat Night, the Munajat Tutong Care Night, and the Munajat Night Program, he serves as the Brunei Youth Council's Tutong Youth Leader. Over ten youth associations and groups have participated in the advocacy efforts for over fifty times, involving about one thousand young people nationwide. He has organised over 50 programs, such as religious gatherings to combat the COVID-19 pandemic, engaging approximately 1,000 youth nationwide.

Abdul Aziz led the Wear Mask Initiative, educating the public on the importance of face coverings, with 50 young participants distributing masks to nearly 1,500 people. As chief youth coordinator for the Tutong Care Program, he provided over 4,500 meal packs, 500 dry food boxes, and 180,000 face covers to support frontline workers in Tutong District. His leadership, driven by a strong commitment to youth development, has guided the young people of Tutong District across various disciplines.

Tuak apparel is a treasured tradition that has to be conserved for future generations, especially the wedding gowns worn by the Tutong tribe. Abdul Aziz emphasised the value of preserving and dressing in Tutong wedding attire for many occasions. In an ongoing effort to popularise this traditional dress, young people are being encouraged to use it at weddings, school functions, visits, and National Day.

== Political career ==
On 20 January 2023, Sultan Hassanal Bolkiah selected him as one among the distinct individuals to the LegCo. On 28 January, the Department of Councils' Dewan Persidangan hosted the swearing-In ceremony for the newly appointed LegCo members.

=== 19th LegCo session ===
In their motion of gratitude on 4 March 2023, District Representatives emphasised a number of important issues, such as the Bangar Town Tourism Development Plan and the significance of providing guidance to young people. Abdul Aziz underlined the necessity of continual efforts to create an environment that is supportive of the young, as they are crucial to the country's progress in all spheres.

The Ministry of Education (MoE) will keep up its efforts to hire instructors for kids with special needs, including through an apprenticeship program, Minister Romaizah stated on 14 March 2023. The minister mentioned that the Sultan Hassanal Bolkiah Institute of Education (SHBIE) at Universiti Brunei Darussalam offers a Master of Teaching program with a specialisation in special education, which will direct interested teachers into the field in response to Abdul Aziz's question about increasing the number of special education teachers. In addition, the Special Education Department has designated 45 instructors under the G1 category. There are continuous efforts to educate and recruit additional teachers through partnerships with UBD and the Brunei Darussalam Leadership and Teacher Academy (BDLTA).

In order to guarantee the timely execution of national development plans (RKN), Abdul Aziz suggested in his motion of thanks on 27 March 2023, that all government workers adopt a professional attitude to their employment, notably in decision-making and policy creation. High degrees of professionalism, he underlined, would provide a favourable impression on the general people, boosting trust in the government's ability to provide services and advancing Wawasan Brunei 2035's objectives. In addition, he addressed the significance of fostering professionalism in all government agencies, stressing that while cultural change takes consistent work and dedication, employees must be imaginative, inventive, and proactive in advancing their expertise.

Launched on 8 July 2023, by Akademi Panggung Sri Utama Enterprise, an anthology of poetry from Brunei and Nepal was produced in association with ten local and ten Nepalese poets. There are twenty-four poems in the book in Nepali, English, and Malay. The goal of the launch, which took place at RPN Lambak Kanan and was presided over by Abdul Aziz, is to strengthen the literary bonds between poets in the two nations.

=== 20th LegCo session ===
Abdul Aziz underlined the significance of teamwork to support the Sultan's initiatives in a motion of thanks during the 20th session of the LegCo meeting on 28 February 2024, particularly in terms of creating jobs, expanding economic sectors, and developing human capacity among local entrepreneurs. He emphasized the necessity for national and whole-of-government strategies and pushed for closer ties between the business community and non-governmental groups. In addition, Abdul Aziz emphasized the crucial role that youth play in turning climate challenges into opportunities. He advocated for more initiatives and incentives to support youth involvement in small and medium-sized businesses and proposed studies into the elements that contribute to the success of young, local entrepreneurs in this field.

The digital transformation strategy in education is still in its early stages, according to Minister Romaizah, who made this statement during a meeting on 13 March 2024. She said that the projects' efficacy will be regularly monitored and evaluated by MoE through the technological education center. In addition, in answer to a question from Abdul Aziz on the impacts of initiatives like blended learning and smart classrooms on pupils, the Department of Planning, Development, and Research will carry out studies to assess the outcomes of these programs.

The problem Abdul Aziz brought up on 16 March 2024, regarding the meeting's live broadcast, caught the attention of the council members. In response, Minister Halbi stated that it is adequate to bring important issues, especially those with a large public impact, for discussion in the LegCo. He emphasised that the public may monitor debates at their leisure thanks to the present television broadcast system, which includes rebroadcasts, and that the council's website also provides updates on the sessions.

Abdul Aziz brought up concerns regarding pollution and environmental issues connected to sand mining in coastal regions during the meeting on 18 March 2024, which Minister Muhammad Juanda addressed. He said that in order to safeguard the nation's environment, the Ministry of Development has put policies and procedures into place. The minister also presented ideas for improving infrastructure, including the creation of government buildings, residential communities, and commercial zones.

Abdul Aziz and Pehin Abdul Rahman brought up concerns about the Ministry of Culture, Youth, and Sports (MCYS) on 19 March 2024. They concentrated on initiatives to improve platforms for young people with potential. Minister Nazmi responded by outlining plans to transform the Language and Literature Bureau Library in Bandar Seri Begawan and the old Radio Television Brunei (RTB) headquarters into a Creative Culture Industry and Community Library Hub under the RKN 12. This program is a component of a larger endeavor to create a Brunei Culture Academy, which intends to upgrade facilities and encourage young people in the nation to pursue dynamic and innovative arts.

== Awards and recognitions ==
Throughout his career, he has earned the following awards and recognitions:

- Youth Leader Award (9 August 2022)
