= Zulkarnain Hanafi =

Bruneian surgeon

Dato Seri Setia Zulkarnain Hanafi PSNB DPMB PIKB
- ذو القرنين حنفي
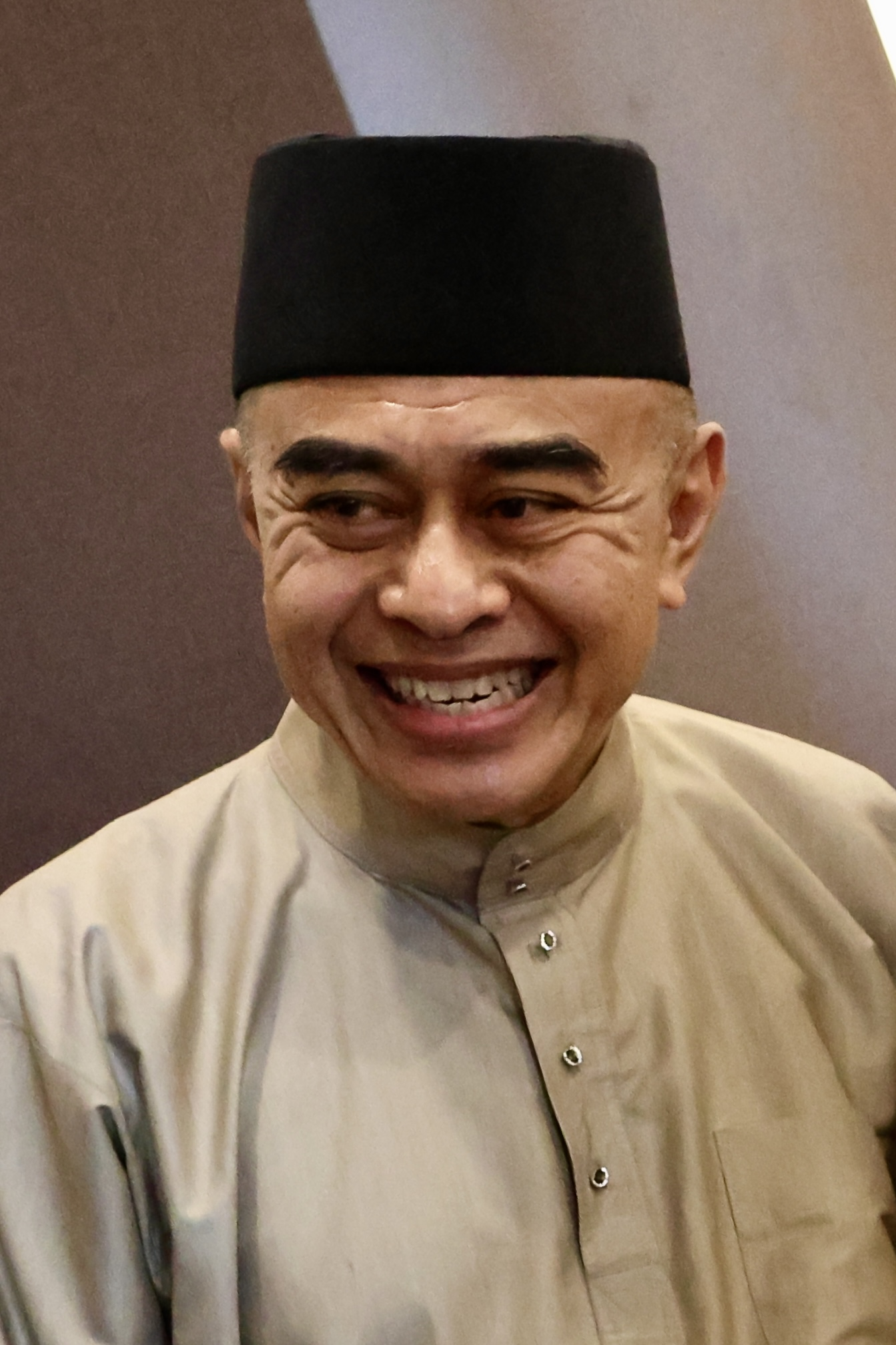
- Zulkarnain in 2024

6th Minister of Health
- In office 21 October 2015 – 1 December 2017
- Monarch: Hassanal Bolkiah
- Preceded by: Adanan Yusof
- Succeeded by: Isham Jaafar

Personal details
- Born: Brunei
- Spouse: Sarimah Umar
- Education: University of Liverpool (MBChB)
- Occupation: Surgeon

Zulkarnain bin Haji Hanafi is the former Minister of Health in Brunei from 2015 until 2017 and a Vice-Chancellor at the Universiti Brunei Darussalam (UBD) from 2008 to 2015.

== Early life and education ==
Zulkarnain went for his higher education in the United Kingdom. He obtained his Bachelor of Medicine, Bachelor of Surgery from the University of Liverpool and later the FRCSEd (Otolaryngology) from the Royal College of Surgeons of Edinburgh. Lastly, FRCGP (Hons) from the Royal College of General Practitioners.

== Career ==
Zulkarnain was a head and neck surgeon and otolaryngologist, who in 2001 was involved in the first cochlear implant surgery on a child in Borneo at, Raja Isteri Pengiran Anak Saleha Hospital.

During the 2015 Bruneian cabinet reshuffle on 22 October, Zulkarnain was sworn in as the minister of health.

For the 2017–18 fiscal year, Zulkarnain's ministry received a budget of B$323.88 million, including $7.77 million for development. Emphasising shared responsibility for health, he proposed consolidating health centres, improving emergency services, and securing international accreditations. To tackle rising non-communicable diseases and obesity, initiatives like Bandarku Ceria promoted active lifestyles, and excise taxes were introduced on unhealthy foods. Collaborating with the Ministry of Education, his ministry implemented school health initiatives, including hygiene campaigns and a traffic light system for healthier canteen food. He also stressed the need for safe alternative medicine, addressing risks from unregulated treatments.

On 1 December 2017, Zulkarnain was dismissed as minister of health in a minor cabinet reshuffle, the first since 2015, and was succeeded by Isham Jaafar, who was sworn in at the palace on 4 December.

== Honours ==
Zulkarnain has earned the following honours:

- Order of Setia Negara Brunei First Class (PSNB; 15 July 2016) – Dato Seri Setia
- Order of Seri Paduka Mahkota Brunei Second Class (DPMB; 15 July 2011) – Dato Paduka
- Excellent Service Medal (PIKB)
- National Day Silver Jubilee Medal (23 February 2009)

== See also ==
- Cabinet of Brunei
- Health in Brunei

Political offices
Preceded by Adanan Yusof	6th Minister of Health; 21 October 2015 – 1 December 2017	Succeeded by Isham Jaafar
Academic offices
Preceded by Ismail Duraman	Vice-Chancellor of Universiti Brunei Darussalam; 2008–2015	Succeeded by Anita Binurul Zahrina
