= Kampong Sengkarai =

Village in Brunei

Kampong Sengkarai Kampung Sengkarai
- Village
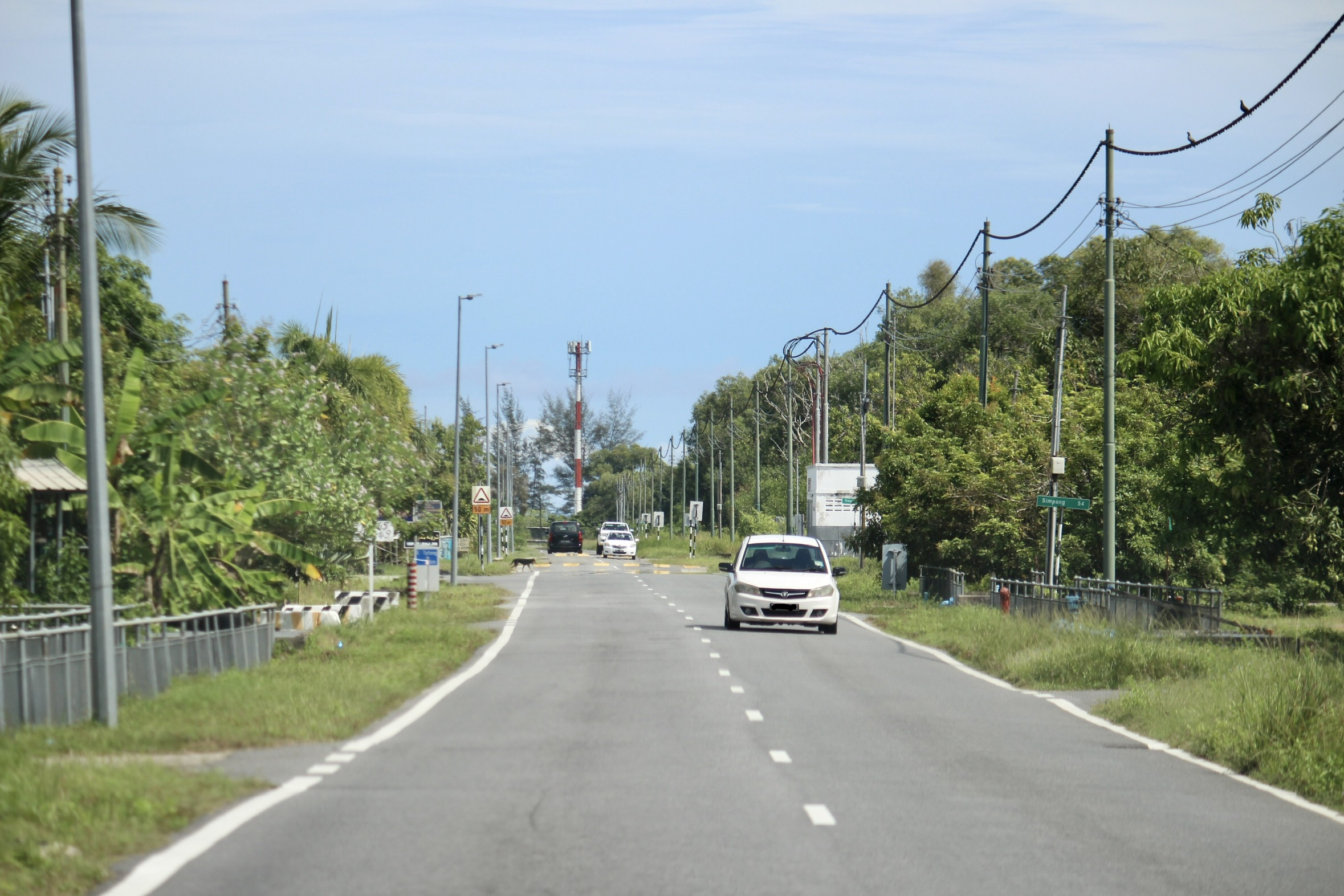
- Jalan Kuala Tutong

- Location in Brunei
- Coordinates: 4°48′18″N 114°38′46″E
- Country: Brunei
- District: Tutong
- Mukim: Pekan Tutong

Government
  - Village head: Abdul Aziz Hamdan

Population (2021)
  - Total: 1,694
- Time zone: UTC+8 (BNT)
- Postcode: TA2341

Kampong Sengkarai (Malay: Kampung Sengkarai) is a village located in the Tutong District of Brunei, within the mukim of Pekan Tutong. With a postcode of TA2341, the village is situated approximately 2 kilometres (1.2 mi) from the town of Tutong. As of 2021, the population of the village was 1,694, comprising Tutong, Brunei Malay, and other ethnic groups.

== Etymology ==
According to oral history, the village's name is said to come from a large boat built by the villagers in ancient times. The story dates back to the late 1800s when a series of ayau (raids) threatened the safety of Kampong Sengkarai's residents. To escape these dangers, the villagers convened a meeting and unanimously decided to construct an enormous boat, approximately 4–5 chains (260–330 ft; 80–101 m) in length.

During its construction, three binjai trees were planted to mark the length of the boat. The trees were positioned at both ends and the centre of the boat. After months of effort, the boat was finally completed, and it was time to lower it into the river. Despite the collective strength of over 100 villagers attempting to move the boat, it did not budge. A bomoh (shaman) present at the time performed a ritual and cast a spell on the boat. Following the ritual, the villagers successfully moved and launched the boat into the river with ease. The boat was named Sang Garai, after a fearsome and powerful mythical creature that inspired both awe and terror at the time. The figure of Sang Garai was carved at the bow of the boat to intimidate enemies during the frequent ayau raids. To honour the boat, the villagers named their settlement Kampong Sang Garai, which eventually evolved into its current name, Kampong Sengkarai.

An alternative story suggests that the name originates from a riverbank where villagers conducted trade and transported goods. This place was called Garai. A prominent trader named Sang, known for his wares, operated there. Over time, the villagers began referring to the place by combining Sang's name with Garai, resulting in the name Sang Garai for simplicity.

Another version of the tale associates the name Sang Garai with an individual who lived near the river now known as Sungai Sengkarai. This person, identified only as Sang Garai, remains a mysterious figure whose life and origins are largely unknown.

== History ==
Most of the early residents of Kampong Sengkarai originally came from Kampong Kandang in Kampong Serambangun. They relocated to Kampong Sengkarai when a cholera outbreak struck their original village. Development in Sengkarai began in the 1940s.

== Administration ==
The first village head of Kampong Sengkarai was Pengiran Radin bin Pengiran Dipa Negara Pengiran Jaya, who served from 1940 until his passing in May 1964. He was succeeded by Haji Badaruddin bin Seluddin, who held the position from 3 July 1965 to 23 September 1994. On 30 October 1994, Awang Haji Mohamad bin Seruddin briefly assumed the role of village head for about five months. A new village head, Haji Jaya bin Haji Ratu, was appointed on 1 April 1997 and has been serving as the fourth village head of Kampong Sengkarai since then.

== Infrastructure ==
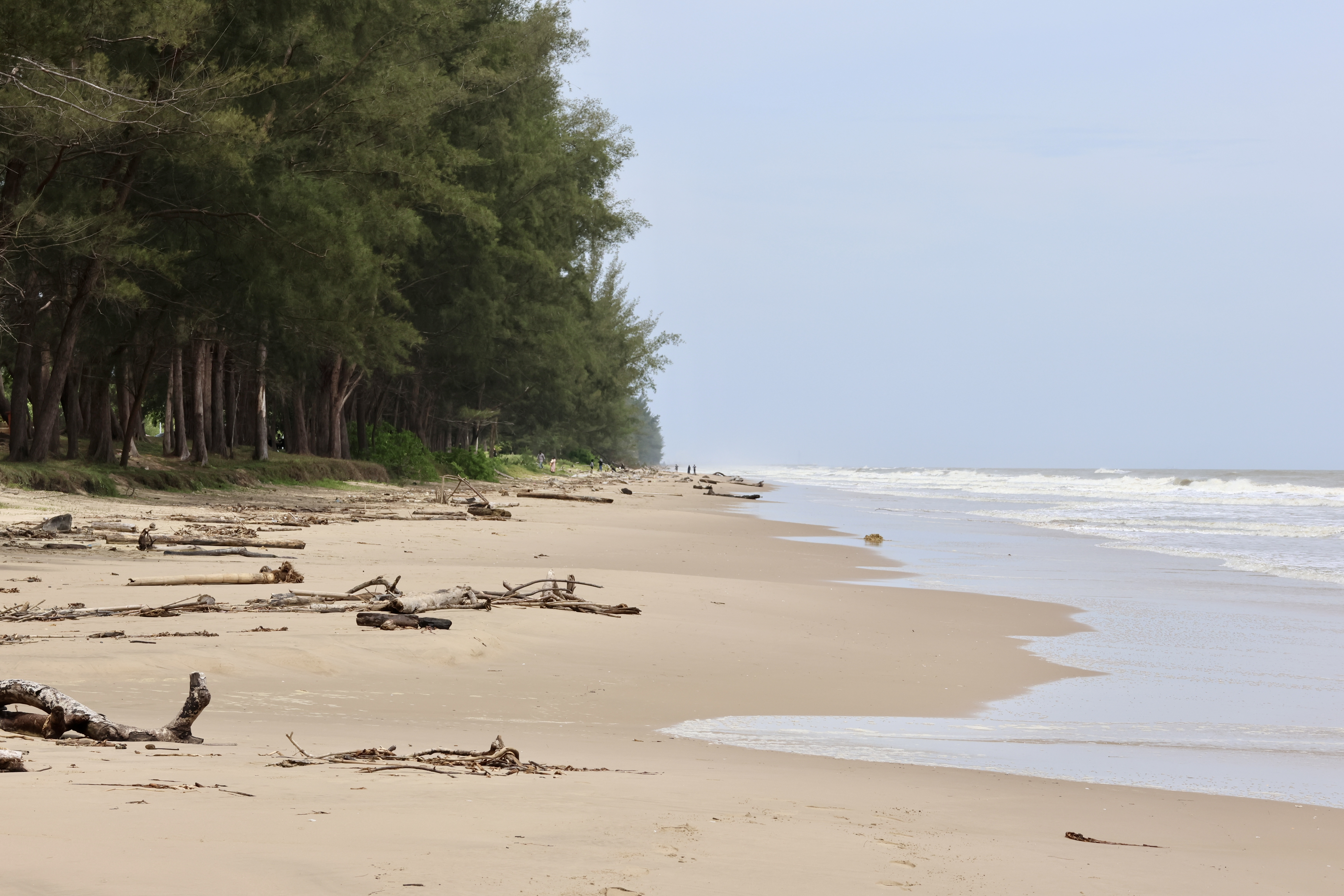
Seri Kenangan Beach

As of 2002, the village features 226 private houses, 30 government houses, a government guesthouse, 28 flats, three labourers' houses, three shop houses, three sawmills, a playground, a recreational park at Seri Kenangan Beach, a market (tamu), two blocks of commercial buildings, a cooperative shop, and seven eateries. The villagers are also actively involved in community activities, with the establishment of an organisation named Persatuan Melayu Sengkarai, Tutong.

The Istana Pantai is one of the historical landmarks in Kampong Sengkarai, located in the area of Seri Kenangan Beach. This palace was built by Sultan Omar Ali Saifuddien III for the royal family to rest during visits to the Tutong District. The palace features five bedrooms, two bathrooms, a reading room, a guest room, a dining room, and a kitchen.

=== Education ===
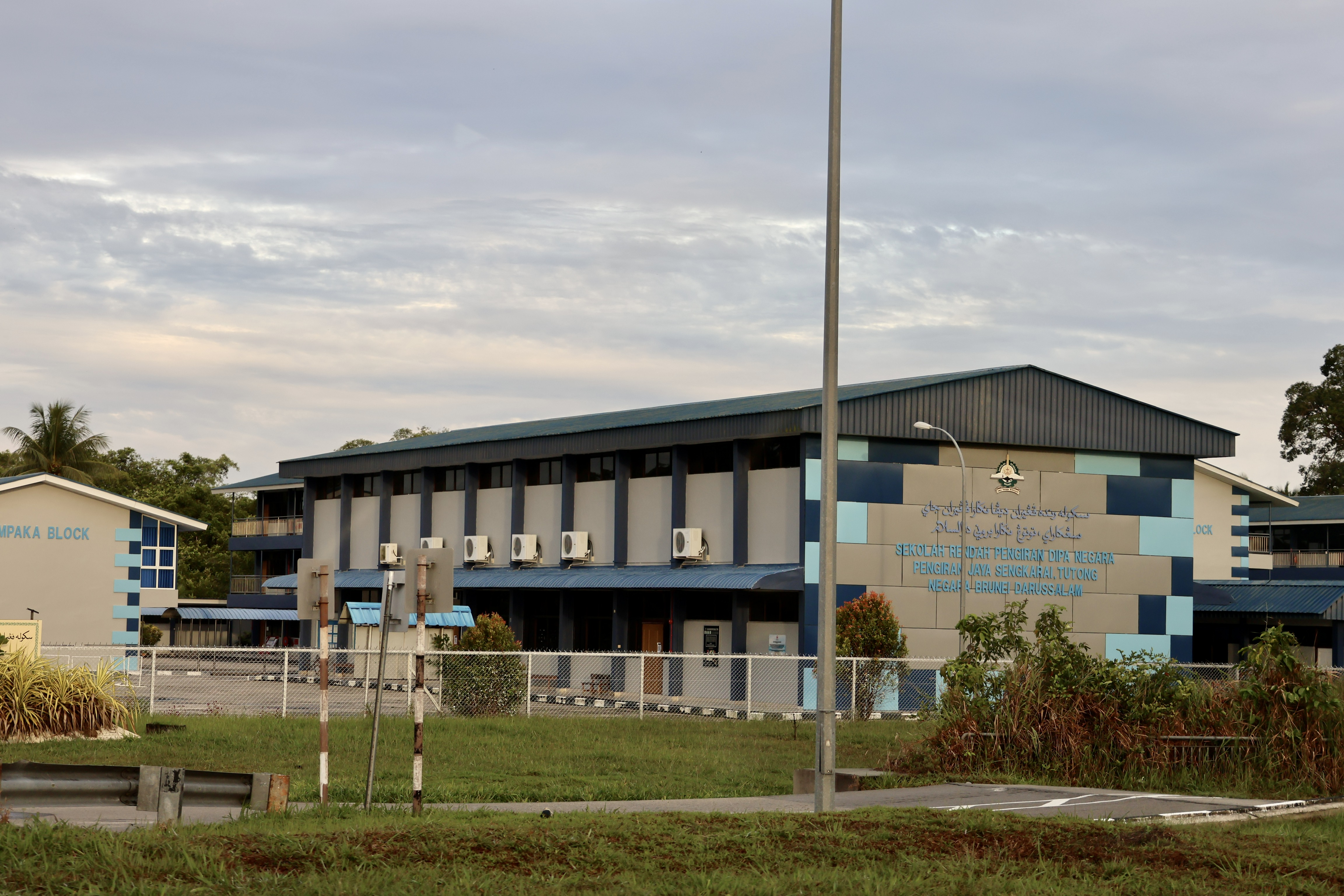
Pengiran Dipa Negara Pengiran Jaya Primary School

Pengiran Dipa Negara Pengiran Jaya Primary School was initially established as a temporary structure built through community efforts led by Badarudin bin Serudin, the then village head. The original building, constructed on government land, featured basic materials such as round timber columns, wooden walls, and a zinc roof. The school began operations on 17 March 1968 with over 60 students, primarily from Kampong Sengkarai and Kampong Petani, who previously attended Muda Hashim Malay School. As enrolment increased, the government funded the construction of a permanent school building on 11.7 acres (4.7 ha), completed on 1 March 1981. The new facility includes offices, specialised rooms such as a computer lab, a special education room, a multipurpose hall, and well-equipped classrooms. As of 2002, the school has 24 teachers and 239 students, supported by a dedicated staff team and a student prefect body to ensure a harmonious and productive learning environment.

=== Religion ===
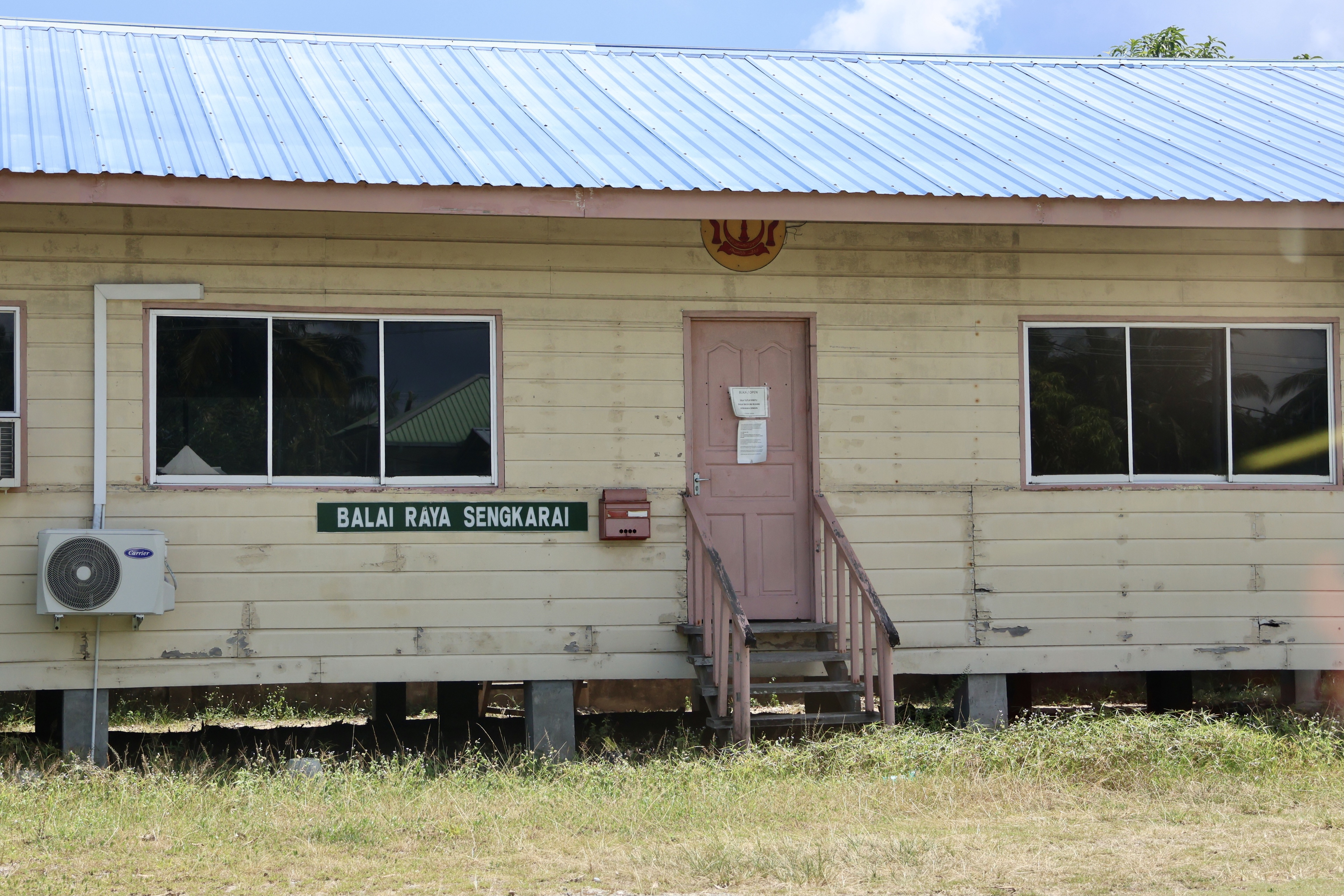
The village community hall

The first surau in Kampong Sengkarai was built in the 1950s during the tenure of the first village head, Pengiran Radin bin Pengiran Dipa Negara Pengiran Jaya. He constructed the surau on his own land through a gotong-royong effort by the villagers. After his passing, the surau continued to be used for several years until a new surau was constructed in 1981. The proposal for the new surau was initiated by the village head at the time, Haji Badaruddin bin Seluddin, who suggested relocating it to Temporary Occupation Licence land near the balai raya (community hall). The villagers approved the proposal and formed a construction committee, which sought government permission to collect public donations for funding.

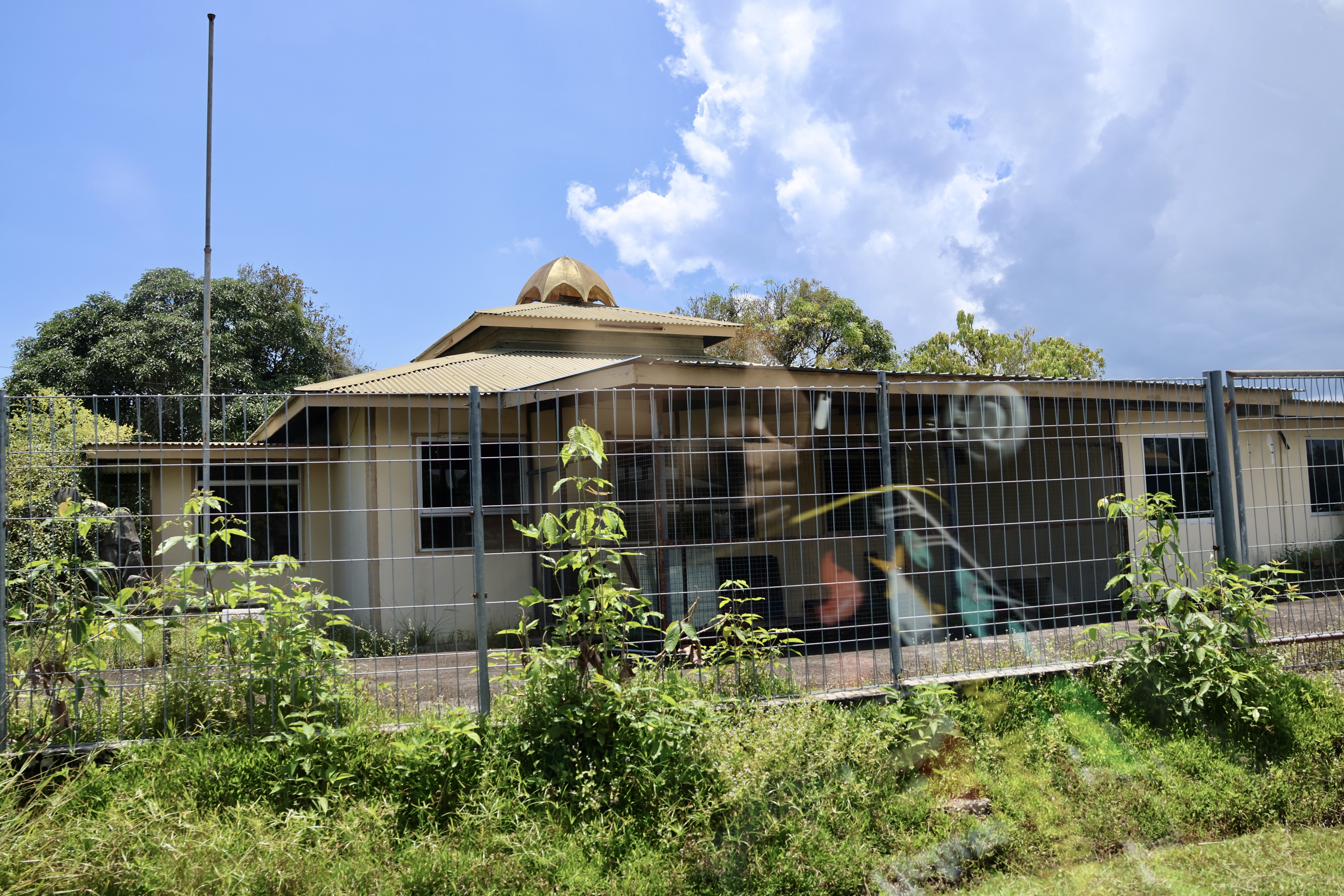
The village surau

In 1980, a donation drive was conducted, and construction began in March 1981. By June 1981, the new surau was completed and opened for use, costing B$28,000. Initially, the building measured 40 by 45 feet (12 m × 14 m), but as the number of congregants grew, it became necessary to expand. With permission from the Department of Sharia Affairs (now the Department of Mosque Affairs), an additional 40 by 30 feet (12.2 m × 9.1 m) was added to the surau. Further improvements were made, including the construction of a new kitchen and toilets in 1991 and a roof replacement in 1992, funded by the Department of Sharia Affairs.

The surau can now accommodate 450 worshippers, though parking space is limited to just over 60 vehicles. It is equipped with facilities such as a prayer hall, fax services, and seven computers used by local schoolchildren for learning. Since its construction, the surau initially lacked a permanent mosque officer, with communal prayers led by acting imam Haji Hanifah bin Haji Alus, a religious teacher. In 1996, the Department of Mosque Affairs appointed Aidil Sufian bin Haji Mohd. Yassin as imam, while Haji Ibrahim bin Badar served as the acting muezzin. The surau now has a permanent muezzin, Mohamad Shahirwandy bin Samsudin, who previously served at Kampong Penabai Mosque in Tutong.

The surau has organised religious activities such as nightly tadarus sessions, Quran completion ceremonies, memorial prayers, and celebrations of Islamic and national events. Other programmes, including religious study circles, lectures, forums, competitions, and training courses, are also regularly held. Due to its well-organised and successful programmes, the surau won the Mosque Takmir Award in the surau and prayer hall category in 1996 and 2000. Its achievements have served as an example for other suraus and prayer halls to remain active in engaging their communities.

Pengiran Anak Haji Mohamed Alam Mosque is the village mosque; it was inaugurated on 7 April 2017 by Sultan Hassanal Bolkiah and can accommodate 1000 worshippers.

== Notable people ==
- Pengiran Muhammad Yusuf (1923–2016), diplomat, politician and writer.
- Abdul Aziz Hamdan, youth advocate and politician
