= Isham Jaafar =

Bruneian physician (born 1956)

Yang Berhormat Dato Seri Setia Isham Jaafar PSNB DPMB
- اشعام جعفر
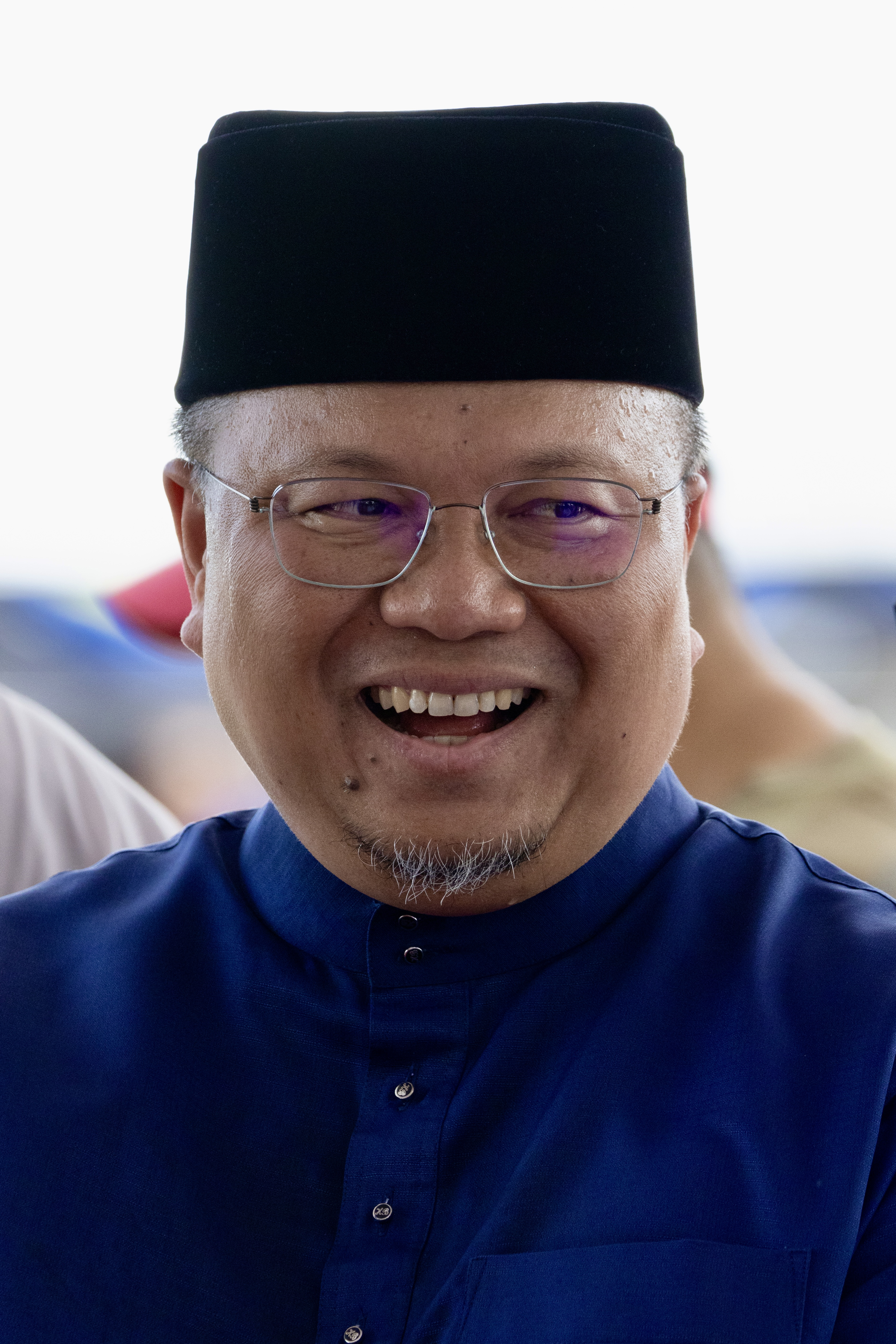
- Jaafar in 2024

7th Minister of Health
- Incumbent
- Assumed office 1 December 2017
- Monarch: Hassanal Bolkiah
- Preceded by: Zulkarnain Hanafi

Personal details
- Born: Mohammad Isham bin Jaafar; 22 June 1956 (age 70) Brunei
- Spouse: Noraslinah Ramlee
- Education: University of Dundee (MBChB)
- Profession: Cardiothoracic surgeon

Mohammad Isham bin Jaafar (born 22 June 1956) is a Bruneian physician and politician who has served as the Brunei government's Minister of Health since 2017.

== Early life and education ==
Isham was born on 22 June 1956. He earned his Bachelor of Medicine, Bachelor of Surgery (MBChB) degree from the University of Dundee in 1995. He completed specialist training in cardiothoracic surgery at Institut Jantung Negara (IJN), Malaysia, and a fellowship at Royal Papworth Hospital, Cambridge.

In 2014, he was awarded fellowships by the Royal College of Physicians of Edinburgh, the American College of Cardiology, and the ASEAN Cardiology Congress, and in 2015, by the Royal College of Surgeons of Edinburgh and the European Society of Cardiology.

== Medical career ==
In 2005, Isham became the consultant cardiothoracic surgeon at the Cardiac Centre, Jerudong Park Medical Centre (JPMC), and Gleneagles. In November 2009, he was appointed Chairman of the Board at JPMC and the executive director of Pantai Jerudong Specialist Centre (PJSC).

In 2014, the laboratories at JPMC and PJSC were accredited by the Joint Commission International (JCI) and the International Standardization Organization (ISO), respectively.

On 1 December 2017, Isham was appointed the Minister of Health, replacing Zulkarnain Hanafi.

Isham retained his position in the 2018 Bruneian cabinet reshuffle, which replaced six ministers. He was again retained following the 2022 cabinet reshuffle. On 11 November, a surgical team led by Isham installed an LVAD under the supervision of Jaap Lahpor of the Netherlands, a leading expert in the installation of mechanical cardiac devices.

=== MOH Intelligence Hub ===
At the EVYD Campus in Jerudong, the MOH and Singapore-based EVYD Technology officially opened the MOH Intelligence Hub. The ministry reported wanting to aggressively use technology to advance Brunei's healthcare ecosystem's digital optimization. Isham stated:

MOH Intelligence Hub in EVYD Campus demonstrates the strategic relationship among healthcare technology, data analytics, research and policy planning. It will function as a sandbox for collaboration, knowledge generation, and practice transformation. The Hub will provide a co-working space for different teams dealing with data and intelligence. Facilitating these enhanced interactions all in one location will provide Brunei with more value-added insights to craft data-driven decisions around population health with greater confidence.

— Dato Seri Setia Dr Haji Mohammad Isham bin Haji Jaafar, BioSpectrum

== Views ==
On 25 & 26 August 2022, he delivered a speech at the 12th Asia-Pacific Economic Cooperation (APEC) on Health and the Economy meeting in Bangkok. He has emphasized the necessity for continuous monitoring based on transparency and the use of digital technology to link information throughout the world, as well as for assessing, modernizing, and reforming the global health security system.

According to Isham, the future health budget would increase as a result of the rising price of prescription drugs and medical care, an increase in the number of patients, and the prevalence of non-communicable diseases. Speaking before the Legislative Council, he suggested a $418 million health budget for the fiscal year 2023–24, an increase of 8.3% over the amount allotted the year before. The government reported that chronic health problems, including diabetes, malignancies, and heart disease, remain on the rise.

During a discussion meeting with the MoH's leadership on 21 July 2024, Isham urged students majoring in medicine, dentistry, and similar health fields to pursue extracurricular activities while pursuing their medical degrees. According to him, the necessity for other sectors like information technology and artificial intelligence is growing as medical services expand. In addition, he urged students to become members of non-governmental organizations (NGOs), even if they have nothing to do with health.

== Initiatives ==
At the 7th Annual Scientific Meeting of the Cardiac Society of Brunei Darussalam, Isham stated that overall, cardiovascular disease-related premature mortality rose from 20% in 2013 to 26% in 2018. According to him, it is crucial to consider fresh approaches to providing healthcare in this new normal brought on by the epidemic. In addition, the minister stated that in light of the present pandemic of non-communicable illnesses, they must consider using the recent lessons in digital health for the treatment of non-communicable diseases such as cardiovascular disease.

Isham paid a visit to the School of Public Health NUS on 8 February 2023 as part of follow-up conversations following the signing of a Memorandum of Understanding (MoU). He was joined by members of the Brunei High Commission as well as his wife, Norsurainah binti Haji Ramlee.

== Personal life ==
Isham is married to Noraslinah Haji Ramlee.

== Honours ==
- Order of Setia Negara Brunei First Class (PSNB; 15 July 2018) – Dato Seri Setia
- Order of Seri Paduka Mahkota Brunei Second Class (DPMB; 2011) – Dato Paduka

Political offices
Preceded by Zulkarnain Hanafi	7th Minister of Health; 1 December 2017 – present	Succeeded by Incumbent
