= Ministry of Health (Brunei) =

Government ministry of Brunei

- Kementerian Kesihatan
- National emblem of Brunei

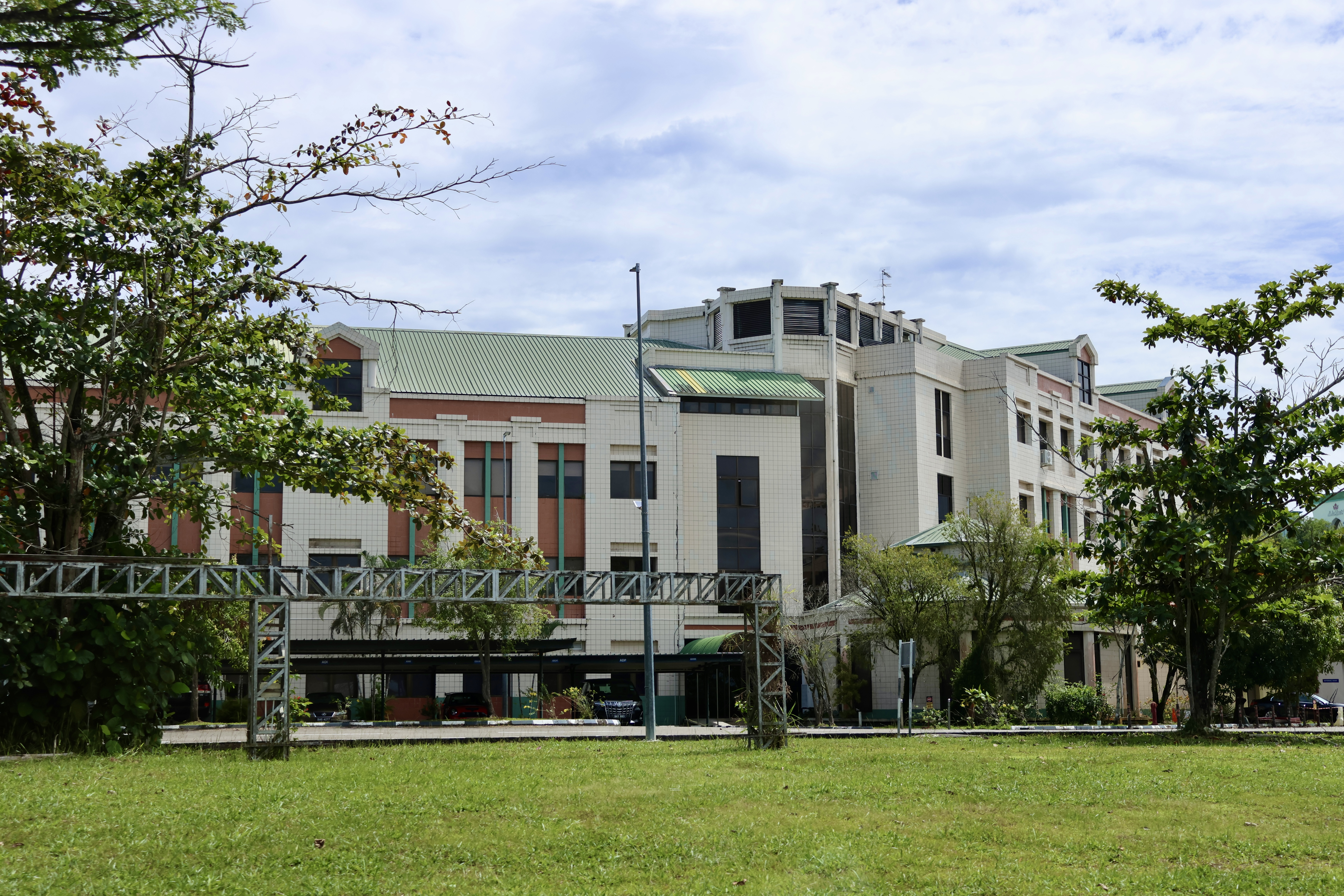
- The headquarters in 2025

Ministry overview
- Formed: 1 January 1984
- Jurisdiction: Government of Brunei
- Headquarters: Bandar Seri Begawan, Brunei; 4°55′15″N 114°56′42″E
- Employees: 5,958 (2024)
- Annual budget: ▲$392 million BND (2022)
- Minister responsible: Mohd Isham Jaafar (Note: His current official Malay name is Dato Seri Setia Dr. Awang Haji Md. Isham bin Haji Jaafar.), Minister
- Website: www.moh.gov.bn

The Ministry of Health (MoH; Malay: Kementerian Kesihatan) is a cabinet-level ministry in the government of Brunei which oversees the health system in the country. It is currently led by a minister and the incumbent is Mohd Isham Jaafar, who took office since 1 December 2017. The ministry is headquartered in Bandar Seri Begawan.

== History ==
One physician from Europe was engaged by the medical service in 1939. In the reports that are available, no other doctors are named. Moreover, one student midwife and three midwives. As of 1949, an officer of the Malayan Medical Service, which has its headquarters in Brunei Town, is in charge of overseeing medical and health management throughout the nation. Early in 1965, the Brunei Medical and Health Department launched the region's first government "flying doctor service," continuing a British Army practice of delivering medical care to rural residents.

== Responsibilities ==
The ministry oversees four government hospitals and 60 health centres and clinics nationwide. (Note: as of 2019)

As of 2017, the ministry has been responsible in enforcing 11 legislations related to public health, healthcare professionals (including dentists, midwives, nurses and pharmacists), infectious diseases, medicines, mental health, poison, and tobacco.

The ministry manages the Brunei Healthcare Information Management System, commonly known as Bru-HIMS, (Note: also spelt BruHIMS) the national electronic patient record system. It was introduced on 11 September 2012.

The ministry also manages BruHealth, the national personal health record smartphone app which is integrated with Bru-HIMS. It was introduced on 14 May 2020, initially as the national COVID-19 contact tracing app. Access to personal medical records was eventually introduced in the app in September in the same year.

The ministry is playing a key role in handling the spread of COVID-19 in the country.

== Budget ==
In the fiscal year 2022–23, the ministry has been allocated a budget of B$392 million, (Note: ≈US$282 million as of July 2022) a 1.2 percent increase from the previous year.

== List of ministers ==
=== Ministers ===
Symbols

Acting minister

| No. | Portrait | Minister | Term start | Term end | Time in office | Monarch | Ref. |
|---|---|---|---|---|---|---|---|
| 1 | | Abdul Aziz Umar | 1 January 1984 | 20 October 1986 | 2 years, 292 days | Hassanal Bolkiah | |
| 2 | | Johar Noordin | 20 October 1986 | 25 March 1998 | 11 years, 132 days | Hassanal Bolkiah | |
| – | | Abdul Aziz Umar | 25 March 1998 | 17 May 2002 | 4 years, 53 days | Hassanal Bolkiah | |
| 3 | | Abu Bakar Apong | 17 May 2002 | 23 May 2005 | 3 years, 7 days | Hassanal Bolkiah | |
| 4 | | Suyoi Osman | 24 May 2005 | 28 May 2010 | 4 years, 364 days | Hassanal Bolkiah | |
| 5 | | Adanan Yusof | 29 May 2010 | 21 October 2015 | 5 years, 146 days | Hassanal Bolkiah | |
| 6 | | Zulkarnain Hanafi | 21 October 2015 | 1 December 2017 | 2 years, 41 days | Hassanal Bolkiah | |
| 7 | | Isham Jaafar | 1 December 2017 | Incumbent | 7 years, 186 days | Hassanal Bolkiah | |

=== Deputy ministers ===
| No. | Portrait | Minister | Term start | Term end | Time in office | Monarch | Ref. |
|---|---|---|---|---|---|---|---|
| 1 | | Hazair Abdullah | 24 May 2005 | 29 May 2010 | 4 years, 364 days | Hassanal Bolkiah | |
