= List of Bruneians =

This is a list of Bruneians, people who are identified with Brunei through residential, legal, historical or cultural means, grouped by their area of notability.

== Academicians ==
- Abdul Mokti Nasar
- Basir Taha
- Husain Yusof
- Jamil Al-Sufri
- Matussin Omar
- Norarfan Zainal
- Othman Bidin
- Rozan Yunos
- Pengiran Shariffuddin
- Zohrah Sulaiman

== Architects ==
- Siti Rozaimeriyanty

== Artists ==
- Shofry Abdul Ghafor
- Pengiran Asmalee
- Haini Hashim

== Businesspeople ==
- Prince Abdul Fattaah of Brunei
- Musa Adnin
- Abdul Hapidz
- Abdullah Al-Hashimi
- Ahmad Morshidi
- Anisha Rosnah
- Francis Wong (businessman)
- Goh King Chin
- Hong Kok Tin
- Mohamad Shuif Hussain
- Lau Ah Kok
- Lau How Teck
- Mary Lim
- Lim Cheng Choo
- Lim Teck Hoo
- Nik Hafimi
- Ong Boon Pang
- Ong Kim Kee
- Onn Siew Siong
- Ong Tiong Oh
- Haslina Taib

== Diplomacy ==
- Abdul Ghafar Ismail
- Prince Abdul Mateen of Brunei
- Pengiran Abdul Momin (born 1923)
- Abu Sufian Ali
- Adnan Buntar
- Adnan Mohd Ja'afar
- Malai Ahmad Murad
- Alaihuddin Taha
- Aziyan Abdullah
- Tan Bee Yong
- Emran bin Bahar
- Erywan Yusof
- Malai Halimah Yusoff
- Prince Mohamed Bolkiah
- Janin Erih
- Jemat Ampal
- Lim Jock Hoi
- Lim Jock Seng
- Johariah Abdul Wahab
- Kamilah Hanifah
- Pengiran Krtini
- Magdalene Teo
- Maidin Hashim
- Princess Masna of Brunei
- Masurai Masri
- Dayangku Mazlizah
- Megawati Manan
- Noor Qamar Sulaiman
- Pengiran Nooriyah
- Nor Jeludin
- Norazlianah Ibrahim
- Pengiran Anak Puteh
- Rakiah Abdul Lamit
- Roderick Yong
- Serbini Ali
- Shofry Abdul Ghafor
- Sidek Ali
- Wan Hadfi Lutfan
- Yusof Abu Bakar
- Yusoff Ismail

== Entertainers ==
- Prince Abdul Azim of Brunei
- Aziz Harun
- Besar Sagap
- Clinton Kane
- Eqah
- Fakhrul Razi
- Maria Grace Koh
- Hill Zaini
- Jaz (singer)
- Meria Aires
- Tiger Lim
- Paula Malai Ali
- Samantha Richelle
- Siti Kamaluddin
- Syafiq Abdillah
- Chloe Ting
- Wu Chun
- Zul F

== Lawyers ==
- Ahmad Isa
- Pengiran Bahrin
- Hairol Arni
- Hayati binti Mohd Salleh
- Kifrawi Kifli
- Nor Hashimah Taib
- Steven Chong Wan Oon

== Military ==
- Abdul Aziz Mohd Tamit
- Abdul Halim Hanifah
- Abdul Jalil Ahmad
- Abdul Razak Abdul Kadir
- Abdu'r Rahmani
- Pengiran Abidin
- Alirupendi
- Pengiran Aminan
- Aminuddin Ihsan
- Ariffin Abdul Wahab
- Azman Bangkol
- Halbi Mohammad Yussof
- Hamzah Sahat
- Haszaimi Bol Hassan
- Husin Ahmad
- Pengiran Ibnu Basit
- Ismaon Zainie
- Jaafar Abdul Aziz
- Jocklin Kongpaw
- Kefli Razali
- Khairil Abdul Rahman
- Khairul Hamed
- Mohamad Sarif Pudin
- Mohammad bin Daud
- Mohammad Sharif Ibrahim
- Mohammad Tawih
- Muhammad Wata
- Musa Yakub
- Norsuriati Sharbini
- Pengiran Norazmi
- Othman Suhaili
- Saifulrizal Abdul Latif
- Shahril Anwar
- Shanonnizam Sulaiman
- Shari Ahmad
- Spry Serudi
- Sulaiman Damit
- Wardi Abdul Latip

== Government ==
- A. M. Azahari
- Abbas Al-Sufri
- Abdul Aziz Hamdan
- Abdul Aziz Umar
- Abdul Hamid Bakal
- Abdul Kahar
- Pengiran Muda Abdul Kahar
- Abdul Majid Hassan
- Prince Abdul Malik of Brunei
- Abdul Mokti
- Abdul Momin
- Pengiran Abdul Momin (born 1927)
- Abdul Mutalib
- Abdul Rahman bin Ibrahim
- Abdul Rahman Taha
- Abdul Rahman Taib
- Abdullah Bakar
- Abdullah Hanafi
- Abidin Abdul Rashid
- Abu Bakar Apong
- Abu Bakar Jambol
- Pengiran Abu Bakar Salleh
- Adanan Yusof
- Adina Othman
- Ahmad Daud
- Ahmad Jumat
- Ahmad Tajuddin
- Ahmad Wally Skinner
- Ahmaddin Abdul Rahman
- Ali Apong
- Ali Mohammad Daud
- Al-Muhtadee Billah
- Amin Liew Abdullah
- Azmi Mohd Hanifah
- Badaruddin Othman
- Bahrin Abdullah
- Pengiran Bahrom
- Bolkiah
- Dani Ibrahim
- Elinda C.A. Mohammad
- Eusoff Agaki Ismail
- Hamdan Abu Bakar
- Hamdillah Abdul Wahab
- Pengiran Muda Hashim
- Pengiran Muda Hashim Abdul Rahman
- Hashim Jalilul Alam Aqamaddin
- Hasrin Sabtu
- Hassanal Bolkiah
- Hazair Abdullah
- Hisham Mohd Hanifah
- Hussain Mohammad Yusof
- Ibrahim Mohammad Jahfar
- Pengiran Anak Idris
- Isa bin Ibrahim
- Isham Jaafar
- Pengiran Ismail
- Iswandy Ahmad
- Prince Jefri Bolkiah
- Johar Nordin
- Juanda Abdul Rashid
- Pengiran Anak Kemaluddin Al-Haj
- Khairuddin Abdul Hamid
- Khairunnisa Ash'ari
- Pengiran Anak Khamis
- Lukan Uking
- Princess Majeedah Nuurul Bolkiah
- Marsal Maun
- Marzuke Mohsin
- Mat Suny
- Matnor McAfee
- Matsatejo Sokiaw
- Pengiran Anak Mohamed Alam
- Pengiran Mohammad Abdul Rahman
- Pengiran Mohammad Tashim
- Pengiran Mohammed Abdul Rahman Piut
- Pengiran Mokhtar Puteh
- Pengiran Muhammad Ali
- Muhammad Jamalul Alam II
- Muhammad Shah of Brunei
- Pengiran Muhammad Yusuf
- Mustappa bin Sirat
- Nazmi Mohamad
- Omar Ali Saifuddien III
- Othman Uking
- Queenie Chong
- Riza Yunos
- Romaizah Mohd Salleh
- Rosmawatty Abdul Mumin
- Saiful Rijal
- Salbiah Sulaiman
- Salleh Masri
- Pengiran Shamhary
- Sharif Ali
- Sufian Sabtu
- Suhaimi Gafar
- Suyoi Osman
- Taha Abdul Rauf
- Taib Besar
- Ya'akub Zainal
- Yahya Bakar
- Yahya Ibrahim
- Yakub Abu Bakar
- Yasmin Umar
- Yassin Affandi
- Yusof Husain
- Yusoff Abdul Hamid
- Zain Serudin
- Zaini Ahmad
- Zakaria Sulaiman
- Zasia binti Sirin
- Pengiran Zety Sufina
- Zulkarnain Hanafi

== Religious ==
- Ismail Omar Abdul Aziz, muslim scholar
- Abdul Aziz Juned, muslim scholar
- Mahmud Saedon, muslim scholar
- Cornelius Sim, cardinal

== Sportspeople ==
- Abdul Azizi Ali Rahman
- Pengiran Muda Abdul Hakeem
- Abdul Hariz Herman
- Adee Suhardee Muhidin
- Adi Said
- Ali Momin
- Ali Mustafa (footballer)
- Amalia Matali
- Aminuddin Zakwan Tahir
- Anderson Lim
- Anisah Najihah
- Princess Azemah Ni'matul Bolkiah
- Azwan Ali Rahman
- Azwan Saleh
- Pengiran Muda Bahar
- Basma Lachkar
- Christian Nikles
- Princess Fadzilah Lubabul Bolkiah
- Faiq Bolkiah
- Fakhri Ismail
- Faustina Woo Wai Sii
- Feisal Eusoff
- Ak Hafiy Tajuddin Rositi
- Haimie Abdullah Nyaring
- Hakeme Yazid Said
- Hanif Hamir
- Haseri Asli
- Hayley Wong
- Helme Panjang
- Helmi Zambin
- Hosea Wong
- Imay Hendra
- Jaspar Yu Woon Chai
- Jefry Mohammad
- Jimmy Anak Ahar
- Joshua Yong
- Lee Ying Shi
- Liew Chuan Fue
- Maizurah Abdul Rahim
- Maziah Mahusin
- Pengiran Mohamed
- Mohammad Adi Salihin
- Moksen Mohammad
- Muhammad Isa Ahmad
- Muhd Noor Firdaus Ar-Rasyid
- Haji Naim Brahim
- Najib Tarif
- Norsillmy Taha
- Nur Ikhwan Othman
- Nur Wasiqah Aziemah
- Razimie Ramlli
- Rosanan Samak
- Rosli Liman
- Rosmin Kamis
- Said Abdullah
- Sallehuddin Damit
- Shah Razen Said
- Shari Haji Juma'at
- Prince Sufri Bolkiah
- Tong Kit Siong
- Yunos Yusof
- Yusof Matyassin
- Zainuddin Kassim
- Zeke Chan

== Writers ==
- Ain Bandial
- Muslim Burut
- Norsiah Abdul Gapar
- Paula Malai Ali
- Pengiran Indera Mahkota

== Miscellaneous ==
- Abdullah bin Othman, social worker and activist
- Sharifah Czarena, first Bruneian woman to captain a commercial airliner
- Irwan Hambali, police commissioner
- Jammy Shah Al-Islam, police commissioner
- Pengiran Jaya, police commissioner
- Dayangku Najibah Eradah, first Bruneian to reach South Pole
- Princess Rashidah Sa'adatul Bolkiah
- Queen Saleha of Brunei
- Sariana Nordin, first Bruneian female pilot to work at Royal Brunei Airlines
- Pengiran Umar, police commissioner
