= Order of Seri Paduka Mahkota Brunei =

Honorific order of the Sultanate of Brunei

The Most Honourable Order of Seri Paduka Mahkota Brunei Darjah Seri Paduka Mahkota Brunei Yang Amat Mulia
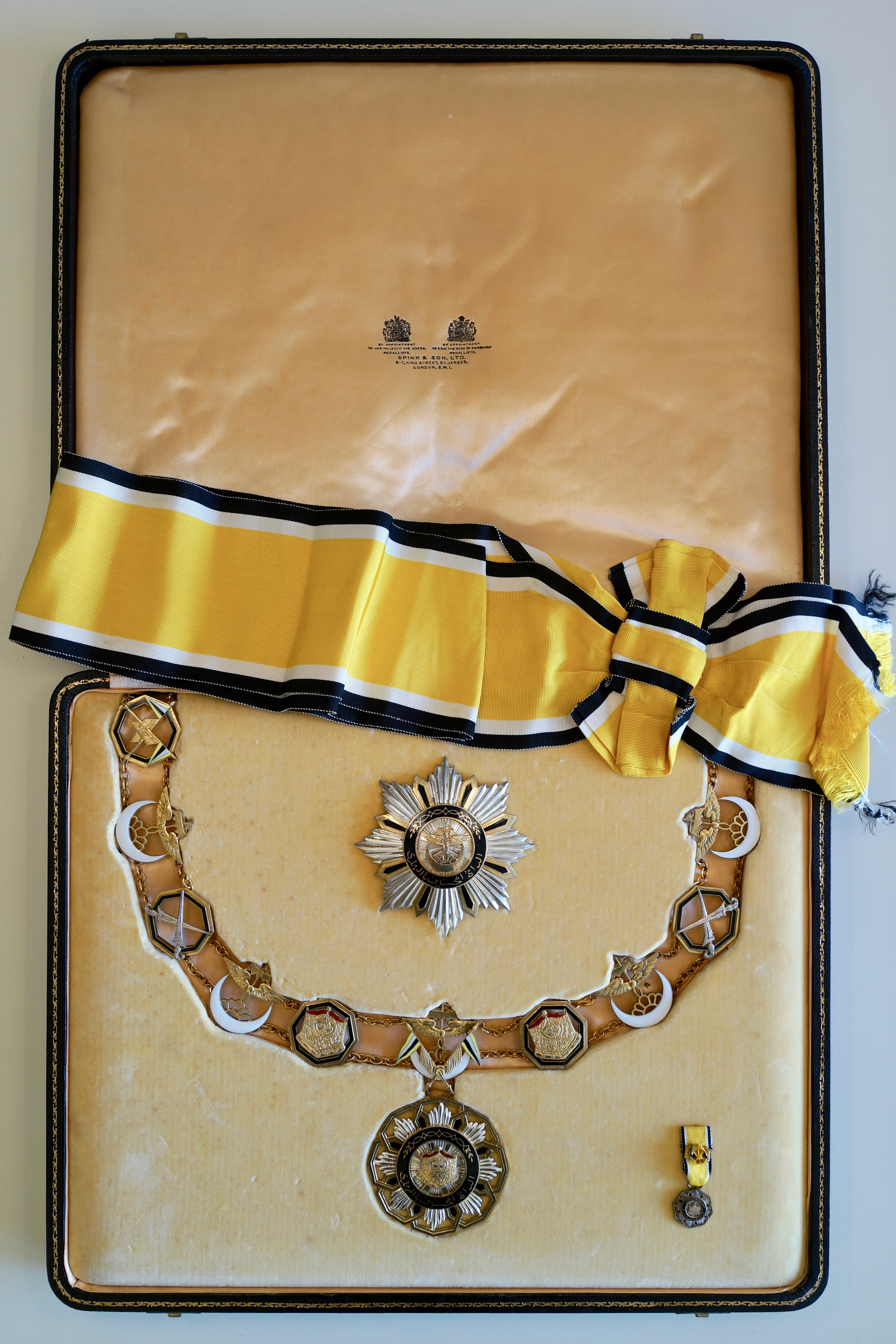
- DPMB neck decoration

Awarded by Sultan of Brunei
- Type: Order of chivalry
- Established: 1954
- Country: Brunei
- Awarded for: For service to the Sultan in exceptional or significant ways
- Status: Currently constituted
- Sovereign: Hassanal Bolkiah
- Grades: Grand Commander (SPMB); Commander (DPMB); Companion (SMB)

Precedence
- Next (higher): Order of Paduka Seri Laila Jasa
- Next (lower): Order of Perwira Agong Negara Brunei
- (SPMB) (DPMB) (SMB)

The Most Honourable Order of Seri Paduka Mahkota Brunei (Malay: Darjah Seri Paduka Mahkota Brunei Yang Amat Mulia), also translated as The Most Honourable Order of the Seri Paduka Crown of Brunei, is an order of Brunei Darussalam. It was established on 1 March 1954 by Sultan Omar Ali Saifuddien III.

== Current classes ==
The three classes of appointment to the Order are, from highest grade to lowest grade:

| Class | Post-nominal | Title | Ribbon bar |
|---|---|---|---|
| Grand Commander | SPMB | Dato Seri Paduka | |
| Commander | DPMB | Dato Paduka | |
| Companion | SMB | — | |

== Description ==
The majority of the state crest is shown on the collar chain's front and back, and two of the crowns are arranged in an octagonal shape of black enamel. In the other links, a portion of the state crest is shown significantly differently with white crescent moons, crossed kris, and crossed flags. The first class included a 62 millimetres (2.4 in) silver-gilt, silver-and-enamel neck badge; an 87 millimetres (3.4 in) silver-gilt, silver-and-enamel star with a maker's cartouche on the reverse in excellent condition; neck ribands; and a fitted box of issuance.

== Recipients ==
This order was established to honor those who have helped the Sultan in exceptional or significant ways.

=== First Class ===
Typical Bruneian recipients include Deputy Ministers, the Chief Justice, and the Attorney General.

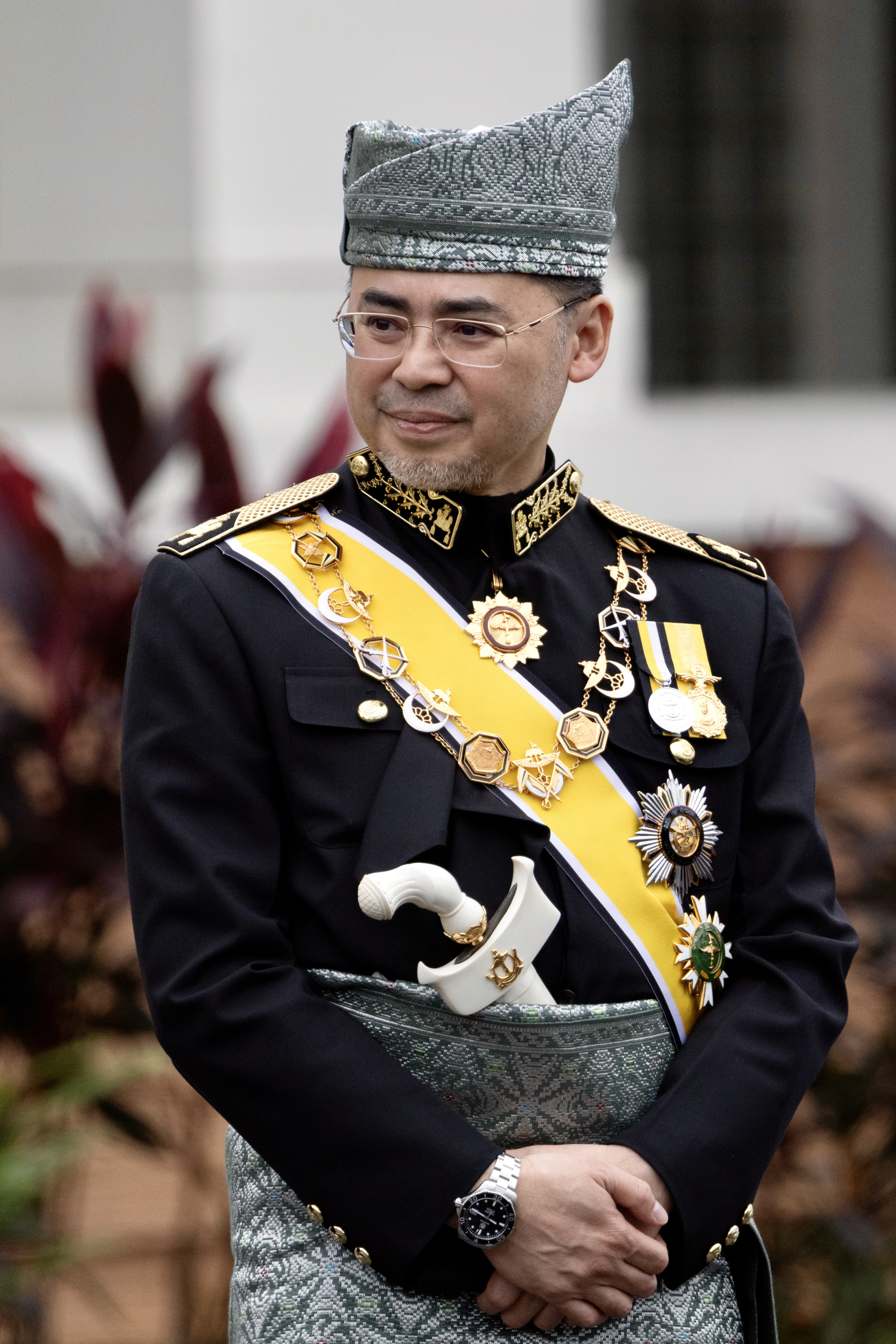
Tashim Hassan wearing the order's sash in 2024

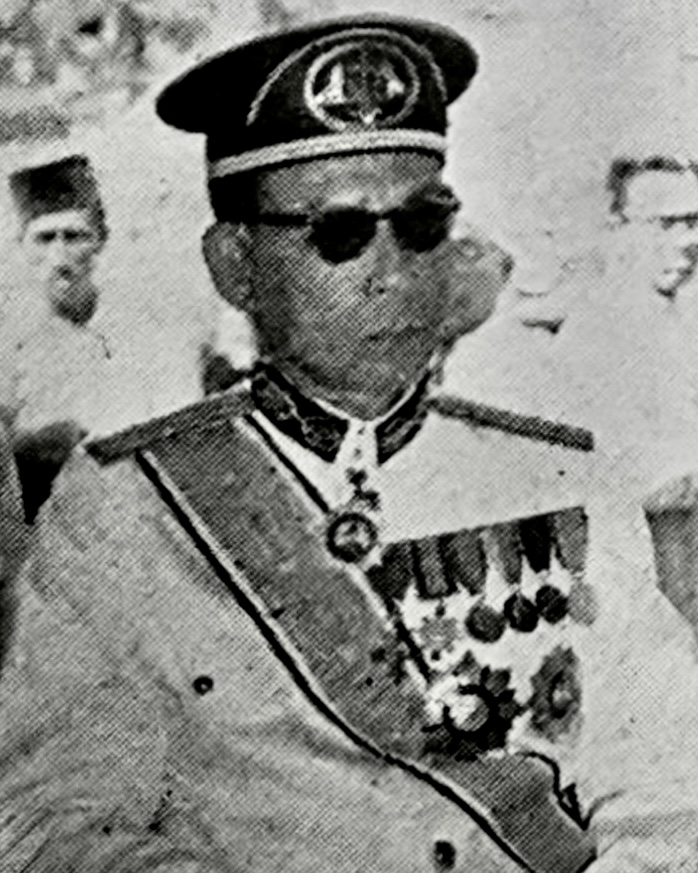
Ibrahim Mohd Jahfar seen wearing his sash in 1971

- Unknown – Hassanal Bolkiah – Sultan of Brunei
- Unknown – Omar Ali Saifuddien III – Sultan of Brunei
- Unknown – Major General Sulaiman – Commander of the Royal Brunei Armed Forces
- Unknown – Marsal Maun – Menteri Besar
- Unknown – Pengiran Muhammad Ali – Deputy Menteri Besar
- Unknown – Lim Jock Seng – Minister of Foreign Affairs and Trade II
- Unknown – Ali Mohammad Daud – Deputy Minister of Foreign Affairs
- Unknown – Ahmaddin Abdul Rahman – Minister of Home Affairs
- Unknown – Charles Fletcher-Cooke – Constitutional Adviser to Sultan Hassanal Bolkiah
- Unknown – Hussain Mohammad Yusof – Minister of Culture, Youth and Sports
- Unknown – Ahmad Jumat – Minister of Culture, Youth and Sports
- Unknown – Pengiran Anak Hashim – Member of Legislative Council
- Unknown – Pengiran Mohammed Abdul Rahman Piut – Member of Privy Council
- Unknown – Lim Cheng Choo – Member of Privy Council
- Unknown – Idris Talog Davies – Attorney General of Brunei
- Unknown – Kifrawi Kifli – Chief Justice of Brunei
- 1959 – Ibrahim Mohammad Jahfar – Speaker of Legislative Council
- 1963 – Pengiran Anak Mohamed Alam – Speaker of Legislative Council
- 1963 – Pengiran Muhammad Yusuf – Menteri Besar
- 1963 – Dennis White – British High Commissioner to Brunei
- 1968 – Abdul Rahman Taha – Member of Privy Council
- 1969 – Pengiran Anak Kemaluddin Al-Haj – Principal Officer of the Department of Religious Affairs
- 1969 – Abbas Al-Sufri – Acting Personal Secretary to Sultan Omar Ali Saifuddien III
- 1970 – Marianne E. Lloyd-Dolbey – Personal Secretary to Sultan Omar Ali Saifuddien III
- 1970 – Isa bin Ibrahim – Special Adviser to His Majesty the Sultan and Yang Di-Pertuan of Brunei Darussalam
- 1972 – William lan Glass – Controller of Civil Aviation and Establishment Officer
- 1984 – Denys Roberts – Chief Justice of the Supreme Court of Brunei Darussalam
- 1998 – Yahya Bakar – Minister of Industry and Primary Resources
- 2006 – Yasmin Umar – Minister of Energy
- 2006 – Eusoff Agaki Ismail – Deputy Minister at the Prime Minister's Office
- 2011 – Hayati Mohd Salleh – Attorney General of Brunei
- 2012 – Musa Aman – Chief Minister of Sabah
- 2014 – Anifah Aman – Minister of Foreign Affairs Malaysia
- 2017 – Amin Liew – Minister of Finance and Economy II
- 2017 – Hamdan Abu Bakar – Deputy Minister at the Prime Minister's Office
- 2017 – Roselan Daud – Deputy Minister at the Prime Minister's Office
- 2017 – Hisham Mohd Hanifah – Deputy Minister of Finance
- 2017 – Erywan Yusof – Minister of Foreign Affairs II
- 2017 – Pengiran Bahrom – Deputy Minister of Education
- 2017 – Abdul Mokti – Deputy Minister of Religious Affairs
- 2017 – Suhaimi Gafar – Deputy Minister of Development
- 2018 – John Barry Mortimer – President of the Court of Appeal
- 2018 – Ahmaddin Abdul Rahman – Deputy Minister of Finance
- 2018 – Matsatejo Sokiaw – Deputy Minister of Energy and Industry
- 2018 – Elinda C.A. Mohammad – Deputy Minister at the Prime Minister's Office
- 2019 – Steven Chong Wan Oon – Chief Justice of the Supreme Court of Brunei Darussalam
- 2019 – Marzuke Mohsin – Deputy Minister of Development
- 2022 – Riza Yunos – Deputy Minister at the Prime Minister's Office
- 2022 – Sufian Sabtu – Deputy Minister at the Prime Minister's Office
- 2022 – Pengiran Zety Sufina – Deputy Minister of Finance and Economy
- 2022 – Pengiran Mohammad Tashim – Deputy Minister of Religious Affairs
- 2022 – Khairuddin Abdul Hamid – Deputy Minister of Finance and Economy
- 2022 – Ahmad Isa – Attorney General
- 2024 – Nor Hashimah Taib – Attorney General
- 2024 – Azmi Mohd Hanifah – Deputy Minister of Energy

=== Second Class ===
- Unknown – Suyoi Osman – Minister of Development
- Unknown – Hazair Abdullah – Minister of Culture, Youth and Sports
- Unknown – Pengiran Umar – Commissioner of Police
- Unknown – Roderick Yong – Secretary-General of ASEAN
- Unknown – Ahmad Wally Skinner – Deputy Minister of Finance
- Unknown – Yakub Abu Bakar – Deputy Minister of Finance
- Unknown – Zasia Sirin – Member of the Legislative Council
- Unknown – Timothy Ong – Founder of Asia Inc Forum
- Unknown – Pengiran Anak Khamis – Member of Privy Council
- Unknown – Yusoff Abdul Hamid – Deputy Minister of Communications
- Unknown – Malai Ahmad Murad – Diplomat
- Unknown – Mahadi Wasli – Diplomat
- Unknown – Adnan Buntar – Diplomat
- Unknown – Pengiran Asmalee – Diplomat
- Unknown – Jemat Ampal – Diplomat
- Unknown – Nor Jeludin – Diplomat
- Unknown – Maidin Hashim – Diplomat
- Unknown – George Edwin Coster – Assistant Commissioner in the Special Branch
- Unknown – Idris Talog Davies – Attorney General of Brunei
- Unknown – Pengiran Shariffuddin – Director of Brunei Museum
- Unknown – Onn Siew Siong – member of Manteri
- Unknown – Othman Bidin – first principal of the Seri Begawan Religious Teachers College
- Unknown – Lieutenant Colonel Musa – Commander of the Training Institute
- Unknown – Lieutenant Colonel Mohammad Ariffin – Commander of the Training Institute
- Unknown – Colonel Kefli – Commander of the Royal Brunei Navy
- Unknown – Taha Abdul Rauf – Member of Legislative Council
- 1956 – Pengiran Muhammad Salleh – Chief Kadi
- 1958 – Tunku Abdul Rahman – Prime Minister of Malaysia
- 1958 – Abdul Razak Hussein – Deputy Prime Minister of Malaysia
- 1958 – Abbas Al-Sufri – ADC to Sultan Omar Ali Saifuddien III
- 1959 – R. E. Hales – managing director of British Malayan Petroleum Company
- 1960 – Mohamed Noah Omar – Speaker of the Dewan Rakyat
- 1962 – Pengiran Anak Khamis – Member of Privy Council
- 1962 – Pengiran Anak Safar – Member of Privy Council
- 1962 – Yusof Husain – Member of Privy Council
- 1965 – Anthony Stean "Tich" Harvey – British military officer
- 1969 – Pengiran Abdul Momin Ismail – Menteri Besar
- 1971 – Salleh Masri – Member of Legislative Council
- 1974 – Basir Taha – Teacher
- 1975 – Thomas Stevenson Swan – Assistant Commissioner of Police
- 1976 – Hamzah Salleh – ADC to His Majesty Sultan Hassanal Bolkiah 1988-1999
- 1979 – Judin Asar – clerk to the Privy Council
- 1987 – Badaruddin Othman – Minister of Religious Affairs
- 1987 – Abdullah Bakar – Minister of Development
- 1989 – Lim Teck Hoo – Businessman
- 1994 – Matussin Omar – Director of Brunei Museum
- 1998 – Hamdillah Abdul Wahab – Deputy Minister of Industry and Primary Resources
- 1999 – Dani Ibrahim – Deputy Minister of Home Affairs
- 2000 – Mahadi Wasli – Ambassador of Brunei to Germany
- 2000 – Abdul Rahman Johan – Deputy Commissioner of Police
- 2002 – Abdul Wahab Juned – Permanent Secretary at the Prime Minister's Office
- 2002 – Steven Chong Wan Oon – High Court Judge
- 2002 – Pengiran Masrainah – Ambassador of Brunei to France
- 2003 – Abdul Hamid Yassin – Permanent Secretary at the Prime Minister's Office
- 2003 – Colonel Mahmud Saidin – Commander of the Royal Brunei Air Force
- 2003 – Colonel Joharie Matussin – Commander of the Royal Brunei Navy
- 2003 – Yasmin Umar – Director of Intelligence and Security
- 2003 – Metassan Omar – Permanent Secretary at the Ministry of Finance
- 2003 – Buntar Osman – Chief Executive of the Authority for Info-communications Technology Industry
- 2003 – Eusoff Agaki Ismail – Controller at the Royal Customs and Excise
- 2003 – Yusra Abdul Halim – Director of Institut Teknologi Brunei
- 2003 – Colonel Abdu'r Rahmani – Commander of the Royal Brunei Land Force
- 2005 – Adnan Zainal – Ambassador of Brunei to the United Arab Emirates
- 2005 – Ali Apong – Permanent Secretary at the Ministry of Finance
- 2005 – Hamid Jaafar – Permanent Secretary at the Ministry of Industry and Primary Resources
- 2005 – Serbini Ali – Permanent Secretary at the Ministry of Health
- 2005 – Matassan Daud – Permanent Secretary at the Ministry of Development
- 2005 – Ismail Duraman – Vice Chancellor of Universiti Brunei Darussalam
- 2005 – Saifon Besar – Director-General of Public Service
- 2005 – Ghani Omar – Deputy Commissioner of Police
- 2005 – Colonel Mahmud – Commander of the Royal Brunei Air Force
- 2006 – Shofry Abdul Ghafor – Permanent Secretary at the Ministry of Foreign Affairs and Trade
- 2006 – Mustappa Sirat – Permanent Secretary at the Ministry of Defence
- 2006 – Goh King Chin – Founder of Goh Hock Kee Motors
- 2006 – Lau Ah Kok – Founder of Hua Ho
- 2006 – Idris Abbas – Founder of Arkitek Idris
- 2006 – Rosli Chuchu – Commander of the Royal Brunei Land Force
- 2006 – Abdul Hapidz – Managing director of Abdul Razak Holdings
- 2006 – Muslim Burut – Writer
- 2007 – Lim Jock Hoi – Secretary-General of ASEAN
- 2007 – Salbiah Sulaiman – Member of the Legislative Council
- 2008 – Tan Bee Yong – High Commissioner of Brunei to New Zealand
- 2008 – Yunus Mahmud – Ambassador of Brunei to Nordic Nations
- 2008 – Jaberuddin Mohd Salleh – Ambassador of Brunei to Saudi Arabia
- 2008 – Hairol Arni – Attorney General of Brunei
- 2010 – Bahrin Abdullah – Deputy Minister of Finance
- 2010 – Mahadi Ibrahim – Auditor General
- 2010 – Alaihuddin Taha – Diplomat
- 2010 – Abdul Ghafar Ismail – Diplomat
- 2010 – Sidek Ali – Brunei's High Commissioner to India
- 2010 – Janin Erih – Brunei's Permanent Representative at the United Nations
- 2010 – Zasia Sirin – Member of the Legislative Council
- 2010 – Hasrin Sabtu – Brunei Commissioner of Police
- 2011 – Zulkarnain Hanafi – Minister of Health
- 2011 – Pengiran Bahrom – Deputy Minister of Religious Affairs
- 2011 – Adina Othman – Deputy Minister of Culture, Youth and Sports
- 2011 – Abdul Jalil Ahmad – Brunei High Commissioner to Singapore
- 2012 – Major General Pengiran Aminan – Commander of the Royal Brunei Armed Forces
- 2012 – Magdalene Teo Chee Siong – Ambassador of Brunei to China
- 2012 – Basmillah Abbas – Ambassador of Brunei to Cambodia
- 2012 – Affendy Abidin – Permanent Secretary at the Ministry of Home Affairs
- 2012 – Hamiddon Ibrahim – Deputy Personal and Confidential Secretary to Sultan Hassanal Bolkiah
- 2013 – Norlila Abdul Jalil – Permanent Secretary at the Ministry of Health
- 2013 – Aziyan Abdullah – Brunei High Commissioner to the United Kingdom
- 2013 – Abu Kassim Mohamed – Chairman of the Malaysian Rasuah Prevention Commission
- 2013 – Juanda Abdul Rashid – Permanent Secretary at Prime Minister's Office
- 2013 – Malai Halimah Yusoff – Brunei High Commissioner to France
- 2013 – Suriyah Umar – Permanent Secretary at the Ministry of Defence
- 2013 – Juanda Abdul Rashid – Director of Anti-Corruption Bureau
- 2013 – Jamain Julaihi – Permanent Secretary (Energy) at the Prime Minister's Office
- 2013 – Abu Kassim Mohamed – Chief of Malaysian Anti-Corruption Commission
- 2016 – Eddie Sunny – Permanent Secretary at the Ministry of Development
- 2017 – Hamzah Sulaiman – Minister of Education
- 2017 – Maslina Mohsin – Deputy Permanent Secretary at the Minister of Health
- 2017 – Haini Hashim – Ambassador of Brunei to Russia
- 2017 – Rakiah Abdul Lamit – Ambassador of Brunei to Germany
- 2017 – Irwan Hambali – Acting Deputy Commissioner of Police
- 2017 – Rosli Mohd Salleh – Acting Commissioner of Police
- 2018 – Jefri Abdul Hamid – Assistant Commissioner of Police
- 2018 – Ahmad Hassan – Assistant Commissioner of Police
- 2018 – Yussof Bahar – Acting Director of the Criminal Investigation Department
- 2022 – Zohrah Sulaiman – Vice-Chancellor of Universiti Teknologi Brunei
- 2022 – Anifa Rafiza Abdul Ghani – Director of the Anti-Corruption Bureau
- 2023 – Nor Hashimah Taib – Attorney General of Brunei

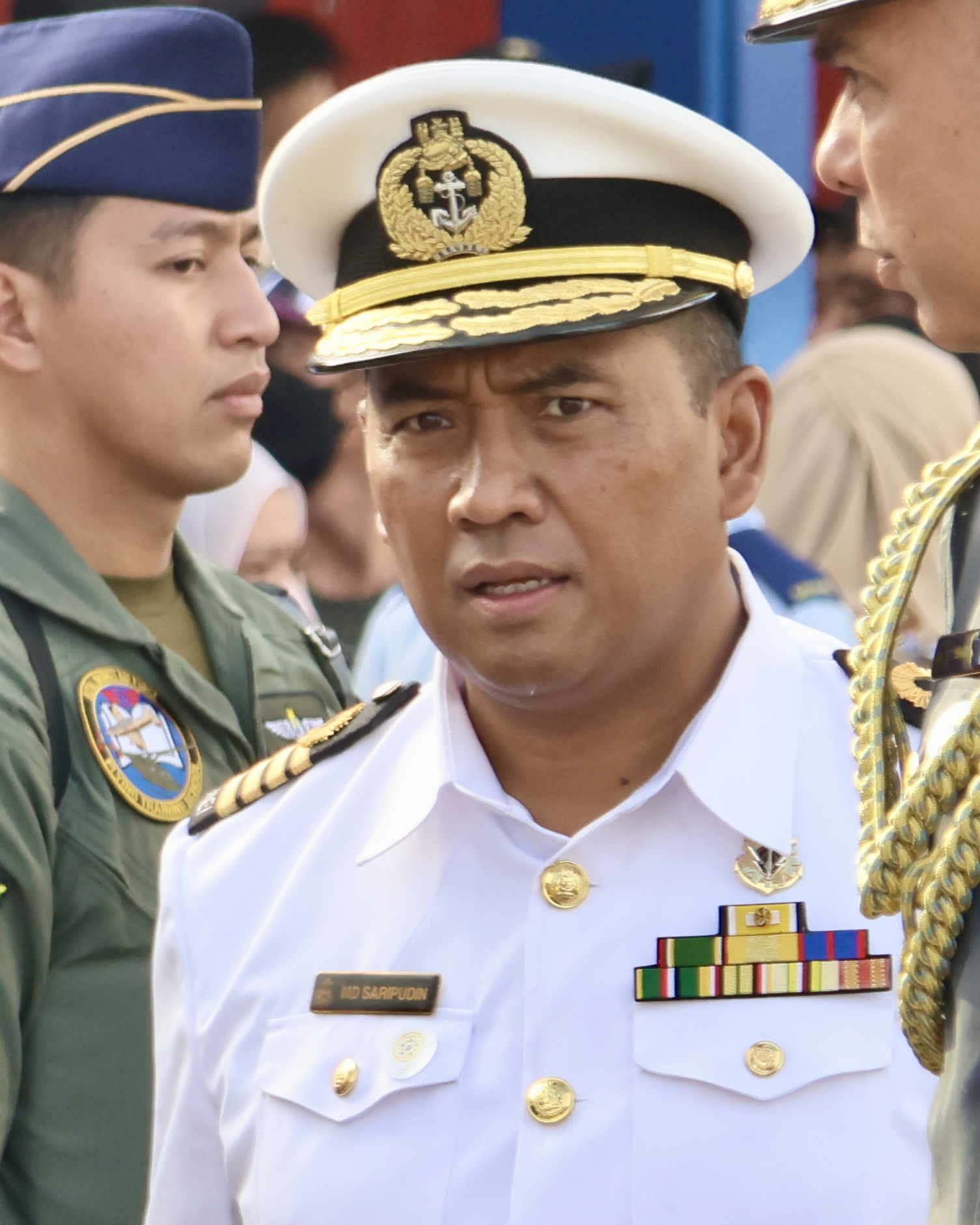
SMB ribbon bar as seen on Captain Mohamad Sarif Pudin, acting commander of Royal Brunei Navy

=== Third Class ===
- Unknown – Ismail Omar Abdul Aziz – State Mufti
- Unknown – Brigadier General Wardi – Commander of the Royal Brunei Air Force
- Unknown – Major General Jaafar – Commander of the Royal Brunei Armed Forces
- Unknown – Major General Tawih – Commander of the Royal Brunei Armed Forces
- Unknown – Major General Hamzah – Commander of the Royal Brunei Armed Forces
- Unknown – First Admiral Abdul Halim – Commander of the Royal Brunei Navy
- Unknown – First Admiral Spry – Commander of the Royal Brunei Navy
- Unknown – Brigadier General Shanonnizam – Commander of the Royal Brunei Land Force
- Unknown – Captain Mohamad Sarif Pudin – Acting Commander of the Royal Brunei Navy
- Unknown – Captain Khairil – Acting Deputy Commander of the Royal Brunei Navy
- Unknown – Colonel Abdul Jalil – Commander of the Royal Brunei Navy
- Unknown – Colonel Mohammad Ismaon – Director of the Force Capability Development at the Ministry of Defence
- Unknown – Jammy Shah Al-Islam – Commissioner of Police
- Unknown – Othman Uking – Member of the Legislative Council
- Unknown – Pengiran Anak Idris – Member of Privy Council
- Unknown – Pengiran Muda Abdul Kahar – Member of Tujuh Serangkai
- 1958 – Pengiran Muhammad Yusuf – Member of the Legislative Council
- 1958 – Pengiran Muhammad Ali – Member of the Legislative Council
- 1958 – Marsal Maun – Member of the Legislative Council
- 1959 – Suffian Hashim – Acting Attorney General of Malaya
- 1962 – Besar Sagap – Composer of Allah Peliharakan Sultan
- 1966 – Abu Bakar Jambol – Member of Tujuh Serangkai
- 1969 – Lim Cheng Choo – Member of Privy Council
- 1969 – Abdul What Sabtu Kemaluddin – Nobility
- 1969 – Omar Ali Abdul Rahman – Nobility
- 1969 – Musa Hitam – Nobility
- 1970 – Abidin Abdul Rashid – Deputy Minister of Home Affairs
- 1982 – Abu Bakar Apong – Minister of Home Affairs
- 1986 – Major General Halbi – Commander of the Royal Brunei Armed Forces
- 2003 – Major General Aminuddin Ihsan – Commander of the Royal Brunei Armed Forces
- 2006 – First Admiral Abdul Aziz – Commander of the Royal Brunei Navy
- 2010 – Abu Sufian Ali – Director of the Department of International Trade
- 2011 – Abdul Mutalib – Minister of Communications
- 2012 – Major General Haszaimi – Commander of the Royal Brunei Armed Forces
- 2013 – Colonel Azman – Deputy Commander of the Royal Brunei Land Force
- 2015 – First Admiral Othman – Commander of the Royal Brunei Navy
- 2017 – Brigadier General Shahril Anwar – Commander of the Royal Brunei Air Force
- 2017 – Brigadier General Sharif – Commander of the Royal Brunei Air Force
- 2017 – Brigadier General Saifulrizal – Commander of the Royal Brunei Land Force
- 2023 – Colonel Muhammad Wata – Deputy Commander of the Royal Brunei Land Force
- 2024 – Aliuddin Abdul Rahman – Deputy Permanent Secretary (Core Education) at the Ministry of Education
- 2024 – Mohammad Dollah – Acting Director of National Service
- 2024 – Musa Sulaiman – Senior Special Duties Officer
- 2024 – Noorafidah Sulaiman – Deputy Managing Director of Brunei Darussalam Central Bank

=== Former recipients ===
- 2006 – Nawawi Taha – Personal and Confidential Secretary to Sultan Hassanal Bolkiah
