= Attorney General of Brunei =

Public prosecutor and legal advisor to the government of Brunei

- Peguam Negara Brunei ڤڬوام نڬارا بروني

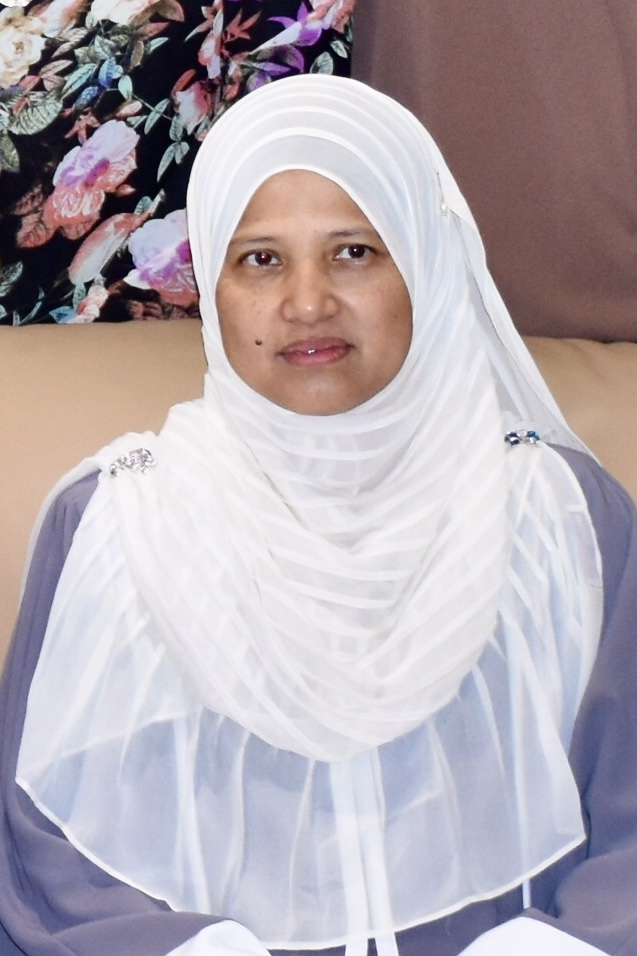
- Incumbent; Datin Paduka Nor Hashimah Taib since 29 February 2024
- Attorney General's Chambers
- Style: The Honourable (Malay: Yang Berhormat)
- Type: Attorney General
- Member of: Council of Cabinet Ministers
- Reports to: Prime Minister
- Seat: Attorney General's Chambers, Bandar Seri Begawan, Brunei
- Appointer: Hassanal Bolkiah; as Sultan of Brunei
- Term length: At His Majesty's pleasure
- Constituting instrument: Constitution of Brunei
- Precursor: Attorney General of Sarawak
- Formation: 29 September 1959
- First holder: Ali Hassan
- Website: www.agc.gov.bn

The Attorney General's Chambers (AGC; Malay: Pejabat Peguam Negara) is the public prosecutor of Brunei, and legal adviser to the Government of Brunei. The functions of the attorney general are carried out with the assistance of the deputy attorney-general and the solicitor-general, through the AGC. Moreover, assisting the Royal Brunei Police Force (RBPF) and other enforcement agencies in carrying out their investigations, advising and approving prosecutions.

== History ==
The 1905–1906 Supplementary Agreement created the British Residential system, while the 1908 Enactment, which reorganised the nation's legal system, amended it subsequently. The Court of the Resident, Magistrates of the First and Second Class, Native Magistrates, and tribunals of Kathis were the five categories of tribunals described in this second statute. With the exception of instances involving marriages consummated in accordance with British law, the Court of the Resident served as the principal court for civil and criminal proceedings, having both original and appellate jurisdiction. First Class Magistrates handled more serious crimes and civil disputes up to a specific value, whereas Second Class Magistrates had more restricted jurisdiction. Magistrates' courts were divided into classes. Islamic law matters and Malays were heard by the Native Magistrates and Kathis Courts.

Prior to 1959, the Attorney General of Sarawak handled the role of Legal Adviser for the Bruneian Government, with assistance from a Deputy Legal Adviser based in Brunei. The Attorney General of Brunei was appointed on 29 September 1959, the day the Constitution of Brunei was declared, and as of that date, the Attorney General of Sarawak was no longer the government's legal adviser. In August 2008, the position of Attorney General was promoted to ministerial rank.

== Functions ==
The Attorney General, supported by the solicitor general and counsels, serves as the primary legal advisor to the Sultan and Government of Brunei. In addition to representing the government in civil and criminal proceedings, the Attorney General collaborates with various ministries and departments to draft legislation. Under Article 81 of the Constitution, the Attorney General is empowered to initiate, conduct, or terminate criminal proceedings, with all prosecutions conducted in the name of the public prosecutor, assisted by deputy public prosecutors for trials in both Supreme and Subordinate Courts.

The Attorney General also advises during investigations and prosecutions carried out by the RBPF and other agencies. Key legislation such as the Criminal Procedure Code, Anti-Terrorism Order, and Criminal Asset Recovery Order outlines additional statutory duties for the office. The Attorney General further serves as the Registrar for Registries of Industrial Designs, Marriages, Patents, and Trade Marks, providing essential public services. Appointed by the Sultan, the Attorney General operates independently and can be removed from office at the Sultan's discretion.

== List of attorneys general ==
Symbols

Acting attorney general

No.	Portrait	Name	Term start	Term end	Time in office	Monarch	Ref.
1		Tan Sri Datuk; Ali Hassan علي حسن (b.1916)	29 September 1959	19 September 1961	1 year, 355 days	Omar Ali Saifuddien III	
2		Tan Sri Dato' Paduka; Abdul Aziz Zain عبدالعزيز زاين (1922–2012)	20 September 1961	14 January 1963	1 year, 116 days	Omar Ali Saifuddien III	
3		Pehin Orang Kaya Laila Kanun Diraja; Dato Laila Utama; Idris Talog Davies (1917–1977)	15 January 1963	22 July 1977	14 years, 188 days (Note: Died in office between 21 and 22 July 1977.)	Omar Ali Saifuddien III	
4		Pengiran Laila Kanun Diraja; Pengiran Bahrin ڤڠيرن بهرين (b.1946)	1 January 1978	24 June 1998	20 years, 235 days	Hassanal Bolkiah	
5		Dato Seri Paduka; Kifrawi Kifli كيفراوي كيفلي	24 June 1998	4 August 2009	10 years, 345 days	Hassanal Bolkiah	
6		Datin Seri Paduka; Hayati Salleh حياتي صالح	4 August 2009	18 August 2018	9 years, 14 days (Note: First female officeholder.)	Hassanal Bolkiah	
7		Dato Paduka; Hairol Arni هايرول ارني	18 August 2018	27 July 2020	1 year, 344 days (Note: Tenure suddenly terminated on 27 July 2020.)	Hassanal Bolkiah	
–		Zuraini Sharbawi ذورايني شرباوي	27 July 2020	6 October 2020	71 days (Note: Replacement for Hairol Arni.)	Hassanal Bolkiah	
8		Dato Seri Paduka; Ahmad Isa احمد عيسى	6 October 2020	29 February 2024	3 years, 146 days	Hassanal Bolkiah	
9		Datin Seri Paduka; Nor Hashimah Taib نور هشيمه طائب	29 February 2024	Incumbent	2 years, 207 days	Hassanal Bolkiah	
