= Zuraini Sharbawi =

Bruneian lawyer

- ذورايني شرباوي
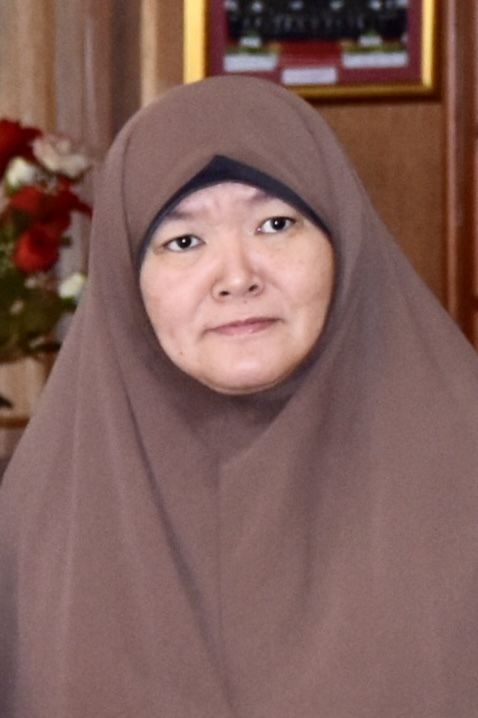
- Zuraini in 2017

Attorney General of Brunei
- In office 27 July 2020 – 6 October 2020
- Monarch: Hassanal Bolkiah
- Preceded by: Hairol Arni
- Succeeded by: Ahmad Isa

Personal details
- Born: Brunei
- Profession: Lawyer

Dayang Hajah Zuraini bint Haji Sharbawi (Jawi: ذورايني شرباوي) is a Bruneian lawyer who currently serves as Solicitor General of Brunei. In 2020, she acted as interim Attorney General for 71 days following the termination of Hairol Arni's term by the Bruneian government.

== Career ==
Zuraini has worked for the Attorney General's Office since at least 2006. That year, she contributed to the establishment of a victim response unit within the Criminal Justice Division, to support victims of crime to understand the criminal justice process, and to receive updates on their cases.

By 2018, Zuraini had become the Solicitor General of Brunei, the second-ranked law officer of the state. She represented Brunei at the 10th ASEAN Law Ministers Meeting, held in Vientiane, Laos.

On 27 July 2020, the term of Hairol Arni, the Attorney General, was abruptly terminated by the Bruneian government; no reason was given for the decision. As Solicitor General, Zuraini was named interim Attorney General, pending the naming of Arni's successor. During her tenure, Zuraini met with Yamamoto Eiji, the ambassador of Japan to Brunei.

On 5 October 2020, Radio Television Brunei announced that Ahmad Isa, a managing partner of Ahmad Isa & Partners, had been named as Brunei's new permanent Attorney General. He took over from Zuraini the following day, and she resumed her role as Solicitor General. The following year, Zuraini was named as a member of the board of the newly established Brunei Darussalam Central Bank by Hassanal Bolkiah. She was reelected to the role in 2025.

In her role as Solicitor General, Zuraini has represented Brunei and Bruneian interests at various meetings and conferences. This has included the Symposium on Corruption and Foreign Direct Investment in the Asia-Pacific Region, held by Universiti Brunei Darussalam in May 2023; a clinic on intellectual property management held in collaboration with the World Intellectual Property Organization in March 2024; and bilateral cooperation in legal and institutional matters discussions with M. Kulasegaran, the Deputy Minister in the Prime Minister's Department of Malaysia in February 2025.

Zurani continues to be Solicitor General of Brunei as of 2026.

Legal offices
| Preceded by Hairol Arni | Interim Attorney General of Brunei; 27 July 2020 – 6 October 2020 | Succeeded by Ahmad Isa |
