= Hayati binti Mohd Salleh =

Bruneian lawyer

Datin Seri Paduka Hayati binti Mohd Salleh SPMB PJK PIKB PKL
- حياتي بنت محمد صالح
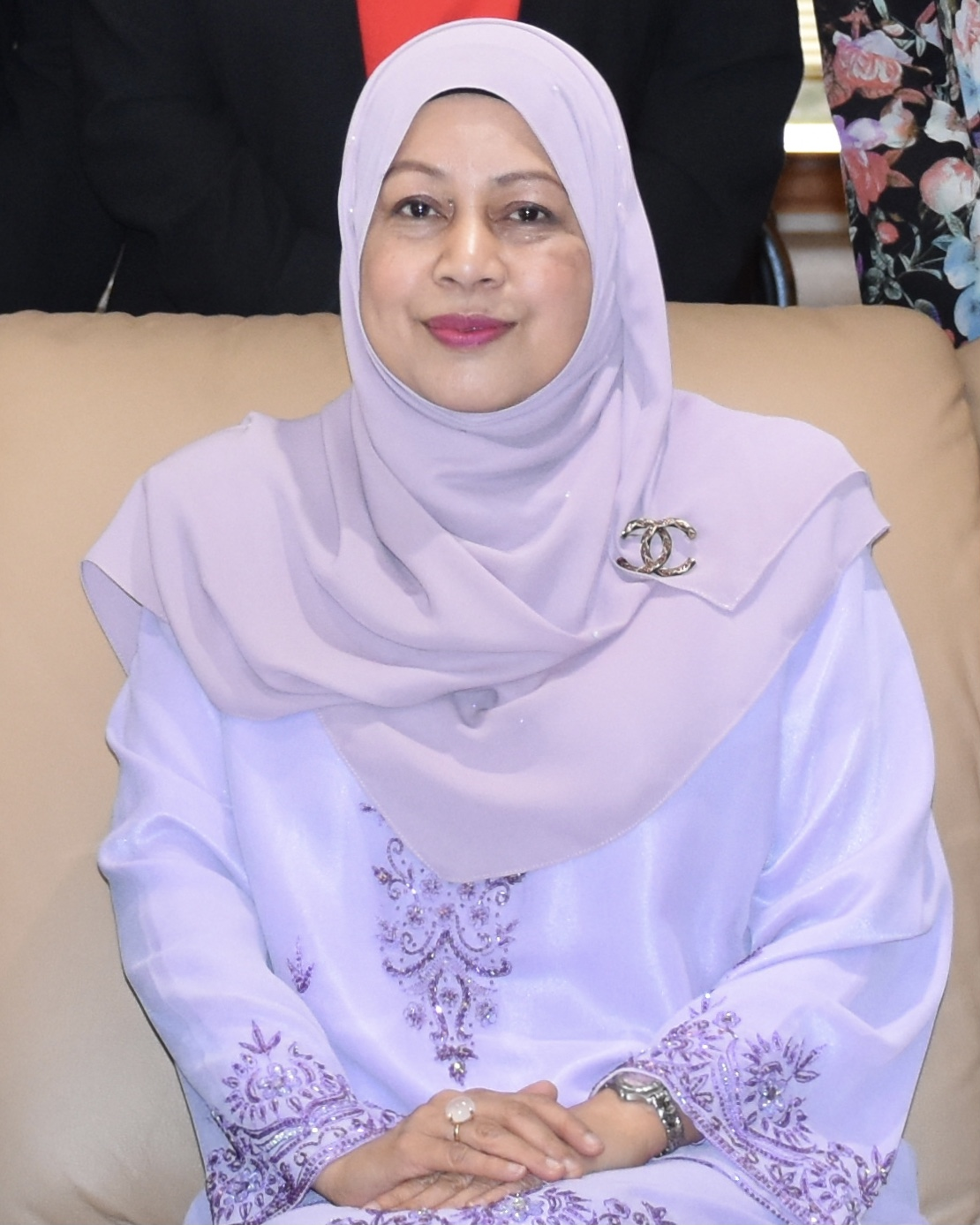
- Hayati in 2017

6th Attorney General of Brunei
- In office 4 August 2009 – 18 August 2018
- Monarch: Hassanal Bolkiah
- Preceded by: Kifrawi Kifli
- Succeeded by: Hairol Arni

Personal details
- Born: Brunei
- Parent: Salleh Masri (father)
- Education: Sultan Omar Ali Saifuddien College; University of Exeter (BA)
- Profession: Attorney; magistrate
- Known for: Overseeing sharia law implementation in Brunei

Hayati binti Haji Mohd Salleh (or simply Hayati Salleh) is a Bruneian magistrate and the first female Attorney General of Brunei, who served the office from 2009 to 2018. She is also the first female judge in Brunei, as well as the first female High Court Judge in the Supreme Court of Brunei. She is also the first Bruneian Malay woman to be called to the English Bar.

In addition to her judicial responsibilities, she serves on a number of committees, such as the Law Revision Committee, the National Education Council, and the "Badan Perencana Kemajuan Jangka Panjang," which is charged with developing Brunei's long-term development strategy and overseeing its implementation. She also serves as the working committee's chairman for the Legal Profession Act.

== Education ==
The Raja Isteri Fatimah Malay School (SMRIF), Raja Isteri Girls' High School (STPRI), and Sultan Omar Ali Saifuddien College in Brunei provided the foundational education for Hayati. After receiving a Brunei Government Scholarship in 1974, she continued on to complete her 'A' Levels at Exeter College of Further Education in the United Kingdom, eventually earning a Bachelor of Arts (Law) Degree from the University of Exeter in 1979. She became a certified Barrister-At-Law of Lincoln's Inn in 1980.

== Career ==
Hayati started working as a legal counsel and deputy public prosecutor in the Attorney General's Chambers. She thereafter moved to the State Judiciary Department where she served as a magistrate before becoming chief magistrate and deputy chief registrar of the Supreme Court, chief registrar and judge of the intermediate court, and judicial commissioner of the Supreme Court. She was the first woman to get such an honour when Sultan Hassanal Bolkiah appointed her as a High Court Judge on 1 January 2001. On 4 August 2009, she was once again the first woman to be selected as Attorney General. On 29 May 2010, that position was upgraded to a Ministerial status. She was a member of the cabinet in the reshuffles of 2005, 2010, 2015, and 2018.

She was responsible for overseeing the implementation of sharia law in Brunei. For Brunei's legal system, the 2013 implementation of the Sharia Penal Code Order represents a significant development. To provide justice in line with the due process of the law is the primary goal of criminal justice law. Criminal offenses have traditionally been subject to the civil courts' and religious courts' jurisdiction. The Sharia Penal Code gives sharia courts the authority to hear cases involving offenses against Islam, such as intoxicated drinking, failing to give zakat (alms), or disrespecting Ramadan.

On the request of Datin Hayati, Professor Cao Jianming visited Brunei for business from 24 to 26 November 2017. The Supreme People's Procuratorate and the Attorney General's Chambers of Brunei signed a joint statement after agreeing to further increase communication and collaboration between the two prosecutor offices. On 24 January 2018, the president of the Law Society of Brunei Darussalam, On Hung Zheng, paid Datin Hayati a courtesy call in the law building. They spoke about topics of mutual interest, including methods to improve the standard of legal services in Brunei Darussalam and potential avenues for collaboration.

On 9 August 2018, His Majesty has approved the appointment of Dato Hairol Arni as Attorney General to take the place of Datin Hayati in accordance with the Sultan of Brunei's directive.

== Personal life ==
Datin Hayati is the eldest daughter of aristocrat and politician, Pehin Orang Kaya Shahbandar Dato Seri Paduka Salleh.

== Awards and honours ==
On 15 July 1999, she was bestowed the title of Datin Paduka, also styled as Yang Berhormat (The Honourable). Her title was later promoted to Datin Seri Paduka on 15 July 2011. Throughout her career, Hayati has earned the following honours:

=== Awards ===
- Salute to Brunei Women Achievers Award (given by Asia Inc Forum; 2008)

=== Honours ===
Hayati has been given the following honours:

- Order of Seri Paduka Mahkota Brunei First Class (SPMB; 15 July 2011) – Datin Seri Paduka;
- Order of Seri Paduka Mahkota Brunei Second Class (DPMB; 15 July 1999) – Datin Paduka
- Meritorious Service Medal (PJK)
- Excellent Service Medal (PIKB)
- Long Service Medal (PKL)

Legal offices
Preceded by Kifrawi Kifli	6th Attorney General of Brunei; 4 August 2009 – 18 August 2018	Succeeded by Hairol Arni
