= Brunei–South Korea relations =

- Brunei: South Korea

Envoy
- Ambassador Pengiran Nooriyah: Ambassador Kim Soung-eun

Brunei and South Korea established diplomatic relations in 1984. Brunei has an embassy in Seoul, and South Korea has an embassy in Bandar Seri Begawan.

== History ==
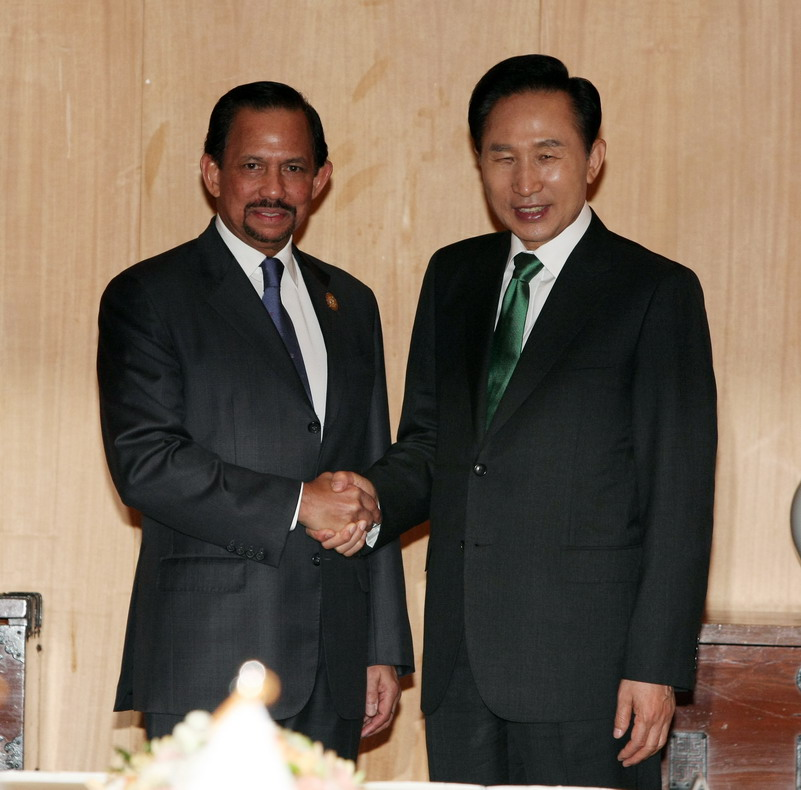
Korea-Brunei summit, President Lee Myung-bak (right) and Bruneian Sultan Hassanal Bolkiah on June 1, 2009.

South Korea established diplomatic relations with Brunei on 1 June 1984 right after the country gained independence from the United Kingdom on 1 January that year.

In 1986, Brunei was one of the countries that boycotted the Asian Games, straining the relations. In 2012, the Bruneian Minister of Education attended the fifth Asia-Pacific Economic Cooperation (APEC) and made a working visit to South Korea. While on the same year, the Korean Deputy Minister of Construction and Water Resources Policy visit Brunei.

== Economic relations ==
Many Korean companies operate and invest in Brunei. Several memorandum of understanding (MoU) on agricultures and fisheries have also been signed. Both countries are also working on in the areas of information technology and tourism. South Korea also keen on helping Bruneians to promote their small and medium enterprises (SME) products in the tourism sector. Some South Korean cosmetics companies have interest in working with Brunei to manufacture halal cosmetics for the regional market and other South Korean companies such as on food also use Brunei halal certification by establishing relations with the Brunei halal companies to export their food products to the Middle East.
