= Pengiran Nooriyah =

Bruneian diplomat

Yang Berhormat Pengiran Nooriyah
- ڤڠيرن نورايه

Ambassador of Brunei to South Korea
- Incumbent
- Assumed office May 2019
- Preceded by: Harun Ismail

Personal details
- Born: Dayangku Nooriyah binti Pengiran Haji Yussof Bandar Seri Begawan, Brunei
- Parent(s): Pengiran Yussof (father); Pengiran Siti Hadizah (mother)
- Occupation: Diplomat

Pengiran Hajah Nooriyah binti Pengiran Haji Yussof is a Bruneian diplomat who became the incumbent ambassador to South Korea since 2019, and the former head of mission at the Consulate General of Brunei in Kota Kinabalu. She is also among the Honorary Ambassador Members of the Asia Society Korea.

== Diplomatic career ==
Earlier in her career, she served as a research officer for the Political Department of the Ministry of Foreign Affairs.

Christina Liew met with Pengiran Nooriyah to talk about possible cooperation with Brunei Darussalam Tourism to boost tourism growth on 3 October 2018. Tourist attractions in her nation, according to her, include Jerudong Park, Taman Mahkota, Ulu Temburong National Park, Kampong Ayer, mosques, a water-themed park, and lakes. Kota Kinabalu, she says, is a favorite holiday destination for Bruneians, especially during the school holidays and in December.

On 15 April 2019, Prince Al-Muhtadee Billah greeted newly appointed Brunei envoys, including Pengiran Nooriyah as Brunei's Ambassador to the Republic of Korea. On that same day, she was presented her letter of credentials from Sultan Hassanal Bolkiah at Istana Nurul Iman. The Grand Consulate of Brunei, Pengiran Nooriyah, paid a goodwill visit to Tun Juhar Mahiruddin and his wife, Norlidah, at Istana Seri Kinabalu on the 22nd. According to her, the purpose of the visit was to discuss with Juhar of her inauguration as the country's new ambassador to South Korea in May.

Pehin Dato Halbi led the Brunei delegation to the Seoul Defense Dialogue Forum (SDD 2023) and the Seoul International Aerospace and Defense Exhibition (ADEX) held in Seoul, from 17 to 22 October 2023, with Pengiran Nooriyah in attendance.

== Personal life ==
Pengiran Nooriyah is the daughter of nobleman Pengiran Lela Wijaya Pengiran Dato Seri Laila Jasa Haji Yussof (1917–2004), and his wife Pengiran Datin Hajjah Siti Hadizah, of which both were descendants of the royal family. She has a total of 10 brothers and 4 sisters, which included Pengiran Menudin. She has previously held the title of Dayangku.

Diplomatic posts
Preceded by Harun Ismail	Ambassador of Brunei to South Korea; May 2019 – present	Succeeded by Incumbent
