= Idris Talog Davies =

British judge (1917–1977)

Yang Dimuliakan Pehin Orang Kaya Laila Kanun Diraja Dato Laila Utama Idris Talog Davies CBE DK SPMB DSNB DPMB PHBS PJK PKL AK PJK (Trengganu)
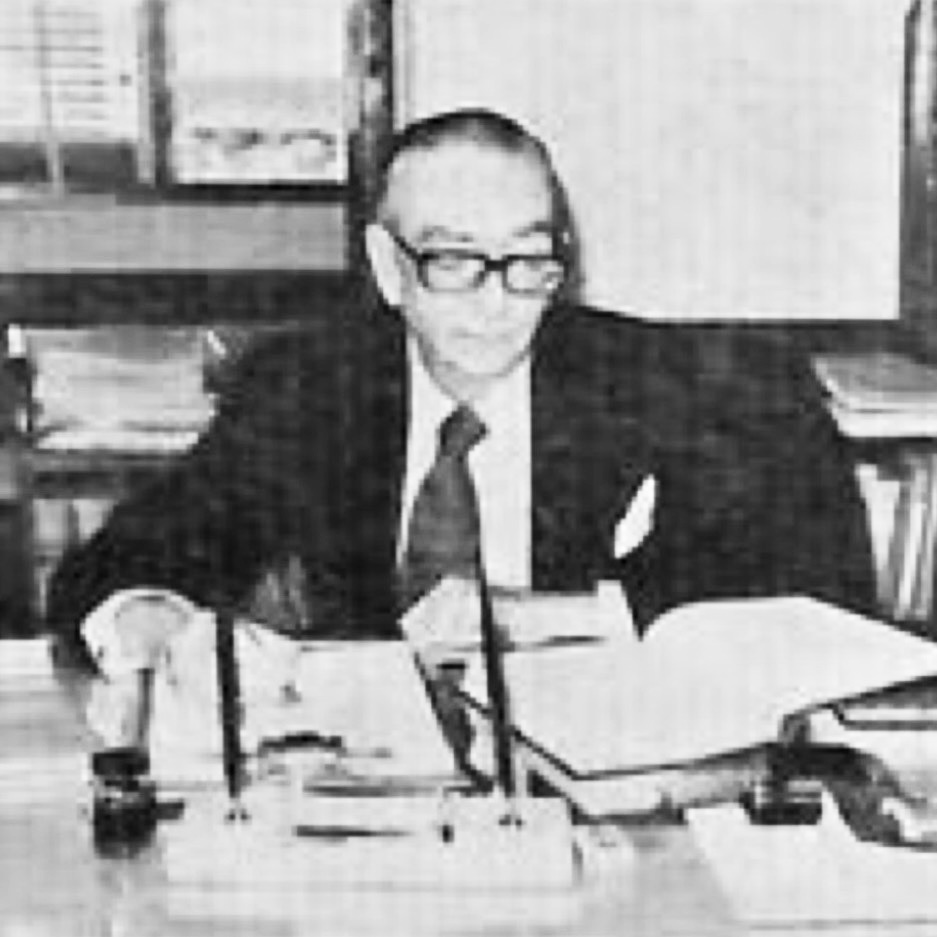
- Pehin Davies in 1973

3rd Attorney General of Brunei
- In office 15 January 1963 – 22 July 1977
- Monarchs: Omar Ali Saifuddien III; Hassanal Bolkiah
- Preceded by: Abdul Aziz Zain
- Succeeded by: Pengiran Bahrin

Personal details
- Born: 1 July 1917
- Died: 21 July 1977 (aged 60) Attorney General's Chambers, Bandar Seri Begawan, Brunei
- Resting place: Llanrhydd Cemetery
- Education: University of Cambridge
- Occupation: Judge

Idris Talog Davies CBE (1 July 1917 – 21 July 1977) was a British judge who served in several high-ranking positions which included being appointed as a member of the Brunei Privy Council and the Brunei Attorney General. Notably, he was among the Advisory Editorial Board for the Malayan Law Journal, and a lifetime member of the Malaysian Historical Society.

== Career ==
After graduating from Cambridge University, Davies joined the Colonial Legal Service's Malayan Judicial and Legal Service on 20 September 1951. He worked in Kuala Lumpur as a federal counsel and deputy public prosecutor, among other positions. He later became the legal adviser to the State of Perlis until 1 October 1952. As of 1 January 1962, he became the senior federal counsel at the Attorney-General's Chambers of the Federation of Malaya.

On 15 January 1963, Davies was appointed as Brunei's Attorney General. Later on 3 February, he was among the Pengiran Ali-led delegation flown to Kuala Lumpur to attend the Federation of Melayu Raya meeting. The Legislative Council and Davies declared in January 1977 that anybody discovered in possession of lottery tickets or gambling establishments might be fined up to B$5,000 or imprisoned for a year. Anyone found guilty of the crime might face penalties under Chapter 26 of the Public Gambling House Bill (Amendment) 1976.

On 21 July 1977, Davies died in office at the Attorney General's Chambers. Brunei recorded his passing a day later on the 22nd, and be succeeded by Pengiran Bahrin. He is buried at Llanrhydd Cemetery, Ruthin.

== Legacy ==
=== Things named after him ===
- Jalan Idris Talog, a road in Tutong Camp

=== Titles ===
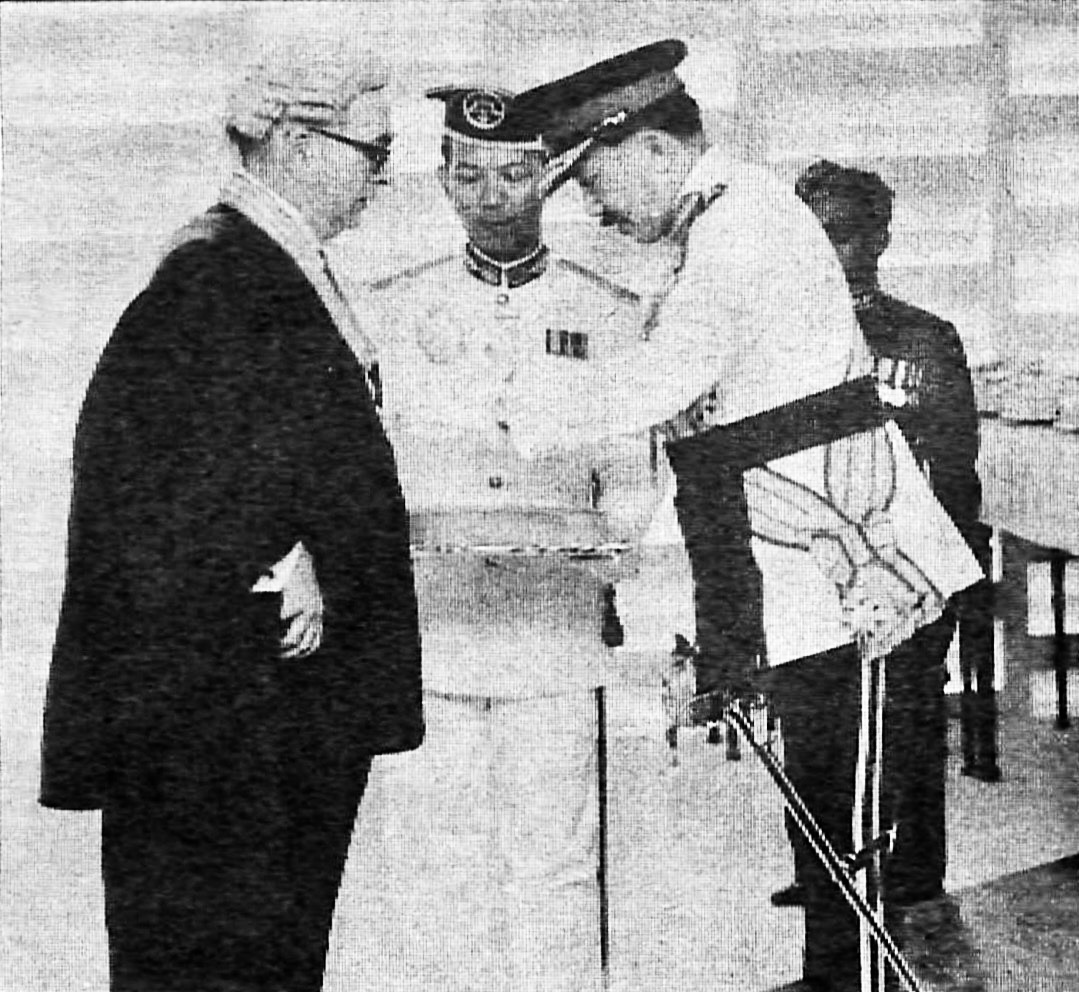
Davies being awarded the DSNB by Sultan Omar Ali Saifuddien III in 1966

Davies was bestowed the Manteri title of Yang Dimuliakan Pehin Orang Kaya Laila Kanun Diraja by Sultan Omar Ali Saifuddien III on 22 January 1970.

=== Honours ===
National

As part of the 1968 Queen Elizabeth's New Year's honours, he was named a Commander of the Order of the British Empire (CBE). He has earned the following honours;

- Commander of the Order of the British Empire (CBE; 1968); Officer (OBE; 1962)

Foreign

- Brunei:
  - Order of Laila Utama First Class (DK) – Dato Laila Utama
  - Order of Seri Paduka Mahkota Brunei First Class (SPMB) – Dato Seri Paduka
  - Order of Seri Paduka Mahkota Brunei Second Class (DPMB) – Dato Paduka
  - Order of Setia Negara Brunei Second Class (DSNB; 1966) – Dato Setia
  - Order of Setia Negara Brunei Third Class (SNB)
  - Sultan Hassanal Bolkiah Medal (PHBS)
  - Pingat Bakti Laila Ikhlas (PBLI; 1976)
  - Meritorious Service Medal (PJK)
- Malaysia:
  - Ahli Kelantan (AK)
  - Terengganu Meritorious Service Medal (PJK)

Legal offices
Preceded by Abdul Aziz Zain	3rd Attorney General of Brunei; 15 January 1963 – 22 July 1977	Succeeded by Pengiran Bahrin
