= Ahmad Isa =

Bruneian lawyer

Dato Seri Paduka Ahmad Isa SPMB
- احمد عيسى
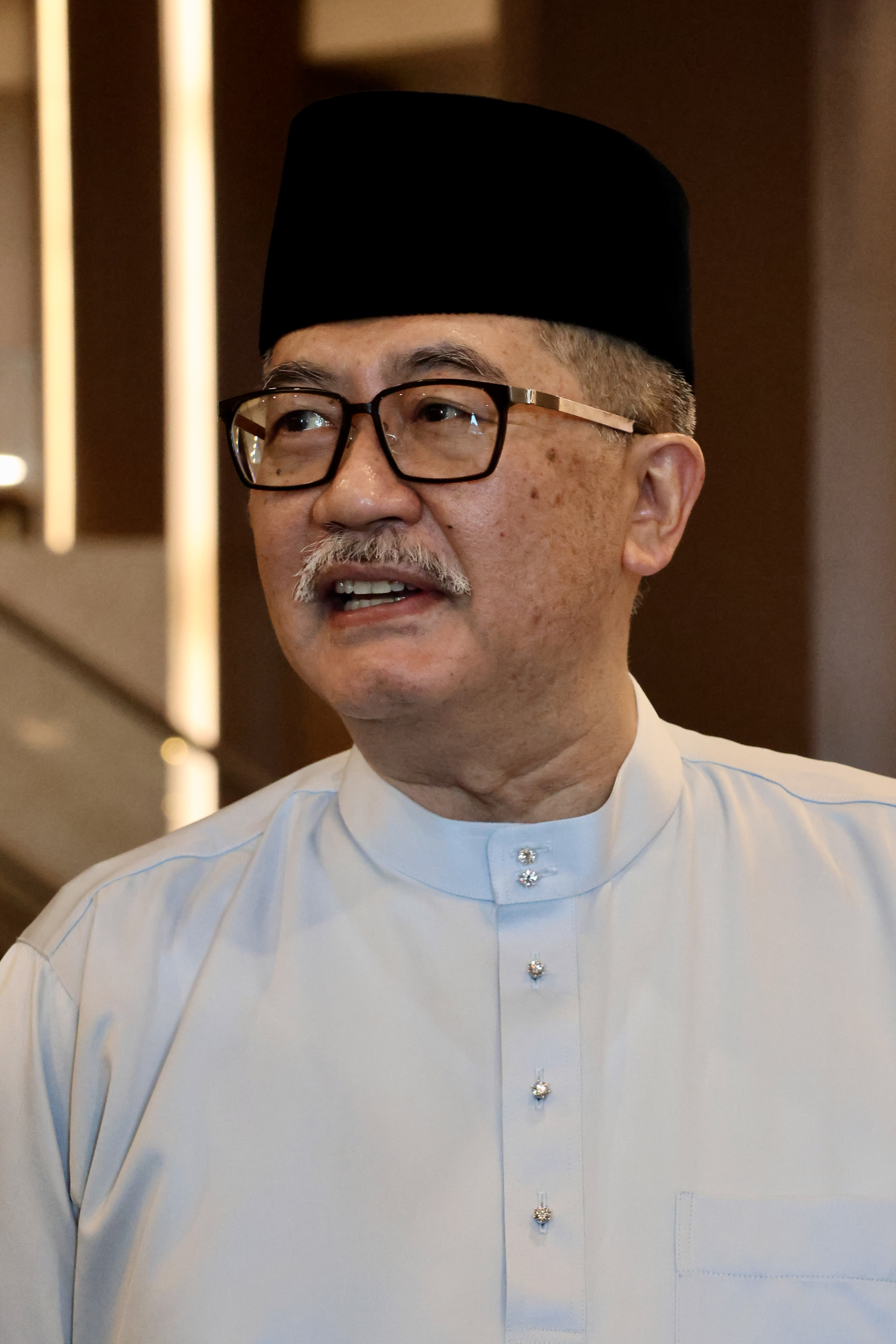
- Ahmad in 2024

8th Attorney General of Brunei
- In office 6 October 2020 – 29 February 2024
- Monarch: Hassanal Bolkiah
- Preceded by: Hairol Arni
- Succeeded by: Nor Hashimah Taib

Personal details
- Born: Brunei
- Spouse: Faridah Yussof
- Children: Nur 'Azizah
- Parent(s): Isa Ibrahim (father); Rosnah Abdullah (mother)
- Relatives: Ibrahim Mohammad Jahfar (grandfather); Abbas Al-Sufri (uncle); Musa Adnin (cousin)
- Education: United World College of South East Asia; University of Kent (BA)
- Profession: Lawyer

Ahmad bin Haji Isa (/ˈɑːmæd/) is a Bruneian lawyer who served as the eighth Attorney General of Brunei from 2020 to 2024. He practices in the fields of criminal prosecution and defense work, aviation, international law, business and commercial law, banking, real estate, joint ventures, and intellectual property. He is also the chairman of the International School Brunei (ISB) Board of Directors, the director of AEGIS Secure Solutions, and member of the Universiti Brunei Darussalam (UBD) council. In November 2022, he was appointed Vice President of the Brunei Darussalam Swimming Association (BDSA).

== Education ==
Ahmad graduated from the United World College of South East Asia (UWCSEA) and obtained his Bachelor of Arts (Hons) in Law from the University of Kent, United Kingdom from 1982 to June 1985. He began work as a counsel and deputy public prosecutor at the Attorney General's Chamber from Sep 1985 to November 1990. He graduated from Universiti Malaya in Malaysia in 1986 with a Certificate of Legal Practice, and in 1987 he was admitted as an Advocate and Solicitor of the Supreme Court of Brunei Darussalam. In 1994, he was chosen to serve as a Commissioner of Oaths.

== Career ==
Ahmad held the positions of Counsel and Deputy Public Prosecutor, Deputy Registrar of Trade Marks, Deputy Registrar of Companies, and Deputy Registrar of Business Names in the Attorney General's Chambers (AGC) between 1985 and 1990. He was attached to the Ministry of Foreign Affairs in addition to his responsibilities in the AGC from 1986 until October 1990. In November 1990, after leaving the government, he joined Douglas Lind Ahmad Isa & Co. as a partner. Douglas Lind Ahmad Isa & Co. and Ibrahim Chee & Co. amalgamated to establish Ahmad Isa Lee & Lind in January 1992. In November 1997, Ahmad Isa Lee & Lind became Ahmad Isa & Partners.

According to a broadcast on Radio Televisyen Brunei (RTB) on 5 October 2020 night, Ahmad has been named the next attorney general of Brunei. He succeeds Dato Hairol Arni, who was replaced as interim attorney general in July by Zuraini Sharbawi. On 27 July, the Sultan's ministry unexpectedly terminated the latter's services without giving a reason. On 6 October 2020, Sultan Hassanal Bolkiah officially appointed him.

Along with representatives from 30 Commonwealth member nations, Attorney General Ahmad attended the High-Level Meeting of the Commonwealth Law Ministers on 18 February 2021. The primary legal issues raised by the COVID-19 pandemic in the Commonwealth, including ensuring that everyone has access to justice, upholding the rule of law in the fight against the pandemic, and the legal obstacles to equitable access to life-saving medications, including vaccines and equipment, were on the agenda.

As part of the S R Nathan Fellowship, Dr. Vivian Balakrishnan invited Dato Ahmad Isa to visit Singapore from 15 to 17 February 2023. Lawrence Wong, Teo Chee Hean, Vivian Balakrishnan, and Edwin Tong all met with Dato Ahmad. Additionally, he has meetings with Sundaresh Menon and Lucien Wong planned. He went to briefings on the legal system, took tours of the Supreme Court, the Singapore Intellectual Property Office, the National University of Singapore's Faculty of Law, and the Centre for International Law.

On 28 February 2024, it was officially announced that he would be succeeded by Nor Hashimah, and would come into effect on the following day.

== Personal life ==
Ahmad is the son of Isa Ibrahim and Rosnah Abdullah, making him the grandson of Ibrahim Mohammad Jahfar. He is married to Faridah Yussof, and together they have a daughter, Nur 'Azizah, who holds the distinction of being the first female president of the Law Society of Brunei.

== Honours ==
Ahmad has earned the following honours;

- Order of Seri Paduka Mahkota Brunei First Class (SPMB) – Dato Seri Paduka (15 July 2022)

Legal offices
Preceded by Hairol Arni	8th Attorney General of Brunei; 6 October 2020 – 29 February 2024	Succeeded by Nor Hashimah Taib
