= Goh King Chin =

Bruneian businessperson and politician (born 1943)

Yang Dimuliakan Pehin Kapitan Lela Diraja Dato Paduka Goh King Chin DPMB PHBS PJK
- 吳景進
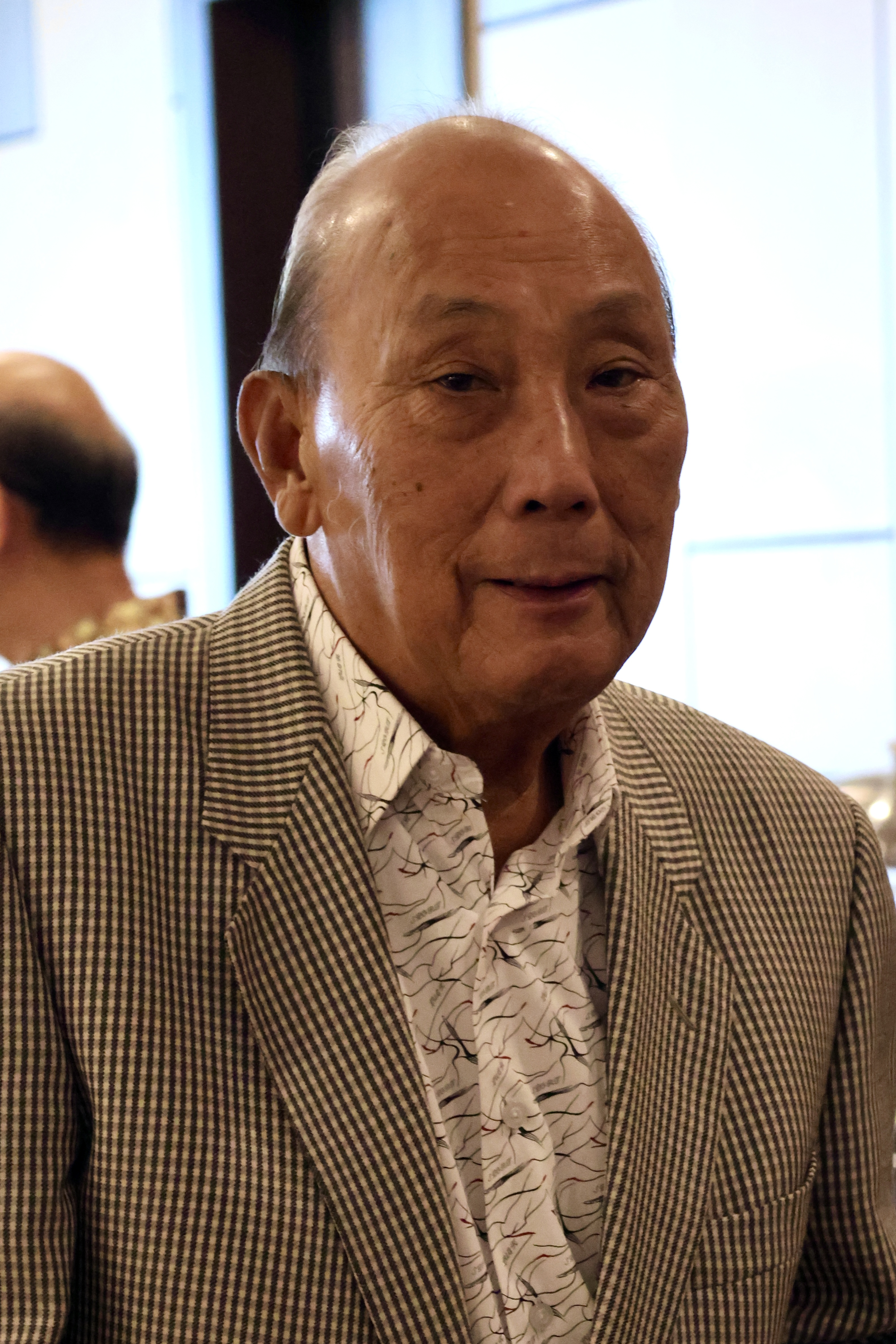
- Pehin Goh in 2024

Member of the Legislative Council
- In office 1 June 2011 – 11 February 2015
- In office 6 September 2004 – 15 March 2011

Personal details
- Born: 1 January 1943 (age 83) Tutong, Brunei
- Spouse: Chang Nyuk Kee (m. 1967)
- Relations: Goh Kiat Chun (nephew)
- Children: 4; including Jack Goh
- Parent: Goh Hock Kee (father)
- Education: Chung Hwa School, Tutong
- Alma mater: Sultan Omar Ali Saifuddien College
- Occupation: Businessman; philanthropist; politician

Chinese name
- Simplified Chinese: 吴景进
- Traditional Chinese: 吳景進
Transcriptions
Standard Mandarin
- Hanyu Pinyin: Wú Jǐngjìn
Southern Min
- Hokkien POJ: Gô͘ Kéng-chìn

Goh King Chin (Chinese: 吳景進; pinyin: Wú Jǐngjìn; Pe̍h-ōe-jī: Gô͘ Kéng-chìn; born 1 January 1943) or also simply known as Pehin Goh, is a Bruneian aristocrat, politician and businessperson of Chinese descent who is thought to be a multimillionaire and well-known philanthropist. He presently serves as the managing director of the Goh Hock Kee (GHK) Group of Companies, which comprises GHK Motors, GHK Auto Assembly, and MBA Insurance. In addition to serving as an advisor to the Hokkien Association, the Chung Hwa Middle School in Bandar Seri Begawan, and the Tutong District. Notably, he was formerly the vice-chairman of the now-defunct The Brunei Times.

== Early life and education ==
Goh King Chin, born on 1 January 1943 in Tutong District, is the eldest of eight siblings. His father, Goh Hock Kee, (Note: Goh Hock Kee was born in Lieyu, Kinmen.) was a shareholder in the company Chop Hock Kee in Tutong. Goh began his education at Chung Hua School in Tutong before continuing his studies at Sultan Omar Ali Saifuddien College, a prestigious institution at the time. He was a classmate of then-Prince Hassanal Bolkiah, Abu Bakar Apong and Eusoff Agaki Ismail. After graduating from the college, Goh worked as a customs and excise officer in the government sector from 1964 to 1970.

== Business career ==
In 1970, Goh King Chin left his government role to establish GHK Motors, a company specializing in importing reconditioned secondhand cars, mainly from Europe, the United States, and Japan. Over the years, GHK Motors evolved into a leading player in Brunei’s automotive industry, earning Goh a solid reputation as a successful entrepreneur. Named after his father, Goh Hock Kee, the company initially dealt in vehicles and spare parts. It later became the agent for renowned car brands like Daihatsu, Mitsubishi, and Daewoo, as well as manufacturers from Europe and China. Goh's vision of providing high-quality used vehicles to Brunei’s growing automotive market quickly paid off. Starting with just one mechanic, GHK Motors earned a reputation for supplying "Quality Used Cars" within a few years. Building on this success, Goh expanded the business to include new car models. In 1973, his company secured rights to sell Daihatsu vehicles in Brunei, and by 1979, GHK Motors had become the sole distributor for Mitsubishi cars and trucks, further cementing its leadership in the market.

In 1990, Goh restructured his business into GHK Motors, embracing an international business model. To further expand, he invested in ventures such as the GHK Auto Assembly Plant, Brunei's first commercial vehicle prefabrication factory, which officially opened on 31 July 2000, marking a pivotal moment in the nation's automotive industry. In 2003, Goh strengthened his business portfolio by acquiring full ownership of MBA Insurance Company and integrating it into the GHK Group of Companies. In recognition of his leadership, he was appointed vice-chairman of the Brunei Times in 2007.

Along with his commercial achievements, Goh has been a community leader. Up until 1994, he was a director of the Chamber of Commerce, and he is still a director today. In keeping with his dedication to education and community development, he also serves as an honorary adviser to Chung Hua School in Tutong and Chung Hwa Middle School, Bandar Seri Begawan.

== Political career ==
Pehin Goh was appointed on 6 September 2004, and served on the Legislative Council (LegCo) until 15 March 2011. Borneo Bulletin formally declared on 31 May 2011, that he will join the Legislative Council, effective 1 June. While serving on the LegCo, he frequently attended conferences for the Asia Pacific Parliamentary Forum (APPF) and the ASEAN Inter-Parliamentary Assembly (AIPA). During a LegCo Meeting in 2016, Pehin Goh affirmed the nation's faith and the Melayu Islam Beraja (MIB) national concept by asserting that the nation can overcome the current international issue that is harming it. He further stated that Brunei had previously experienced difficulties related to the drop in oil prices.

=== Worker shortages ===
Although Brunei has up to 7000 persons listed as unemployed, a lack of workers is another obstacle to the growth of the country's industries. Increased national skill development, in the opinion of Pehin Goh, is one approach to lower unemployment while boosting the domestic manufacturing industry. He stated as much in a speech to the LegCo in mid-March 2011, "With limits on how many jobseekers the public sector can absorb, it is essential that efforts be made to meet the labour needs of the private sector industries the government is trying to encourage."

=== Statelessness ===
Pehin Goh stated during a 2005 Legislative Council Meeting that the Chinese community admires the Sultan's leadership and credits his rule for the peace and tranquility they enjoy. He reaffirmed the community's support and respect for Brunei's Islamic principles and governance, and he asked that officials make it easier for Chinese people who were born there to become citizens. Goh also promoted giving foreign investors permanent residence (PR) status, claiming that this would boost small and medium-sized business expansion and attract more financial investment to Brunei. According to Adanan Yusof of the Ministry of Home Affairs, foreign spouses and their children can apply for citizenship, and he noted that between 1958 and 2005, 42,600 individuals were granted permanent resident status, while emphasising that each country has its own distinct immigration laws.

Pehin Goh suggested that Chinese citizens who were born in Brunei be awarded citizenship automatically when they turn fifty-five. He stated on the sixth day of the 2005 Legislative Council Meeting that the Sultan's leadership was the reason for the peace and harmony that the Chinese community in Brunei enjoys. He underlined that in addition to helping the country prosper, Bruneian Chinese held the Sultan, the administration, and the Islamic policies in high regard and supported them. Goh asked the appropriate authorities to take into account his suggestion to make it easier for Chinese residents to become citizens.

Pehin Goh advocated that foreign males who are married to Bruneian women be given PR status in addition to his recommendations for investors, citing the fact that some of these couples had been married for more than 20 years without it. The Ministry of Home Affairs described the conditions for PR holders to petition for citizenship and stated that more than 42,600 persons had been given PR status between 1958 and 2005. At the 9th Legislative Council Session in 2013, Goh had previously expressed concerns about the difficulties stateless people in Brunei experience, especially with regard to travel abroad and property ownership.

Pehin Goh, a prominent advocate for the Chinese-Bruneian community and a member of the LegCo, proposed changes to the country's citizenship laws on 12 March 2016. He suggested that stateless individuals born in Brunei should be granted citizenship once they reach fifty-five years of age. Goh stressed that prior to independence, all Bruneians held British passports, but after independence, only those of Malay ancestry were automatically given citizenship. The Minister of Home Affairs, Abu Bakar Apong, responded by noting that the Brunei Nationality Act of 1961 predates the country's independence, and that Chinese-Bruneians had the opportunity to apply for a faster citizenship process during the transition to independence in 1984.

== Philanthropy ==
Goh is actively involved in various community-benefiting initiatives. In 2003, he donated B$2.6 million to construct hawker stalls in Kampong Beribi, Gadong, aimed at supporting impoverished and disadvantaged residents. Having lived in Kampong Jangsak for over 30 years, he has witnessed significant changes in traffic patterns, particularly during rush hours, due to the development of a nearby school and mosque. His contributions also facilitated the construction of a pedestrian bridge over the road in front of Seri Mulia Sarjana School. On 20 May 2022, in recognition of the Royal Brunei Armed Forces' 61st anniversary, Goh further demonstrated his commitment to the community by presenting the armed forces with a sponsorship that included 1,000 face masks and 500 bottles of hand sanitizers.

== Personal life ==
Pehin Goh is married to Datin Chang Nyuk Kee, and together they have two sons and two daughters. Their son, Jack Goh Kiat Hing, holds the position of director in the family company. Their daughters, Poh Ling and Poh Yeek, are also involved in its administration. Goh has a nephew, Wu Chun, who is an internationally recognised multi-entrepreneur and artist. At his home in Kampong Sungai Besar, Pehin Goh is known for hosting open houses during Chinese New Year, bringing together family and friends in celebration. Additionally, amid the COVID-19 pandemic in Brunei, he was among the first elderly citizens to receive the initial vaccination dosage, demonstrating his commitment to public health and safety.

== Titles, styles and honours ==
In April 2004, Goh was bestowed by Sultan Hassanal Bolkiah the Manteri title of Pehin Kapitan Lela Diraja. Additionally, referred to by Yang Dimuliakan or Yang Berhormat in honorific. Additionally, he has earned the following honours:

- Order of Seri Paduka Mahkota Brunei Second Class (DPMB; 15 July 2006) – Dato Paduka
- Order of Seri Paduka Mahkota Brunei Third Class (SMB)
- Sultan Hassanal Bolkiah Medal (PHBS; 15 July 2006)
- Meritorious Service Medal (PJK)
- Asia Pacific Enterprise Awards (APEA) Special Achievement Award (2008)
