= Asia Inc. =

Singapore-based magazine

- Type: Business Periodical
- Format: Magazine
- Owner: Tong Kooi Ong
- Publisher: Tan Boon Kean
- Editor-in-chief: Ho Kay Tat
- Editor: Lee Pang Chuan
- Founded: 1992
- Language: English
- Headquarters: Singapore
- ISSN: 1019-2239
- Website: www.asia-inc.com

Asia Inc. is an international business magazine in Asia with world-wide distribution. Based in Singapore, it is primarily focused on Asian business issues. The magazine is a strategic partner of the APEC CEO summit. In addition to articles, Asia Inc. periodically publishes rankings of Asian business school MBA programs.

== History ==
Asia Inc was established in 1992. The magazine has long stood out as a new publishing voice of Asia.

Asia Inc’s many exclusive interviews with Asian leaders have included former CCP General Secretary Jiang Zemin of China, Prime Minister Mahathir Mohamad of Malaysia, Prime Minister Thaksin Shinawatra of Thailand and His Majesty, The Sultan of Brunei. Business figures from some of the region’s top multinationals interviewed have included Carlos Ghosn of Nissan Motor Company, Lee Hsien Yang of SingTel, James Riady of Indonesia’s Lippo Group, Dr. Jeffrey Koo of Taiwan’s Chinatrust Bank and Teresita Sy of the Philippines’ SM Group.

Apart from established personalities, Asia Inc’s appeal lies in its ability to seek out the new generation of leaders and decision makers in Asia.

Asia Inc has been closely aligned to the Asia Pacific’s premier business event as Media Partner since the inaugural summit in Manila in 1996. Its presence in the last three Summits - Brunei in 2000, China in 2001 and Mexico in 2002 - has been the most prominent of all international media.

The annual APEC CEO Summit is unique in that no other regional business event takes place with the assured participation of the President of the United States, Prime Minister of Japan, President of China, President of Russia and many of the other leaders of the 21 economies that comprise the Asia Pacific Economic Cooperation Forum known as APEC.

In 2003, Asia Inc continued its close partnership with APEC as the Official Media Partner of the APEC CEO Summit in Bangkok, Thailand.

This prominent role of Asia Inc affirms its status as a serious and required read by the Who's Who of Asia and those interested in Asian affairs.

== Management ==
Asia Inc was formerly owned by Thai media tycoon Sondhi Limthongkul. The magazine is owned by The Edge Asia Inc Media Group, a regional business and investment news media group with publishing titles in Malaysia, Singapore, and Hong Kong. The combined and in-depth resources of The Edge Asia Inc Media Group provide Asia Inc with the reach as well as rich content to be the leading Asian monthly magazine.
