= Zasia Sirin =

Bruneian politician (born 1956)

Datin Paduka Zasia Sirin DPMB SSUB PIKB
- زاسيا بنت سيرين

Member of the Legislative Council
- In office 1 June 2011 – 11 February 2015

Personal details
- Born: Zasia binti Sirin; 24 September 1956 (age 70) Brunei
- Education: Al-Azhar University (BA; MA); National University of Malaysia (MA)
- Occupation: Politician; civil servant

Zasia binti Sirin (born 24 September 1956) is a Bruneian former politician. In 2011 she was one of the first two women appointed to the Legislative Council (LegCo), serving as a member until 2016.

== Biography ==
Zasia was born in Brunei in 1956. She earned a BA and an MA in Islamic studies at Al-Azhar University in Egypt. After returning to Brunei, she entered the civil service in 1980, initially working as a religious officer in three schools. She gained another master's degree in Islamic Studies (Dakwah and Leadership) from the National University of Malaysia, and served as director of the Islamic Dakwah Center from 2004 to 2006, She was also Head of Policy, Planning and Research at the Ministry of Religious Affairs.

On 31 May 2011, Zasia was appointed to the Legislative Council as a representative of 'people who have achieved excellence', taking office the following day. She and Salbiah Sulaiman were the first female members of the LegCo.

== Awards and honours ==
Zasia has received the following awards and honours:

=== Awards ===
- 2022 Meritorious Teacher Award

=== Honours ===
- Order of Seri Paduka Mahkota Brunei Second Class (DPMB) – Datin Paduka
- Order of Islam Brunei Third Class (SSUB)
- Excellent Service Medal (PIKB)
