= Pengiran Bahrin =

Bruneian magistrate and politician (born 1946)

Yang Amat Mulia Pengiran Laila Kanun Diraja Pengiran Bahrin DK PSNB PHBS PKL
- ڤڠيرن بهرين
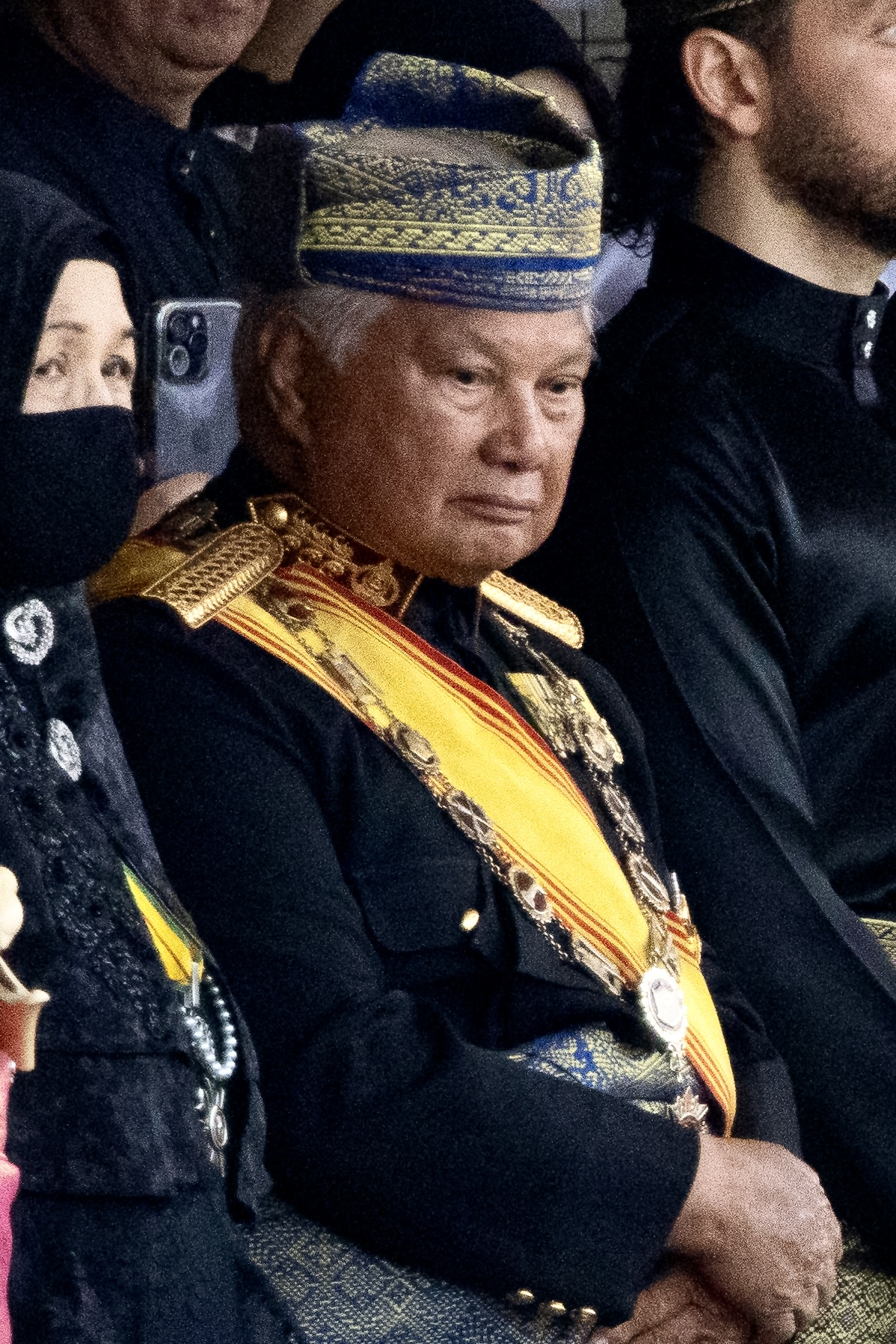
- Pengiran Bahrin in 2024

1st Minister of Communications
- In office 1 January 1984 – 20 October 1986
- Monarch: Hassanal Bolkiah
- Preceded by: Office established
- Succeeded by: Abdul Aziz Umar

4th Attorney General of Brunei
- In office 1 January 1978 – 24 June 1998
- Deputy: Isa Ibrahim
- Preceded by: Idris Talog Davies
- Succeeded by: Kifrawi Kifli

1st Minister of Law
- In office 1 January 1978 – 24 June 1998
- Preceded by: Office established
- Succeeded by: Office abolished

Personal details
- Born: Awangku Bahrin bin Pengiran Abbas; July 1946 (age 79)
- Spouse: Masni Ali
- Education: Sultan Omar Ali Saifuddien College; Millfield School
- Alma mater: Birmingham University (LLB); London University (LLM)
- Profession: Magistrate; politician

Pengiran Bahrin bin Pengiran Haji Abbas (Note: The earlier spelling of his given name was "Bahrain" rather than "Bahrin," while his patronymic was written as "Abas" instead of "Abbas.") (born July 1946) is a magistrate and noble politician in the government of Brunei. He previously served as the first minister of communications from 1984 to 1986, the first minister of law from 1984 to 1998, and as Brunei's fourth attorney general from 1978 to 1998.

== Early life and education ==
Awangku Bahrin bin Pengiran Abbas is born in July 1946. He received his early education at Jamalul Alam Malay School and Sultan Omar Ali Saifuddien College in Brunei. He later attended Millfield School and graduated from the Birmingham University with an LLB (Hons) in 1968. In 1969, he qualified as a barrister-at-law at Gray's Inn and became the first Bruneian to earn an LLM from London University in 1970.

== Career ==
On 1 January 1978, Pengiran Bahrin was appointed attorney general of Brunei, succeeding Idris Talog Davies. During the 15th session of the Legislative Council, he presented the Air Traffic Act of 1977, which was subsequently approved. The Act underscored Brunei's growing significance in regional aviation, notably following the official opening of Brunei International Airport in 1974 and the establishment of Royal Brunei Airlines (RBA) in 1975. Its purpose was to ensure that international aviation standards were adhered to within Brunei, as well as to facilitate the legal enforcement of international conventions concerning crimes committed aboard aircraft and to regulate air traffic and airport operations. This new legislation replaced the 1954 Air Traffic Act and introduced regulations for the use and upkeep of airports.

Following Brunei's full independence on 1 January 1984, Pengiran Bahrin was appointed minister of law and concurrently minister of communication. In 1985, he served as the Sultan Hassanal Bolkiah's special envoy, presenting a B$210,000 donation to the United Nations International School to commemorate both the United Nations' 40th anniversary and Brunei's first year as a member state. RBA was able to travel to Malé and beyond after Pengiran Bahrin and the Maldives inked an air services agreement on 3 May 1986, with the Maldives airlines receiving reciprocal rights. Later that year on 1 October, Pengiran Bahrin introduced the Legal Profession Act, which set out the criteria for admission to the Brunei Bar.

Following his father's death, the sultan announced a new cabinet on 20 October 1986 via Radio Television Brunei. This reorganisation created thirteen ministerial positions, including the appointment of Pengiran Bahrin as minister of law. Despite these changes, the sultan made it clear that government policies would remain unchanged. As minister of law, he introduced a cabinet-style government, which allowed department heads to report directly to their respective ministers, improving administrative efficiency. This system, tailored to Brunei's small population and size, offered both flexibility and effectiveness in governance.

In 1987, Pengiran Bahrin launched the 2,000th LNG cargo to Japan. Later that year, in July, Brunei, along with other Commonwealth nations, boycotted the Commonwealth Games in Edinburgh in protest against apartheid. On 2 October, Pengiran Bahrin, Brunei's representative to the United Nations General Assembly, strongly denounced apartheid, calling it "an evil system... degrading the dignity of mankind." However, reports later emerged that Brunei's oil shipments were still reaching South Africa despite a government ban. It was believed that the US$700 million worth of embargoed oil had been sold to South Africa via intermediaries, with much of it ending up at a Shell refinery in Durban. In response, Brunei Shell Petroleum vowed to investigate the matter.

Pengiran Bahrin announced that, effective 30 January 1991, Brunei's laws on the unlawful possession of weapons, including airguns and explosives, would be amended. The revised regulations introduced stricter penalties, replacing the previous maximum fine of $1,000 with imprisonment ranging from five to fifteen years and a minimum of three strokes of whipping. Additionally, amendments to the Public Order Act and the Internal Security Act imposed similar penalties for carrying offensive weapons in public, with sentences of up to fifteen years in prison and at least three strokes of whipping. These changes came into effect on 13 February 1991.

In 1992, Pengiran Bahrin led the introduction of several key legislative reforms. These included the Emergency (Kidnapping) Order, which granted police special investigative powers and mandated the death penalty for abduction for ransom. The Emergency (Intoxicating Substances) Order was also enacted, targeting glue sniffing and introducing provisions for rehabilitation and treatment. A legal presumption of trafficking was established for individuals found in possession of specified amounts of controlled substances, while the Misuse of Drugs Act was amended to revise penalties. Other significant laws included the Emergency (Islamic Banking) Order, which established Islamic banking in Brunei, and the Emergency (Tabung Amanah Pekerja) Order, which created a retirement benefits scheme for civil servants. Furthermore, new legislation allowed for production-sharing agreements in petroleum mining and granted the High Court jurisdiction over non-Muslim marriage dissolutions.

Pengiran Bahrin emphasised the urgent need for more students to pursue legal careers to fill critical roles within the attorney general's chambers and the judiciary. Despite recruiting several young lawyers in 1992, he noted that their numbers were still insufficient to fully meet the department's needs. Additionally, the use of Hong Kong judges in Brunei's high court raised concerns. Pengiran Bahrin highlighted potential inconsistencies between Hong Kong law and Brunei's judicial system, which is based on the Melayu Islam Beraja philosophy. He announced that the appointment of Hong Kong judges would be phased out before 1997.

In April 1993, Pengiran Bahrin travelled to Kuala Lumpur to attend the second meeting of ASEAN Ministers of Justice, Ministers of Law, and Attorneys-General. He highlighted the importance of defining the meeting's proper jurisdiction and recommended focusing on justice administration and law enforcement. Pengiran Bahrin noted that, apart from the Bali Ministerial Understanding, there were no formal ASEAN agreements promoting legal cooperation. He proposed bilateral arrangements for collaboration due to the differing legal systems among member states and stressed the need for a coordinated approach in areas governed by international conventions. During the meeting, Brunei presented a working paper on legal cooperation, which included the exchange of legal materials.

In 1995, Pengiran Bahrin introduced the Emergency (Perintah Nafkah Penguatkuasaan Timbal Balik) Order. Following the dismissal of Prince Jefri Bolkiah in 1998, he was removed from his position as minister of law, marking the end of his ministerial career. He resigned on 24 June 1998 and officially left the cabinet on 1 November 1998. After his departure, the Prime Minister's Office took control of the Ministry of Law. The sultan temporarily assumed responsibility for the law portfolio, and an acting attorney general and solicitor general were appointed. Pengiran Bahrin's resignation was believed to be linked to a power struggle driven by shifts in Brunei's political landscape. The rise of more conservative factions around the sultan, including Abdul Aziz Umar's appointment as acting head of the Brunei Investment Agency and the growing influence of Prince Mohamed Bolkiah, was seen as part of this transformation.

== Personal life ==
Pengiran Bahrin is married to Datin Hajah Masni binti Haji Mohammad Ali, who serves as the president of the Brunei Darussalam National Anti-Drug Association. The couple resides in Kampong Jerudong. Among their children is Pengiran Izad Ryan, who works as a counsel and holds the position of vice president of the Law Society of Brunei Darussalam.

== Titles, styles and honours ==
=== Titles and styles ===
On 21 March 1978, Pengiran Bahrin was honoured by Sultan Hassanal Bolkiah with the cheteria title of Pengiran Laila Kanun Diraja, bearing the style Yang Amat Mulia.

=== Honours ===
Pengiran Bahrin has been awarded the following honours:

- Order of Laila Utama (DK) – Dato Laila Utama
- Order of Setia Negara Brunei First Class (PSNB) – Dato Seri Setia
- Sultan Hassanal Bolkiah Medal (PHBS)
- Long Service Medal (PKL)
- Sultan of Brunei Golden Jubilee Medal (5 October 2017)

== Notes ==
Legal offices
Preceded by Idris Talog Davies	4th Attorney General of Brunei; 1 January 1978 – 24 June 1998	Succeeded by Kifrawi Kifli
Political offices
Preceded by Office established	1st Minister of Law; 1 January 1978 – 24 June 1998	Succeeded by Office abolished
Preceded by Office established	1st Minister of Communications; 1 January 1984 – 20 October 1986	Succeeded by Abdul Aziz Umar
