= Tan Bee Yong =

Bruneian diplomat and civil servant

Datin Paduka Tan Bee Yong DPMB
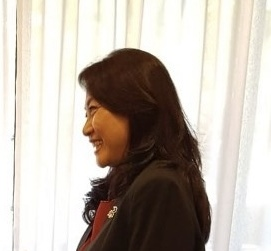
- Tan in 2018

High Commissioner of Brunei to New Zealand
- In office 2008–?

Ambassador of Brunei to Nordic Nations
- In office 2003–2008
- Succeeded by: Yunus Mahmud

Personal details
- Born: Brunei
- Spouse: Lim Jock Seng
- Occupation: Civil servant and diplomat

Tan Bee Yong is a retired Bruneian Chinese civil servant and diplomat in the Ministry of Foreign Affairs and Trade (MOFAT). She has been previously appointed to serve as the non-resident ambassador and high commissioner to several nations.

== Diplomatic career ==
Tan joined the MOFAT in 1984. From September 2002 until May 2005, she was the Asia–Europe Foundation (ASEF) Governor for Brunei Darussalam. She was also designated as Brunei Darussalam's non-resident ambassador to Nordic Nations (Finland, Sweden, Denmark, and Norway) from 2003 to 2008. She was appointed deputy permanent secretary of MOFAT in 2010 and promoted to permanent secretary in December 2011. Since 2008, she has served as Brunei Darussalam's non-resident high commissioner to New Zealand. As of 26 October 2022, she has since been retired.

=== New Zealand ===
On 9 April 2008, Prince Al-Muhtadee Billah gave his permission to meet with three of the Sultanate's recently designated envoys to friendly countries. Tan, the high commissioner to New Zealand, was one of the recently appointed envoys. She was cross-accredited from Bandar Seri Begawan to New Zealand. She and other diplomats went to Government House on Wednesday, 6 August 2008, at 11.20 a.m. to present their credentials to Governor-General Anand Satyanand. During the 30th anniversary of Brunei Darussalam and New Zealand's diplomatic relations' founding on 10 November 2014, it was celebrated with a reception held by Tan, with Todd McClay present as guest of honour.

== Personal life ==
Tan is married to an aristocrat and diplomat, Lim Jock Seng.

== Honours and recognitions ==
- Order of Seri Paduka Mahkota Brunei Second Class (DPMB; 15 July 2008) – Datin Paduka
- Inspire's The 50 Most Influential Women in Brunei (2014)
