= Mohamad Shuif Hussain =

- Born: Mohamad Shuif; 1967 (age 58–59)
- Education: Science School in Brunei
- Alma mater: Millfield, Leicester Polytechnic

Mohamad Shuif bin Mohd Hussain (born 1967) involved in The Strategic Iconic Assets Heritage Acquisition Fund (SIAHAF), in Liquidation . Hussain is one of the principals behind the recent acquisition of large parts of the Queensway district of West London with a view to the redevelopment of the area.

== Early life and education ==
Born in 1967, he was educated at the Science School in Brunei, followed by Millfield in Somerset, and Leicester Polytechnic.
