= Kifrawi Kifli =

Brunei chief justice

Dato Seri Paduka Kifrawi Kifli SPMB SNB PJK PIKB PKL
- كيفراوي كيفلي

4th Chief Justice of Brunei
- In office 4 August 2009 – 30 June 2018
- Nominated by: Hassanal Bolkiah
- Preceded by: Mohammad Saied
- Succeeded by: Steven Chong

5th Attorney General of Brunei
- In office 24 June 1998 – 4 August 2009
- Preceded by: Pengiran Bahrin
- Succeeded by: Hayati Salleh

Personal details
- Parent(s): Kifli Bujang (father); Rosni Abd Hamid (mother)
- Education: Gray's Inn; University of London
- Occupation: Attorney; magistrate

Kifrawi bin Haji Kifli is a Brunei magistrate who was appointed attorney general from 1998 to 2009, and the first local chief justice of the Supreme Court of Brunei Darussalam from 2009 to 2018.

== Career ==
Both Gray's Inn and the University of London provided him with his legal education. Kifrawi worked for the Bruneian government for twenty years, holding positions as Principal Counsel, Chief Registrar of the Supreme Court, Judge of the Intermediate Court, Probate Officer, Official Receiver, and Magistrate. He has been participating in the Asean Law Association from the 6th Governing Council Meeting at Cebu City, Philippines in November 1985.

On 1 February 1999, he was named Brunei Attorney-General, a role he retained until being named Chief Justice. On 4 August 2009, Sultan Hassanal Bolkiah named Kifrawi, 56, as Chief Justice, succeeding Mohammed Saied, whose time of office had come to an end. The Grand Chamberlain read the appointment letters at the start of the event, and then Kifrawi, the new Chief Justice, took the oath in front of the sultan. On 8 March 2014, marked the start of the 2014 legal year at the Supreme Court and High Court Building. The occasion commenced with Kifrawi inspecting the guard of honour from the RBPF.

Kifrawi participated in the Sixth ASEAN Chief Justices' Roundtable on Environment, which had as its topic "Forging the Sustainable Future of the ASEAN Region," from 10 to 13 November 2016. He was present at the 17th Conference of Chief Justices of Asia and the Pacific in September 2017. In 2018, the Law Society of Brunei Darusalam has advocated for the creation of a legal aid fund in order to increase the accessibility of justice for "underserved and disadvantaged" elements of society. The Law Society's decision to reopen its legal clinic, according to Kifrawi, was a significant step toward enhancing access to justice. Kifrawi, who has held the position of top judge in the nation for over nine years, was replaced by Steven Chong on 30 June 2018.

== Personal life ==
Kifrawi is the son of Dato Paduka Kifli bin Bujang, a teacher who received the Anugerah Guru Berjasa (Meritorious Teacher Award). He has a sister named Norlia, an employee at BLNG.

== Honours ==
Kifrawi has earned the following honours;

- Order of Seri Paduka Mahkota Brunei First Class (SPMB) – Dato Seri Paduka
- Order of Setia Negara Brunei Third Class (SNB)
- Meritorious Service Medal (PJK)
- Excellent Service Medal (PIKB)
- Long Service Medal (PKL)

Legal offices
Preceded by Mohammad Saied	4th Chief Justice of Brunei; 4 August 2009 – 30 June 2018	Succeeded by Steven Chong
Preceded by Pengiran Bahrin	5th Attorney General of Brunei; 24 June 1998 – 4 August 2009	Succeeded by Hayati Salleh
