= Salbiah Sulaiman =

Bruneian politician (born 1952)

Datin Paduka Salbiah Sulaiman DPMB SNB PJK PKL
- صلبيه بنت سليمان
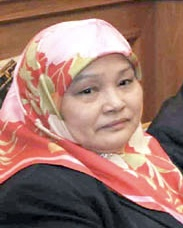
- Salbiah in 2016

Member of the Legislative Council
- In office 1 June 2011 – 11 February 2015
- Monarch: Hassanal Bolkiah

Personal details
- Born: Salbiah binti Sulaiman; 5 August 1952 (age 74) Bandar Seri Begawan, Brunei
- Education: Sultan Omar Ali Saifuddien College; University of East Anglia (BA)
- Occupation: Politician; civil servant

Salbiah binti Haji Sulaiman (born 5 August 1952) is a Bruneian former politician who served as a member of the Legislative Council (LegCo) from 2011 to 2016.

== Biography ==
Salbiah was born in Brunei in 1952. She was educated at Berakas primary school, Raja Isteri Girls' High School (STPRI) and Sultan Omar Ali Saifuddien College. She then attended the Oxford College of Further Education in the United Kingdom, before earning a BA in social studies from the University of East Anglia in 1978.

Salbiah started her career in 1978 as an education officer. She spent a year at the Institute of Education in Singapore from 1980 to 1981. From 1982 to 1993, she was a research officer for the Ministry of Foreign Affairs. From 1993 to 2005, she was deputy director for the Internal Security Department (ISD). In August 2005, she was named deputy permanent secretary for the Prime Minister's Office (PMO), and permanent secretary in December 2006. In August 2007, she officially retired from the PMO.

Borneo Bulletin formally declared on 31 May 2011, that Salbiah will join the Legislative Council (LegCo), effective 1 June. She was appointed as a representative of 'people who have achieved excellence'. She and Zasia Sirin were the first female members of the LegCo. She remained a member until 2016.

== Honours ==
Throughout her career, she has earned the following awards and honours:

- Order of Seri Paduka Mahkota Brunei Second Class (DPMB; 15 July 2007) – Datin Paduka
- Order of Setia Negara Brunei Third Class (SNB)
- Meritorious Service Medal (PJK)
- Long Service Medal (PKL)
