= Seoul Defense Dialogue =

Multilateral security forum

- Inaugurated: 2012
- Organiser: Ministry of National Defense

The Seoul Defense Dialogue is an annual multilateral security forum hosted by the Ministry of National Defense of South Korea since 2012, focused on promoting peace in the Korean Peninsula and regional security cooperations.

== 2026 ==
On 8 September 2026 at the first plenary session of the 2026 Dialogue, Philippines Defense Minister Gilberto Teodoro Jr. was interrupted during an address on the South China Sea, and handed a handwritten note by an audience member. Teodoro noted the note was from China, and that the note rejected the 2016 South China Sea Arbitration that rejected China's 9-dash line claim in the South China Sea. Teodoro subsequently criticized China, saying the note amounted to "throwing UNCLOS to the floor and trampling upon it, but it also disrespects the basic decency that should be accorded to our most gracious host, the Republic of Korea, and the rest of our audience here."

Chinese Foreign Ministry spokeswoman Mao Ning said, "We urge certain people in the Philippines to stop this grandstanding and lying, and to protect China-Philippine relations and the peace and stability in the South China Sea."
