= Sharifah Czarena =

Aviator

- Born: Brunei
- Education: Cabair Flying School
- Known for: First female captain from Brunei
- Aviation career
- Rank: Captain

Sharifah Czarena is a Bruneian pilot, who was the first woman from Brunei to captain a commercial airliner. She was initially seconded to Loganair, where she flew the Saab 340. Since flying for Royal Brunei Airlines, she has flown Boeing 767s and Boeing 787 Dreamliners.

== Career ==
Sharifah Czarena trained as a pilot cadet in 2003, taking her lessons at the Cabair Flying School, Cranfield. After graduating in 2004, she was seconded from Royal Brunei Airlines to Scottish carrier Loganair for two years, flying the Saab 340. On her return to Royal Brunei Airlines, she flew the Boeing 767 as a First Officer.

Czarena was promoted to Senior First Officer in 2007, and to Captain in 2012. She was the first woman from Brunei and Southeast Asia to become the captain of a commercial airliner. At the time, she said "Being a pilot, people normally see it as being a male dominant occupation. As a woman, a Bruneian woman, it is such a great achievement. It’s really showing the younger generation or the girls especially that whatever they dream of, they can achieve it."

In 2016, she made history as the Captain of the first all female flight crew to land in Jeddah, Saudi Arabia, a country at which time did not allow women to get driving licences. The flight was timed to celebrate Brunei's National Day. Alongside her in the Boeing 787 Dreamliner were Senior First Officers Dk Nadiah Pg Khashiem and Sariana Nordin.
