= Sariana Nordin =

Bruneian aviator (born 1976)

- Born: Sariana binti Nordin; 1976; 50 years ago Brunei
- Occupation: Aviator
- Known for: First female pilot to work at Royal Brunei Airlines

Sariana binti Nordin (born 1976) is Brunei an aviator. She is the first female pilot to work at Royal Brunei Airlines.

Sariana began her flight training in Parafield, Adelaide, in 1999; in 2004 she gained both her frozen airline transport pilot's license and her commercial pilot's license. That year she began taking commercial flights in Liverpool and the Isle of Man, continuing in 2006. In September of that year she began conversion training on the Boeing 767 with Royal Brunei Airlines, with whom she later became a senior first officer. In 2008 she was given an award from the Brunei Women's Forum. On February 23, 2016, she served as first officer, alongside captain Sharifah Czarena and first officer Dk Nadiah Pg Khashiem, on a Boeing 787 Dreamliner from Brunei to Jeddah; the flight was the first in the airline's history to be crewed by an all-female flight crew. The three women posted a selfie to Instagram that went viral, and was the subject of numerous articles. Sultan Hassanal Bolkiah joined them on the flight deck on another occasion, piloting the plane on a quick flight over Brunei International Airport.
