= Nor Hashimah Taib =

Bruneian lawyer

Yang Berhormat Datin Seri Paduka Nor Hashimah Taib SPMB DPMB SNB
- نور هشيمه طائب
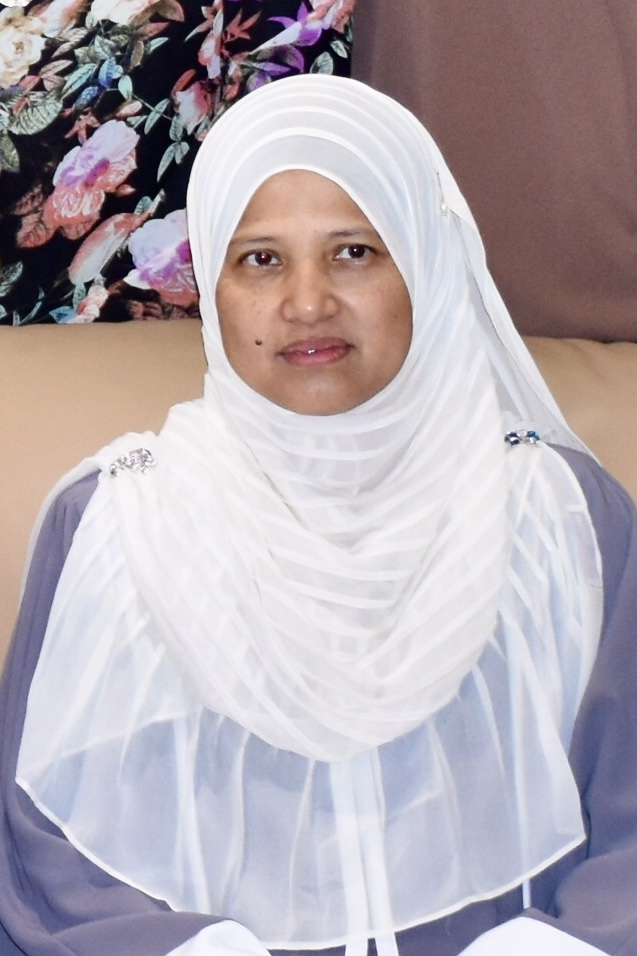
- Nor Hashimah in 2016

9th Attorney General of Brunei
- Incumbent
- Assumed office 29 February 2024
- Monarch: Hassanal Bolkiah
- Preceded by: Ahmad Isa

Personal details
- Born: Brunei
- Children: 8
- Education: Universiti Brunei Darussalam; Lincoln's Inn; University College Wales (LLB)
- Profession: Lawyer

Nor Hashimah binti Haji Mohammed Taib is a Bruneian lawyer who is the incumbent ninth Attorney General of Brunei since 2024, replacing Ahmad Isa.

== Education ==
Nor Hashimah has a number of legal and Islamic finance qualifications, including a Barrister at Law from Lincoln's Inn in 1992, a postgraduate diploma in Guaman Syarie' from Universiti Brunei Darussalam, and a Fiqh Muamalat Professional Programme from the Centre for Islamic Banking Finance and Management. They also hold an LLB (Hons) from University College Wales, located in Aberystwyth, UK.

== Career ==
Nor Hashimah has worked in Brunei's legal and governmental sectors in a variety of capacities. She has worked at the Prime Minister's Office (PMO) as the deputy permanent secretary since 2020. She was the Attorney General's Chambers (AGC) assistant solicitor general in Civil Division from 2018 to 2020 before this. Her also held positions in the divil Division from 1998 to 2006 and the International Affairs Division from 1995 to 1998, in addition to her positions as assistant solicitor general and head of the International Affairs Division from 2006 to 2018. As a legal officer in the AGC, she started her career in 1992.

As part of the endeavour to investigate the legal elements of the ASEAN Charter, Nor Hashimah was designated as a member of the ASEAN High Level Legal Experts Group (HLEG) on Follow Up to the ASEAN Charter. Additionally, she was a member of the country's negotiating team for a number of international trade agreements, including the Regional Comprehensive Economic Partnership Agreement (RCEP), the Trans Pacific Partnership Agreement (CP-TPP), the ASEAN Japan Comprehensive Economic Partnership Agreement (AJCEP), and the Brunei Japan Economic Partnership Agreement (BJEPA).

Nor Hashimah served as the attorney general's representative as a council member of the Law Society of Brunei Darussalam from 2011 to 2020. With effect from 2 May 2020, she was elevated to the position of deputy permanent secretary (Security, Enforcement and Law) in the PMO with the approval of Sultan Hassanal Bolkiah. She was reappointed again as the deputy permanent secretary (Security and Law) in the PMO on 17 August 2022. On 29 February 2024, she officially replaced Ahmad Isa as the attorney general of Brunei.

== Personal life ==
Nor Hashimah is married and has four sons and four daughters. She enjoys reading, running, and trekking.

== Honours ==
Nor Hashimah has earned the following honours;

- Order of Seri Paduka Mahkota Brunei First Class (SPMB) – Datin Seri Paduka (15 July 2024)
- Order of Seri Paduka Mahkota Brunei Second Class (DPMB) – Datin Paduka (15 July 2023)
- Order of Setia Negara Brunei Third Class (SNB; 15 July 2022)

Legal offices
Preceded by Ahmad Isa	9th Attorney General of Brunei; 29 February 2024 – present	Succeeded by Incumbent
