= Hairol Arni =

Brunei attorney general

Dato Paduka Hairol Arni DPMB
- هايرول ارني
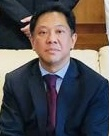
- Hairol in 2020

7th Attorney General of Brunei
- In office 18 August 2018 – 6 October 2020
- Nominated by: Hassanal Bolkiah
- Preceded by: Hayati Salleh
- Succeeded by: Ahmad Isa

Personal details
- Born: Brunei
- Occupation: Magistrate

Hairol Arni bin Haji Abdul Majid, also known as Hairolarni, is a Brunei magistrate who was appointed attorney general from 2018 to 2020.

== Career ==
The Prime Minister's Office announced that Hairol, the Acting Chief Registrar of the High Court and Acting Judge of the Intermediate Court, has been appointed to his roles as Chief Registrar of the High Court and Judge of the Intermediate Court, with approval from Sultan Hassanal Bolkiah. He was appointed to the role effective 1 February 2002, according to a news statement dated 31 January 2002, issued by the Prime Minister's Office.

On 6 March 2014, Hairol convicted seven armed individuals who banded together and plundered homes to long prison terms with several whippings at the High Court.

After twenty witnesses, including representatives from the Royal Customs and Excise Department and the Narcotics Control Bureau (NCB), testified during the trial, deputy public prosecutors proved their case beyond a reasonable doubt. On 21 August 2014, Steven Chong and Hairol rendered their decision and sentenced the Kenyan woman to death for trafficking 3 kilograms (6.6 lb) of methylamphetamine worth over B$2 million on the illicit market.

Hairol said that, as of 10 November 2015, the Brunei Legislative Council was still working to finalize the Environmental Protection and Management Order 2015. The judiciary of Brunei has had a role in promoting the passage of this legislation. Additionally, he said that Brunei would want to accept Singapore's statement on the Angkor Statement, the Hanoi Action Plan, and the Jakarta Common Vision are aspirational documents that do not call for legally enforceable obligations from Singapore, and that it should be documented that they shared the same opinions about the Hanoi Action Plan.

Before being named attorney general on 9 August 2018, Hairol served as a judge on the High Court and responded negatively when asked if the scandal (Ramzidah and Nabil Daraina) had undermined public trust in the judiciary. He continued by saying that, in part because of the corruption issue, the Attorney General's Chamber (AGC) changed the Penal Code in October to increase the penalty for criminal breach of trust.

From 12 to 16 August 2018, Hairol attended the "11th China-ASEAN Prosecutors General Conference." He would officially take office on 18th later that month. As the conference chair, he opened discussion by stating that the topic of the conference, "Enhancing Capabilities and Cooperation in Addressing Cybercrime," was chosen in light of the growing harm that cybercrime is causing to society.

The Commemorative Meeting of the Governing Council of the ASEAN Law Association (ALA), presided over by Hairol, was held in Manila as part of the ASEAN 50th anniversary. Earlier on 27 July, he signed the Singapore Declaration at the 6th Council of ASEAN Chief Justice Meeting. On 27 July 2020, Hairol's tenure was unexpectedly stopped by His Majesty's administration; no cause was given.

== Honours ==
Hairol has earned the following honours;

- Order of Seri Paduka Mahkota Brunei Second Class (DPMB; 2008) – Dato Paduka

Legal offices
Preceded by Hayati Salleh	7th Attorney General of Brunei; 18 August 2018 – 6 October 2020	Succeeded by Ahmad Isa
