= Steven Chong Wan Oon =

Bruneian chief justice (born 1957)

Yang Amat Arif Dato Seri Paduka Steven Chong Wan Oon SPMB PSB PJK
- 张万安
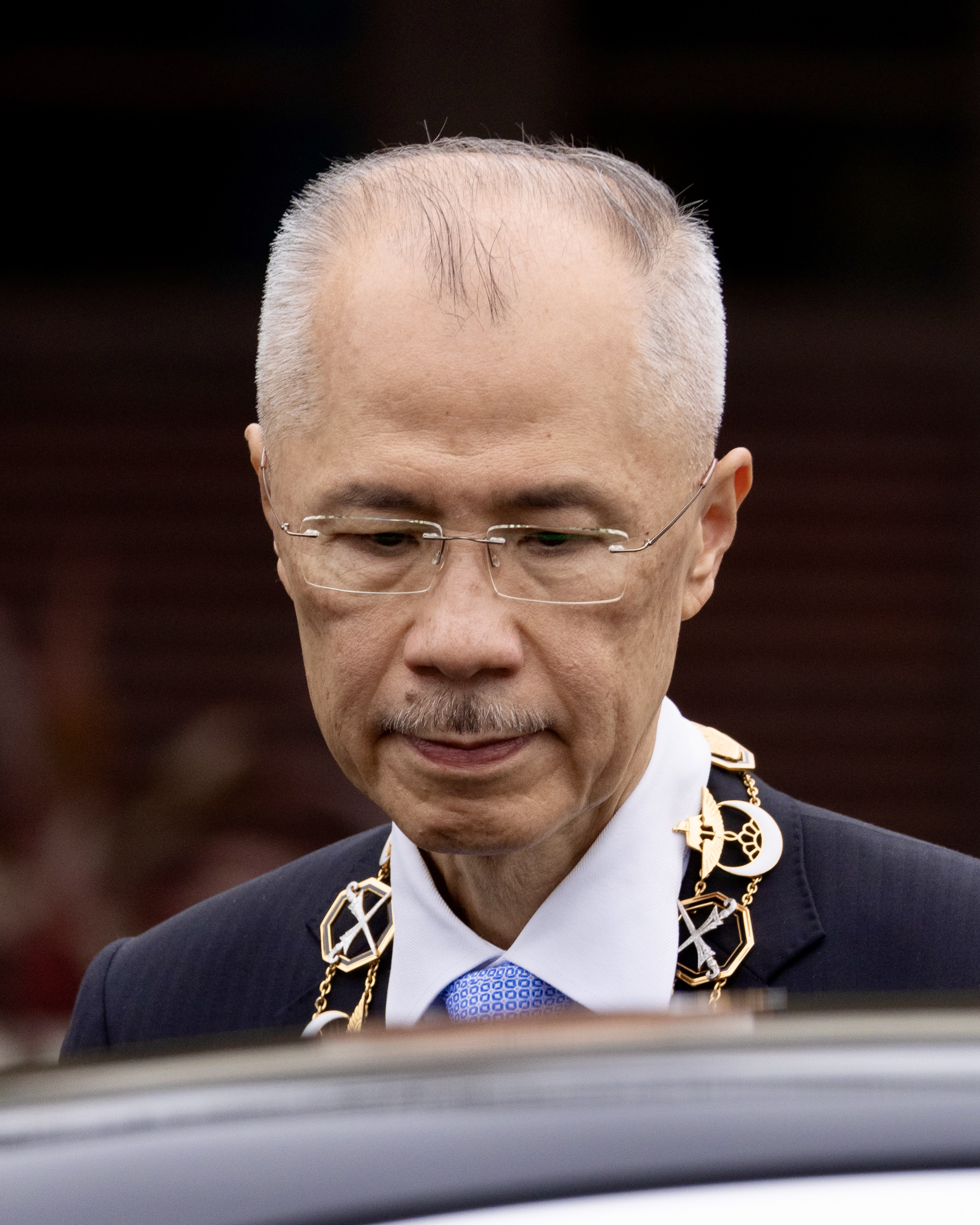
- Dato Chong in 2024

5th Chief Justice of Brunei
- Incumbent
- Assumed office 30 June 2018
- Nominated by: Hassanal Bolkiah
- Preceded by: Kifrawi Kifli

Personal details
- Born: Steven Chong Wan Oon; 1957 (age 68–69)
- Spouse: Magdalene Chong
- Education: St. George's School
- Alma mater: Dorset Institute of Higher Education (BA); Inns of Court School of Law
- Occupation: Judge

Chinese name
- Simplified Chinese: 张万安
- Traditional Chinese: 張萬安
Transcriptions
Standard Mandarin
- Hanyu Pinyin: Zhāng Wàn'ān
Hakka
- Pha̍k-fa-sṳ: Chông Van-ôn

Steven Chong Wan Oon (Chinese: 张万安; pinyin: Zhāng Wàn'ān; born 1957) is a Brunei magistrate who was appointed chief justice of the Supreme Court of Brunei Darussalam in 2018.

== Early life and education ==
Steven Chong Wan Oon was born in 1957, the son of Celestine Kong Nyet Khyun. He is married to Datin Paduka Magdalene Chong, a fellow lawyer in the same legal profession. He began his education at St. George's School in Brunei before pursuing further studies in the United Kingdom at Mid-Gloucestershire Technical College. In 1981, he earned a Bachelor of Arts (Hons) degree in humanities from the Dorset Institute of Higher Education. A year later, he qualified as a barrister-of-law at Lincoln's Inn, having completed his legal training at the Inns of Court School of Law in London.

== Career ==
By 1983, Chong was professionally qualified as an advocate and solicitor of the Supreme Court of Brunei Darussalam. Following the completion of his education in London, he began his career in the civil service. In 1987, Chong was appointed as magistrate and registrar of the Magistrate Court of Brunei, marking the start of a series of promotions. He became senior magistrate and registrar of the Supreme Court in 1989, and in 1991, he advanced to chief magistrate and registrar. In 1998, Chong was appointed as a judge of the Intermediate Court, followed by his role as judicial commissioner of the Supreme Court in 1999. In 2001, he was promoted to High Court judge, and later served as a Court of Appeal judge on an ad hoc basis. In 2006, Chong was also appointed judge advocate of the Royal Brunei Armed Forces, reflecting his distinguished legal career.

Known for his impartiality, Chong is well-versed in both criminal and civil law, as well as legal procedure, evidence, and logic. Several cases highlight his judicial expertise: in Hjh Rosmahwati bte Hj Bakar v Doni Bin Akup, a civil appeal in the Court of Appeal of Brunei, he demonstrated his proficiency in civil law. In Haji Ahmad bin Haji Malai Besar and Mohammad Qahruddin bin Ahmad v The London & Lancashire Insurance Co. Ltd., Chong served as the High Court judge, ruling on an appeal from the Registrar. His role in the high-profile criminal trial, PP v Edgar Puzone E., alias Ibrahim bin Abdullah Puzone, further showcased his ability to navigate complex legal challenges. In this case, involving a brutal murder, Chong and the Chief Justice rejected the defendant's insanity defence, concluding that the crime was premeditated and driven by motive. Their decision underscored Chong’s sound judgment in handling serious criminal matters.

Sultan Hassanal Bolkiah appointed Steven Chong as Chief Justice of the Supreme Court of Brunei on 30 June 2018, succeeding Kifrawi Kifli, who had held the position for nine years. On 15 July 2019, the Sultan honoured Chong by investing him into the Order of Seri Paduka Mahkota Brunei First Class, a prestigious title that confers the rank of "Dato Seri Paduka." That same month, Chong received the International Jurists Award 2019, presented by Adish Aggarwala, President of the International Council of Jurists. During the ceremony, British High Commissioner Richard Lindsay praised the council’s efforts in promoting justice and equality globally. In January 2020, Chong introduced new media guidelines to promote transparency, ensure fair reporting on court matters, and enhance public understanding of the judiciary. He also introduced a judicial conduct and ethics handbook to guide the behavior of judges and judicial officers.

On 5 May 2023, Chong and Paul Lam, Secretary for Justice of Hong Kong, signed a Memorandum of Understanding (MoU) to enhance collaboration in dispute avoidance and resolution. The agreement aims to foster communication and cooperation between the Hong Kong Special Administrative Region and Brunei in these areas, supporting the growth of related services in both regions. Later, on 5 August 2023, Chong, along with Sundaresh Menon of Singapore, signed a cooperation agreement between the Supreme Courts of Singapore and Brunei to further improve communication and collaboration on conflict prevention and resolution.

== Awards and honours ==
=== Awards ===
- International Jurists Award 2019

=== Honours ===
Chong has earned the following honours;

- Order of Seri Paduka Mahkota Brunei First Class (SPMB; 15 July 2019) – Dato Seri Paduka
- Order of Seri Paduka Mahkota Brunei Second Class (DPMB; 15 July 2002) – Dato Paduka
- Order of Setia Negara Brunei Fourth Class (PSB; 1995)
- Meritorious Service Medal (PJK; 1989)

Legal offices
| Preceded by Kifrawi Kifli | Chief Justice of Brunei; 2018–present | Incumbent |
