= Supreme Court of Brunei Darussalam =

National supreme court

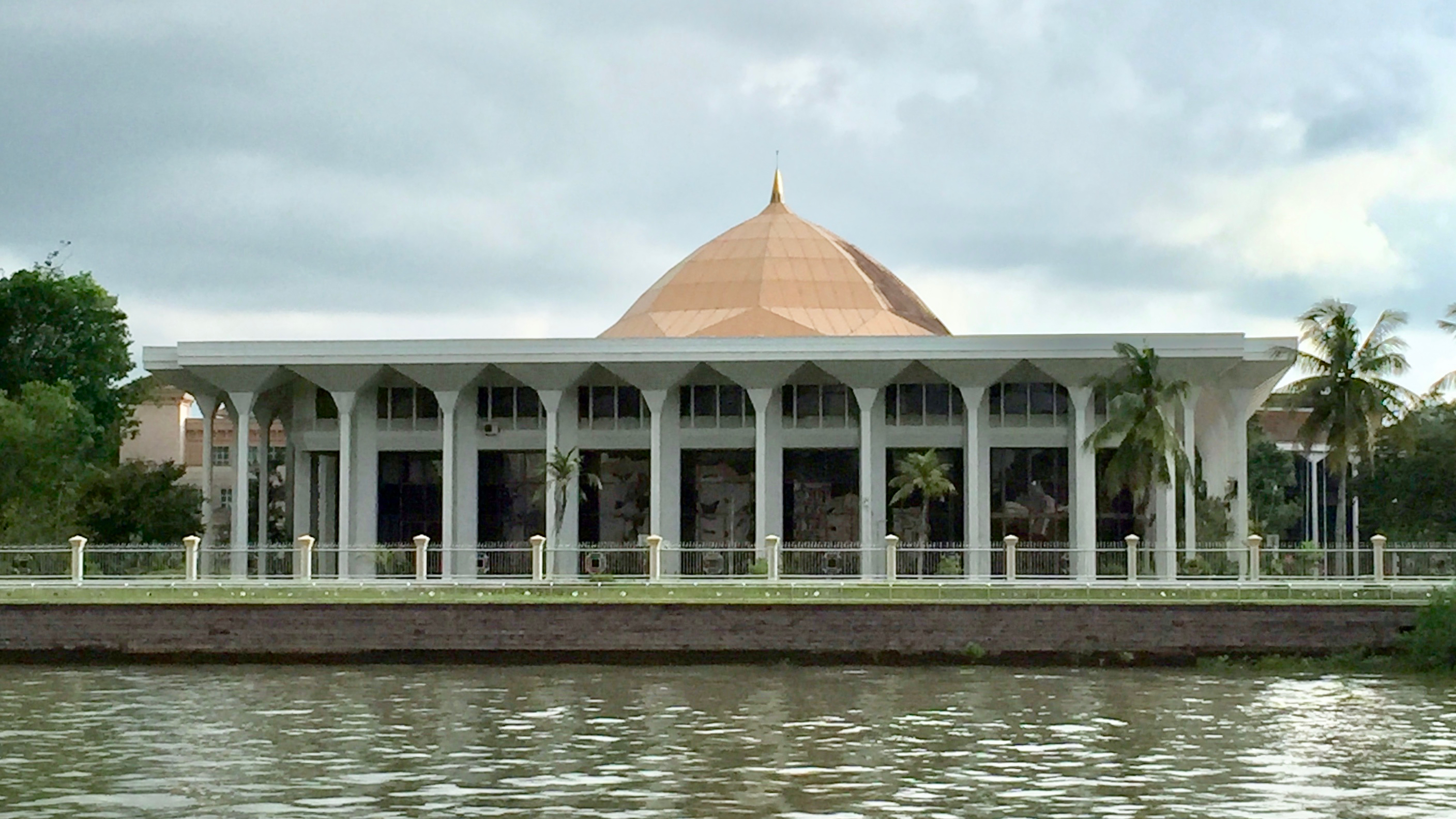
- Supreme Court Building
- Interactive map of Supreme Court of Brunei Darussalam
- 4.8907136°N 114.9349087°E
- Established: 1963; 63 years ago
- Coordinates: 4.8907136°N 114.9349087°E
- Authorised by: Constitution of Brunei
- Website: judiciary.gov.bn

Chief Justice of Brunei
- Currently: Steven Chong Wan Oon
- Since: 30 June 2018

The Supreme Court of Brunei Darussalam is, in theory, the highest court of Brunei Darussalam, though its decisions are subject to appeal in civil cases to the Judicial Committee of the Privy Council. The Chief Justice and other Judges of the Supreme Court are appointed by the Sultan of Brunei to sit in judgment of the most acrimonious contentions in the country.

== Supreme Court Building ==
The Supreme Court of Sarawak, North Borneo, and Brunei was replaced by the Supreme Court of Brunei Darussalam in 1963. The High Court and Court of Appeal that make up the new Supreme Court have the same authority as the previous Supreme Court. The Supreme Court Building has had several locations since it was founded, including Kuala Belait. Both the former Secretariat Building and the old Lapau Building were partially occupied by it.

The new Supreme Court Building was the subject of an architectural competition that the government held in 1978. Sungai Kedayan to the east and Jalan Tutong to the north border the building's chosen location. The building's construction started in February 1981 and was finished in 1983. The structure cost B$20 million to construct and has a 96,500 square foot floor space. The Supreme Court Building's ribbon-cutting event took place on 15 March 1984.

== Judges ==
Judges of the Supreme Court of Hong Kong were granted permission by the government of Hong Kong to serve as Judges of the Supreme Court of Brunei Darussalam. It was standard procedure to appoint Supreme Court of Hong Kong judges as Judicial Commissioners of the Supreme Court of Brunei Darussalam for a three-year term. In 1993, this long-standing legal agreement with Hong Kong came to an end. When it comes to filling vacancies on the Brunei Supreme Court, Brunei have still continued to use the services of former Hong Kong justices.

The Chief Justice of Hong Kong would frequently be named as the Chief Justice of Brunei Darussalam. Although Sir Denys Tudor Emil Roberts, the previous Chief Justice of Hong Kong, retired from his position as Chief Justice of Hong Kong with effect from 15 March 1988, he continued to serve as Chief Justice of Brunei Darussalam. On 24 May 1988, Yang Ti-liang, the Chief Justice of Hong Kong, was chosen to lead the Court of Appeals. Until May 16th, 1993, he served as the Court of Appeals' President. Kutlu Tekin Fuad, a retired judge from the Hong Kong Court of Appeal, was chosen to lead the Court of Appeal on 17 May.

== Chief justices ==
Portrait	Minister	Term start	Term end	Time in office	Ref.
	Geoffrey Gould Briggs	1963	18 June 1979	16 years, 168 days	
	Denys Tudor Emil Roberts	18 June 1979	1 August 2001	22 years, 44 days	
	Mohammad Saied	1 August 2001	4 August 2009	8 years, 3 days	
	Kifrawi Kifli	4 August 2009	30 June 2018	8 years, 330 days	
	Steven Chong Wan Oon	30 June 2018	Incumbent	8 years, 24 days	
