= Abdul Hapidz =

Bruneian politician and businessperson (1928–2022)

Yang Dimuliakan Pehin Orang Kaya Ratna Setia Dato Setia Abdul Hapidz DSNB DPMB PJK
- عبدالهاڤيذ

President of the Brunei People's Independence Party
- In office August 1966 – April 1969
- Preceded by: Office established
- Succeeded by: Zainal Abidin Puteh

Personal details
- Born: August 1930 Brunei
- Died: 2022 (aged 91–92)
- Other political affiliations: BARIP (1940s); PRB (1956–1962); BAKER (1966–1967)
- Occupation: Politician; businessman
- Known for: Managing director of Abdul Razak Holdings; Founder of Laksamana College of Business

Abdul Hapidz bin Haji Abdul Razak (Note: He was also widely known as "Hapidz Laksamana.") (August 1930 – 2022) was a Bruneian aristocrat, politician and businessman. He served as vice president of the Partai Rakyat Brunei (PRB) during the 1962 Brunei revolt and later led the Brunei People's Independence Party (BAKER) as its president from 1966 to 1969. In 1962, he was reportedly the richest man in Brunei after Sultan Omar Ali Saifuddien III.

After leaving politics, he shifted his focus to business, becoming involved in the corporate sector. He served as the managing director of Abdul Razak Holdings (ARH), one of Brunei's largest real estate developers. Additionally, he was the president of the Brunei Malay Chamber of Commerce and Industry (DPPMB) from 1964 to 1999 and the director of Laksamana College of Business (LCB) from 2003 until 2022.

== Early life and education ==
Abdul Hapidz was born into a privileged family in August 1930 as the son of Pehin Orang Kaya Laksamana Haji Abdul Razak. His older brother, Pehin Orang Kaya Di-Gadong Seri Di Raja Haji Mohd Noor, was a member of the consultative committee working on the 1959 Brunei constitution. Concerned about Abdul Hapidz's political involvement, his brother unsuccessfully tried to dissuade him from joining the PRB, leading to misunderstandings within the family. Abdul Hapidz received his early education at Pekan Brunei Malay School in Brunei Town, now known as Bandar Seri Begawan.

== Political career ==
Abdul Hapidz was an active member of the Barisan Pemuda (BARIP) movement in the 1940s before founding the Persatuan Murid-Murid Tua in 1947, an organisation with sociocultural objectives. When the PRB was officially registered as a political party on 15 August 1956, he was appointed treasurer, a role he held until 1958. That year, he was elected as the party's deputy president. In this capacity, he also took over as editor and publisher of Suara Bakti following Zaini Ahmad's withdrawal.

He also played a key role in the labour movement, serving as the secretary-general of the Brunei United Labour Front, which was established on 29 May 1960 to protect workers' rights in Brunei. On 3 June 1961, he expressed support for a federation of the Borneo territories, emphasising that his party, with its 19,000 members, opposed becoming another state within Malaya and instead favoured a partnership of equals.

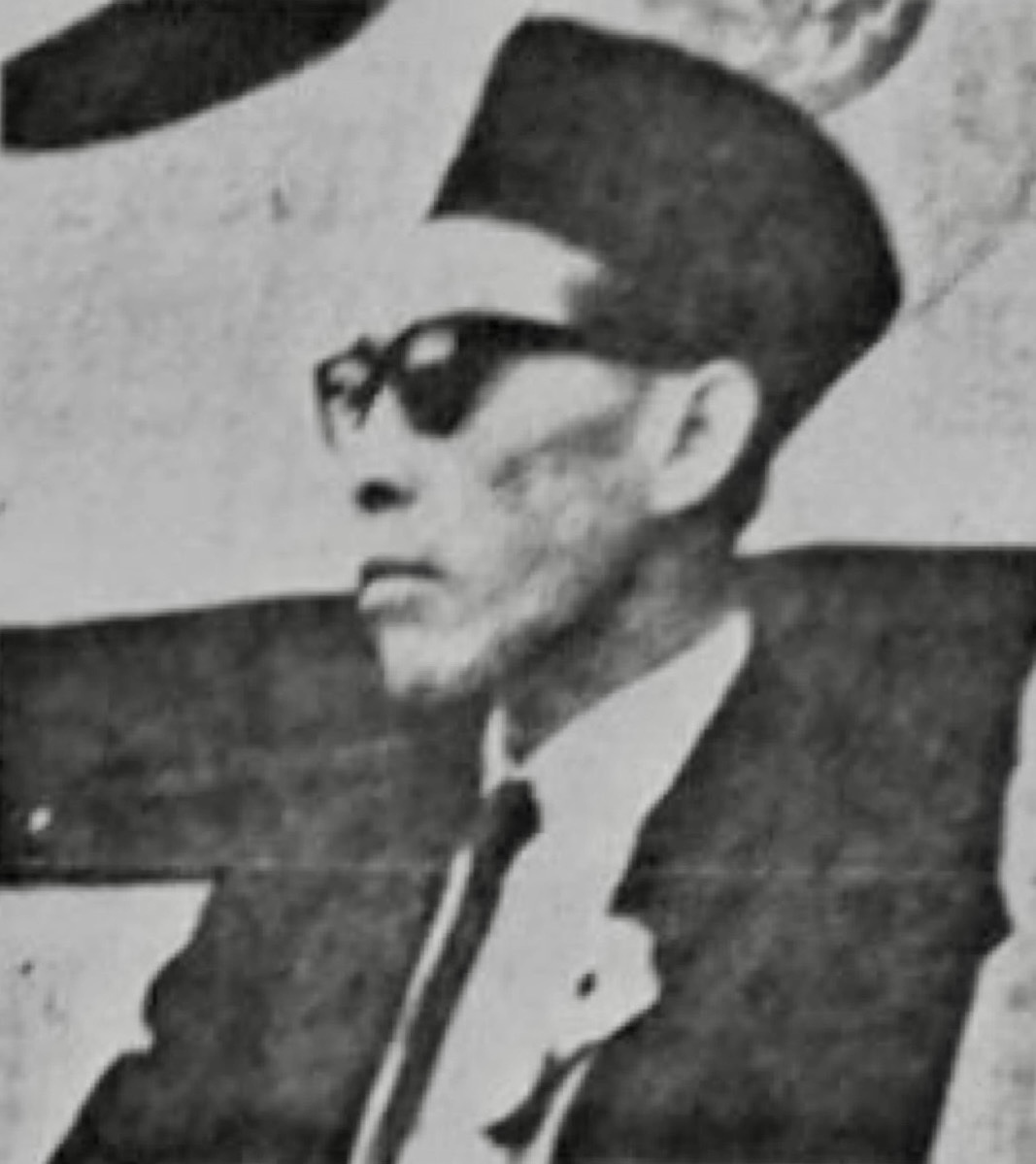
Abdul Hapidz, c. 1962

After A. M. Azahari's resignation and self-imposed exile in Johore, Malaya, in late April 1962, he relied on Abdul Hapidz to lead the PRB's election campaign, which culminated in the August 1962 elections. During this time, he also played a key political role in advocating for Brunei's position in regional affairs. In June, as vice president of the PRB, he urged the British government to counter the Philippines' claim to North Borneo by establishing Sultan Omar Ali Saifuddien III as the ruler of North Borneo, Sarawak, and Brunei. In the elections, he won the Sungai Kedayan seat with 333 votes, defeating independent candidate Talib Salleh. Although the PRB secured all six unofficial (elected) seats on the Executive Council, he was the only party member appointed to the council in September. That same year, he was also named the minister of labour for the PRB.

Abdul Hapidz supported Azahari's call for a revision of Brunei's "undemocratic" constitution after the elections, advocating for the sultan to guide the nation towards democracy while preserving traditional privileges. Following the PRB's success in the District Councils, he was appointed head of the unofficial opposition in the Legislative Council (LegCo), with Yassin Affandi as his deputy. Though initially reluctant to join the Executive Council, he eventually accepted the nomination out of respect for the sultan. By October 1962, Abdul Hapidz led six PRB members on the Executive Council, while the LegCo consisted of PRB-elected members alongside officials and nominated representatives. When arrests in Lawas caused panic among PRB members, Abdul Hapidz, Yassin, and Pengiran Metussin urgently flew to Manila to meet Azahari, who was discussing the Filipino claim to North Borneo and his plan for the United Nations (UN). Upon learning of the PRB's exposure, Azahari ordered a delay in any action until after his return from the UN, preventing an immediate rebellion.

When Abdul Hapidz, Yassin, and Pengiran Metussin returned to Brunei in late November or early December, they found the political climate tense, with many PRB members in hiding. The situation worsened when the speaker of the LegCo, Pengiran Muhammad Ali, rejected the PRB's anti-Malaysia motions, citing a lack of jurisdiction over the British and Malayan governments. The postponement of the Council meeting from 5 to 19 December further deepened the uncertainty. Despite the turmoil, he and his faction of the PRB distanced themselves from the PRB uprising, which was led by more extreme party members. Though the PRB was structured similarly to the PRB, Abdul Hapidz commanded the moderate section, maintaining a separation from the militant group. Three weeks after the elections, the PRB announced that he would lead its faction in the LegCo.

On the morning of 8 December 1962, Abdul Hapidz and Pengiran Metussin arrived at the Istana Darul Hana to present the sultan with a letter from the Kiram Corporation and the proclamation of independence for his approval. However, the sultan refused to meet them and directed them to Chief Minister Marsal Maun. As they attempted to leave, police intercepted them at the entrance, and Alan Neil Outram ordered their arrest. Following this, arrest warrants were also issued for Azahari and Zaini for instigating the uprising.

Abdul Hapidz was unaware of the planned uprising and was caught off guard when PRB members came for him. During his detention, he disavowed any ties to the rebels and pledged loyalty to the sultan, leading to his relatively swift release. Despite this, he remained imprisoned until May 1963. In March that year, the sultan considered using Abdul Hapidz and other PRB leaders to publicly denounce Azahari’s ties to Indonesia and support Brunei's entry into Malaysia. At the sultan's request, White assessed their reliability, finding Abdul Hapidz particularly cooperative and suitable for a new pro-Malaysia political party. He recommended paroling Abdul Hapidz, along with Tengah Hasip and Pengiran Metussin, to engage with the kampongs and potentially join Pengiran Yusuf in leading the new party.

The release of Abdul Hapidz and the other two men was delayed due to security concerns, as the mentri besar requested more detailed reports on their actions before approving parole. While both Marsal and the sultan preferred to keep them detained, the sultan was open to the idea of Abdul Hapidz and the others touring the kampongs to support his administration and the Malaysia concept. However, Pengiran Metussin was not released due to his role in organising the rebellion. On 19 May 1963, he was transferred to Kampong Bunut for rehabilitation, where he was expected to teach, deliver pro-government and pro-Malaysia speeches, and assist with psychological operations, although plans for a new political party were ultimately abandoned. In the following year, he was one of the founding members of the DPPMB.

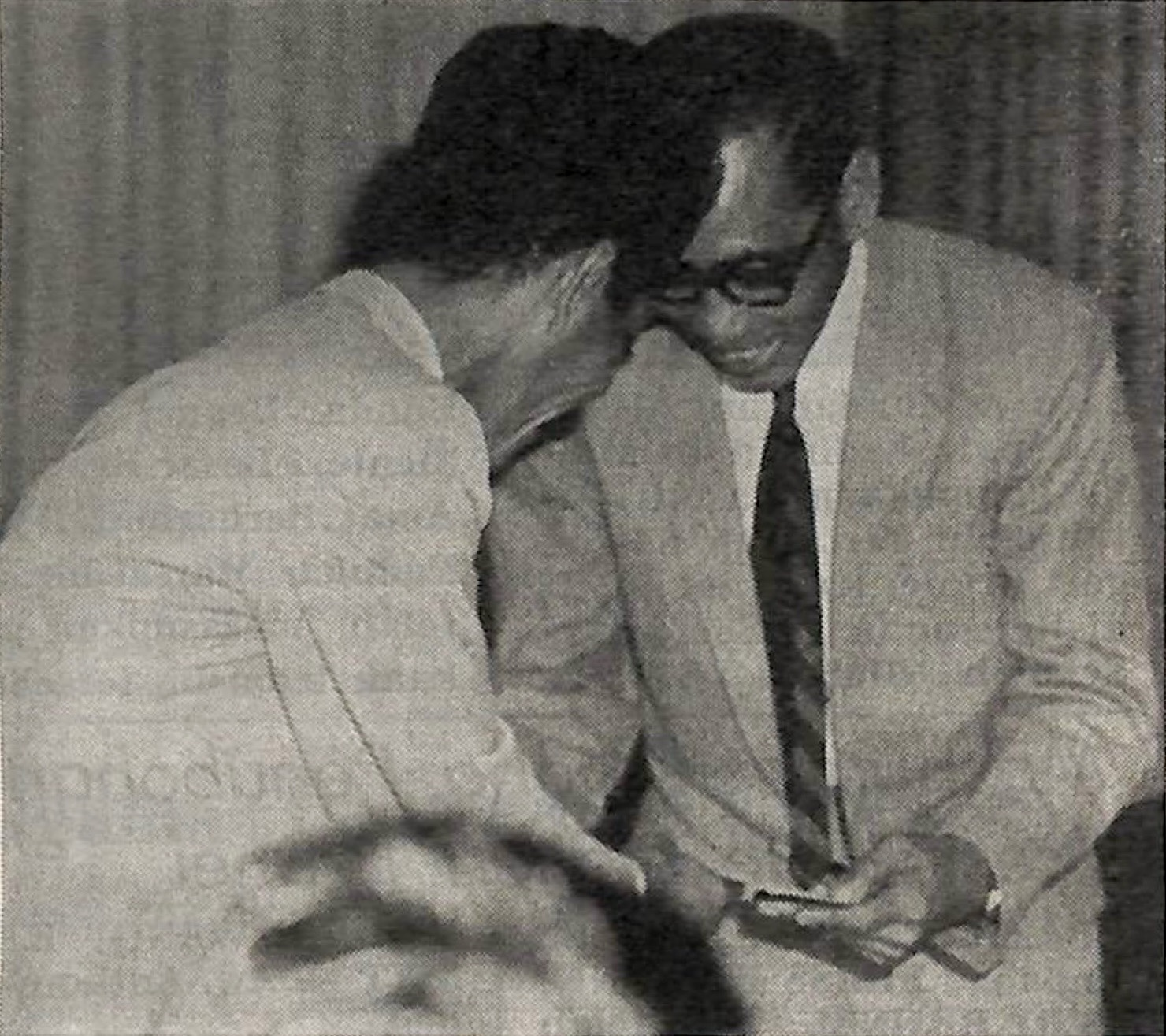
Pengiran Muhammad Yusuf (left) receiving the constitutional review memorandum from Abdul Hapidz (right) in November 1966

Abdul Hapidz won a legislative seat as an independent candidate in the 1965 elections. In 1966, he was elected president of the newly formed BAKER, playing a key role in uniting Brunei's political figures under a common goal of independence. He led the party's leadership in seeking an audience with the sultan in October 1966, following BAKER's swift registration as a political party. Although the meeting was largely ceremonial, BAKER later submitted a memorandum advocating for Brunei's rapid independence and the implementation of constitutional proposals. Abdul Hapidz also held the British government accountable for ensuring the execution of the White Paper 4/65 proposals, though the Brunei government ignored the party's memorandum and refused to engage in discussions on constitutional progress.

In September 1969, Abdul Hapidz resigned as president of BAKER, along with other key party leaders, citing personal and business reasons. His departure followed the party’s declining electoral success and its exclusion from the Brunei delegation for talks in London earlier that year.

== Business career ==
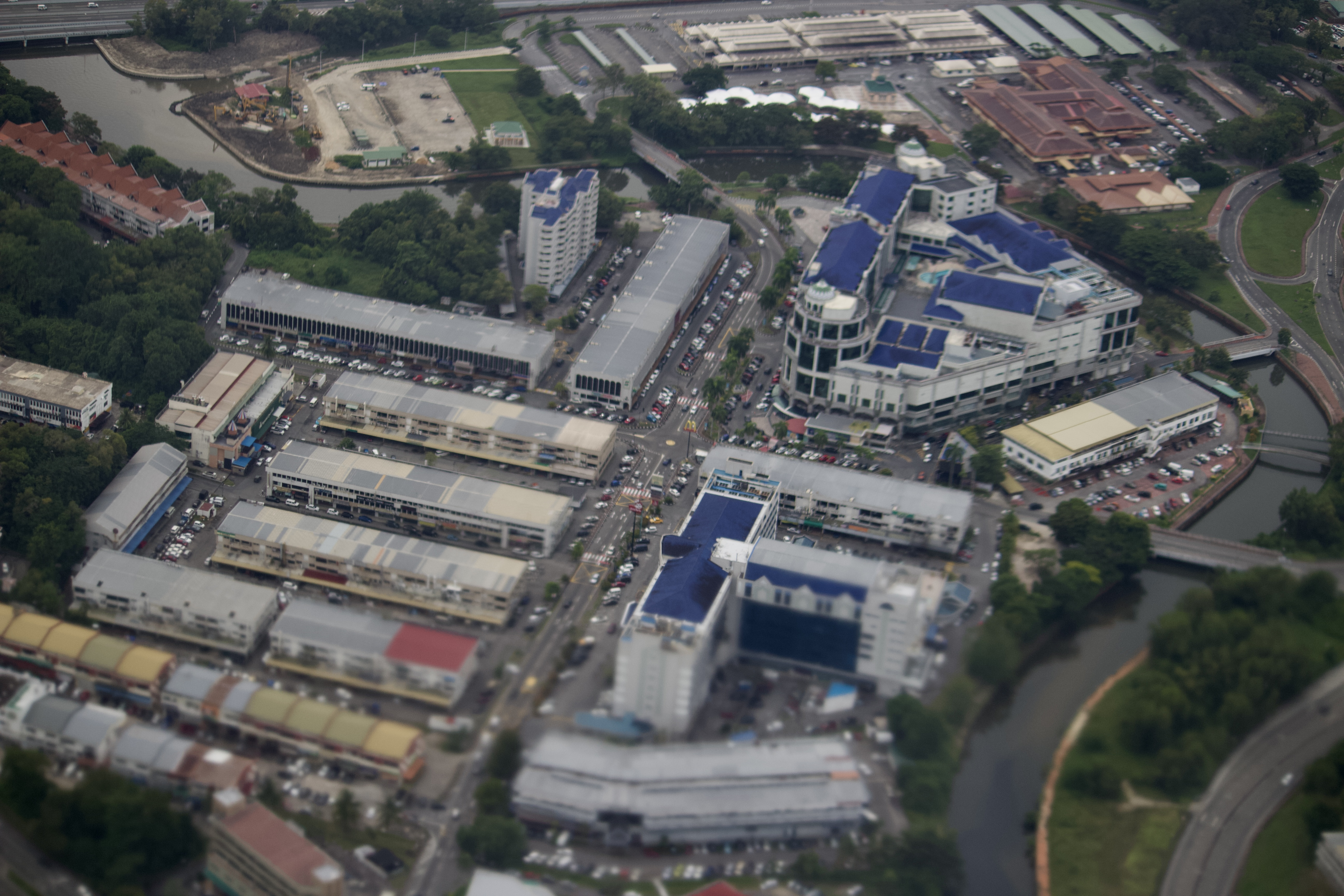
An aerial view of the Abdul Razak Complex as seen in 2022

Following his political career, he venture into business by taking over his family business, ARH, established by his father on 5 October 1978. Hotel management and real estate development are two of ARH's primary business endeavors. The business is one of Brunei's largest real estate developers, having constructed 2.2 million square feet of commercial and residential real estate. He has built buildings like the Centrepoint Hotel in 1994, and The Mall in 2006. In addition, ARH has made a foreign investment when it bought the apartment complex Porchester Court in the Bayswater neighbourhood of Central London. It is now developing another apartment complex in Kuala Lumpur, Malaysia. With a 30% share in Yaohan Brunei through ARH, Abdul Hapidz was a major collaborator in the department store's entry into the nation.

Abdul Hapidz made his way into the field of education in 2003 when he established Brunei's private Laksamana College of Business. His goal was to inspire the next generation of Bruneians to engage with and enjoy business, with a particular focus on developing entrepreneurs and addressing the country's diversification needs. In addition to his contributions to education, he played a role in national events, serving as chairman of the organising committee for the fireworks display and decoration. On 23 June 2005, he revealed that a "royal concert" featuring well-known performers from Brunei and Malaysia took place at Jerudong Park Amphitheater as part of the 59th birthday festivities of Sultan Hassanal Bolkiah. He also served as chairman of the finance committee for the Cendera Kenangan Kekal project, announced that over one million dollars had been collected in donations for the construction of a monument commemorating the sultan's 60th birthday.

Beyond education and event organising, Abdul Hapidz significantly contributed to Brunei's urban development. Around 2007, under his leadership, Abdul Razak Holdings (ARH) played a key role in the transformation of Gadong, owning a large tract of land in the area. The Abdul Razak Complex (Note: This should not be confused with the Abdul Razak Plaza in Batu Satu.) became a catalyst for Gadong's expansion, introducing shophouses, residential properties, a hotel, and a shopping complex with various facilities. The strategic location of Gadong, adjacent to the highway leading to Brunei International Airport and close to the city centre, further cemented its status as a prime area for development. (Note: Despite the development's encouraging growth, ARH has chosen to keep ownership of the properties and lease them instead of selling in order to recoup the mall's investment. The business has no immediate plans to grow even though there is still a need for space.)

Abdul Hapidz served as an advisor on the sponsorship and advertisement working committee for the 2018 Hassanal Bolkiah Trophy.

== Personal life ==
Hapidz was married to Datin Munira binti Dato Haji Yunus. (Note: On 17 April 2012, his wife died at the age of 49, in Singapore. She was brought back to Brunei soon after and prayers were conducted at her residence in Kampong Kiarong prior to her burial.) His residence is located at Jalan Elia Fatimah, Kampong Kiarong.

Despite no official announcement of his death, LCB hosted a tahlil for Abdul Hapidz in August 2022.

== Titles, styles and honours ==
=== Titles and styles ===
On 17 April 2004, Abdul Hapidz was honoured by Sultan Hassanal Bolkiah with the manteri title of Pehin Orang Kaya Ratna Setia, bearing the style Yang Dimuliakan.

=== Honours ===
Abdul Hapidz has been bestowed the following honours:

- Order of Setia Negara Brunei Second Class (DSNB; 15 July 2006) – Dato Setia
- Order of Seri Paduka Mahkota Brunei Second Class (DPMB; 1984) – Dato Paduka
- Meritorious Service Medal (PJK)

=== Things named after him ===
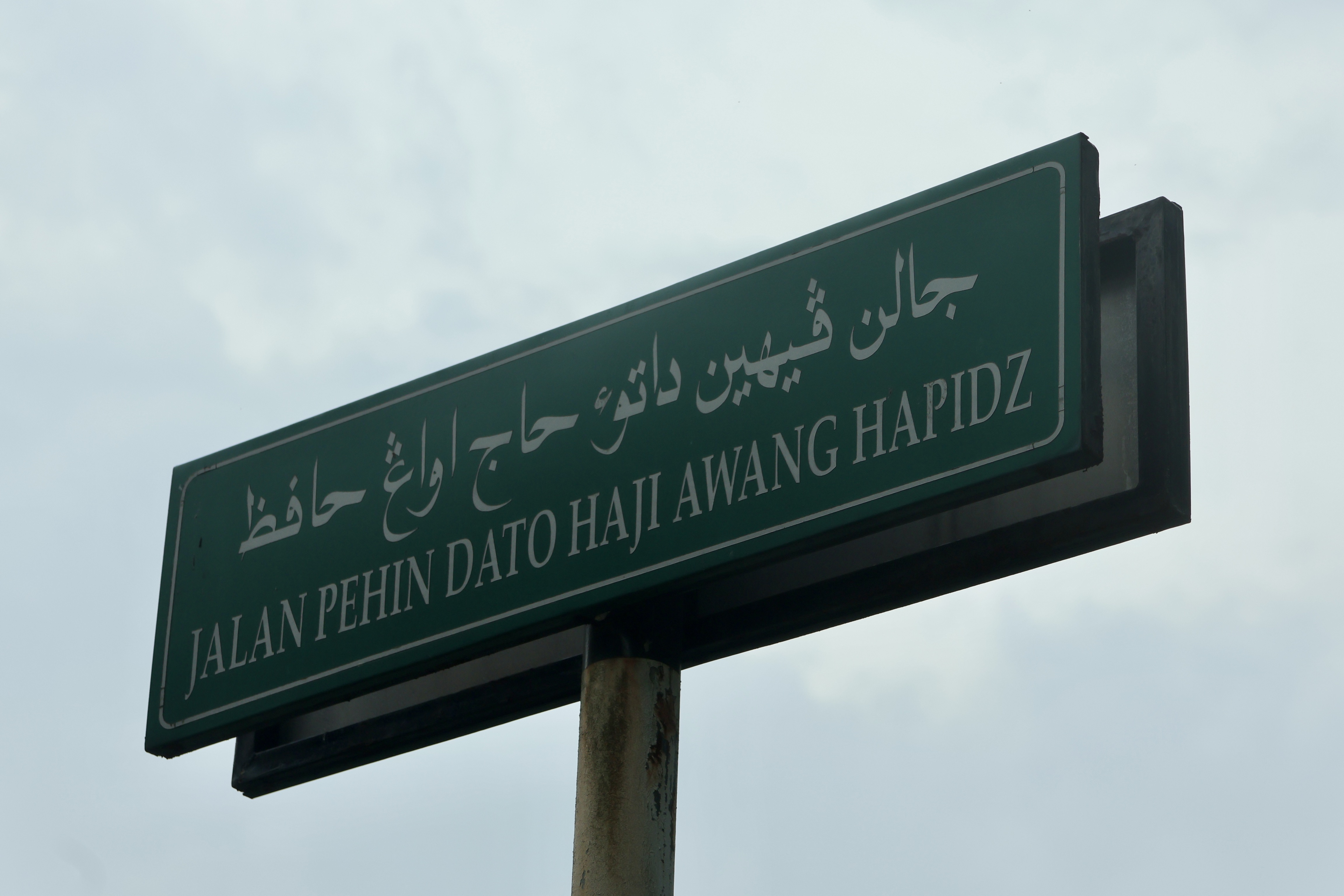
Jalan Pehin Dato Haji Awang Hapidz

- Jalan Pehin Dato Haji Awang Hapidz, a road in Gadong.
- Jambatan Pehin Dato Haji Awang Hapidz, a bridge in Gadong.
