= Pengiran Muhammad Ali =

Bruneian educator and politician (1916–2005)

Yang Amat Mulia Pengiran Pekerma Setia Diraja Sahibul Bandar Pengiran Muhammad Ali PSLJ SPMB DSNB POAS PHBS PJK PKL
- ڤڠيرن محمد علي
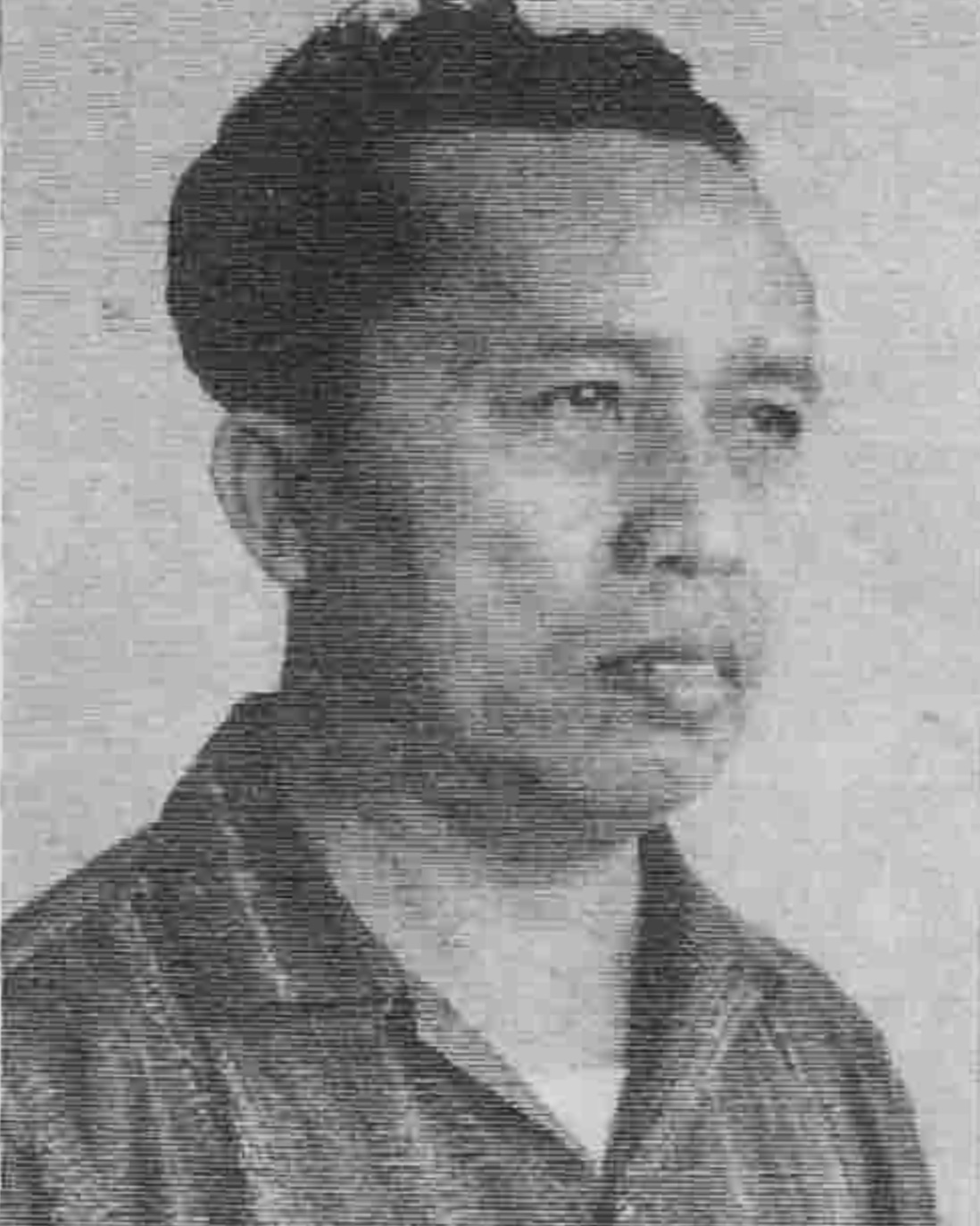
- Pengiran Muhammad Ali, c. 1965

1st Deputy Menteri Besar of Brunei
- In office 23 September 1962 – 1965
- Monarch: Omar Ali Saifuddien III
- Minister: Marsal Maun
- Preceded by: Office established
- Succeeded by: Isa Ibrahim

2nd Speaker of the Legislative Council of Brunei
- In office March 1962 – September 1962
- Menteri Besar: Marsal Maun
- Preceded by: Pengiran Abu Bakar
- Succeeded by: Ibrahim Mohammad Jahfar

1st State Religious Affairs Officer
- In office 1 May 1960 – August 1962
- Preceded by: Office established
- Succeeded by: Pengiran Anak Kemaluddin

Personal details
- Born: 4 October 1916 Kampong Pengiran Pemancha Lama, Kampong Ayer, Brunei
- Died: 16 June 2005 (aged 88) Kampong Madewa, Bandar Seri Begawan, Brunei
- Resting place: Royal Mausoleum (Brunei), Bandar Seri Begawan, Brunei
- Party: PAKAR (1965–1966); BAKER (1966–1969)
- Spouse: Hajah Nahriah (m. 1971)
- Education: Sultan Idris Teachers' College
- Occupation: Civil servant; educator; politician

Pengiran Muhammad Ali bin Pengiran Haji Muhammad Daud (Note: The former spelling of his given name is "Pengiran Mohamed Yusof" rather than "Pengiran Muhammad Yusuf.") (4 October 1916 – 16 June 2005) was a Bruneian civil servant, educator and noble politician. He served as Brunei's first state religious affairs officer from 1960 to 1962 and was appointed speaker of the Legislative Council of Brunei (LegCo) in 1962 before becoming the country's first deputy menteri besar (chief minister) from 1962 to 1965.

He was one of the "Three M's" or "Three Musketeers," (Note: Not to be confused with another set of "Three Musketeers," Sulaiman Damit, Mohammad Daud, and Awangku Ibnu Basit earned the nickname after being selected for officer cadet training at the Federation Military College in Malaya in 1960.) feared by the British government, alongside Marsal Maun and Pengiran Muhammad Yusuf. As one of the founding members of the Brunei Malay Teachers Association (PGGMB). he was also a trusted confidante of Sultan Omar Ali Saifuddien III and played a crucial role in advancing Brunei's nationalist aspirations. He was instrumental in revising the 1959 constitution and negotiating the Anglo–Brunei Agreement.

Beyond his influence in politics, he was a distinguished educationist, contributing significantly to the introduction and expansion of Islamic religious education in Brunei. He also played a key role in shaping the country's national education strategy. In the early 1950s, he facilitated the admission of Brunei's first two students to Madrasah Aljunied Al-Islamiah in Singapore and spearheaded a program to send more Bruneian students there.

Additionally, he was the father-in-law of Princess Amal Nasibah, daughter of Sultan Omar Ali Saifuddien III.

== Early life and education ==
Pengiran Muhammad Ali was born on 6 July 1916 in Kampong Pengiran Pemancha Lama, a village within Kampong Ayer. He received his early education at Jalan Pemancha Malay School in 1925 before continuing at Brunei Town Malay School until 1930, completing Standard V. On 8 February 1933, he began work as a student teacher for a short period. He later pursued further studies at Sultan Idris Training College (SITC) in Tanjung Malim, Perak, from 1934 to 1936.

== Career ==
=== Early career as state councillor ===
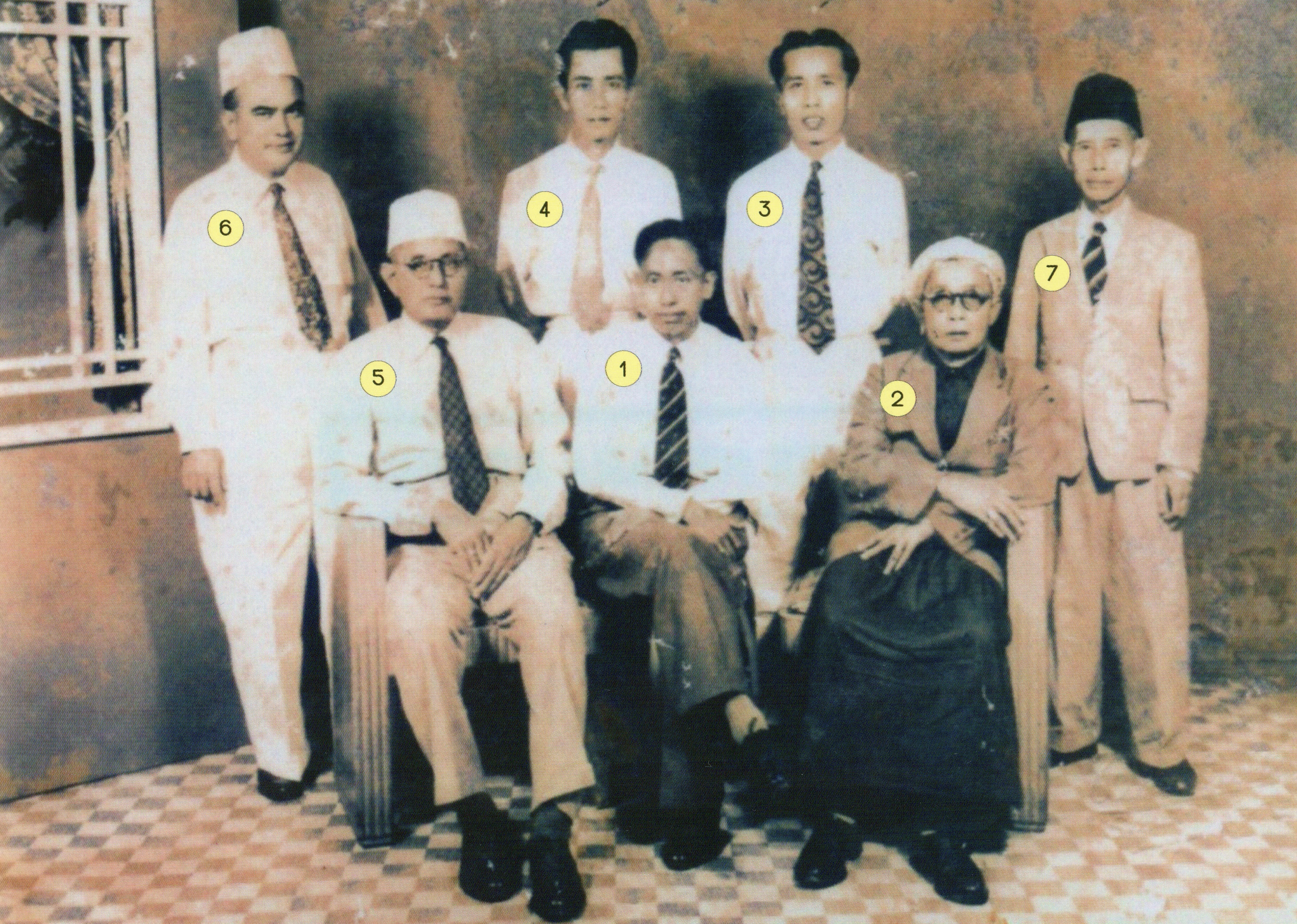
Pengiran Muhammad Ali (no. 3) in a group photograph with the other six members of the Tujuh Serangkai

Pengiran Muhammad Ali was appointed as an assistant teacher at Kuala Belait Malay School before becoming headmaster of Sengkurong Malay School in 1941. Upon returning home, he served as a senior teacher from 1939 to 1943 and was a founding member of the PGGMB, which was registered in 1939 but soon disrupted by the Japanese invasion. Following the war, he did not participate in the activities of Barisan Pemuda. In 1953, he was appointed as a member of the Tujuh Serangkai, a constitutional advisory committee. The following year, as a school teacher, he was selected as an observer in the State Council, representing the Brunei–Muara District. His role was to listen to discussions and report back to the District Advisory Council (DAC), with limited opportunities to speak unless permitted by Sultan Omar Ali Saifuddien III and the British Resident. From November 1954 until January 1957, he attended the State Council in this capacity.

During this period, Pengiran Muhammad Ali became an outspoken critic of the government, using his position to challenge policies in the State Council. Between 1954 and 1955, he was among the vocal teachers chosen as observers in the expanded State Council, which increasingly questioned and criticised British administration. Alongside figures like Marsal, he played a key role in transforming the council into a platform for debate, frustrating British officials. In 1954, he joined a two-week study tour of Malaya, where the committee examined governance, constitutional matters, religious affairs, and development. He recalled receiving advice from their Malay counterparts, who stressed the importance of preserving Brunei as a Malay Islamic sultanate to safeguard it from foreign influence.

"In June 1956, Anthony Abell instructed the incoming British Resident, Dennis White, to curb the influence of Pengiran Muhammad Ali and Marsal over the sultan. Despite this, from 1957 to 1959, Pengiran Muhammad Ali remained an unofficial member of the State Council while also serving as a Malay inspector of schools from 1957 to 1958. During this period, he was appointed chair of the committee on National Education Policy in 1957, following his role as coordinator of the Schools Feeding Program in 1956. In 1958, as chairman of the Brunei–Muara DAC, he stated that he would refer the sultan's proposal to appoint a chief minister and abolish the British Resident back to his council members for discussion. That same year, he was part of the Brunei delegation to London for constitutional talks, which included Omar Ali Saifuddien and other key Malay members of the State Council. They were advised by Panglima Bukit Gantang and Neil Lawson, a lawyer who had played a role in Malaya's constitutional negotiations.

Pengiran Muhammad Ali played a key role in constitutional debates, particularly on 9 April 1958, when he clarified in a State Council meeting that the sultan would act on advice only if he deemed it beneficial to the state—contrasting with the 1905/1906 agreement, which required the British resident's advice to be followed. In May 1958, alongside Marsal and Abdul Hapidz, he proposed Brunei's withdrawal from the inter-territorial conference, arguing it provided no clear benefits to the state. Although Omar Ali Saifuddien did not decide immediately, Brunei’s participation in the conference soon ended. In June 1958, a report by E.R. Bevington, endorsed by Abell, blamed Pengiran Muhammad Ali, Marsal, and Pengiran Yusuf for causing political difficulties in Brunei, accusing them of dominating State Council discussions, influencing Omar Ali Saifuddien, and pushing for constitutional amendments. Earlier, in February 1958, Pengiran Muhammad Ali, along with Pengiran Yusuf and Marsal, had been appointed by the State Council to review the draft agreement between Brunei and the United Kingdom, insisting on independent discussions before presenting a revised draft for British consideration. Following this, he was elevated to chief inspector of schools on 11 August 1958.

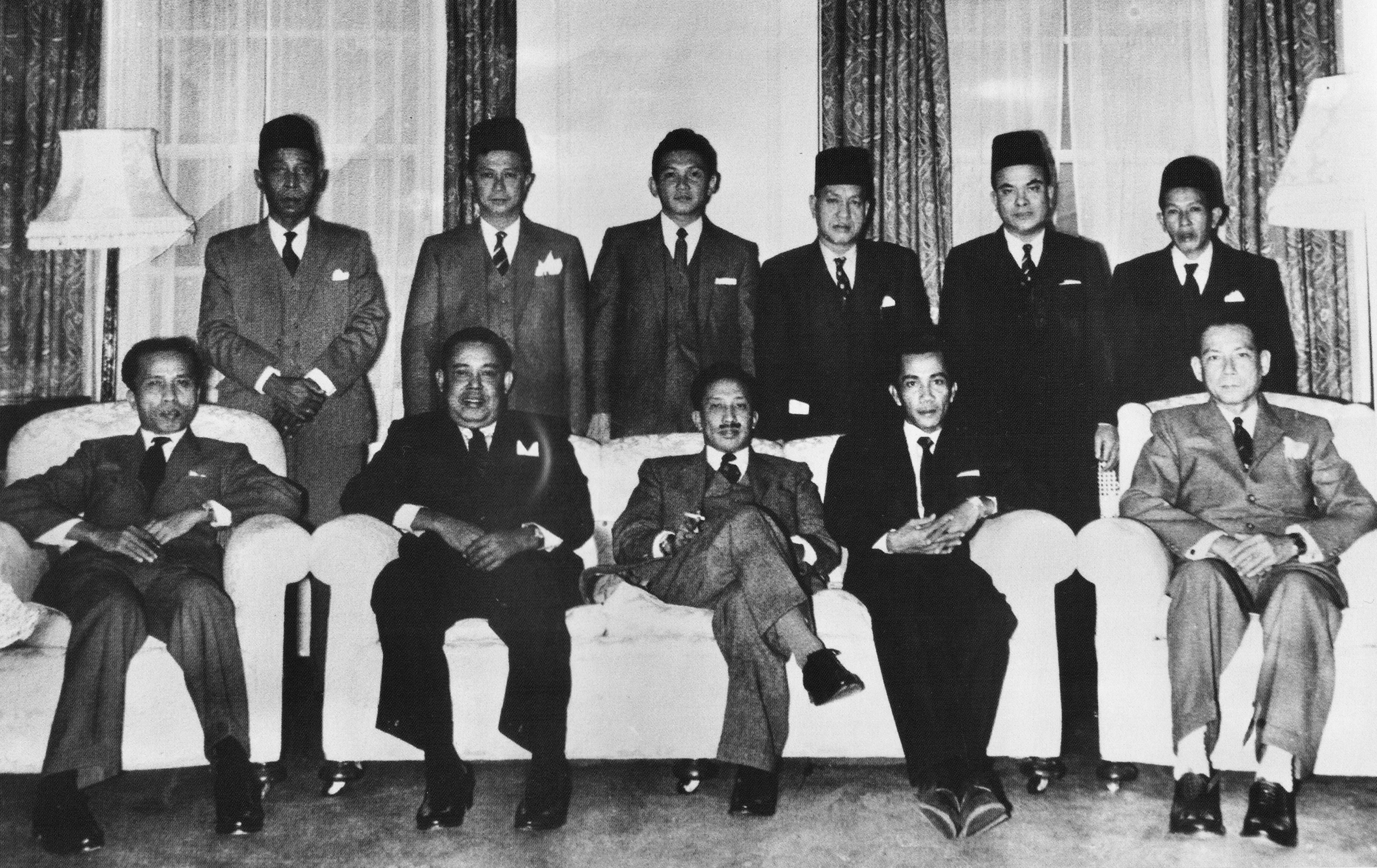
Pengiran Muhammad Ali (seated first from the left) with the 1959 constitutional delegation in London

In 1959, Pengiran Muhammad Ali traveled to London as part of the sultan's constitutional delegation and participated in the London Conference on 23 March, where discussions focused on Brunei’s future constitutional arrangements. He attended six plenary sessions alongside senior officials such as Chief Minister Ibrahim Mohammad Jahfar, Marsal, and legal advisers. Later that year, he witnessed the granting and signing of Brunei's constitution at the Lapau on 29 September. Following the adoption of the 1959 constitution, he was appointed as the acting head of the Brunei Islamic Religious Council. From November 1959 to August 1962, he served as an unofficial member of both the LegCo and Executive Council.

In December 1960, he was involved in a walkout by the sixteen unofficial members of the legislative council after their proposals were rejected by Omar Ali Saifuddien. The members protested that motions passed by the council required the sultan's approval to be acted upon, which they believed undermined their authority. The crisis was later resolved when Omar Ali Saifuddien privately met with the members, and to ease tensions, Pengiran Muhammad Ali was promoted from school headmaster to state religious affairs officer.

=== State religious affairs officer ===
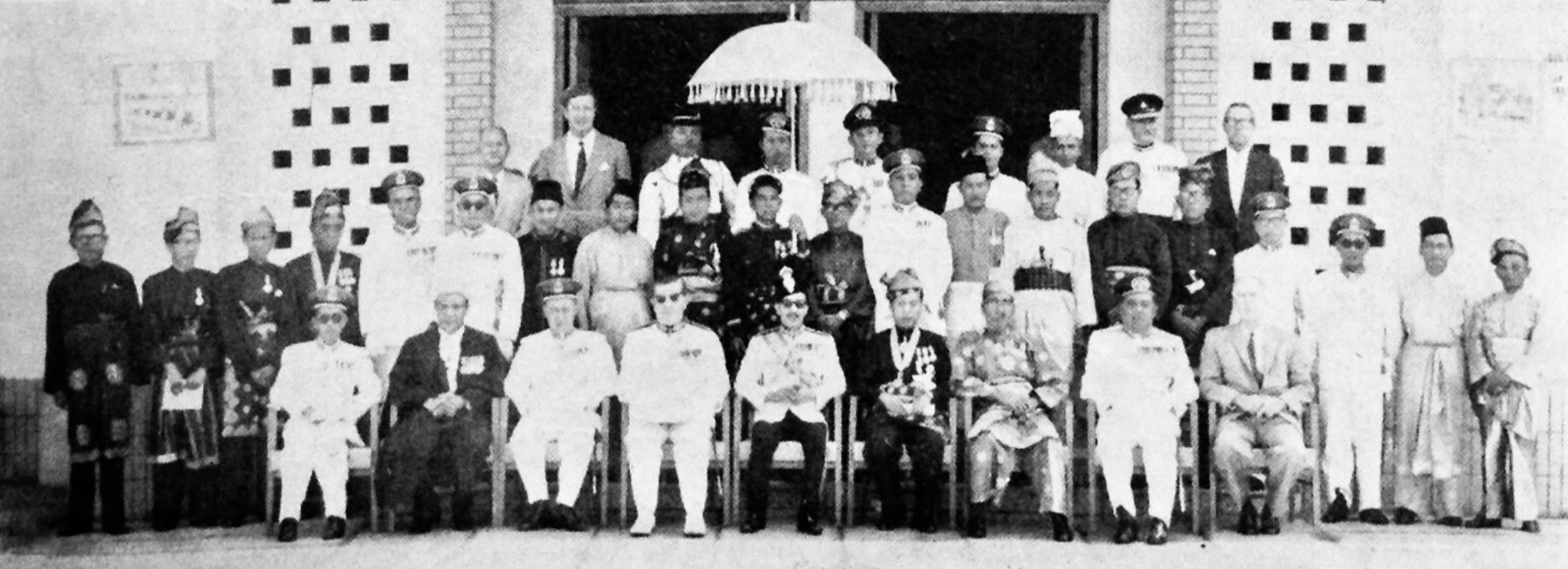
Pengiran Muhammad Ali (seated fourth from the right) as the Speaker of the 1961 LegCo

From 1961 to August 1962, Pengiran Muhammad Ali served as the state religious affairs officer. In July 1961, Pengiran Muhammad Ali joined a delegation to Kuala Lumpur to resolve staffing tensions with the Malayan government. Omar Ali Saifuddien, reluctant to request the return of Malayan officers, secured replacements through negotiations. Following this, he remained head of religious affairs while Marsal was promoted to acting chief minister, and Pengiran Yusuf became deputy state secretary. Abell viewed all three as ardent nationalists who had previously opposed British influence in Brunei. On 29 July, the Standing Advisory Council on Defence, chaired by the sultan, convened to discuss internal security. With Ibrahim on medical leave, Omar Ali Saifuddien appointed his closest advisers, including Marsal and Pengiran Muhammad Ali, to join the council. They discussed potential law and order breakdowns and authorised the chief police officer to seek assistance from Sarawak and North Borneo while mobilising the Oilfields Security Force.

In late August 1961, as Omar Ali Saifuddien distanced himself from Malayan influence, he turned to his traditional advisers, including Pengiran Muhammad Ali, Marsal, and Pengiran Yusuf, who were believed to favour an isolationist stance. Despite constitutional and treaty constraints, the sultan later declared his support for the Malaysia Plan in November without consulting the Executive Council, relying on advice from Pengiran Muhammad Ali and others. In December, he attended the second Malaysian Solidarity Consultative Committee (MSCC) meeting in Kuching as an observer and signed the final memorandum, suggesting Brunei's tentative support for Malaysia. In his speech, he criticised opposition to the plan as unconstructive and questioned whether a northern Borneo federation would secure the sultan’s sovereignty or gain acceptance from Sarawak and North Borneo, reflecting Brunei's concerns about its role in the proposed federation.

=== Deputy chief minister of Brunei ===
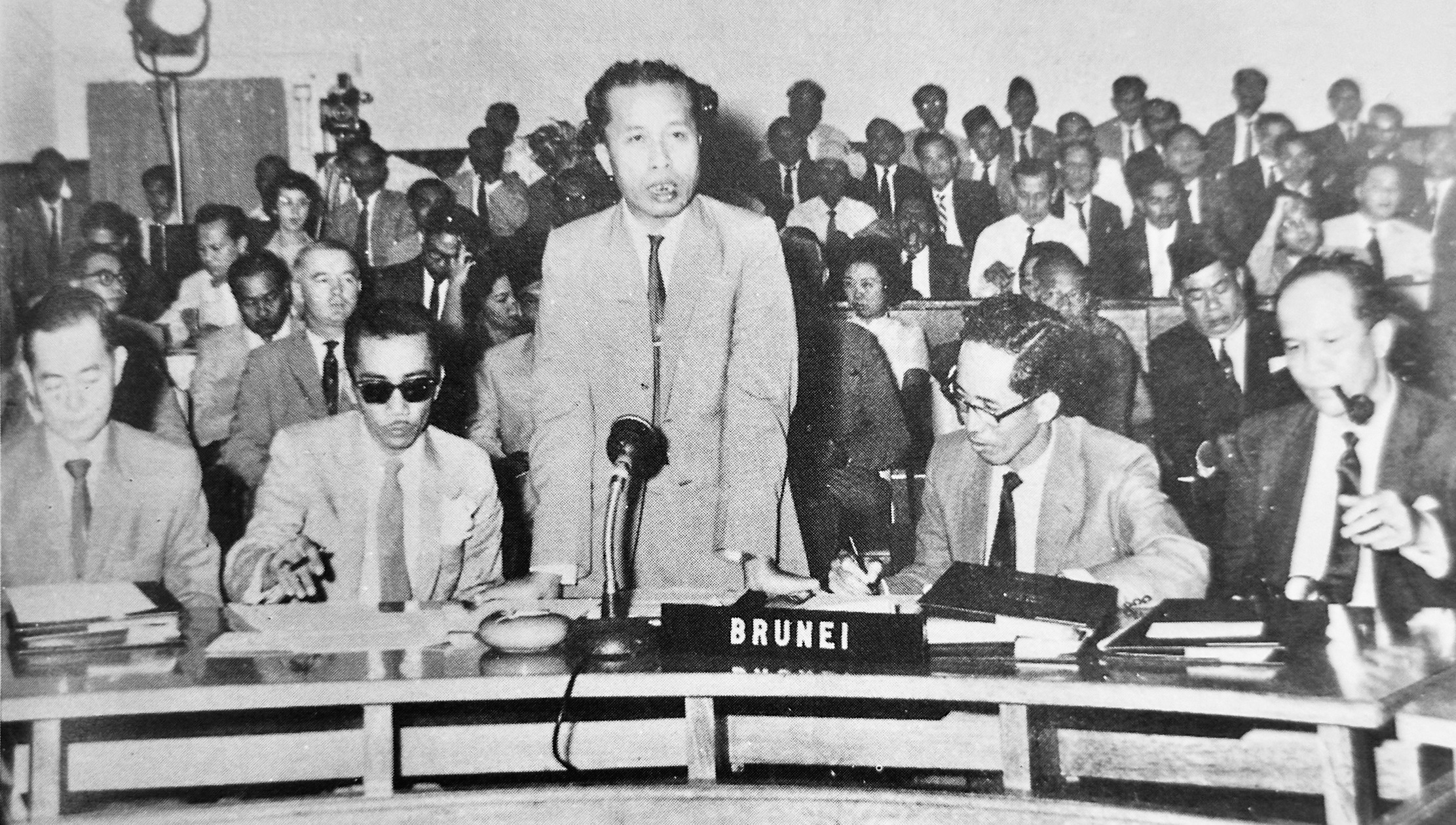
Pengiran Muhammad Ali (centre) giving a speech at the MSCC meeting in 1962

At the final MSCC meeting in Singapore on 7 February 1962, the Malaysia Plan was agreed upon with protections for Borneo territories. A memorandum, signed by all delegates, including the Brunei representatives, was submitted to the Cobbold Commission. The Brunei delegation consisted of Pengiran Yusuf, Pengiran Muhammad Ali, Jamil, Lim Cheng Choo, and adviser Abdul Aziz Zain. In March, while Pengiran Muhammad Ali and Yusuf openly supported the plan and signed the MSCC memorandum, Abdul Aziz informed White that Marsal and Ibrahim were wavering in their support. From March to September, Ali briefly served as speaker of the Legislative Council. On 23 September, Omar Ali Saifuddien appointed him deputy chief minister, alongside the reconfirmation of Marsal as chief minister, to strengthen the government ahead of Partai Rakyat Brunei (PRB) members joining the councils. Two days later, he joined a Brunei delegation led by Marsal for exploratory talks with the Malayan government in Kuala Lumpur.

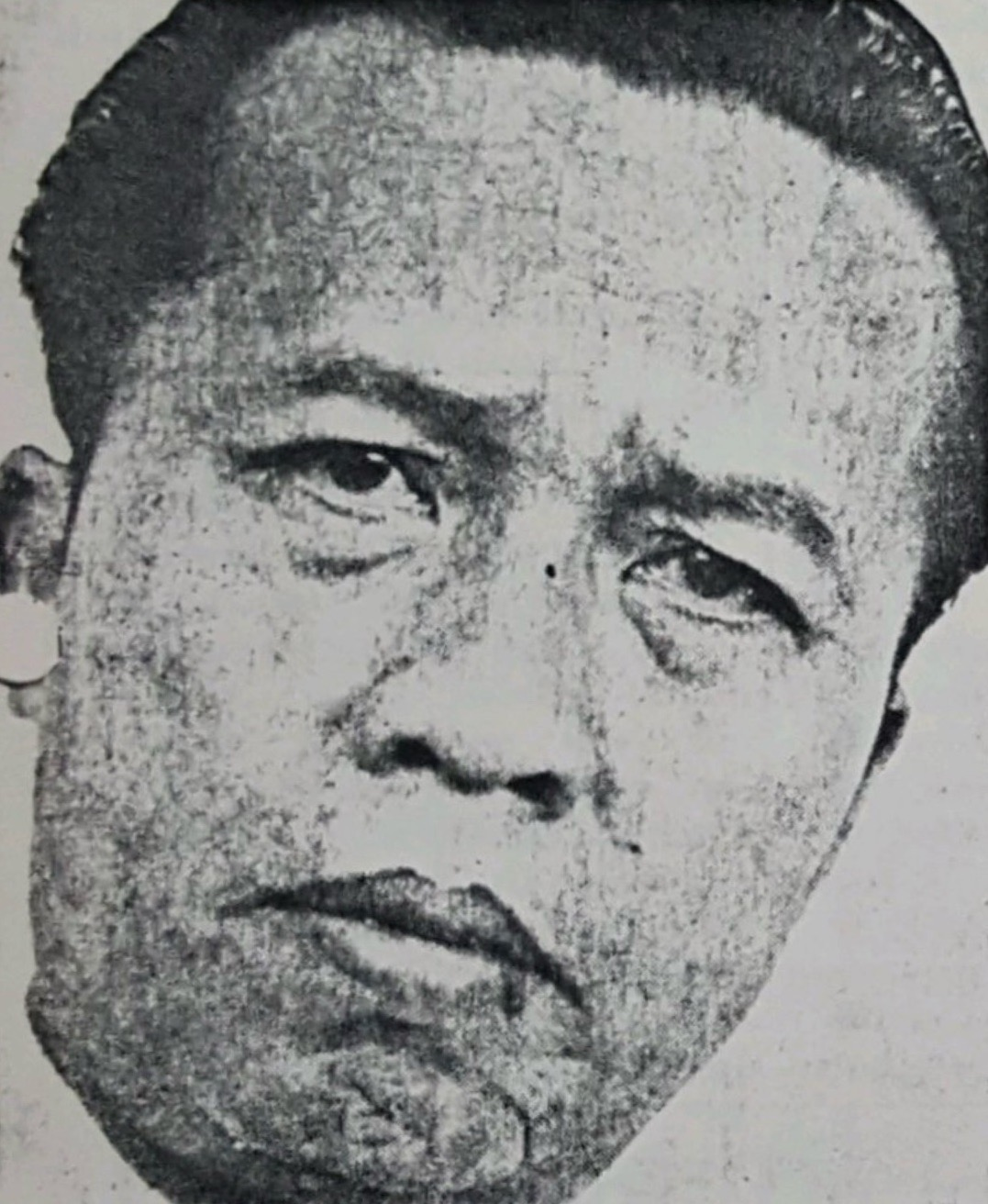
Pengiran Muhammad Ali, c. 1963

In December 1962, Omar Ali Saifuddien expressed his positive view of the Malaysia proposal, calling it "very attractive" due to the shared ties of religion, race, custom, and culture among the Malaysian states. This decision was influenced by the new attorney general, Abdul Aziz, and supported by Marsal, Pengiran Yusuf, and Pengiran Muhammad Ali. These leaders had helped clean up the state government, with Marsal and Pengiran Yusuf clearing a backlog of 600 files and passing key legislation, such as the Nationality Enactment, during the LegCo's budget session. Following the 1962 rebellion, the sultan sent Pengiran Muhammad Ali and Jamil to Kuala Lumpur for preliminary discussions on Brunei's terms for joining the proposed Malaysian Federation. However, during the 1963 negotiations, Omar Ali Saifuddien sought safeguards, particularly regarding oil revenue control, leading to a breakdown in talks. Brunei ultimately chose not to join the federation in July 1963, remaining a British protected state until its full independence in January 1984.

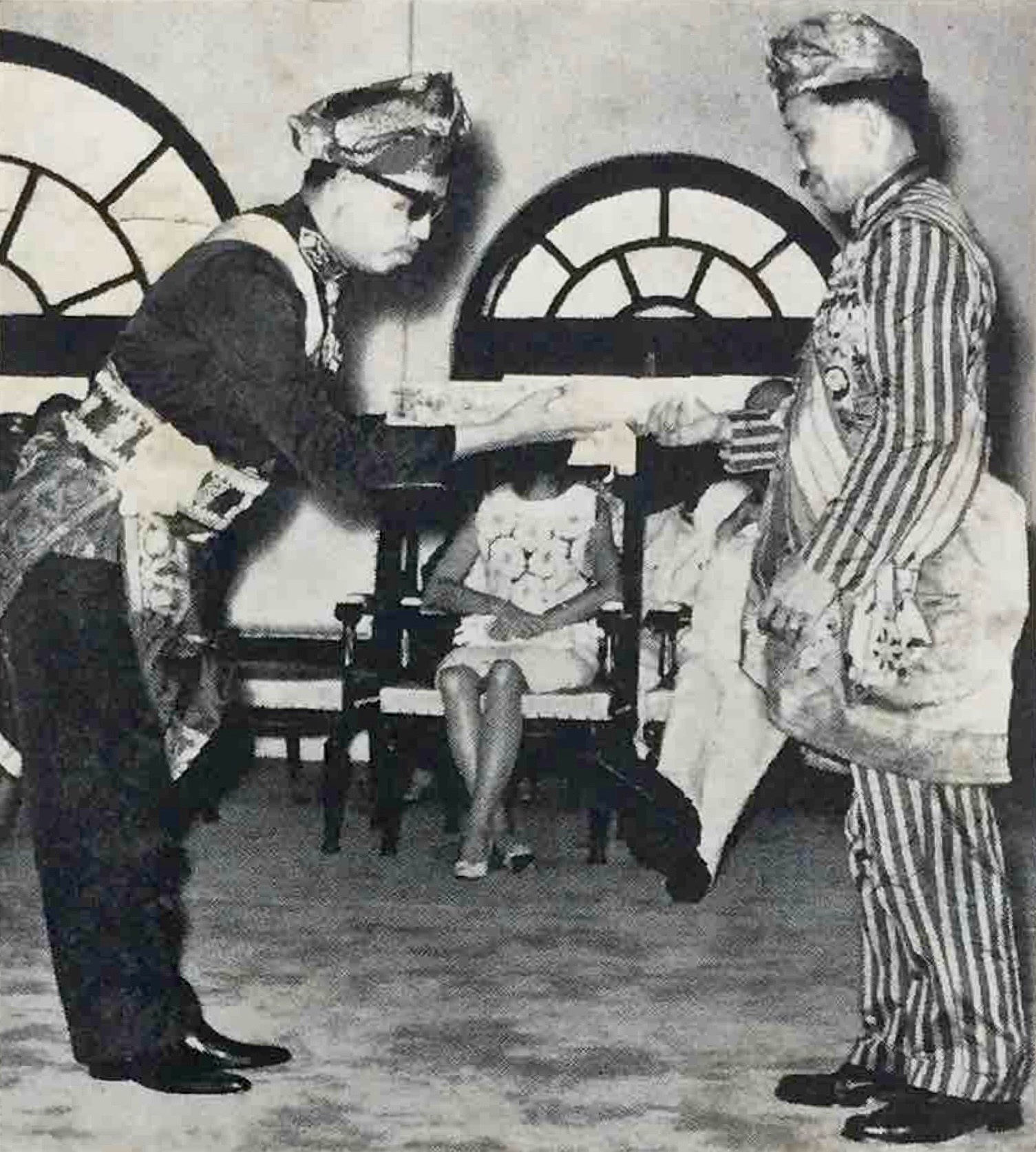
Pengiran Muhammad Ali (left) receiving his letter of appointment from the sultan in 1964

In late March 1963, the Brunei government made significant progress towards a decision on Malaysia, with a majority of the sultan's advisory council voting in favour of the proposal. However, tensions arose between Marsal and Pengiran Muhammad Ali, particularly over the report of the Malaysia commission. Marsal criticised Malayan officers, straining his relationships with them. The rift between Marsal and Pengiran Muhammad Ali was resolved with the help of Pengiran Yusuf, and Marsal, along with another member, changed their votes, leaving only Noor Abdul Razak opposed to Malaysia. The attorney general also worked on persuading A. M. Azahari to approve the proposal. He signed an agreement on behalf of the sultan's government with Clark (Brunei) Oil and Refining Corporation from Milwaukee, in a ceremony held inside the Secretariat Building. He resigned in 1965 to run for the district council and left his post as deputy chief minister on 18 September 1965, after being granted 436 days of leave.

=== Transition from politics to business ===
After leaving the administration, Pengiran Muhammad Ali entered politics, though with limited success. His involvement was unwelcome to Omar Ali Saifuddien, who sought complete control over the government and rejected any form of power-sharing, preferring instead to rule with a new generation of native technocrats educated overseas, particularly in Britain. He was first elected to the Brunei–Muara District Council in a by-election on 23 October 1965, and on 30 October, the Borneo Bulletin cautioned that his victory should not be seen by minor royalty and officials as a triumph for the established order. In December of the same year, he founded Partai Kemajuan Rakyat (PAKAR), which was officially registered in February 1966 as a political party limited to Malays and indigenous peoples. He called for amendments to the 1959 constitution, arguing that it was inadequate for establishing an effective parliamentary government, with his main objective being to unite Brunei's nationalists under a single front for constitutional reform.

On 12 February 1966, Pengiran Muhammad Ali criticised the constitution, stating that it would lead nowhere and that the people would never have sufficient say in state affairs. However, on 26 February, he was accused of political opportunism by BARA's secretary, Abdul Latif Hamid, who argued that he had only now deemed the constitution inadequate and had done nothing for the people while serving as deputy chief minister. A nationalist and royalist, Pengiran Muhammad Ali likely saw an opportunity to regain power by stepping into a political vacuum after his split with the sultan. In August 1966, following strong support, PAKAR was officially launched in Brunei Town.

On 31 July 1966, Pengiran Muhammad Ali became the founder and chairman of Brunei People's Independence Party (BAKER) after PAKAR merged with Barisan Rakyat Brunei (BARA). He later contested two by-elections for the LegCo in Temburong District but was unsuccessful in both, losing in January 1968 and again in April 1969. Disillusioned by the challenges of politics, Pengiran Muhammad Ali shifted his focus to business. By around 1996, he was serving as chairman of Swee Sendirian Berhad.

== Death and funeral ==
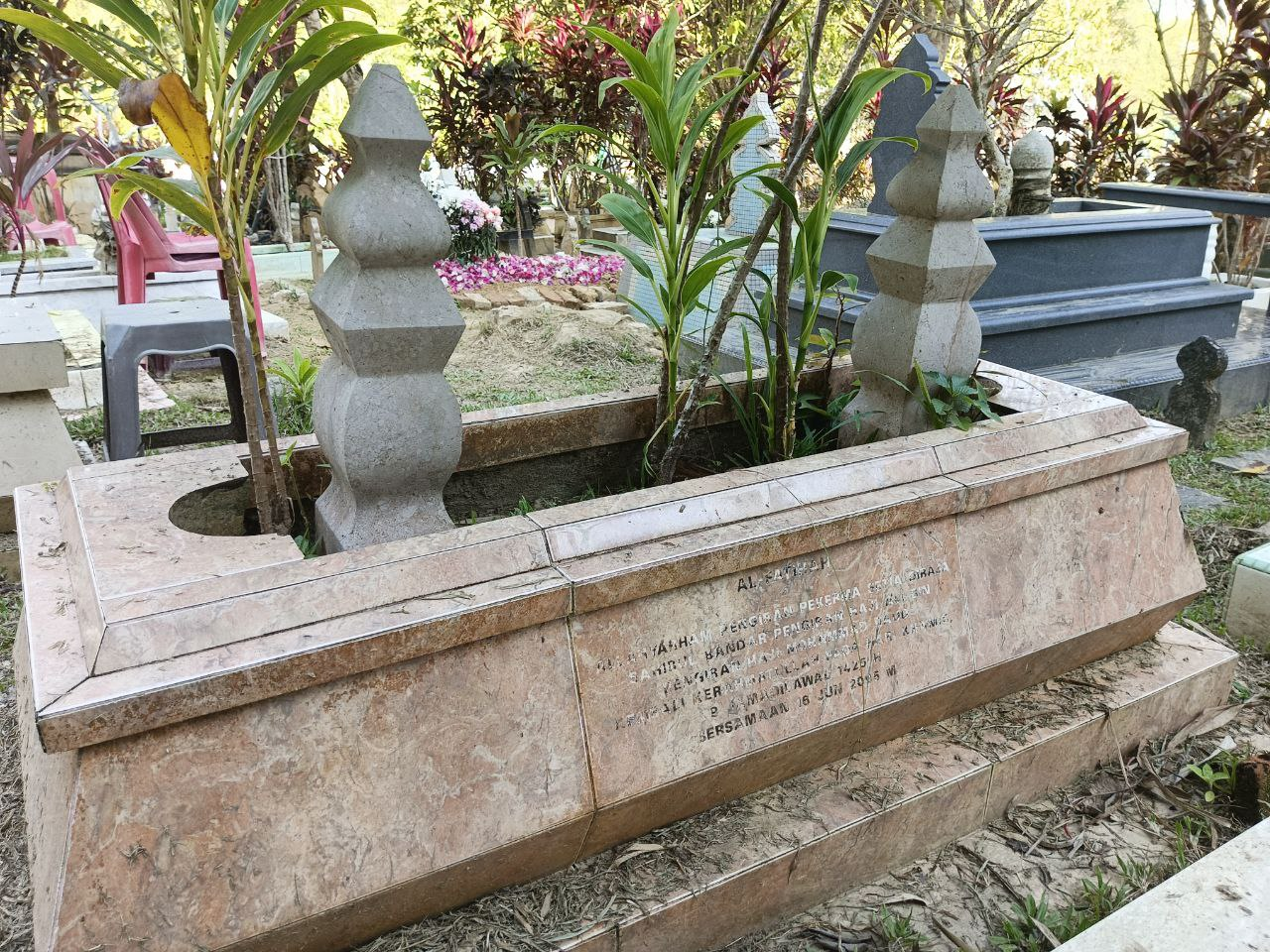
Grave of Pengiran Muhammad Ali at the Royal Mausoleum in Jalan Tutong

Pengiran Muhammad Ali died at his home in Kampong Madewa on 16 June 2005, at the age of 89. Prince Mohamed Bolkiah, the deputy sultan, attended his funeral to pay his respects. In line with the wishes of Sultan Hassanal Bolkiah, the national flag was flown at half-mast across the country in honour of him. He was laid to rest at the compound of the Royal Mausoleum in Jalan Tutong.

== Personal life ==
Pengiran Muhammad Ali married Hajah Nahriah around 1971, and they had several children, including Pengiran Kerma Raja Pengiran Haji Kamarulzaman, who married Princess Amal Nasibah on 19 July 1979. According to White's March 1962 report, Pengiran Ali's wife is a relative of Azahari.

== Titles, styles and honours ==
=== Titles and styles ===
Personal standard of Pengiran Pekerma Setia Diraja Shahibul Bandar

On 19 April 1975, Pengiran Muhammad Ali was honoured by Sultan Hassanal Bolkiah with the cheteria title of Pengiran Pekerma Setia Diraja Sahibul Bandar, bearing the style Yang Amat Mulia.

=== Awards ===
He has been given the following awards:

- Tokoh Guru Berbakti (1994)
- Pingat Guru Berjasa
- Jasawan Ugama Negara Brunei Darussalam (8 May 1997)

=== Honours ===
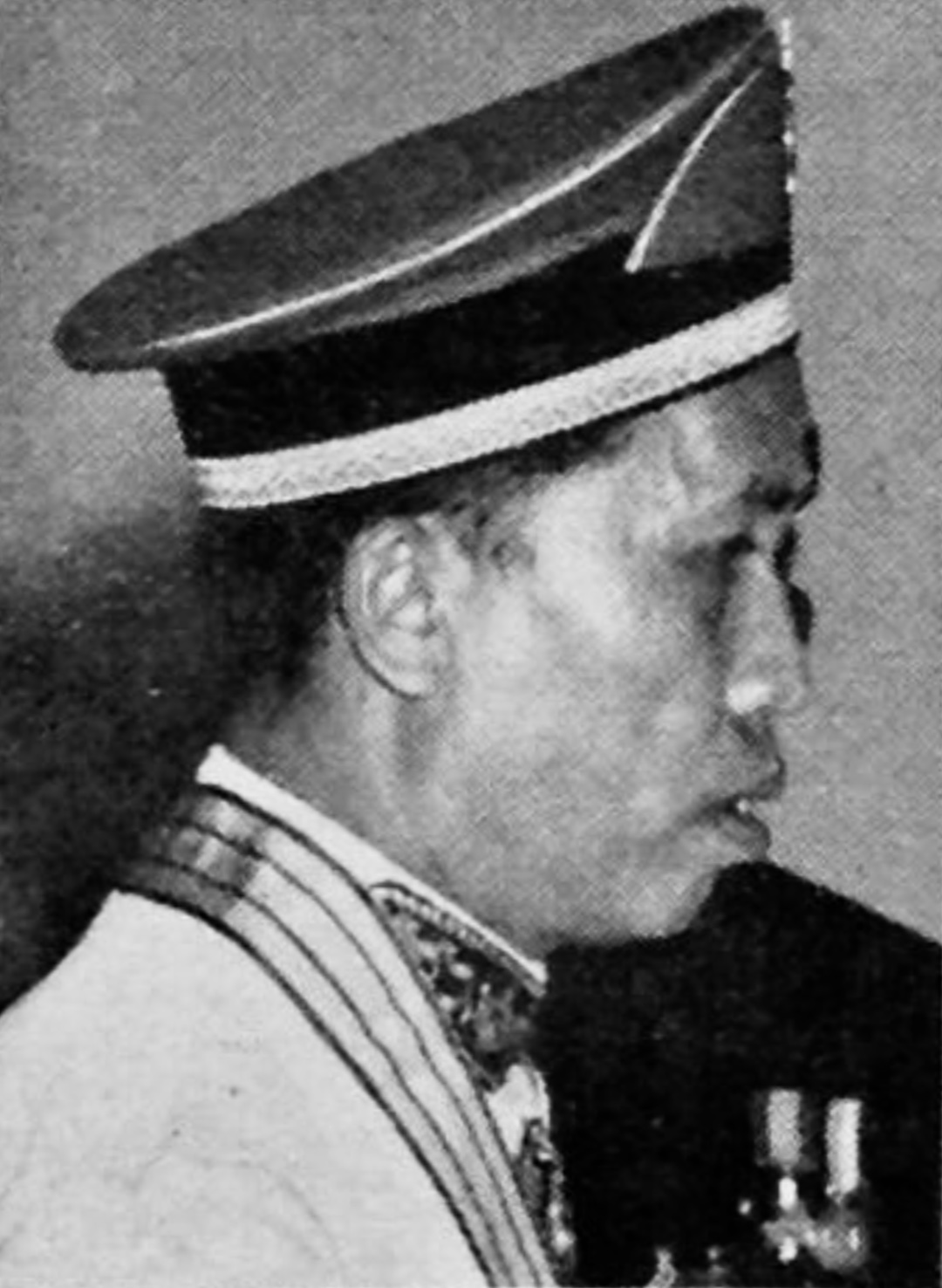
Pengiran Muhammad Ali in 1961, dressed with his DSNB and court uniform

Pengiran Muhammad Ali has been bestowed the following honours:

- Order of Paduka Seri Laila Jasa First Class (PSLJ; 10 February 1976) – Dato Paduka Seri Laila Jasa
- Order of Seri Paduka Mahkota Brunei First Class (SPMB; 23 September 1963) – Dato Seri Paduka
- Order of Seri Paduka Mahkota Brunei Third Class (SMB; 23 September 1958)
- Order of Setia Negara Brunei Second Class (DSNB; 24 November 1960) – Dato Setia
- Sultan Hassanal Bolkiah Medal (PHBS; 1975)
- Omar Ali Saifuddin Medal (POAS; 1961)
- Meritorius Service Medal (PJK; 23 September 1959)
- Long Service Medal (PKL; 1956)

=== Things named after him ===
- Pengiran Pekerma Setia Diraja Sahibul Bandar Primary School, is a school in Kampong Perpindahan Mata-Mata.

== Notes ==
Political offices
Preceded by Office established	1st Deputy Menteri Besar of Brunei; 23 September 1962 – 1965	Succeeded by Isa Ibrahim
Preceded by Pengiran Abu Bakar	2nd Speaker of the Legislative Council of Brunei; March 1962 – September 1962	Succeeded by Ibrahim Mohammad Jahfar
Preceded by Office established	1st State Religious Affairs Officer; 1 May 1960 – August 1962	Succeeded by Pengiran Anak Kemaluddin
