= Brunei People's Independence Party =

Former political party in Brunei

Brunei People's Independence Party Parti Barisan Kemerdekaan Rakyat ڤرتي باريسن كمرديكأن رعيت
- Abbreviation: BAKER, PBKR
- President: Zainal Abidin Puteh
- Chairperson: Pengiran Muhammad Ali
- Secretary-General: Abdul Latif Hamid
- Founder: Abdul Hapidz; Pengiran Muhammad Ali
- Founded: August 1966
- Dissolved: 1985
- Merger of: Barisan Rakyat Brunei; Partai Kemajuan Rakyat
- Preceded by: Brunei Alliance Party
- Membership (1975): ▼5,000
- Ideology: Moderate
- Political position: Nationalism
- Religion: Sunni Islam

Brunei People's Independence Party (Note: The "People's Independent Front of Brunei" was another name used.) or natively known as the Parti Barisan Kemerdekaan Rakyat (BAKER), was a political party in Brunei that emerged as a vocal advocate for the country's independence from British protection, parliamentary democracy and national sovereignty. Formed during a period of constitutional debate and political uncertainty, BAKER sought to accelerate Brunei's path to sovereignty and push for greater political representation. The party actively engaged in discussions with the British government and challenged the government's cautious approach to constitutional reforms. Despite its initial momentum, BAKER struggled to gain widespread electoral support, and internal fractures weakened its influence. Following Sultan Hassanal Bolkiah's ascension in 1967 and a series of political setbacks, the party's operations gradually declined, leading to its eventual dissolution by 1985.

== History ==
=== Formation ===
Founders of BAKER

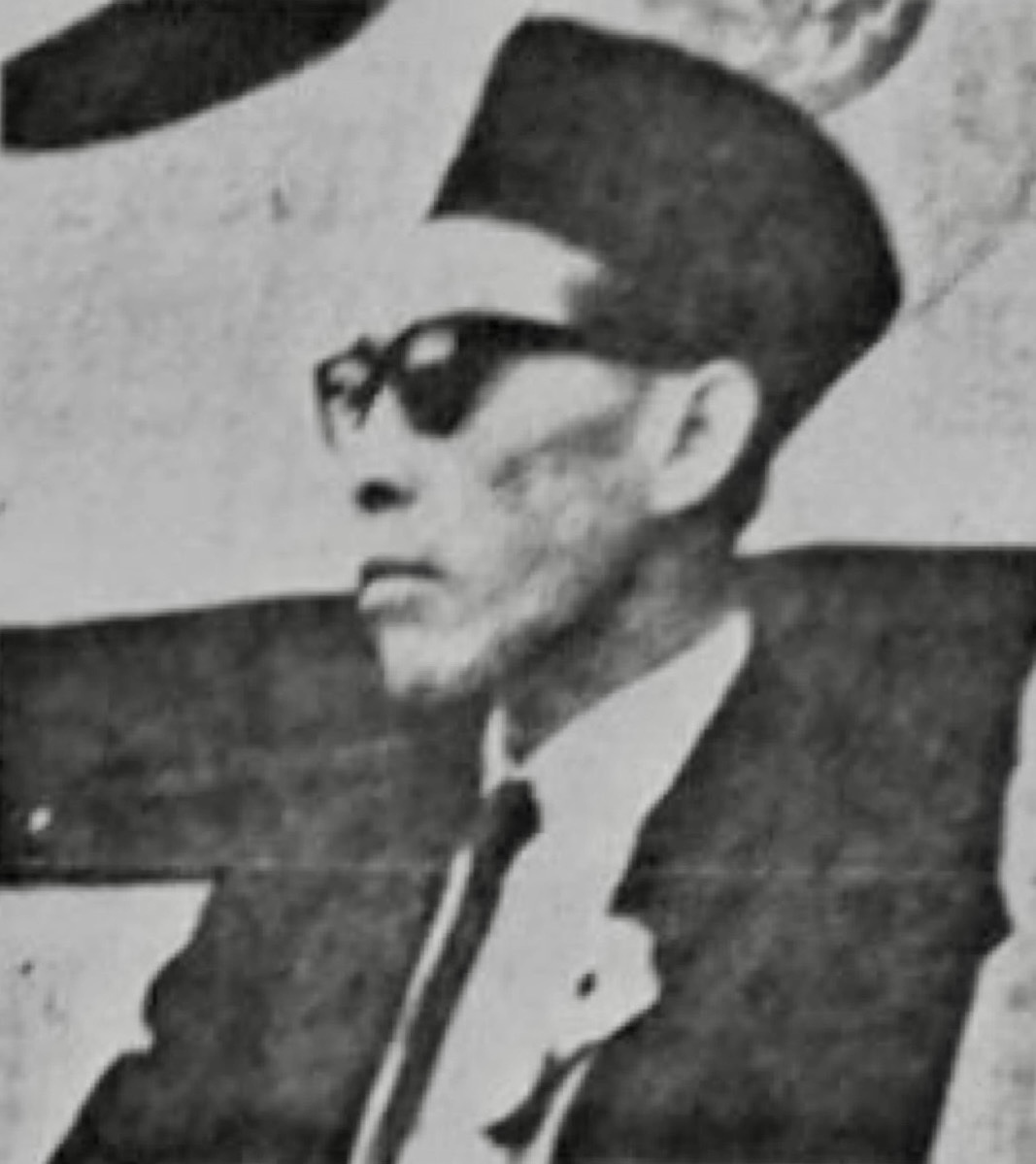
Abdul Hapidz

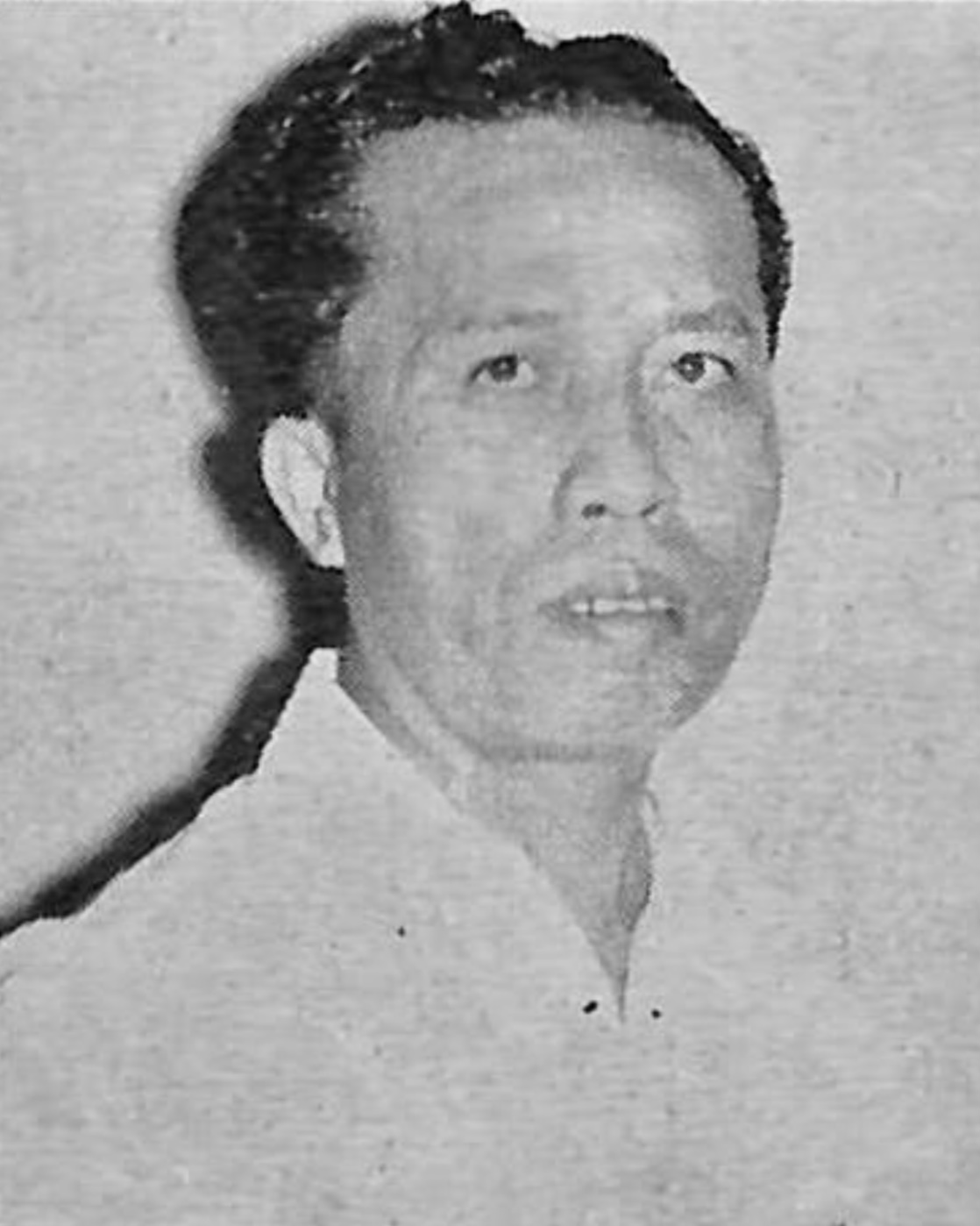
Pengiran Ali

In August 1966, Brunei's political leaders united to form BAKER, a stronger and more organised coalition than its predecessor, the Brunei Alliance Party (BAP). The new alliance emerged from the merger of Barisan Rakyat Brunei (BARA) and Partai Kemajuan Rakyat (PAKAR), following an agreement reached among an impressive gathering of prominent leaders on 31 July 1966. Abdul Hapidz, a former key member of the banned Partai Rakyat Brunei (PRB), led the party, which was established in the wake of the PRB's failed December 1962 uprising. (Note: The British tried to use the BAKER party to further their goals of integrating Brunei into Malaysia. They even freed party president Abdul Hapidz to promote political action in Brunei.) BAKER aimed to strengthen Brunei's political institutions and pressed for swift independence, urging British High Commissioner Fernley Webber to implement the April 1965 accords.

Pengiran Muhammad Ali, the driving force behind BAKER's formation, was elected chairman, while Abdul Hapidz assumed the role of president. Other notable figures involved included Othman Sunggoh, Ghazali Umar, Arshad Marsal, Pengiran Yussof Limbang, Zainal Abidin Puteh, and Abdul Wahab Safar.

"The formation of the new party here is a good sign," remarked Webber during BAKER's launch. Although he typically refrained from involvement in local politics, he acknowledged that the aftermath of the rebellion had created a political void that needed to be filled for the benefit of Brunei and its people. Seizing the moment, BAKER immediately called for independence, believing the timing was ideal.

The easing of regional tensions, particularly in Brunei, following improved relations between Indonesia and Malaysia, further bolstered BAKER's momentum. Former PRB organisers brought their extensive experience in political mobilisation, allowing BAKER to rapidly expand its branch organisations into Seria, Kuala Belait, and Muara. At the same time, members of the Legislative Council (LegCo) openly advocated for the early implementation of the constitutional reforms outlined in White Paper 4/65, amplifying the party's influence both within and outside the LegCo. As the party's presence and demands for reform grew, a confrontation with the government seemed inevitable. Following the LegCo elections on 25 March 1965, BAKER demanded the implementation of the constitutional amendments from White Paper 4/65. Although the paper suggested a ministerial system of governance, Sultan Omar Ali Saifuddien III did not fully adopt it.

=== Rise to popularity ===
BAKER's rise in 1966 closely mirrored the ascent of the PRB a decade earlier, solidifying its status as the most prominent political party of its time. Its formation was, in part, facilitated by covert support from Brunei's British administration, which recognised the need for a structured political entity to negotiate a power transition and ensure the success of meaningful constitutional reforms. Reflecting this, Webber expressed his hope that BAKER would "demonstrate [that] there is a repository of experienced and enlightened political leadership in Brunei in which responsibility for an increased range of public affairs could be invested." This echoed the earlier tacit support that the PRB had received from British officials, first from British Resident John Orman Gilbert and later from Dennis White.

There was minimal opposition to BAKER's application to register as a political party, and it was accepted two days after it was submitted. The party's first priority was to seek an audience with Omar Ali Saifuddien to pay traditional respects, similar to the A. M. Azahari-led PRB delegation's visit in 1962 following their electoral victory. In the second week of October 1966, Omar Ali Saifuddien met with BAKER leaders, Abdul Hapidz and Pengiran Ali, where the conversation was polite but informal, with no formal matters discussed. Omar Ali Saifuddien engaged in lighthearted chat, even asking about the date of an upcoming tug-of-war against his team, to which Ghazali, the head of the Tutong District for BAKER, humorously responded that he dared not play again after losing to the Omar Ali Saifuddien's team in a previous match. Despite the informal nature of the meeting, the party pressed on with its objectives.

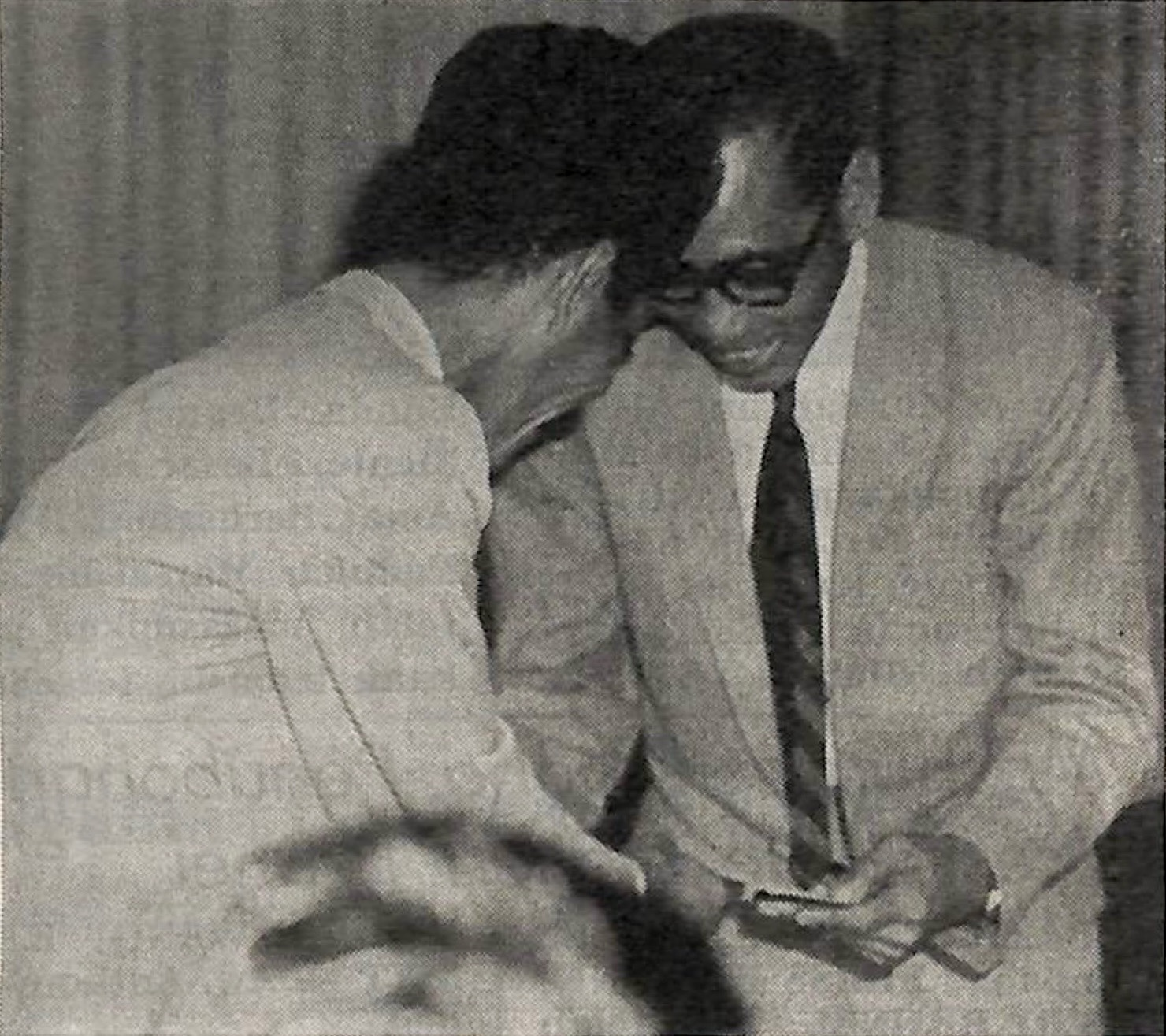
Pengiran Yusuf (left) receiving the constitutional review memorandum from Abdul Hapidz (right) at the Secretariat Building in 1966

In response to Prime Minister Harold Wilson's declaration regarding Brunei in the House of Commons in November 1966, BAKER drafted a memorandum urging Omar Ali Saifuddien to expedite Brunei's independence. The party argued that, due to the requirement for Executive Council members to follow the British high commissioner's instructions, Brunei remained under British colonial influence. The memorandum called for immediate independence and the implementation of the constitutional amendments outlined in White Paper 4/65. On 21 November 1966, the document was presented to State Secretary Pengiran Muhammad Yusuf, and by 26 November, after receiving it, British High Commissioner F.D. Webber agreed to forward it to Secretary of State for Commonwealth Relations, Arthur Bottomley, for further response. Webber expressed the British government's eagerness to see positive constitutional progress in Brunei and showed sympathy for the country’s desire for independence.

=== British–Brunei negotiations ===
While documents related to the British–Brunei negotiations after 1964 remain restricted, it appears that the British only acknowledged Omar Ali Saifuddien's rights to negotiate changes to the 1959 Brunei Agreement as part of Brunei's path to full independence. These negotiations were not attended by representatives from Brunei's political parties. The British government pressured Omar Ali Saifuddien to expedite the May 1965 constitutional reforms by using the agreement as leverage, which he saw as separate from the promises he expected from the British.

Webber, assigned to manage the situation, ultimately disregarded the pressure tactics from political parties. BAKER's President, Abdul Hapidz, held the British government accountable for implementing the proposals in White Paper 4/65. In early February 1967, the British government responded to BAKER's memorandum, expressing support for Brunei's desire for independence. However, the Bruneian government ignored this message and refused to engage with any political party delegations regarding constitutional reforms, leaving BAKER's leaders feeling rejected. By February 1967, London had shown some interest in Brunei's political future, but the Bruneian government remained hesitant. By May, it became clear that the white paper outlining political reforms was merely a statement of intent rather than a concrete plan for change.

Concerned about jeopardising the security agreements established in 1959, Omar Ali Saifuddien traveled to London to prevent full independence. In June 1967, Brunei chose to align its currency with Singapore rather than Malaysia, maintaining economic stability through a currency board. BAKER formally appealed to the British administration, criticising Britain for failing to grant Brunei sovereignty and urging an acceleration of the independence process. The British government responded, stating its readiness to grant independence but placing the responsibility for the delay on Omar Ali Saifuddien. In March 1967, BAKER sent a delegation to meet the sultan, demanding an explanation for his stance. However, he refused to meet them, directing them instead to Arthur Adair. Frustrated by Britain's refusal to act, Omar Ali Saifuddien traveled to London, and on 4 October 1967, he abdicated in favour of his son, Hassanal Bolkiah.

In late April 1967, while Omar Ali Saifuddien embarked on a global tour, visiting Australia, the US, and Europe, with plans to visit the United Kingdom in June for talks at the Commonwealth Relations Office, the BAKER party sought to push for the implementation of constitutional proposals in the White Paper. However, their efforts were rebuffed by the sultan, who remained silent on the matter. During his absence, the Brunei government clarified through the Daily Star that the White Paper was only a statement of intent, with its implementation to occur at a pace deemed suitable by the government, marking a significant setback for both the BAKER party and the Commonwealth Office's hopes for democratic reform in Brunei.

In response to BAKER's May 1967 memorandum, the Bruneian government reiterated that the White Paper 4/65 was merely a declaration of the Omar Ali Saifuddien's intentions and that its implementation would be carried out at a pace appropriate for the welfare of the people. This response dealt a major blow to the BAKER party. In contrast, Webber extended an invitation to a BAKER delegation to discuss their plans in the third week of May 1967, expressing sympathy for the party's demands, particularly their desire to be included in discussions regarding the proposed constitutional reforms.

=== Calls for democratic reform ===
Following Sultan Hassanal Bolkiah's proclamation on 5 October 1967, BAKER's operations sharply declined, and its influence gradually waned amid the ensuing political turmoil. He was under pressure at this point because he was hesitant to adopt a democratic form of governance for fear that it would reduce his absolute power and replace it with a constitutional monarchy. He maintained that his citizens preferred the guided monarchy, which had provided stability and peace to Brunei, and that they were not prepared for such a shift. He was also concerned that Brunei may become more likely to join Malaysia if it adopted a democratic system, particularly since some BAKER party members were drawn to Malaysia's political structure. Abdul Hapidz, had openly expressed his desire for Brunei to eventually merge with Malaysia, stating to Utusan Melayu on 20 October 1967, "We want independence first, after that it will be up to the people. If they want to come into Malaysia, we have no objection."

The BAKER party, alongside the British and Malaysian governments, called on Hassanal Bolkiah to implement a democratic system of government in Brunei. The party urged him to hold a general election in 1968, two years earlier than initially planned. In October 1967, Abdul Latif Hamid, the secretary-general of BAKER, stated that the people of Brunei desired an early election to establish a representative government. In response to the BAKER party's call for an early general election, Omar Ali Saifuddien immediately rejected the claim, stating in an interview with Utusan Melayu that Brunei would not hold a general election for at least ten years. He also reassured Malaysia that British forces would remain in Brunei, despite Britain's plans to withdraw its forces from Singapore and Malaysia. Omar Ali Saifuddien emphasised that the British government would continue to assist Brunei in the event of an attack or external instigation, and he confirmed that the Emergency Regulations in the state would remain in effect.

The Commonwealth Office recognised in November 1967 that unless Brunei's decision reflected the will of the people, it would be dangerous to push for its joining of Malaysia. In a letter to A. H. Reed, Rex Hunt stated that although individuals such as BAKER party president Abdul Hapidz might be able to guide Brunei into Malaysia, he felt that this would be against the desires and interests of the vast majority of Bruneians.

=== Electoral defeat and internal setbacks ===
In the 1968 district council elections, independents secured 28 out of 38 available seats, while BAKER, the only organised political party, won just 24 out of 55. Independent candidates ultimately claimed 70% of the vote, leaving BAKER with only 30%.

The BAKER party's Secretary-General II, Zainal Abidin Puteh, suggested Brunei's independence and the establishment of a democratic regime at a LegCo meeting in May 1968. In order to gauge public opinion on constitutional development and independence, he called for a survey. The need for a democratic system was also reiterated by Pengiran Mohammad Samli Lahab, a spokesperson for the BAKER party's Information Section. Hassanal Bolkiah and Omar Ali Saifuddien were concerned by the BAKER party's persistent demands for independence and constitutional changes, particularly after the British told them that the agreement was about to expire and that the British Gurkha battalion would be leaving Brunei.

The party faced further setbacks in April 1969 when Pengiran Ali, a key supporter, failed in his bid to join the LegCo during a Temburong by-election. However, BAKER's challenges did not end there. In September 1969, three prominent members—Pengiran Mohammed Yusuf, the assistant secretary-general; Pengiran Matussin Lampoh, the first vice-president; and Abdul Hapidz, the party's president—suddenly resigned, citing personal or commercial reasons. Adding to its struggles, BAKER was also denied participation in Brunei’s delegation for negotiations in London in mid-1969.

=== Appeal to the United Nations ===
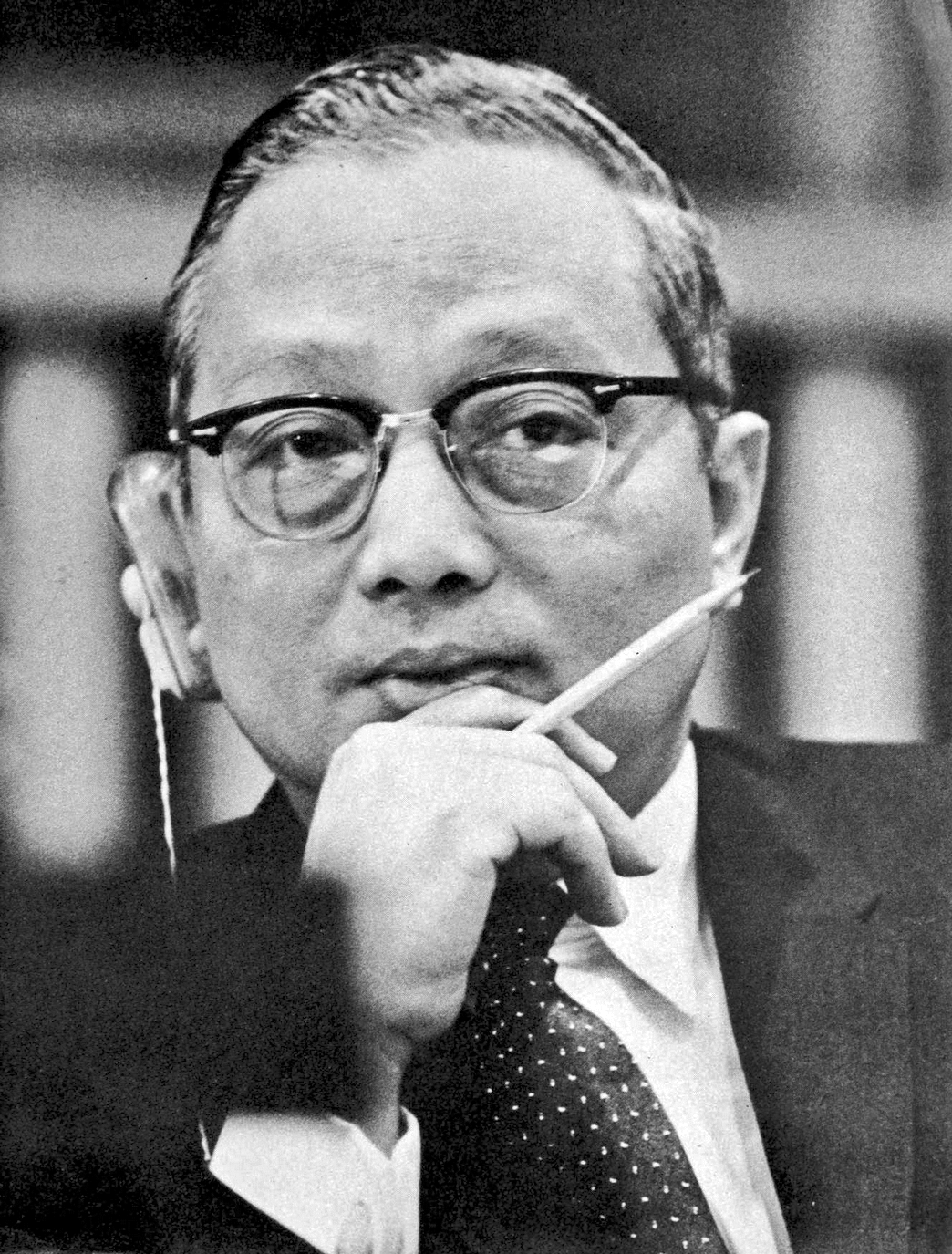
U Thant at a UN Press Conference

BAKER was unhappy with Brunei's delayed independence, which was no longer anticipated by November 1970, and the Conservative government's ascent to power in June 1970. The party's secretary-general, Abdul Latif, responded by writing to U Thant, the Secretary-General of the United Nations (UN), urging support for Brunei's independence and accusing the British government of meddling in its internal matters and trying to extend colonialism. Abdul Latif claimed that the people of Brunei no longer wanted to be influenced by outside forces and urged the UN to take up the country's cause. He also pushed for a free referendum to decide the sultanate's future.

The UN General Assembly's 1960 Declaration on the Granting of Independence to Colonial Countries and Peoples served as the foundation for BAKER's request for Brunei's independence, which was addressed to U Thant. The party also cited Resolution 2621 of 12 October 1970, which called on member states to support the prompt granting of independence to non-self-governing regions and encourage the full implementation of Resolution 1514. In order to eradicate colonialism, the Special Committee on Decolonization (C-24) demanded information from administering powers regarding the areas they controlled. The BAKER party in Brunei held the British administration accountable for making sure the decolonization process was carried out.

By highlighting that Brunei was a self-governing state under the 1959 Brunei Agreement and not a colony, Omar Ali Saifuddien rejected the BAKER party's demands for UN action and said that Brunei was not subject to UN Trusteeship. Nevertheless, the BAKER party's insistence on independence was a problem since it ran the possibility of forcing Britain to give up its remaining obligations and accelerating Brunei's transition to complete independence. In order to avoid this, the Bruneian government took action to put a stop to the BAKER party's political activities. This prevented any more independence-related actions until 1970, when talks with the newly elected Conservative administration began.

The Conservative government's decision to postpone Brunei's independence, particularly its failure to deliver it by November 1970, infuriated the BAKER party. In retaliation, Abdul Latif wrote to the UN requesting support for Brunei’s independence and urged Hassanal Bolkiah to establish a democratic system of governance. These demands put his security at risk, as they could have led Britain to relinquish its responsibilities and force Brunei to become fully independent. In response, Hassanal Bolkiah and Omar Ali Saifuddien postponed the 1970 and 1971 Legislative and District Council elections and extended the state of emergency, effectively ending the BAKER party's political influence and halting Brunei's chance for democracy. The people's lack of interest in democracy, the leaders' failure to establish credible political parties, and Britain's inability to convince Hassanal Bolkiah to adopt a democratic system all contributed to the failure of Brunei's democratic aspirations.

After Hassanal Bolkiah extended emergency powers in March 1971, Abdul Latif wrote to Michael Stewart about Arthur Bottomley's 1965 White Paper, which recommended a full representative system of government for Brunei. In April, Abdul Latif also met with Acting British High Commissioner H.J. Bowe to discuss the 1969 talks between the British and Brunei governments. However, when members of the BAKER party, including Zainal Abidin Puteh and Pengiran Mohammed Yusuf, sought political representation in these negotiations, they were rejected by Brunei's palace officials, including Pengiran Mokhtar Puteh and Jamil Al-Sufri, with the Hassanal Bolkiah making it clear that the talks were solely between him and the British government. In October 1971, the BAKER party submitted a memorandum to the UN seeking support for Brunei's independence. This petition was circulated to the C-24 and was included in their consideration in 1972.

=== Final efforts and disbandment ===
Following Abdul Latif's resignation, the political influence of the BAKER party dwindled to almost nothing. On 7 April 1972, Yaakub Zainal, the party's treasurer, also resigned, leading to the collapse of its leadership. According to the Straits Times, the party's leadership disintegrated, with Zainal Abidin remaining as the only active leader in Seria. The party, once the sole political organisation in Brunei, lacked leadership in the capital, Bandar Seri Begawan. In the end, Hassanal Bolkiah and Omar Ali Saifuddien successfully dismantled the BAKER party’s political activities, and its calls for independence and democratic reform in Brunei effectively ceased.

When Anthony Royle and Omar Ali Saifuddien met in London on 14 June 1972, Sir Omar made it apparent that Brunei had no plans to join the UN or interact with it directly, nor did it want to build ties with any other nation save the UK. This declaration came after Brunei attained complete internal self-government and Britain decided to stop updating the UN on the country's status. At this point, the BAKER party was mostly dormant and had lost much of its legitimacy; the only active member left was Abdul Latif. He persisted in promoting the party's independence agenda, bringing up the subject in gatherings such as the UN General Assembly and the Commonwealth Prime Ministers' Conference. However, after serving in the party for around seven years, he left his post on 12 March 1972. In a news release, the BAKER party demanded the repeal of the state of emergency and the reinstatement of full elections, expressing dissatisfaction over the disregard for the people's desires. They also insisted that the British government carry out its promise to put the 1965 White Paper into effect. In response, in September 1972, British Permanent Representative to the UN Colin Crowe delivered a note to Kurt Waldheim outlining Brunei's and Britain's stances. According to the letter, Britain was no longer authorised to notify Brunei's status to the UN under Article 73(e) of the UN Charter after the 1971 Agreement between Brunei and Britain.

After receiving assurances from the government that they would not be detained, several families who had previously fled to Limbang returned to Brunei in January 1975. The now-defunct BAKER party responded by stating that it supported Hassanal Bolkiah's leadership and for the populace to follow suit. It also vowed to oppose any internal or external initiatives that could cause dissension and treachery. Some thought the party was acting to thwart efforts to bring the outlawed PRB back to life. The BAKER party's president, Zainal Abidin Puteh, called these rebirth attempts pointless and asserted that Bruneians would not back them. Additionally, he said that there were still 5,000 members of the BAKER party. Due to its lack of activity in early 1985, BAKER was deregistered.
