= Kensington College of Business =

Business school in London, England

- Motto: Your Best Way To Be Professional
- Type: HE Institution
- Established: 1982
- Principal: Ian Pirie
- Undergraduates: 1000
- Postgraduates: 2450
- Location: 12 Cavendish Place, London, W1G 9DJ, England; 51.5172°N 0.1442°W
- Campus: Central London
- Colours: Red and Blue
- Nickname: KCB
- Website: http://www.kcb.ac.uk/

Kensington College of Business (KCB) is an independent higher education institution located in Oxford Circus, London, England.

== Background ==
KCB was established in 1982 and celebrated its Silver Jubilee in 2007. It specialises primarily in Business and Information Technology.

KCB concentrates in three areas of education:

- The delivery of pre-university, undergraduates and postgraduates studies
- Providing specialist training to major corporate clients (including Lloyds TSB and Capita Registrars)
- Preparing the students for the qualifications of leading Chartered Professional bodies such as the Chartered Governance Institute (CGI) (formerly the Institute of Chartered Secretaries and Administrators) and the Chartered Institute of Marketing (CIM)

== Associations ==
Kensington College of Business is a London campus of the University of Chester to offer MBA, MSc, BA and BSc programs. Kensington College of Business is a registered centre with the University of London and the University of Wales to deliver the programs and receive validations from the respective universities. KCB also offers courses in collaboration with the University of South Wales, the University of Hertfordshire, and the University of Portsmouth.

KCB created a subsidiary institution named the Laksamana College of Business in Brunei, allowing students there to receive a foundation degree accredited by KCB. These students may then continue their education at KCB in London to receive their university degree.

== Validations ==
All undergraduate and postgraduate programs offered by KCB are validated by the University of Wales with the exception of the Law degree (LLB) which is awarded by the University of London.

KCB itself is accredited to offer HNC and HND courses from BTEC Pearson in Business, while students seeking university degrees must sit for exams at the University of Chester.

== Academics ==
KCB courses validated by the University of Wales include:

- BA-level study in Business Studies, Marketing, Information Technology, Business Accounting and Finance
- MBA-level studies in Health Care Management, Tourism and Hospitality Management, Travel Management, Information Technology Management, Finance, Human Resource Management, Marketing, International Management, Security Management, Banks and Financial Institutions Management as well as General Studies, and
- MSc-level studies in Computing.

KCB courses validated by the University of London include LLB studies.

== Accreditation ==
- Accredited by the Accreditation Service for International Colleges.
- Recognised under the United Kingdom Government's Department of Innovation Universities and Skills List 2 as a Degree Teaching Institution
- Accredited Teaching Centre of the Chartered Institute of Marketing (CIM)
- Approved Teaching Centre of the Chartered Governance Institute (CGI)
