= Pengiran Abu Bakar Salleh =

Bruneian legislative speaker (1907–1974)

Yang Amat Mulia Pengiran Paduka Tuan Sahibul Karib Pengiran Abu Bakar ڤڠيرن ابو بكر DSNB POAS PHBS PJK PKL
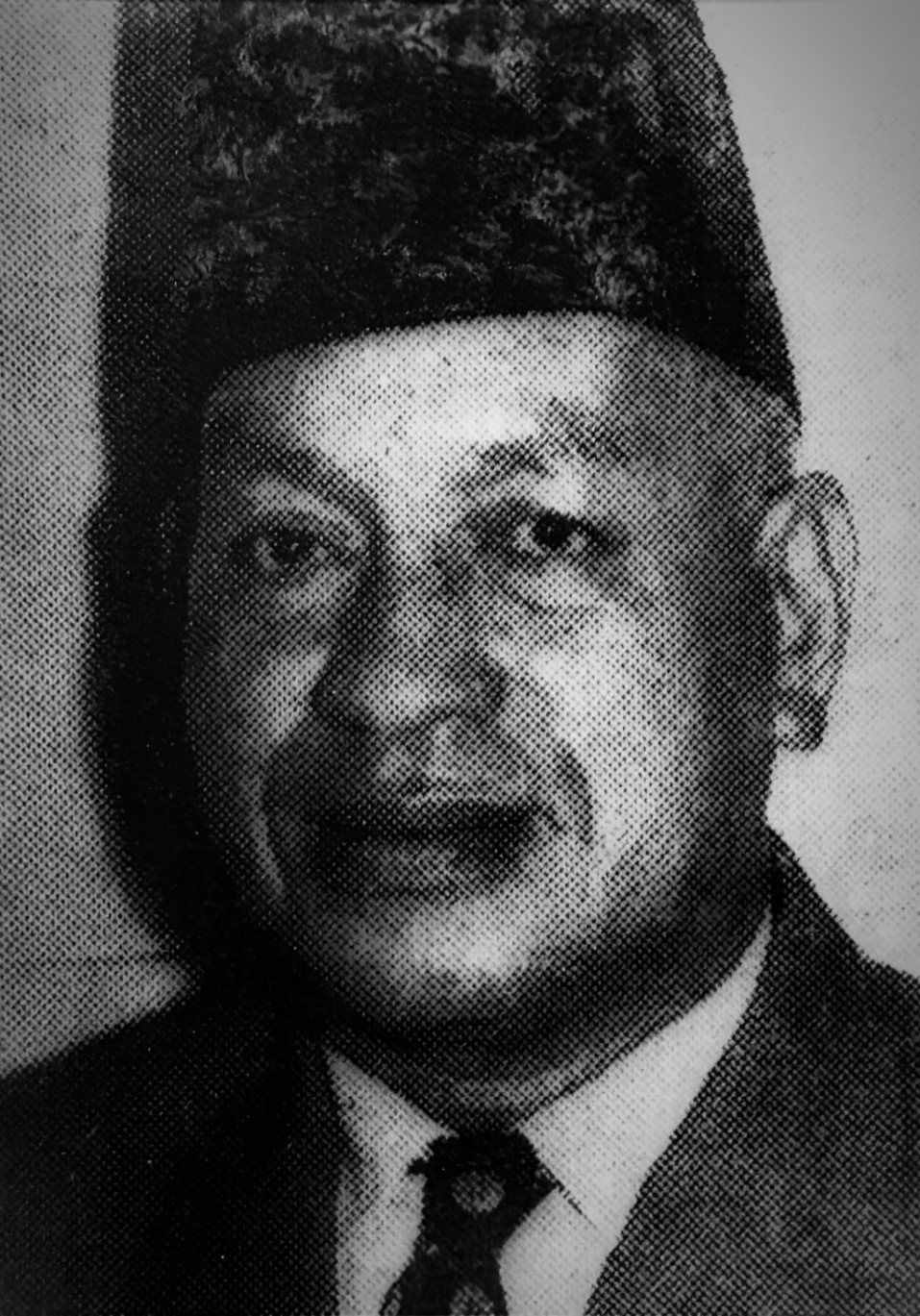
- Pengiran Abu Bakar, c. 1959

1st Speaker of the Legislative Council of Brunei
- In office 29 September 1959 – 1962
- Monarch: Omar Ali Saifuddien III
- Menteri Besar: Ibrahim Mohammad Jahfar; Marsal Maun
- Preceded by: Office established
- Succeeded by: Pengiran Muhammad Ali

Personal details
- Born: 1907 Brunei Town, Brunei
- Died: 7 November 1974 (aged 67) Kampong Tasek Meradun, Brunei–Muara, Brunei
- Resting place: Royal Mausoleum, Bandar Seri Begawan, Brunei
- Relations: Pengiran Anak Muhammad Yasin (brother-in-law); Pengiran Muda Abdul Kahar (nephew); Pengiran Anak Kemaluddin (nephew)
- Children: Pengiran Alauddin
- Parent: Pengiran Anak Mohd Salleh
- Occupation: Civil servant; politician

Pengiran Abu Bakar bin Pengiran Anak Mohd Salleh (Note: His full title is "Yang Amat Mulia Pengiran Paduka Tuan Sahibul Karib Pengiran Haji Abu Bakar bin Pengiran Pemancha Pengiran Anak Muhammad Salleh II.") (1907 – 7 November 1974) was a Bruneian nobleman, civil servant, and politician. He served as the first Speaker of the Legislative Council (Majlis Mesyuarat Negeri) when it held its inaugural session on 21 October 1959. In addition to his role as speaker, he was appointed as a member of both the Privy Council (Majlis Mesyuarat Diraja) and the Executive Council (Majlis Mesyuarat Kerajaan), playing a significant part in Brunei's governance during a crucial period in the nation's history.

== Early life ==
Pengiran Abu Bakar was born in Brunei Town in 1907, the son of Pengiran Pemancha Pengiran Anak Muhammad Salleh II. On 1 January 1929, he started working for the government as a clerk in the British Resident's office. He was appointed Assistant Land Revenue Collector on 1 August 1946, and on 1 February 1947, he was promoted to Administrative Officer Grade II. After a year in this role, he was promoted to district officer of Temburong. On 15 May 1949, he was transferred to Belait District, where he remained until 1 February 1950.

== Political career ==
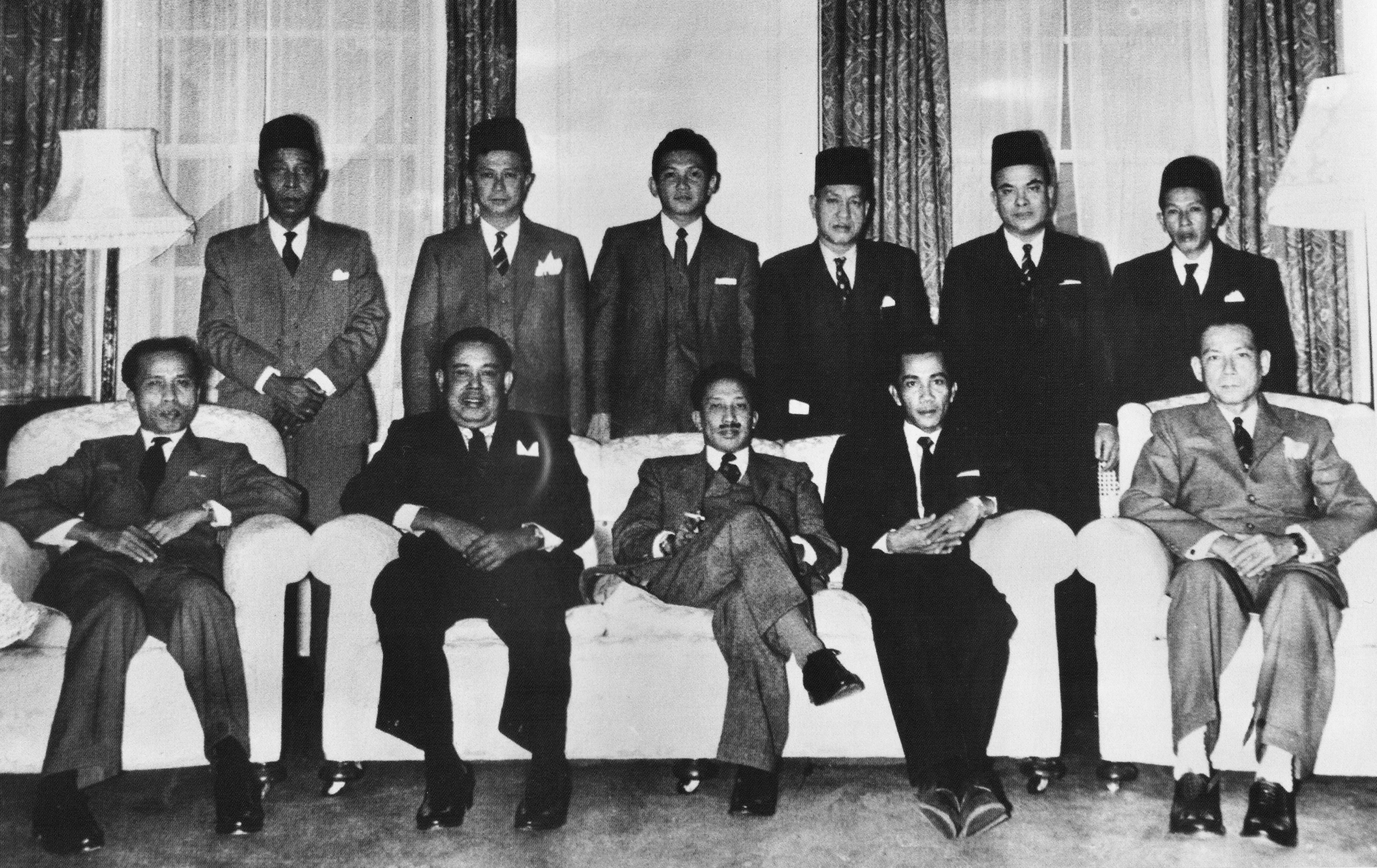
Pengiran Abu Bakar (standing, third from right) with the 1959 constitutional delegation in a group photo

Pengiran Abu Bakar often joined Sultan Omar Ali Saifuddien III on his travels to isolated villages, including Friday prayers at the Kampong Pudak Mosque. He was elevated to Senior Administrative Officer on 1 June 1954, and on 16 February 1955, he was sent to Seria, Belait District. On 15 August 1955, he returned to Temburong in the capacity of district officer. On 1 October 1959, he received a promotion to Special Administrative Officer. At the Sultan's direction, he was one of the 19 members of the Legal Committee in 1957, which was tasked with creating a bill and an educational policy.

In September 1958, Pengiran Abu Bakar and the Sultan traveled to London, United Kingdom, to negotiate for the Constitution of Brunei. After the constitution was put into effect, the Sultan formed an 11-member Citizenship Status Law Committee to examine the legislation that Tuan Sufian bin Haji Hashim had written with help from Michael and Sir Neil Lawson. One of the committee members, Pengiran Abu Bakar, made a substantial contribution to the debates by offering insightful information on the preparation, negotiating, and execution of the constitution.

The Brunei Agreement between Brunei and the United Kingdom, the Constitution of Brunei, and the Succession and Regency Proclamation were among the significant documents that were signed on 29 September 1959, by the Sultan, who represented the Brunei government, Sir Robert Scott, the British High Commissioner for Southeast Asia, and Derek Jakeway, who represented the Governor of Sarawak on behalf of Queen Elizabeth II. Among the fourteen notable state leaders that attended the occasion was Pengiran Abu Bakar. He served as a Senior Administrative Officer and the first Speaker of the Legislative Council when the constitution was established.

== Later life and death ==
Sultan Hassanal Bolkiah named him chairman of the Public Service Commission (PSC) until 31 December 1970, when he was in retirement. In order to have talks with members of the Public Services Commission of Malaya, he led a group of PSC members on an official visit to Kuala Lumpur on 21 November 1962. Following an invitation from Duncan Sandys, the British Secretary of State at the time, under Prime Minister Harold Macmillan, he was a member of the delegation that accompanied Sultan Omar Ali Saifuddien III on 22 July 1963, to lead Brunei's representation in negotiations with the British government regarding Brunei's potential entry into the Federation of Malaysia.

Even after he retired, he was regularly asked to officiate or attend events as an honoured guest. These included the Brunei Belait District Youth Congress on 5 May 1972; the opening of the Orang Kaya Berandai Malay School in Kampong Bukit Sawat on 28 August 1971; the Isra' and Mi'raj celebration in Kuala Belait; the opening of the Chung Hwa Middle School gymnasium in Kuala Belait; and the Student Day celebrations at Muhammad Alam Malay School in Seria on 25 June 1972. He was also a member of the Education Law Drafting and Education Policy Committee, the 1957 State Council, the Privy Council, and the Shariah Council.

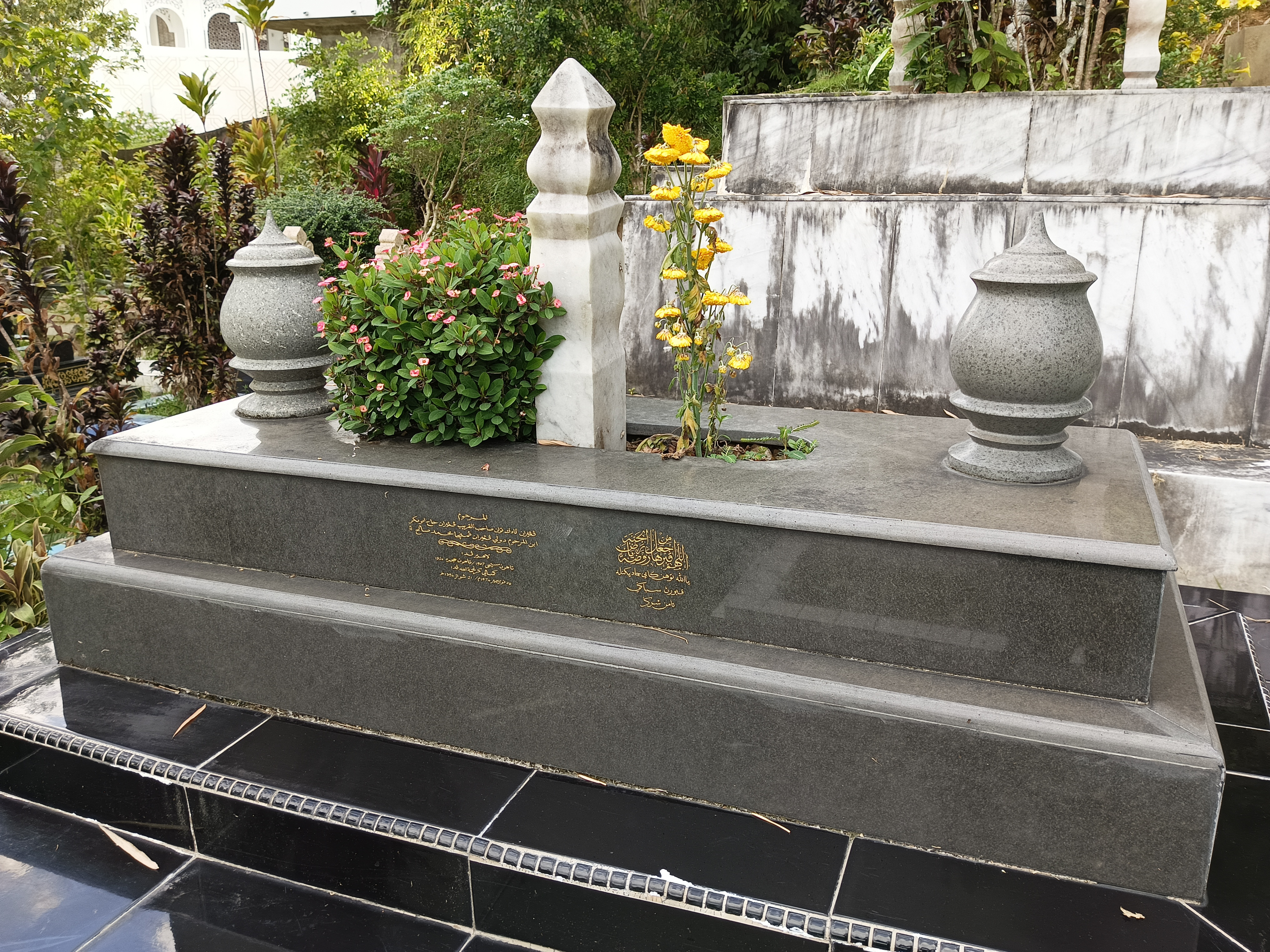
Grave of Pengiran Abu Bakar at the Royal Mausoleum in Jalan Tutong

Pengiran Abu Bakar died on 7 November 1974 at the age of 67. As a mark of final respect, all flags across the nation were flown at half-mast in accordance with Brunei's royal customs pertaining to the passing of a Cheteria.

== Personal life ==
Pengiran Abu Bakar has a son named Pengiran Penggawa Laila Bentara Istiadat Diraja Dalam Istana Pengiran Haji Alauddin, who serves as the Bruneian royal family's Grand Chamberlain. The family resided in Batu 6, Kampong Bunut.

== Titles, styles and honours ==
=== Titles and styles ===
Personal standard of Pengiran Paduka Tuan Sahibul Karib

In recognition of Pengiran Abu Bakar's dedicated service to the nation, retired Sultan Omar Ali Saifuddien III conferred upon him the title of Cheteria 8, Pengiran Indera Mahkota, during a ceremony at Istana Darul Hana in February 1968, granting him the honorific of Yang Amat Mulia. Just three months later, he was elevated to the rank of Cheteria 4 and received the title of Pengiran Paduka Tuan Sahibul Karib, which was later simplified to Pengiran Paduka Tuan.

- February 1968 – May 1968: Pengiran Indera Mahkota
- May 1968 – 7 November 1974: Pengiran Paduka Tuan Sahibul Karib

=== Honours ===
He has earned several honours which included:

- Order of Setia Negara Brunei Second Class (DSNB; 24 November 1960) – Dato Setia
- Omar Ali Saifuddin Medal Second Class (POAS; 23 September 1958)
- Sultan Hassanal Bolkiah Medal (PHBS)
- Meritorious Service Medal (PJK; 23 September 1959)
- Long Service Medal (PKL)
- Omar Ali Saifuddin Coronation Medal (31 May 1951)
- Campaign Medal

=== Things named after him ===
- Jalan Paduka Tuan, a road in Kuala Belait

== Notes ==
Political offices
Preceded by Office established	1st Speaker of the Legislative Council of Brunei; 29 September 1959 – 1962	Succeeded by Pengiran Muhammad Ali
