= Laksamana College of Business =

Private college in Brunei

Coordinates: 4°53′8.6″N 114°55′54.0″E

- Kolej Perniagaan Laksamana
- Laksamana College New Annex Building
- Other name: LCB
- Type: Private (HE) institution
- Established: 18 March 2003
- Founder: Abdul Hapidz
- Academic affiliations: University of Essex, University College Birmingham, University of Sussex, University of Sunderland, University of Bedfordshire, University of South Wales, Northumbria University, De Montfort University, Keele University, Robert Gordon University, Anglia Ruskin University, Culinary Arts Academy Switzerland, University of the West of England, Brunel University, Coventry University, Aberystwyth University, Bangor University, Sheffield Hallam University and Swiss Hotel Management School
- Officer in charge: Dr Sivarajah Subramaniam
- Principal: Ian Pirie
- Director: Ian Pirie; Hj Suhaimei Bin Hj Awg Besar
- Location: Plaza Abdul Razak, Jalan Laksamana Abdul Razak, Bandar Seri Begawan, Brunei Muara, Brunei
- Website: lcb.edu.bn

The Laksamana College of Business (LCB), (Malay: Kolej Perniagaan Laksamana) is an accredited private university college in Brunei. It was the first British college to open a campus as a foreign educational institution in the country, achieved through its partnership with Kensington College of Business, the University of Essex, and Abdul Razak Holdings, in Brunei.

== Background ==
=== History ===
The college was established in 2003 and officially launched on 18 March 2003 by Pehin Orang Kaya Indera Pahlawan Dato Seri Setia Awang Haji Suyoi bin Haji Osman, the Deputy Ministry of Education.

Since its establishment the college has acted as a subsidiary college of the Kensington College of Business. During 2008, the college became an authorised IC3 centre and was entrusted by Pearson Edexcel BTEC to deliver IT programs from 2010 onwards.

LCB opened the LCB New Annex Building in August 2023 which focuses on having fully equipped practical kitchens and patisserie kitchen, a function room ideal for events and large lecture halls with interactive technology.

=== Ranking ===
According to Classbase, Laksamana College of Business is consistently listed in the top 10 universities and colleges in Brunei Darussalam. Currently, it is ranked as the leading (1st) among private institutions, tenth among public and private institutions, 4,065th among Asia universities and ranked as 13,642 among universities available worldwide.

== Campus ==
=== Background ===
LCB was originally a two-floors campus located at the AR Hotel Services Apartment, Plaza Abdul Razak, Jalan Laksamana in the heart of Bandar Seri Begawan.

By 19 August 2009, the college made expansion of an additional floor (known as third Floor). Recently, the college also expanded its premise of having another floor (known as second Floor) on 18 September 2013. By 19 August 2009, the college made expansion of an additional floor (known as 3rd Floor). Recently, the college also expanded its premise of having another floor (known as 2nd Floor) on 18 September 2013.

== Academic Pathways & Programmes ==
LCB’s academic pathways include qualifications and programmes delivered in partnership with internationally recognised institutions including University of Essex, Kensington College of Business, Pearson BTEC and City & Guilds London.

=== Academic faculties ===
The Laksamana College of Business main faculties are:

- Business
- Information Technology (IT) and Computing
- Hospitality
- Travel & Tourism
- Culinary Arts
- Law

=== Programmes ===
Main routes available in Laksamana College of Business are

- Pearson BTEC International Level 2 Certificate, Level 3 Diploma and Level 5 Higher National Diploma.
- City and Guilds, London Level 2 Diploma and Level 3 Advanced Diploma in Culinary Arts
- UFC (University Foundation Course), Foundation in Law, Foundation in IT, awarded by Kensington College of Business (KCB) and delivered by Laksamana College of Business.
- Undergraduate programmes available are LLB Law, Bachelor of Arts Degree in Accounting & Finance, Business Management, Marketing and International Tourism Management and Bachelor of Science Degree in Computer Science awarded by University of Essex.
- Master of Business Management (MBM) awarded by University of Essex.

== Notable alumni ==
- Nazhan Zulkifle, footballer for Kasuka FC
- Hirzi Zulfaqar Mahzan, footballer for Kota Ranger FC
- Hosea Wong, martial artist for Brunei
- Syafiq Abdillah, singer
