= Syafiq Abdillah =

Bruneian singer and actor

- Born: 4 November 1999 (age 26); Bandar Seri Begawan, Brunei
- Education: Laksamana College of Business
- Occupations: Singer; actor
- Years active: 2019–present
- Musical career
- Genres: Jazz
- Instruments: Vocals; guitar
- Label: WebTVAsia
- Website: Official channel

Muhammad Syafiq Abdillah bin Soony (born 4 November 1999) or commonly known by his stage name Syafiq Abdillah, is a singer from Brunei who took part in the 2022 singing reality show, Big Stage Season 4. His music tends to be more jazz-oriented.

== Career ==
Although Syafiq had always sung, he didn't begin performing in public until 2015. A Bruneian DJ named DJ Daffy recognized his talent and began presenting him to WebTVAsia as his record label. In 2018, Syafiq had the chance to perform for the Bruneian royal family, which included Prince Mateen. Musicians Bruno Mars, Ed Sheeran, Afgan, and Tulus piqued his curiosity. In 2019, he participated in the ASEAN+3 song contest.

Together with ten other young singers from Malaysia and one from Indonesia, Syafiq took part in season four of the reality television program Big Stage 2022 in Malaysia. His name was later revealed as one of the eliminated performers at the event, after performing the original song "Jeritan Batinku" by Azlan & the Typewriter was performed by him. Once he appeared in the competition, his name began to surface in Malaysia despite not making it to the finals.

Soon after making his debut in March 2022 with the single "Kekal," Syafiq unveiled "Suara Hidup." The song "Suara Hidup" was not written by him, unlike "Kekal". It was initially composed in 2020, and that same year it was heard in its initial demo form. Only the chorus had been written at that point, and Pique and Navigator hadn't finished the song until the previous year. Additionally, "Suara Hidup" is a collaborative effort between 1212 and Universal Music Malaysia.

== Personal life ==
=== Family ===
Coming from a creative family, Syafiq decided to follow his late grandmother's goal of becoming a singer. His grandmother is a fan of the renowned performer Datuk Jamal Abdillah, which is why he was given the name Abdillah.

=== Education ===
Syafiq previously attended Bandar Seri Begawan's Laksamana College of Business.

== Discography ==
Year	Name	Album	Notes
2019	"Sakit"	Single non-album	Music composed by Candy Rose
2022	"Kekal"	Single non-album	
2022	"Suara Hidup"	Single non-album	Music composed by Pique and Navigator
