= Speaker of the Legislative Council of Brunei =

Presiding officer of the Bruneian legislative council

Speaker of the Legislative Council
- Yang Di-Pertua Majlis Mesyuarat Negara
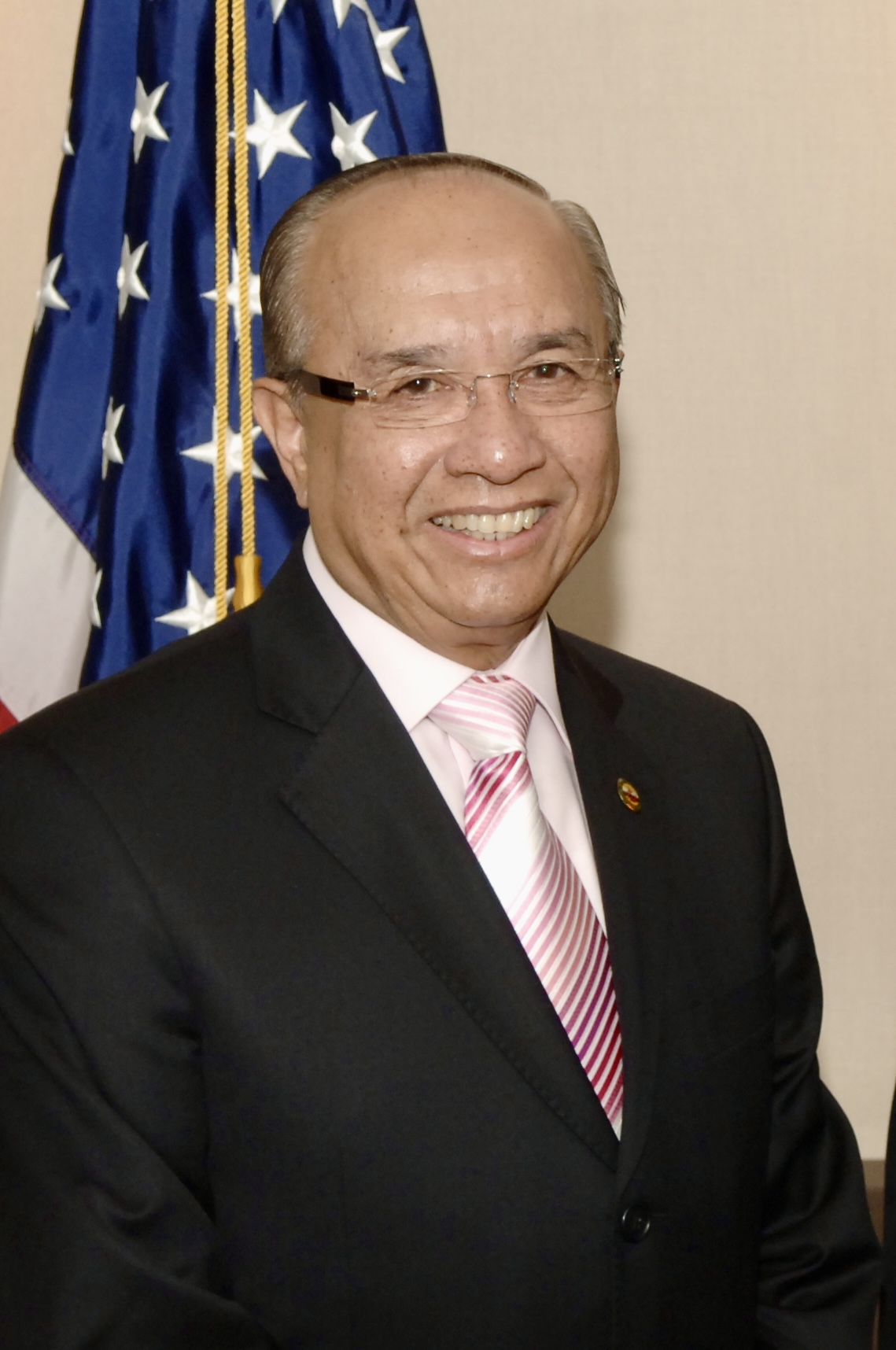
- Incumbent; Abdul Rahman Taib since 11 February 2015
- Legislative Council
- Style: The Honourable (Malay: Yang Berhormat)
- Type: Speaker
- Reports to: Legislative Council
- Seat: Dewan Majlis, Bandar Seri Begawan, Brunei
- Appointer: Hassanal Bolkiah as Sultan of Brunei
- Term length: At His Majesty's pleasure
- Constituting instrument: Constitution of Brunei
- Inaugural holder: Pengiran Abu Bakar
- Formation: 29 November 1959
- Website: Legislative Council of Brunei

The Speaker of the Legislative Council of Brunei (Malay: Yang Di-Pertua Majlis Mesyuarat Negara) is a pivotal figure in the governance process, responsible for managing the proceedings and voting within the council, ensuring transparency in legislative decisions. Appointed by the Head of State, the Speaker ranks fourth in the state hierarchy and does not assume the role of interim head of state during transitions. This position is vital for maintaining democratic principles and accountability within Brunei's legislative framework.

== Functions ==
The Speaker of the Legislative Council in Brunei plays a crucial role in managing the council's proceedings and voting process. When a question is posed to the council, the Speaker collects the votes by calling for "Ayes" and "Noes." If no member requests a division, the Speaker declares the result based on the voices heard. However, if a division is called, each member must verbally cast their vote, and the Speaker or chairman announces the results. In the event of a tie, the Speaker has the authority to cast the deciding vote. The Speaker also oversees the maintenance of the council's minutes, which are recorded by the Clerk. These minutes detail all decisions and significant matters, and they are signed by the Speaker. If a member identifies inaccuracies in the minutes, they must raise these through a personal explanation, submitting the issue to the Speaker for resolution. Additionally, any member wishing to ask a question must submit it in writing to the Clerk at least seven days in advance unless special approval is granted by the Speaker for shorter notice.

== Appointments ==
The speaker of the Legislative Council is appointed by the head of state, who has the authority to designate the speaker, even when selected from outside the parliament. In the state hierarchy, the Speaker ranks fourth, following the Sultan, the crown prince (who is the Senior Minister at the Prime Minister's Office), and the special advisor to His Majesty the Sultan. Unlike in other countries, the Speaker does not serve as the interim head of state in the event of the Sultan's death or incapacity. The Speaker's mandate continues between legislative terms, and while the term of the Speaker differs from that of the house, there is no fixed election date or term length established. The Sultan appoints the Speaker through an official Instrument under the Seal of Brunei Darussalam, and while the Speaker may be chosen from among the council members, if no Speaker is appointed or the position is vacant, references to the Speaker in the Constitution are interpreted as references to the prime minister. The Speaker serves at His Majesty's pleasure for a period specified in the appointment and can resign by addressing a letter to the Sultan. If the Speaker is appointed from among the council members, they must vacate the office if they cease to be a member. The Speaker is required to attend and preside over all Legislative Council meetings, and in their absence, another member, either appointed by the Speaker or, if none is appointed, the highest-ranking member present, will preside.

== List of speakers ==
No.	Portrait	Name	Took office	Left office	Time in office	Monarch	Ref
1		Pengiran Paduka Tuan; Pengiran Abu Bakar ڤڠيرن ابو بکر (1907–1974)	29 September 1959	1962	2–3 years	Omar Ali Saifuddien III	
2		Pengiran Pekerma Setia Diraja Sahibul Bandar; Pengiran Muhammad Ali ڤڠيرن محمد علي (1916–2005)	March 1962	September 1962	5–6 months	Omar Ali Saifuddien III	
Council suspended (1962–1963) (Note: The Sultan imposed a State of Emergency and suspended the Legislative and Executive Councils during the 1962 Brunei revolt. Only in July 1963 did the Sultan abolish the State of Emergency and restore both councils. The Sultan nominated all of the members of the Executive and Legislative Councils upon their reestablishment; none of them were elected.)
3		Pehin Datu Perdana Manteri; Dato Laila Utama; Ibrahim Mohammad Jahfar ابراهيم محمد جهفر (1902–1971)	June 1963	30 January 1965	1 year	Omar Ali Saifuddien III	
Council dissolved (1963) (Note: In June 1963, he was appointed Speaker of the legislative council, which was then dissolved on 30 January 1965. When the Legislative Council was reconvened on 31 January 1965, he was reappointed Speaker. After suspending legislative elections, the Sultan established a new Legislative Council in 1970, composed entirely of his nominees, and replaced the 1965 council on 12 April 1970 after it completed its five-year term.)
(3)		Pehin Datu Perdana Manteri; Dato Laila Utama; Ibrahim Mohammad Jahfar ابراهيم محمد جهفر (1902–1971)	31 January 1965	19 February 1971	6 years, 19 days	Omar Ali Saifuddien III	
4		Pengiran Pemancha Sahibul Rae' Wal Mashuarah; Pengiran Anak Mohamed Alam ڤڠيرن انق محمد عالم (1918–1982)	14 July 1971	30 November 1974	3 years, 139 days	Hassanal Bolkiah	
5		Pengiran Jaya Negara; Pengiran Abu Bakar ڤڠيرن ابو بكر (1906–1985)	1 December 1974	1981	6–7 years (Note: The Sultan of Brunei approved the dissolution of the elected council on 15 December 1977, consented to reorganise and re-elect several former members, and formally reconvened the new council on 22 December 1977.)	Hassanal Bolkiah	
6		Pengiran Indera Mahkota; Pengiran Anak Kemaluddin ڤڠيرن انق کمال الدين (1929–2012)	15 December 1981	14 February 1984	2 years, 65 days	Hassanal Bolkiah	
Council dissolved (1984–2004) (Note: Sultan Hassanal Bolkiah dissolved the council on 28 December 1983, just after its inaugural meeting, and disbanded it again on 13 February 1984. After a 21-year hiatus, the Sultan reconvened the council on 25 September 2004 to approve constitutional reforms, later disbanding it in 2005 and reestablishing it under the amended 1959 Constitution.)
(6)		Pengiran Indera Mahkota; Pengiran Anak Kemaluddin ڤڠيرن انق کمال الدين (1929–2012)	25 September 2004	9 February 2011	6 years, 137 days	Hassanal Bolkiah	
7		Pehin Orang Kaya Laila Setia Bakti Di-Raja; Dato Laila Utama; Isa Ibrahim عيسى ابراهيم (b.1935)	10 February 2011	11 February 2015	4 years, 1 day	Hassanal Bolkiah	
8		Pehin Orang Kaya Seri Lela; Dato Seri Setia; Abdul Rahman Taib عبدالرحمن طائب (b.1942)	11 February 2015	Incumbent	11 years, 209 days	Hassanal Bolkiah	
