= 1965 Bruneian general election =

General elections were held for the first time in Brunei on 20 March 1965. To date, they are the last elections held in the country.

The majority of the 36 candidates contesting the election were independents, some of which were former members of the banned Brunei People's Party (PRB).

== Background ==
The Legislative Council was established by the 1959 constitution. It originally consisted of 17 appointed members and 16 members elected by members of district councils. In December 1963 Sultan Omar Ali Saifuddien III announced that general elections would be held within the next two years. Following discussions with the British government, it was agreed that direct elections would be held to a reconstituted Council in 1965, with 10 elected members, five appointed members and six ex officio members.

== Results ==
Three of the elected councillors – Yusof Limbang, Zainal Abidin Puteh and Abdul Wahab Safar – were former BRP members. Of the 19,144 registered voters, around 80% participated in the elections.

== Aftermath ==
Following the elections a Council of Ministers was established.
