= Adnan Buntar =

Bruneian diplomat

Dato Paduka Adnan Buntar DPMB
- عدنان بونتر
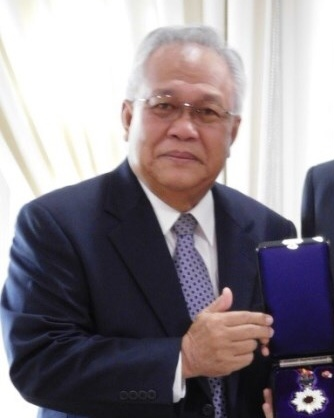
- Adnan in 2018

Ambassador of Brunei to Japan
- In office 14 November 2005 – October 2008
- Preceded by: Nor Jeludin
- Succeeded by: Alias Serbini

Ambassador of Brunei to Germany
- In office 13 September 2002 – 2004
- Preceded by: Mahadi Wasli
- Succeeded by: Ali Hassan

High Commissioner of Brunei to India
- In office 8 August 1994 – 1997
- Succeeded by: Abdul Mokti Daud

Personal details
- Born: Brunei
- Spouse: Pengiran Yura Alaiti
- Relations: Pengiran Yusuf (father-in-law)
- Education: Royal Holloway College (BSc)
- Occupation: Diplomat

Mohd Adnan bin Buntar is a Brunei diplomat who became the high commissioner to India from 1994 to 1997, and ambassador to Japan from 2005 to 2008. He has held other major titles such as the Deputy Permanent Secretary of the Ministry of Foreign Affairs and Trade (MOFAT), and former chairman of the Brunei Japan Friendship Association.

== Career ==
Mohd Adnan obtained his early education at the Anthony Abell College, Seria in 1973. He later attended the Royal Holloway College for his Bachelor of Science in Zoology.

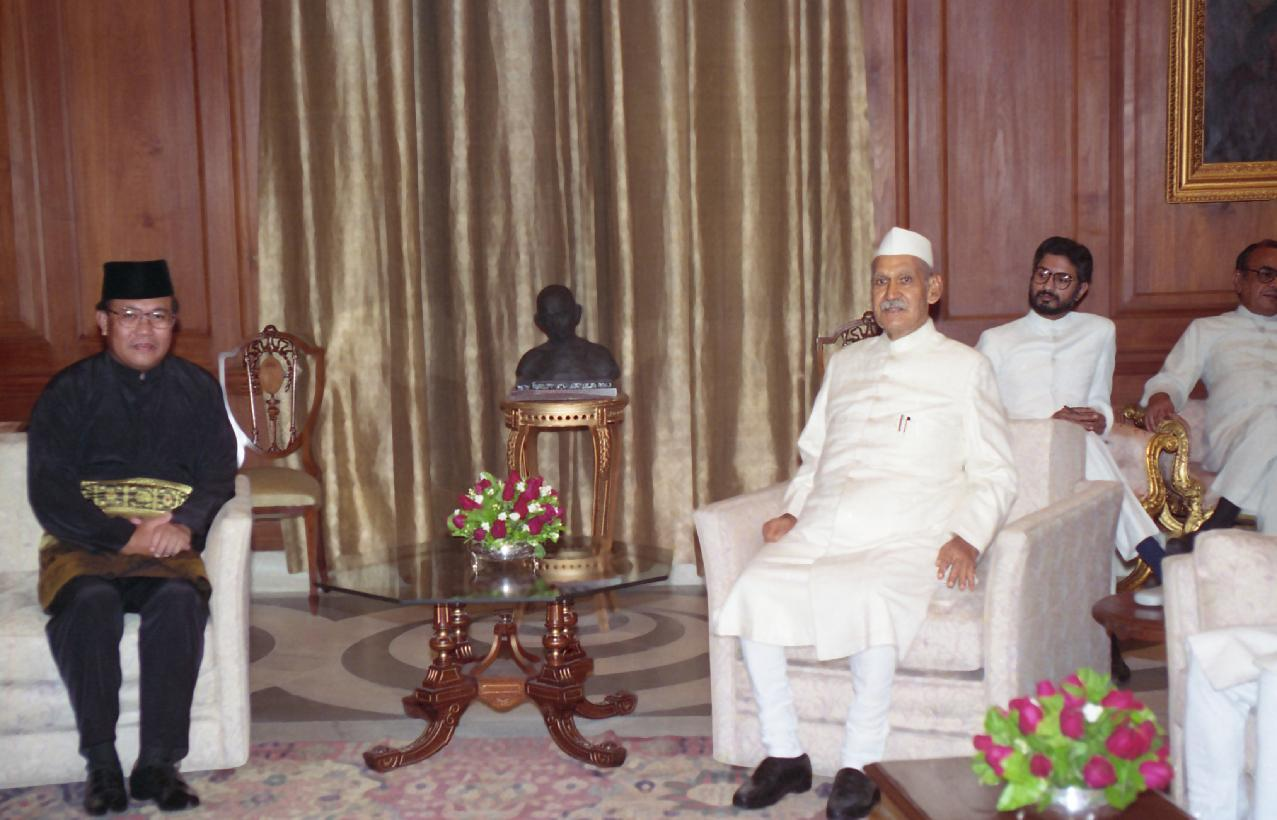
Adnan and President Shankar Dayal Sharma in 1994

In 1993, he was the Director-General, of ASEAN-Brunei Darussalam. On 8 August 1994, at Rashtrapati Bhavan in New Delhi, Adnan, the High Commissioner-Designate of Brunei to India, presented his credentials to Shankar Dayal Sharma. He was among the Brune delegation at the 50th anniversary of the United Nations Industrial Development Organization.

On 13 September 2002, Adnan, the newly appointed ambassador to Germany, presented his letters of credentials to Annemarie Huber-Hotz.

At the Istana Nurul Iman on 11 August 2005, Sultan Hassanal Bolkiah gave Adnan letters of credentials. During his tenure as Ambassador from 2005 to 2008, he played a pivotal role in fostering friendship between Brunei Darussalam and Japan. 2006 saw Princess Masna, the MOFAT's Ambassador-at-Large, visit Japan, while 2007 saw the Sultan. In 2005, Adnan established a communication channel between Universiti Brunei Darussalam and Kagawa University, which helped the two institutions to sign a Memorandum of Understanding in 2006.

In his last year as ambassador, he saw the realisation of the economic alliance between Brunei and Japan. In the same year, Japan and Brunei inked an agreement to prohibit double taxation and combat fiscal evasion with regard to income taxes. This agreement laid the groundwork for future efforts to advance economic ties between the two nations.

After retirement, he remained actively involved in promoting bilateral ties through the Brunei Japan Friendship Association (BJFA), where he currently serves as Adviser I.

== Personal life ==
Adnan is married to Pengiran Datin Hajah Yura Alaiti, and Pengiran Yusuf is his father-in-law.

== Honours ==
The 2018 Spring Imperial Decorations awardees have been revealed by the Japanese government, and Adnan has been recognised for his noteworthy efforts to fostering goodwill and understanding between Brunei and Japan. He's awarded the Order of the Rising Sun 2nd Class for his achievements. He has earned the following honours;

National

- Order of Seri Paduka Mahkota Brunei Second Class (DPMB) – Dato Paduka

Foreign

- Japan:
  - Order of the Rising Sun Second Class (8 May 2018)
  - Honorary Doctorate from the Kagawa University (20 October 2009)

Diplomatic posts
Preceded by Nor Jeludin	Ambassador of Brunei to Japan; 14 November 2005 – October 2008	Succeeded by Alias Serbini
Preceded by Mahadi Wasli	Ambassador of Brunei to Germany; 13 September 2002 – 2004	Succeeded by Ali Hassan
Preceded by –	High Commissioner of Brunei to India; 8 August 1994 – 1997	Succeeded by Abdul Mokti Daud
