= Pengiran Muhammad Yusuf =

Bruneian civil servant and diplomat (1923–2016)

Yang Amat Mulia Pengiran Setia Negara Pengiran Muhammad Yusuf DK SPMB DSNB CBE POAS PHBS PBLI PJK PKL
- ڤڠيرن محمد يوسف
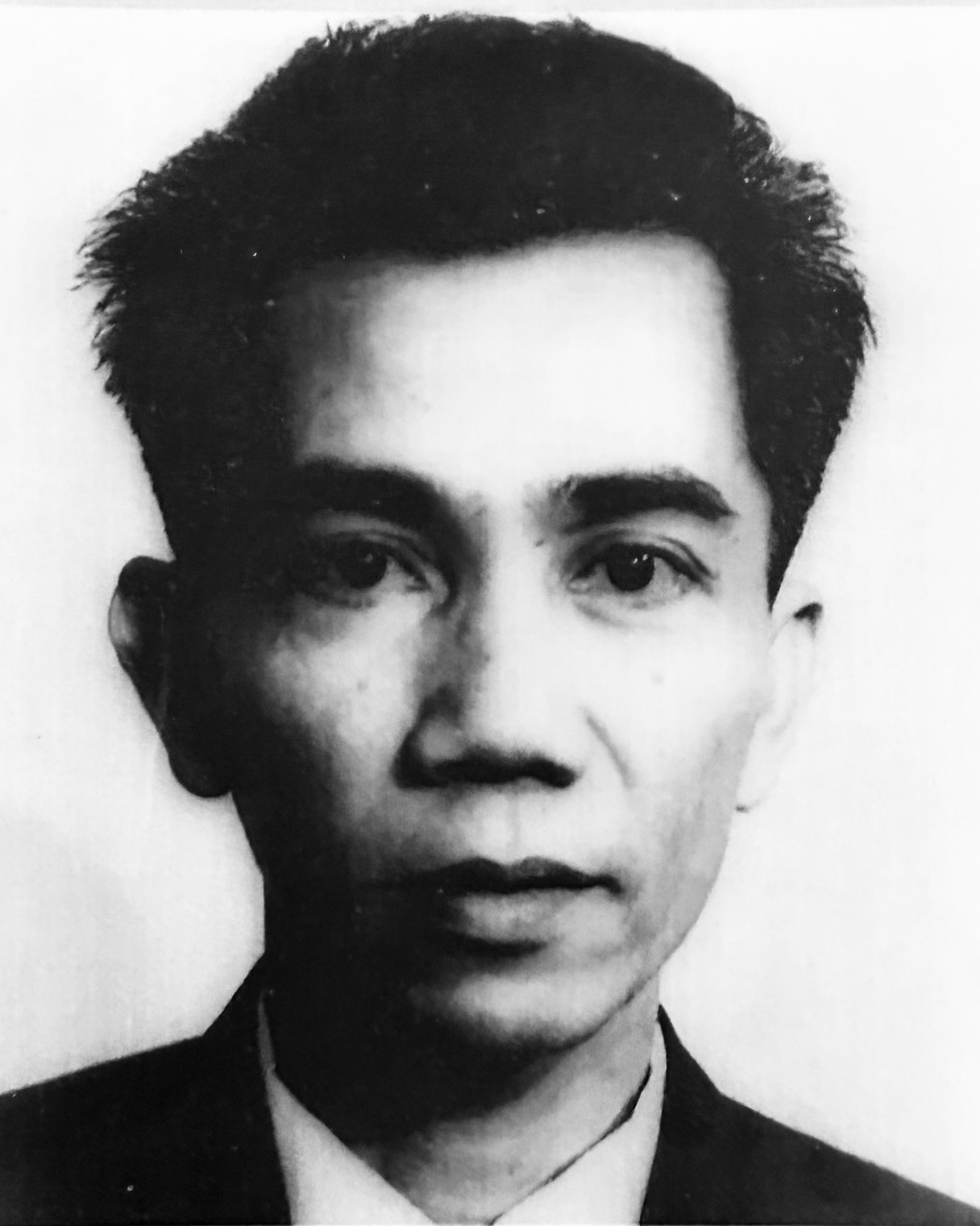
- Pengiran Muhammad Yusuf, c. 1959

Member of the Legislative Council
- In office 1 June 2011 – 11 April 2016
- In office 6 September 2004 – 15 March 2011

3rd Menteri Besar of Brunei
- In office 4 November 1968 – December 1973
- Monarch: Hassanal Bolkiah
- Deputy: Isa Ibrahim
- Preceded by: Marsal Maun
- Succeeded by: Pengiran Abdul Momin

3rd State Secretary of Brunei
- In office 18 January 1964 – December 1966
- Monarch: Omar Ali Saifuddien III
- Deputy: Taib Besar
- Preceded by: Raja Azam
- Succeeded by: Taib Besar (Acting)
Diplomatic positions
Ambassador of Brunei to Japan
In office 26 December 2001 – 2002
Preceded by	Malai Ahmad Murad
Succeeded by	Nor Jeludin
High Commissioner of Brunei to Malaysia
In office 17 November 1995 – 2001
Preceded by	Pengiran Jaya
Succeeded by	Amin Abdul Rahim

Personal details
- Born: 2 May 1923 Kampong Kandang, Tutong, Brunei
- Died: 11 April 2016 (aged 92) Kampong Sengkarai, Tutong, Brunei
- Resting place: Sengkarai Muslim Cemetery, Tutong, Brunei
- Party: BARIP (1946)
- Spouse: Salmah Yussof
- Relatives: Pengiran Shariffuddin (nephew); Adnan Buntar (son-in-law)
- Education: Hiroshima University of Arts and Sciences; Sultan Idris Teachers' College
- Occupation: Civil servant; diplomat; educator; poet
- Awards: SEA Write Award

Pengiran Muhammad Yusuf bin Pengiran Haji Abdul Rahim (Note: The former spelling of his given name is "Pengiran Mohamed Yusof" rather than "Pengiran Muhammad Yusuf.") (2 May 1923 – 11 April 2016), pen name Yura Halim, was a Bruneian civil servant, diplomat, educator and noble poet. He served as Brunei's state secretary from 1964 to 1967 before becoming the third menteri besar (chief minister) from 1968 to 1972. He later held prominent diplomatic roles as Brunei's high commissioner to Malaysia from 1995 to 2001 and ambassador to Japan from 2001 to 2002. Additionally, he was appointed a member of the Legislative Council of Brunei (LegCo) in 2011, serving in the position until his passing in 2016.

He was one of the "Three M's" or "Three Musketeers," (Note: Not to be confused with another set of "Three Musketeers," Sulaiman Damit, Mohammad Daud, and Awangku Ibnu Basit earned the nickname after being selected for officer cadet training at the Federation Military College in Malaya in 1960.) feared by the British government, alongside Marsal Maun and Pengiran Muhammad Ali. As a prominent member of the Brunei Malay Teachers Association (PGGMB), Pengiran Muhammad Yusuf, along with figures like Jamil Al-Sufri, played a pivotal role in opposing British colonial influence in Brunei during the early 1950s. A hibakusha, he was widely recognised for his contributions to Brunei's governance, literature, and diplomacy. Notably, he became the first Bruneian to receive an honorary doctorate from Hiroshima University and wrote the lyrics to the national anthem Allah Peliharakan Sultan.

== Early life and education ==
Pengiran Muhammad Yusuf was born in Kampong Kandang in Tutong District on 2 May 1923. He was educated at a Malay school in Tutong town and trained at Sultan Idris Training College (SITC) in 1940, but his studies were interrupted by the Japanese invasion in late 1941. He returned to Brunei in December 1942 and attended a Japanese language class in Brunei Town and later in Kuching. Towards the end of 1943, he was selected, along with a few students from the Borneo territories, to study in Japan. He enrolled in a language course at the Kokusai Gakuyukai International Institute in Tokyo and later attended Hiroshima University of Literature and Science in 1945 to study language and education.

Pengiran Muhammad Yusuf, along with other Malay-educated figures like Salleh Masri and Jamil Al-Sufri, was at the forefront of agitation in Brunei following the Japanese occupation. Their early influences may have stemmed from their training at institutions such as the SITC in British Malaya. Aged 18, he was among the Brunei students trained by the Japanese during World War II and was selected for the Nanpō Tokubetsu Ryūgaksei program. He trained in Japan, attending Hiroshima University, and was living in Hiroshima during the atomic bombing, which caused him to suffer radiation poisoning. He returned to Brunei in March 1946 and continued his efforts in Brunei's post-war political developments.

== Career ==
=== Early career ===
Pengiran Muhammad Yusuf began his career as a teacher at Bukit Bendera Malay School, Tutong on 1 January 1939. He was later elected vice president of Barisan Pemuda (BARIP) when it was formed on 12 April 1946. BARIP aimed to achieve Brunei's independence and promote the social and economic advancement of the Malay community, though it was influenced by Indonesian nationalism but did not prioritise independence for Brunei. Instead, the group focused on uniting young Bruneians to protect local rights against immigrants and advocated for the restoration of the British Residency to safeguard Malay interests, leading to the return to civil government in July 1946. He played a key role in bringing the issue of the arch to Sultan Ahmad Tajuddin's attention. When the British Resident ordered the protest slogan to be changed, he led BARIP in refusing to comply, threatening to bring down the arch. The sultan intervened, overruled the British Resident's order, and sided with BARIP, which he was not surprised by, as he knew the sultan shared concerns about rising Chinese influence in Brunei.

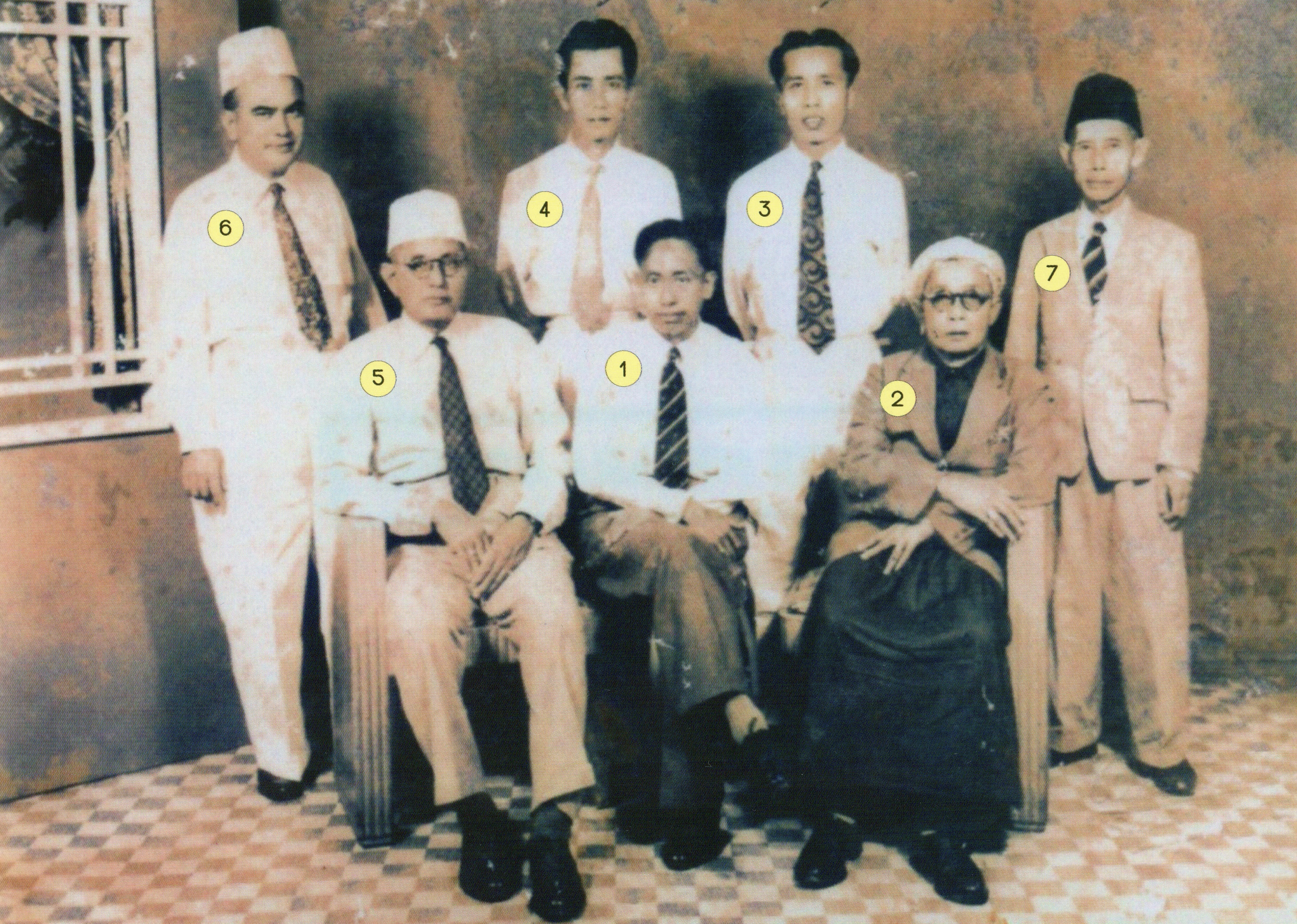
Pengiran Muhammad Yusuf (no. 4) in a group photograph with the other six members of the Tujuh Serangkai

In 1947, Pengiran Muhammad Yusuf wrote the lyrics for Allah Peliharakan Sultan for BARIP, which would later be adopted as Brunei's national anthem. Later that year, as the deputy president of BARIP, he was sent back to Malaya to resume his teacher training, which had been interrupted by the war. Upon his return in 1950, he was posted to Temburong District until 1954. His transfer, along with those of other leaders, weakened BARIP, leading to its decline. Pengiran Muhammad Yusuf believed the sultan, despite the British Resident's advice, wanted the process of gauging public opinion on constitutional proposals to be a Bruneian matter. Consequently, he was appointed secretary to the Tujuh Serangkai, a constitutional advisory committee, in 1953. The public's response to the Sultan Omar Ali Saifuddien III's proposal was overwhelming, with young educated Bruneians, especially teachers, engaging in discussions about democracy and independence. By late 1953, the committee had completed its tour of Brunei and, in early 1954, was tasked with studying Malaya's constitutions and administrative procedures. As secretary, Pengiran Muhammad Yusuf compiled a 50-page report from the visit to the four districts, which was presented to Sultan Omar Ali Saifuddien III in 1954.

=== State information officer ===
After transferring to the Information Department in 1954, Pengiran Muhammad Yusuf was sent to South Devon Technical College in Torquay, United Kingdom, to study public and social administration, where he remained until 1957. During this time, he was appointed to a committee investigating housing allocations for government officers in December 1956. Upon his return, he rejoined the Information Department and was later elected as the country's first information officer on 1 January 1957. Later that year, he was appointed as an unofficial member of the State Council, a role he held until the enactment of the new constitution. That same year, he accompanied the sultan to London for key constitutional discussions with the Colonial Office. During these discussions, he strongly supported the sultan’s call for appointing a chief minister, state secretary, and state financial officer to align with or follow the constitution’s implementation. He argued that the change had been delayed since 1953 and reflected the people's wishes.

In February 1958, Pengiran Muhammad Yusuf, alongside Pengiran Ali and Marsal, was appointed to review the draft Agreement between Brunei and the United Kingdom and propose a new version after the State Council insisted on discussing it without the Anthony Abell present. Later, in May 1958, as the state information officer, Pengiran Muhammad Yusuf was identified by Abell as one of three key figures, alongside Pengiran Ali and Marsal, who were vocal in the State Council. E. R. Bevington noted that they often acted as spokesmen for the sultan and played a significant role in advocating for amendments to both the constitution enactment and the draft agreement.

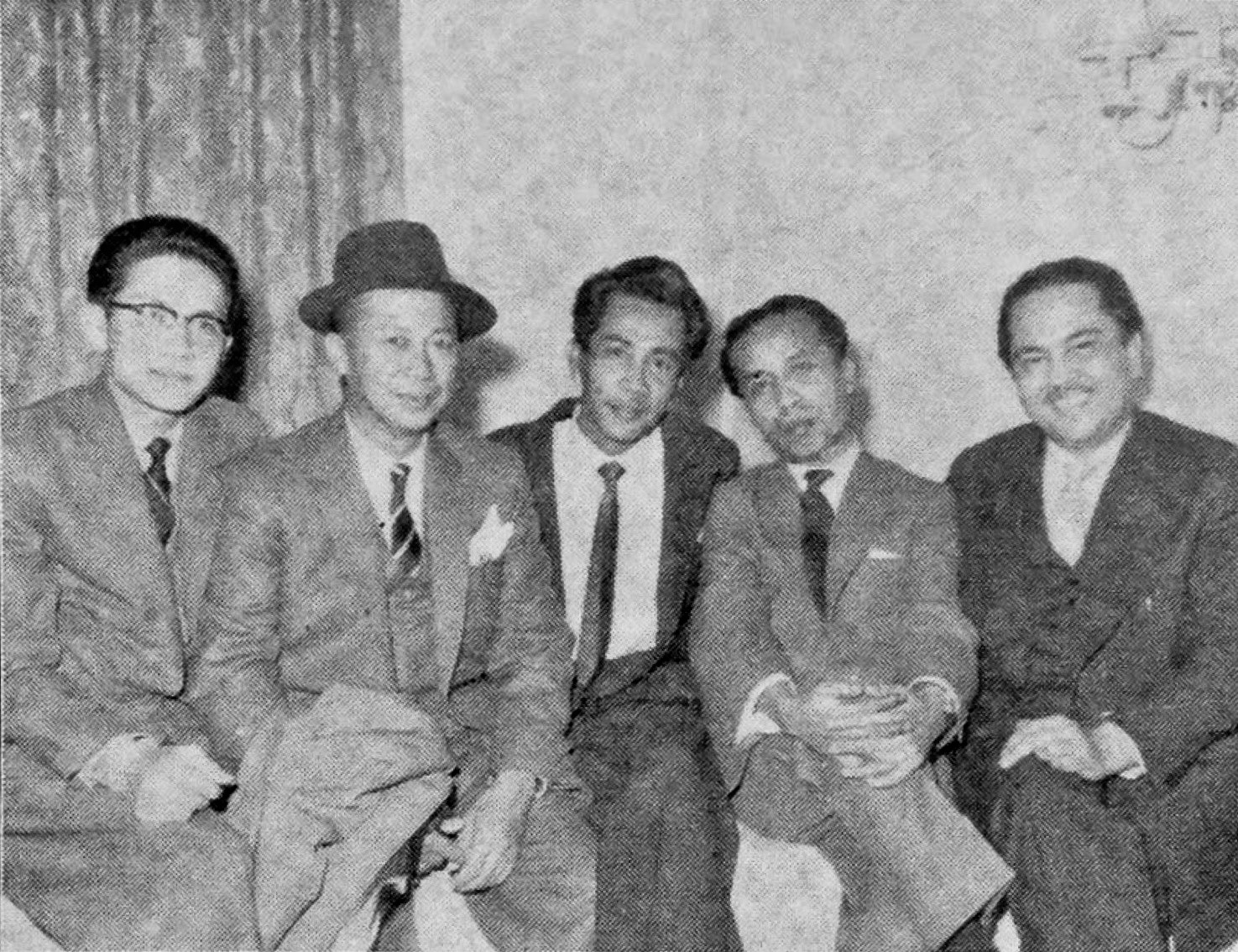
From left to right: Isa Ibrahim, Marsal, Pengiran Muhammad Yusuf, Pengiran Ali, and Zaini Ahmad, at Grosvenor House Hotel in April 1959

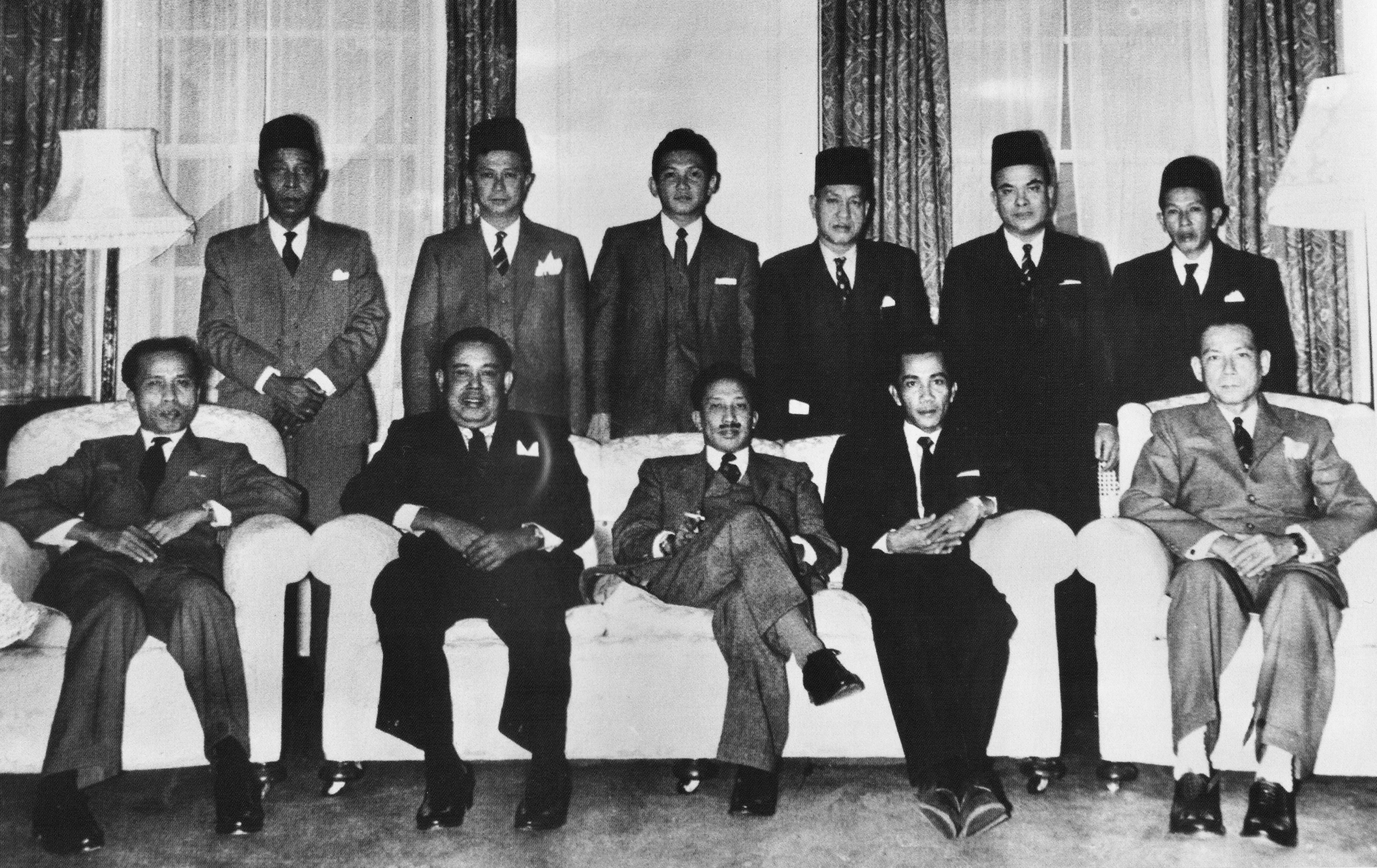
Pengiran Muhammad Yusuf (seated second from the right) with the 1959 constitutional delegation in London

Pengiran Muhammad Yusuf was a member of Brunei's delegation to the 1959 constitutional negotiations in London, which included all Malay State Council members. Advised by two lawyers, the delegation discussed key issues such as the transfer of the British Resident's powers, nationality, LegCo qualifications, defence, and the high commissioner's reserve powers. On 23 March, at the London Conference, he participated in six plenary sessions chaired by the state secretary. He was involved in discussions, alongside Brunei's legal advisers, on key constitutional matters, including Brunei’s administrative separation from Sarawak.

In October 1959, Pengiran Muhammad Yusuf represented Brunei at a youth conference in Japan, where a key decision was made to advocate for the use of atomic energy for global peace and prosperity, not for destruction. He emphasised the importance of youth worldwide learning science and adapting to the Atomic Age, urging them to prepare not only as national leaders but also as global leaders who champion peace and prosperity. The conference, attended by representatives from 25 countries, was officially opened by Japan's education minister. Later, he witnessed the granting and signing of Brunei's constitution at the Lapau on 29 September 1959. Following the signing, he was appointed as a member of both the LegCo and Executive Council.

Pengiran Muhammad Yusuf was confirmed as the state information officer in December 1960 after the LegCo's unofficial members walked out in protest of their ideas being rejected, following growing hostilities between the locals and the Malayan contingent over the perceived influence of Malayan officers. In July 1961, he was promoted to deputy state secretary, succeeding Marsal. The high commissioner noted that his appointment, along with Marsal's, would have previously been met with concern due to their nationalist leanings and close ties with the Partai Rakyat Brunei (PRB). Pengiran Muhammad Yusuf, alongside Marsal, was praised for addressing a significant backlog of administrative tasks in Brunei, clearing around 600 files in the State Secretary's Office within four months of their appointments. His promotion in August 1961, which included roles as deputy state secretary and director of broadcasting and information, reinforced his alliance with the sultan and marked a shift towards Bruneian officers in senior government positions, reducing reliance on Malayan officials.

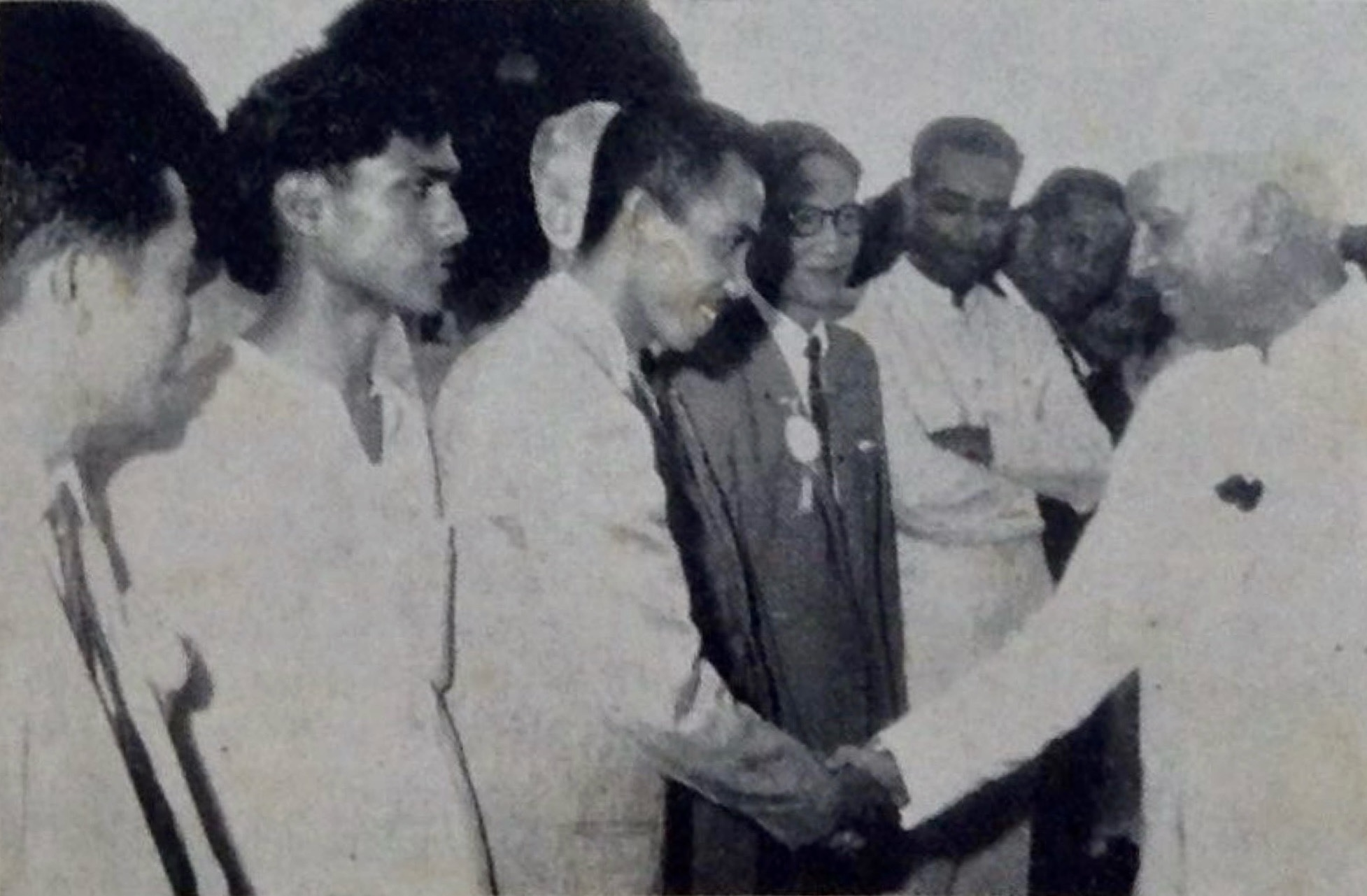
Pengiran Muhammad Yusuf (third from the left) greeting President Jawaharlal Nehru in October 1961

In that same month, George Douglas-Hamilton visited Brunei to discuss the Malaysia Plan with the sultan but failed to secure his commitment. Feeling betrayed by Tunku Abdul Rahman, who had threatened to withdraw officers from Brunei, the sultan turned to his traditional advisers—Marsal, Pengiran Ali, and Pengiran Muhammad Yusuf—who favoured an isolationist approach. The sultan refused to discuss the Malaysia Plan, citing constitutional and treaty restrictions. However, in late November 1961, the sultan informed the Executive Council of his decision to welcome the Malaysia Plan, with no discussion or vote on the matter. It was believed that he had enlisted the support of Marsal, Pengiran Ali, Pengiran Muhammad Yusuf, and Abdul Aziz Zain, whom he had appointed to advise him on the issue. Pengiran Muhammad Yusuf later attended the second Malaysian Solidarity Consultative Committee (MSCC) meeting in Kuching in mid-December 1961 as an observer, where key issues like federal representation, immigration, and economic development were discussed.

At the final MSCC meeting in Singapore on 7 February 1962, the Malaysia Plan was agreed with particular protections for Borneo areas. A memorandum, signed by all delegates including the Brunei representatives, was submitted to the Cobbold Commission, set up by the Malayan and British governments. The Brunei delegation consisted of Pengiran Muhammad Yusuf, along with Pengiran Ali, Jamil, Lim Cheng Choo, and Abdul Aziz as the advisor. In March, while Pengiran Ali and Pengiran Muhammad Yusuf openly supported the Malaysia Plan and signed the MSCC's memorandum, Abdul Aziz informed Dennis White that Dato Marsal, Ibrahim Mohammad Jahfar was wavering in his support for the plan. Pengiran Muhammad Yusuf was involved in the Brunei government's discussions around the Malaysia proposal in April and played a key role in resolving tensions within the government, particularly between Marsal and Pengiran Ali, by mediating their rift. He was part of the group supporting Malaysia and helped influence others towards approval of the proposal.

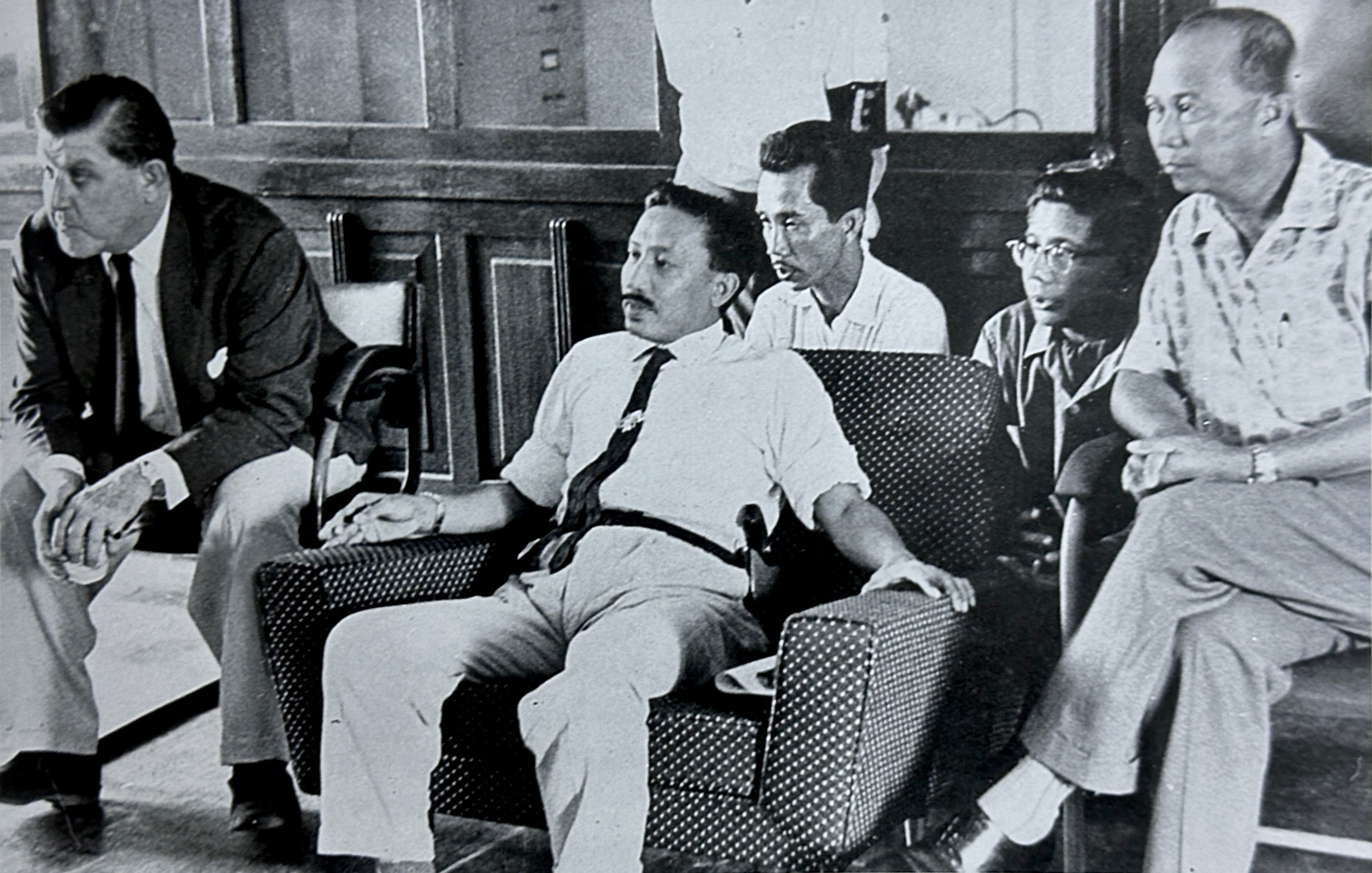
From left to right: White, the sultan, Pengiran Muhammad Yusuf, Raja Azam, and Marsal, during a press conference with foreign journalists at the State Secretary's Office building on 15 December 1962

Pengiran Muhammad Yusuf addressed public concerns on Radio Brunei in July 1962, refuting rumours that the Bruneian administration and the sultan's position would be abolished if Brunei joined Malaysia. He warned that a small group was inciting opposition against the sultan and spreading false information. On 28 July, representing the government, he responded to concerns in the Borneo Bulletin and the LegCo about a doctor shortage, denying the issue and stating that Brunei had 12 doctors, with an average of one per 7,000 people. In the same broadcast, he again warned of efforts to turn the public against the sultan, a message that appeared to have palace approval despite the police and Special Branch being unaware of it. Privately, he suggested Indonesia was behind the propaganda. His warnings were unusual, as the Brunei government typically avoided such direct communications, and they coincided with a rise in gun thefts. While there was no confirmed link to the North Kalimantan National Army (TNKU), the Borneo Bulletin noted the unusual nature of these crimes, adding to suspicions that they were linked to TNKU's preparations for the revolt.

On 25 September 1962, a Brunei delegation led by Marsal, including Pengiran Muhammad Yusuf, Pengiran Ali, Jamil, Pengiran Mohammad, and legal advisers Neil Lawson and Abdul Aziz, travelled to Kuala Lumpur for exploratory talks with the Malayan government. Their proposals included full self-government, federal responsibility for external affairs and defence, a federal guarantee of the sultan's status and Brunei’s constitution, a federal citizenship model with state-controlled immigration, representation in the Malayan government, and a financial contribution. However, they found the Malaya's terms "unacceptable." By December, Acting High Commissioner W. J. Parks noted that the Brunei government, particularly Pengiran Muhammad Yusuf, may have been aware of the TNKU activities. In July, he had warned in a radio broadcast about a small group inciting unrest against the sultan, though it appeared the government had no concrete intelligence on the TNKU at the time.

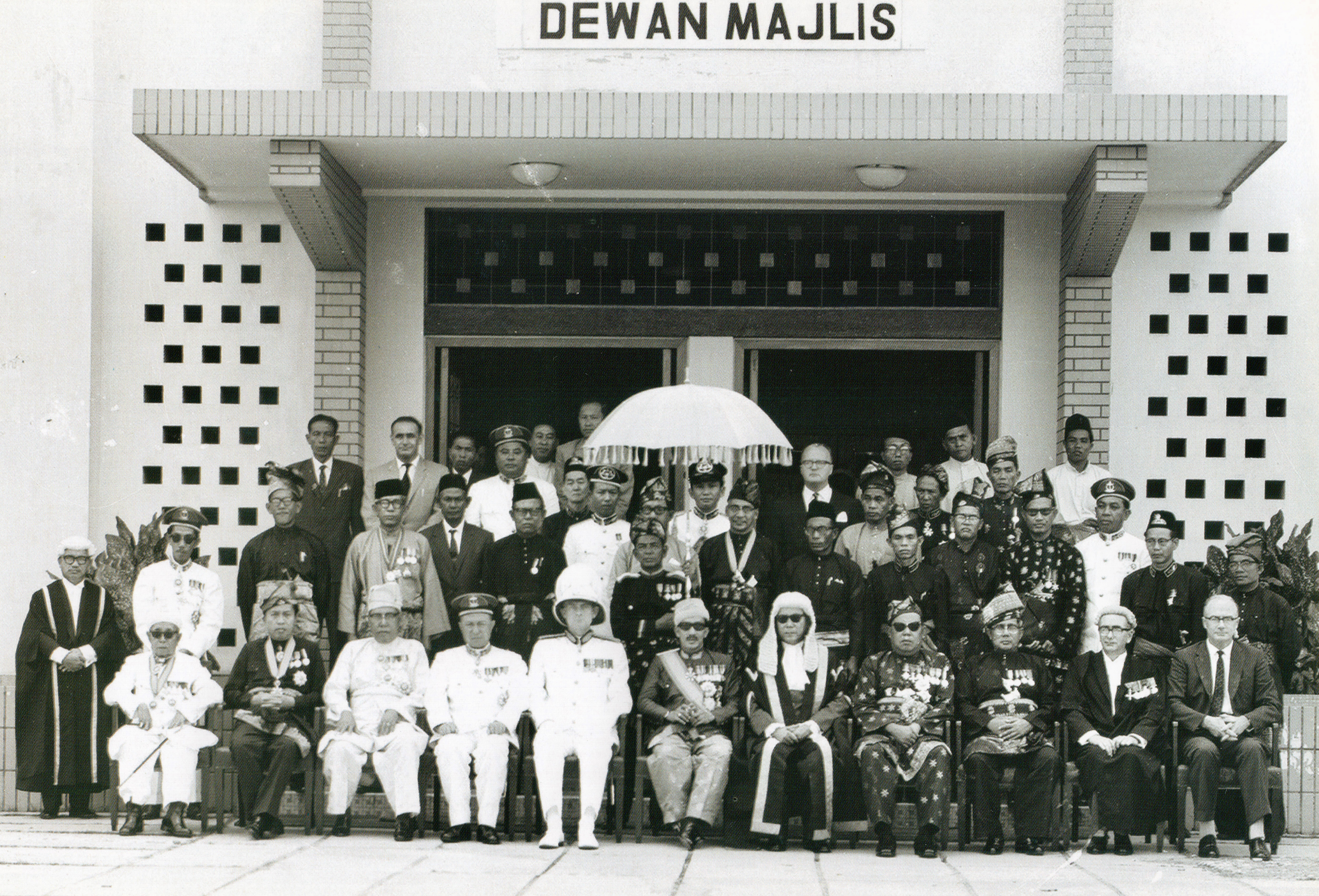
Pengiran Muhammad Yusuf (standing second from the left) with the members of the 1963 LegCo

In March 1963, the sultan sought to use detained PRB leaders to advocate for Brunei's participation in Malaysia, with White assessing their sincerity. White suggested they could help form a new political party under Pengiran Muhammad Yusuf, focusing on constitutional reform and Malaysia. He found Abdul Hapidz reliable, Tengah Hasip helpful but not a leader, and Pengiran Metussin supportive of independence first, recommending parole for the detainees to assist in the campaign. However, White's efforts to create a new political party involving PRB moderates and Pengiran Muhammad Yusuf ultimately failed. The main obstacle was the sultan's reluctance to allow political activity outside his control, especially after the rebellion. This mistrust extended to the exclusion of political party representatives from Brunei's negotiations in Kuala Lumpur over Malaysia. In December 1963, his tenure as deputy state secretary was completed.

=== State secretary of Brunei ===
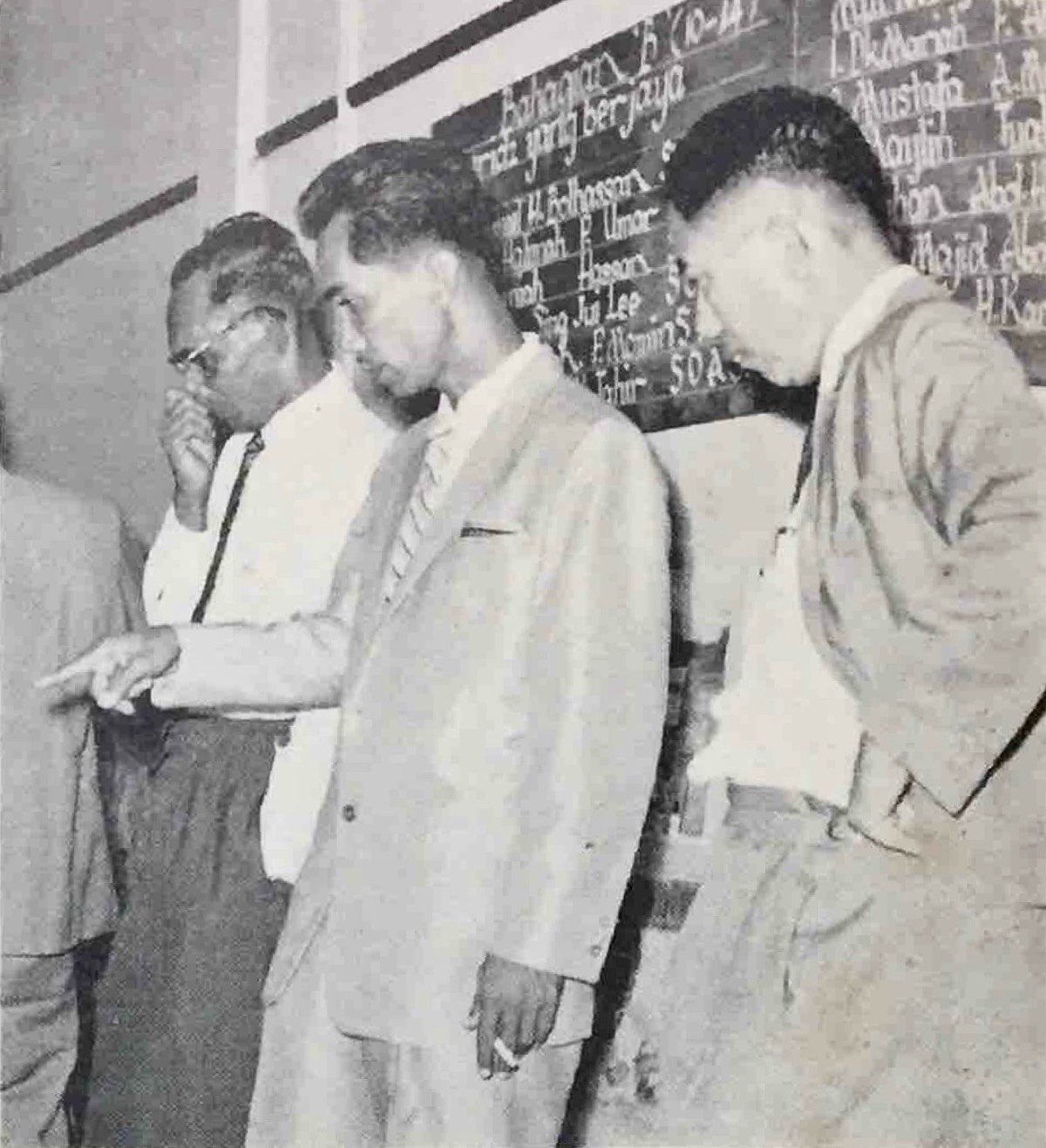
Othman Bidin (left) and Pengiran Muhammad Yusuf (centre) admiring artwork in 1964

Pengiran Muhammad Yusuf was confirmed as Brunei's state secretary on 18 January 1964, making him the country's first native Brunei Malay to occupy the role since Ibrahim. On 19 April 1965, he officiated the opening of the Tutong District Council meeting, advising its members to exercise their powers within legal and constitutional boundaries while emphasising political progress and stability as key to Brunei's future. Due to health concerns, Chief Minister Marsal took leave on 1 October, and he was appointed as acting chief minister for a period of time.

In 1966, he was involved in Brunei's efforts to claim Limbang, with the Brunei government sending letters to the British government and Malaysia regarding the issue. The British acknowledged the claim and informed Pengiran Muhammad Yusuf that Malaysia was considering the matter, but there was no follow-up. That same year, he and Pengiran Anak Mohamed Alam represented the sultan of Brunei at the coronation of Yang Di-Pertuan Agong, Tuanku Ismail Nasiruddin Shah, in Kuala Lumpur on 10 April. In December, he completed his short tenure as state secretary. On 27 March 1967, he officiated the opening of the Madrasah Building of the Religious Affairs Department in Brunei Town.

=== Chief minister of Brunei ===
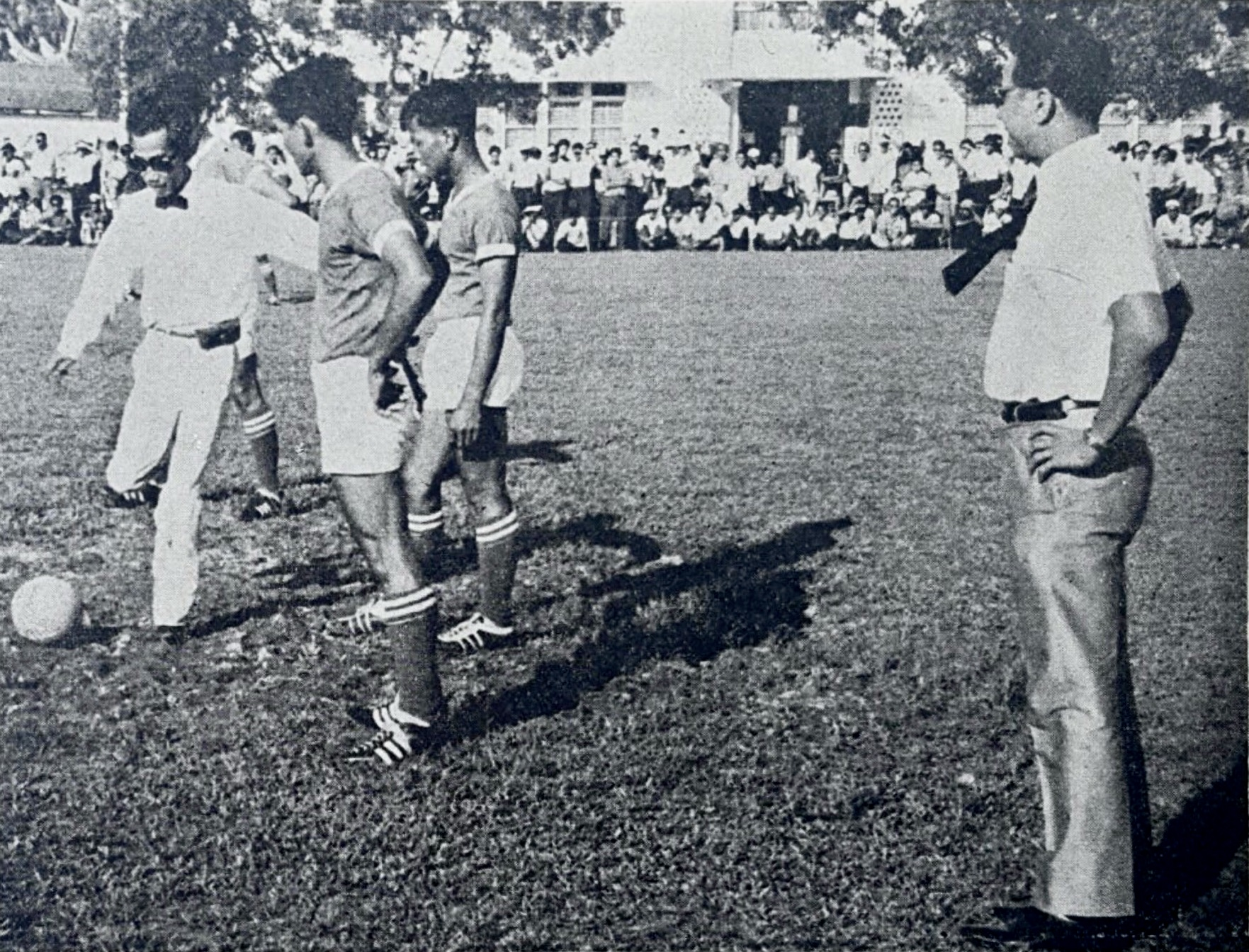
Pengiran Muhammad Yusuf (left) officiating a football tournament at Padang Besar in 1967

On 1 June 1967, with the incumbent granted another long leave by the sultan, which lasted until his retirement, Pengiran Muhammad Yusuf once again served as acting chief minister, while Taib Besar became acting state secretary. In July, he expressed his happiness at the progress of the three Borneo regions, highlighting the challenges and changes faced over 13 years. While Sarawak and Sabah joined Malaysia, Brunei chose to remain independent. He also urged citizens to develop rural land for agriculture to boost food production and improve livelihoods, emphasising its importance during the inauguration of a new rural road connecting Kampong Mulaut, Kampong Tanjong Nangka, and Kampong Bebatik on 16 September.

At Sultan Hassanal Bolkiah's proclamation ceremony on 5 October 1967, Pengiran Muhammad Yusuf delivered an emotional pledge of unwavering loyalty on behalf of government officials and the people, his voice breaking with emotion. He expressed confidence that the sultan would follow his father's example in ruling Brunei. On 11 December 1967, he expressed regret over certain representatives' attempts to misinterpret the sultan's speech during the opening of the LegCo session.

On 8 January 1968, Pengiran Muhammad Yusuf announced the date of Sultan Hassanal Bolkiah's coronation on Radio Brunei, describing it as a traditional ceremony that would bring prosperity to the nation and its people. On 4 November, he was confirmed into office as chief minister following Marsal's retirement.

Pengiran Muhammad Yusuf officially announced the renaming of Brunei Town to Bandar Seri Begawan on 4 October 1970, during a ceremony attended by thousands, marking a significant milestone in Brunei's development under the leadership of the new sultan. On 23 October 1970, he laid the foundation stone for the Tugu Chenderamata in Seria, thanking Belait residents for commemorating Sultan Omar Ali Saifuddien III's contributions to Brunei's development. On 15 July 1972, Pengiran Abdul Momin was appointed as acting chief minister, temporarily taking over Pengiran Muhammad Yusuf. He completed his tenure as chief minister and retired from the government in December 1973.

== Later life ==
After retiring, Pengiran Muhammad Yusuf held several prominent positions, including serving as a member of the Adat Istiadat Council in 1974 and the Privy Council in February 1989. He was also a director of Brunei Press from 1989 to 2000, as well as a director of Baiduri Bank and Baiduri Security from 1994 to June 2000. In 1992, he was appointed to the committee responsible for reviewing and proposing amendments to Brunei's constitution. His brief diplomatic career began with his appointment as Brunei's high commissioner to Malaysia on 17 November 1995, followed by his role as ambassador to Japan from September 2001 to September 2002.

Pengiran Muhammad Yusuf was appointed to the LegCo on 6 September 2004. On 14 March 2011, he emphasised the importance of careful judgment in decision-making and praised his fellow LegCo members for their wisdom. The speaker, Isa Ibrahim, recognised him as the "father of the house" and a living record of Brunei's history. On 26 March 2013, he raised concerns about the empowerment of Brunei's youth, leading to discussions on various government initiatives aimed at fostering youth development.

== Death and funeral ==
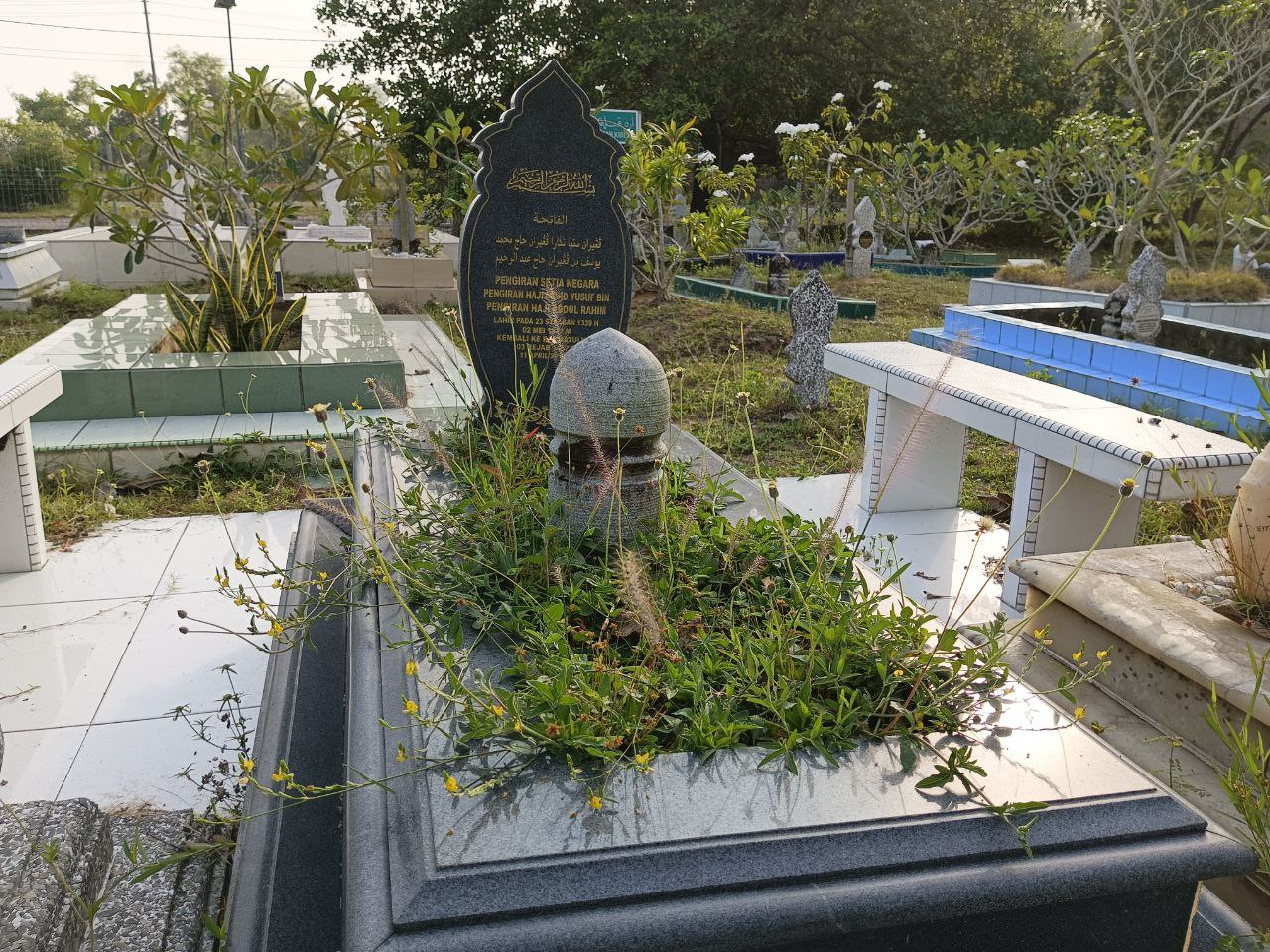
Grave of Pengiran Setia Negara Hj Yusof bin Pengiran Abd Rahim at Sengkarai Muslim Cemetery

Pengiran Muhammad Yusuf died in his sleep at the age of 92 at 9:37 a.m. on 11 April 2016 at his residence, Teratak Yura, in Kampong Sengkarai, Tutong District. Sultan Hassanal Bolkiah paid his last respects and joined the mass prayers led by State Mufti Abdul Aziz Juned. He was laid to rest at the Sengkarai Muslim Cemetery. Meanwhile, his son, Pengiran Haji Yura Halim, received a letter of condolence from Japan's Minister for Foreign Affairs, Fumio Kishida, through the Japanese embassy in Brunei.

== Personal life ==
Pengiran Muhammad Yusuf was married to Datin Hajah Salmah binti Mohammad Yussof, and together they had seven sons and four daughters: Pengiran Yura Halim, Pengiran Yura Kesteria, Pengiran Yura Laila, Pengiran Yura Perkasa (married to Pengiran Anak Hajah Mastura), Pengiran Yura Dupa Khodadat, Pengiran Yura Muhammad Abai, Pengiran Yura Alaiti (married to Adnan Buntar), Pengiran Yura Muliati, and Pengiran Yura Nurulhayaty. He was also the uncle of Pengiran Shariffuddin, the first director of the Brunei Museum. Additionally, he had a half-brother, Pengiran Jaya Negara Pengiran Haji Abdul Rahman, and was the uncle of Pengiran Anak Isteri Pengiran Norhayati.

== Literacy career ==
=== Themes ===
Pengiran Muhammad Yusuf began writing in the 1930s and used various pseudonyms, including Tunas Negara, Sekunar Hayat, and Yura Halim. His works span several genres, including poetry, short stories, and essays. He is particularly recognised for publishing Mahkota Berdarah in 1951, which marked the beginning of modern fiction in Brunei and contributed to the development of the country's literary scene rooted in Malay tradition, alongside classical and oral texts like Syair Awang Semaun and Silsilah Raja-Raja Berunai. His Sekayu Tiga Bangsi (1965) was the first published collection of Brunei poetry and the first Brunei novel.

=== Selected works ===
His notable works include Antologi Sajak bersama Puisi Hidayat II (1976), Antologi Sajak bersama Pakatan (1976), Antologi Puisi bersama Hari Depan (1980), Antologi Puisi bersama Bunga Rampai Sastera Melayu Brunei (1984), and Antologi Sastera ASEAN, Puisi Moden Brunei Darussalam (1994). Over the years, he has authored numerous books, with many of his selected works playing a key role in shaping Brunei's literary landscape.

- P. M. Yusuf (1975). "Adat istiadat diraja Brunei Darussalam". Brunei Museum Journal (in Malay). 3. Bandar Seri Begawan: Jabatan Muzium-Muzium: 43–108.
- Yura Halim (1987). Mahkota Berdarah (in Malay). Bandar Seri Begawan: Dewan Bahasa dan Pustaka.
- Yura Halim (1993). Adat Mengulum Bahasa (in Malay). Bandar Seri Begawan: Dewan bahasa Dan Pustaka. ISBN 978-99917-0-438-8.
- Yura Halim (2002). Ririsej Brunei Darussalam (in Malay). Bandar Seri Begawan: Dewan Bahasa dan Pustaka. ISBN 978-99917-0-251-3.
- Pengiran Haji Mohamed Yusuf Pengiran Haji Abdul Rahim (2014). Barat-Timur dan Bom Atom (in Malay). Bandar Seri Begawan: Dewan Bahasa dan Pustaka. ISBN 978-99917-0-958-1.
- Yura Halim (2017). Mahkota Yang Berdarah (in Malay). Bandar Seri Begawan: Dewan Bahasa dan Pustaka. ISBN 978-99917-67-96-3.

== Titles, styles and honours ==
=== Titles and styles ===
Personal standard of Pengiran Setia Negara

On 12 January 1968, Pengiran Muhammad Yusuf was honoured by Sultan Hassanal Bolkiah with the cheteria title of Pengiran Jaya Negara. He was later elevated to the title of Pengiran Setia Negara on 16 May 1969. Each of these titles carries the style Yang Amat Mulia.

=== Awards ===
He has been given the following awards:

- ASEAN Award (1987)
- SEA Write Award (1993)
- Pemimpin Belia Berjasa (1 August 2006)
- Tokoh Jasawan Ugama Negara Brunei Darussalam (28 December 2008)

=== Honours ===
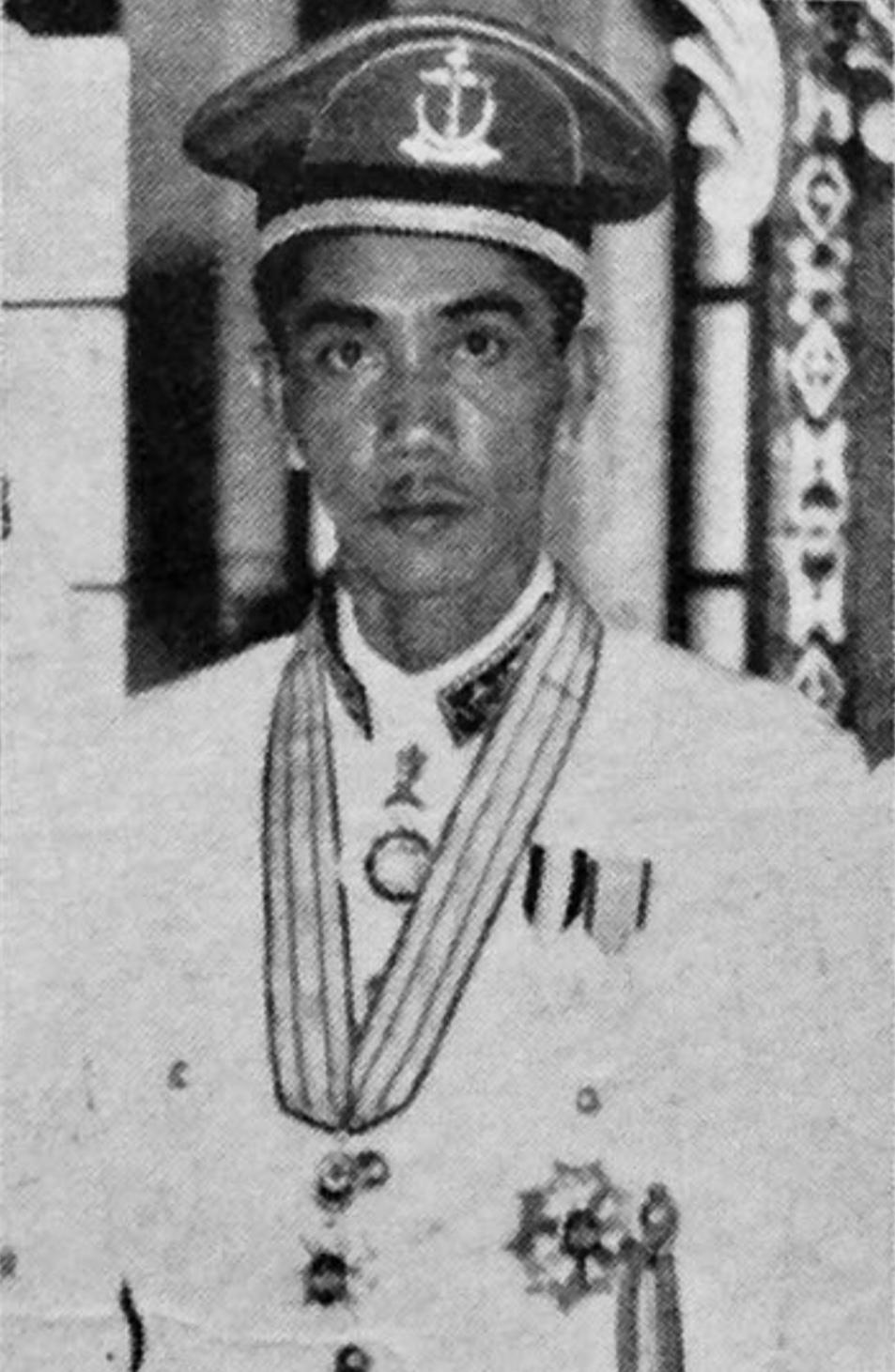
Pengiran Muhammad Yusuf at the DSNB bestowment ceremony in 1960

Pengiran Muhammad Yusuf has been bestowed the following honours:

National

- Family Order of Laila Utama (DK; 1968) – Dato Laila Utama'
- Order of Seri Paduka Mahkota Brunei First Class (SPMB; 23 September 1963) – Dato Seri Paduka
- Order of Seri Paduka Mahkota Brunei Third Class (SMB; 23 September 1958)
- Order of Setia Negara Brunei Second Class (DSNB; 24 November 1960) – Dato Setia
- Omar Ali Saifuddin Medal (POAS; 1962)
- Sultan Hassanal Bolkiah Medal First Class (PHBS; 15 July 1970)
- Meritorious Service Medal (PJK; 23 September 1959)
- Long Service Medal (PKL; 23 September 1959)
- Pingat Bakti Laila Ikhlas (PBLI; 2008)
- Coronation Medal (1 August 1968)
- Campaign Medal (1963)
- Universiti Brunei Darussalam Honorary Doctorate (1996)

Foreign

- Canada:
  - International Academic Vancouver Honorary Doctorate (1960)
- Japan:
  - Grand Cordon of the Order of the Rising Sun (1985)
  - Hiroshima University Honorary Doctorate
- United Kingdom:
  - Commander of the Order of the British Empire (CBE; 1969)
- United States:
  - University of Southern Indiana Honorary Doctorate (2002)

=== Things named after him ===
- Pengiran Setia Negara Pengiran Mohd Yusof Primary School, a school named after him in Seria.
- Dewan Pengiran Setia Negara, a hall at the Information Department headquarters in Berakas.
- Jalan Setia Negara, a road between Kuala Belait and Pandan.

== Notes ==
Diplomatic posts
Preceded by Malai Ahmad Murad	Ambassador of Brunei to Japan; 26 December 2001 – 2002	Succeeded by Nor Jeludin
Preceded by Pengiran Jaya	High Commissioner of Brunei to Malaysia; 17 November 1995 – 2001	Succeeded by Amin Abdul Rahim
Political offices
Preceded by Marsal Maun	3rd Menteri Besar; 4 November 1968 – December 1973	Succeeded by Pengiran Abdul Momin
Preceded by Raja Azam	3rd State Secretary of Brunei; 18 January 1964 – December 1966	Succeeded by Taib Besar (Acting)
