= List of ambassadors of Brunei to Japan =

Coordinates: 35.6258836°N 139.7326837°E

Ambassador of Brunei to Japan
- 在日ブルネイ大使
- Emblem of Brunei
- Incumbent; Shahbudin Musa since 16 May 2019
- Style: His Excellency
- Residence: Tokyo
- Appointer: Sultan of Brunei
- Term length: At His Majesty's pleasure
- Inaugural holder: Puteh Mohamed Alam
- Formation: 1984
- Website: Official website

The Bruneian ambassador in Tokyo is the official representative of the Government in Bandar Seri Begawan to the Government of Japan.

== List of ambassadors ==
Diplomatic agrément/Diplomatic accreditation	Ambassador	Observations	Prime Minister of Brunei	Emperor of Japan	Term end
1984	Pengiran Indera Negara Pengiran Anak Haji Puteh ibni Al-Marhum Pengiran Pemancha Pengiran Anak Haji Mohamed Alam	First ambassador to Japan, with dual accreditation to South Korea.	Hassanal Bolkiah	Emperor Shōwa	1985
1985	Pengiran Dato Paduka Haji Idris bin Duli Pengiran Temenggong Pengiran Haji Mohammad	Attended the funeral ceremony of Emperor Shōwa in 1989, and later attended the enthronement of Emperor Akihito in 1989.	Hassanal Bolkiah	Emperor Shōwa	
1996	Dato Paduka Haji Yusoff bin Haji Abdul Hamid		Hassanal Bolkiah	Emperor Akihito	1997
30 September 1997	Dato Paduka Malai Haji Ahmad Murad bin Haji Malai Mashhor		Hassanal Bolkiah	Emperor Akihito	2001
26 December 2001	Pengiran Setia Negara Pengiran Haji Mohd. Yusuf bin Pengiran Haji Abdul Rahim	Ambassador awarded the Order of the Rising Sun Grand Cordon in 1985.	Hassanal Bolkiah	Emperor Akihito	2002
31 March 2003	Dato Paduka Haji Mohammed Nor bin Haji Jeludin	In December 2003, the Sultan paid a visit to Tokyo to attend the Japan-ASEAN summit talks.	Hassanal Bolkiah	Emperor Akihito	2004
14 November 2005	Dato Paduka Haji Mohd Adnan bin Buntar	The Sultan visited Japan in 2007; Princess Masna in 2006. A Memorandum of Understanding (MoU) is signed in 2006 between Kagawa University and Universiti Brunei Darussalam.	Hassanal Bolkiah	Emperor Akihito	October 2008
23 February 2009	Mohammad Alias bin Serbini	The Sultan visited Japan in 2010 for the 18th APEC Economic Leaders' Meeting.	Hassanal Bolkiah	Emperor Akihito	2012
21 September 2012	Haji Mahamud bin Haji Ahmad	On 13 May 2013, Shinzo Abe met with the Sultan in the Prime Minister's Office.	Hassanal Bolkiah	Emperor Akihito	2017
10 May 2017	Kamilah binti Haji Mohd. Hanifah	Taro Kono paid his first visit to Brunei in February 2018.	Hassanal Bolkiah	Emperor Akihito	2018
16 May 2019	Haji Shahbudin bin Haji Musa	Yōko Kamikawa held substantial discussions with Erywan Yusof during her working visit to Brunei in October 2023. That same month, the Ministry of Health and Osaka University signed a MoU for the training of health professionals.	Hassanal Bolkiah	Emperor Naruhito	Incumbent

== Gallery ==
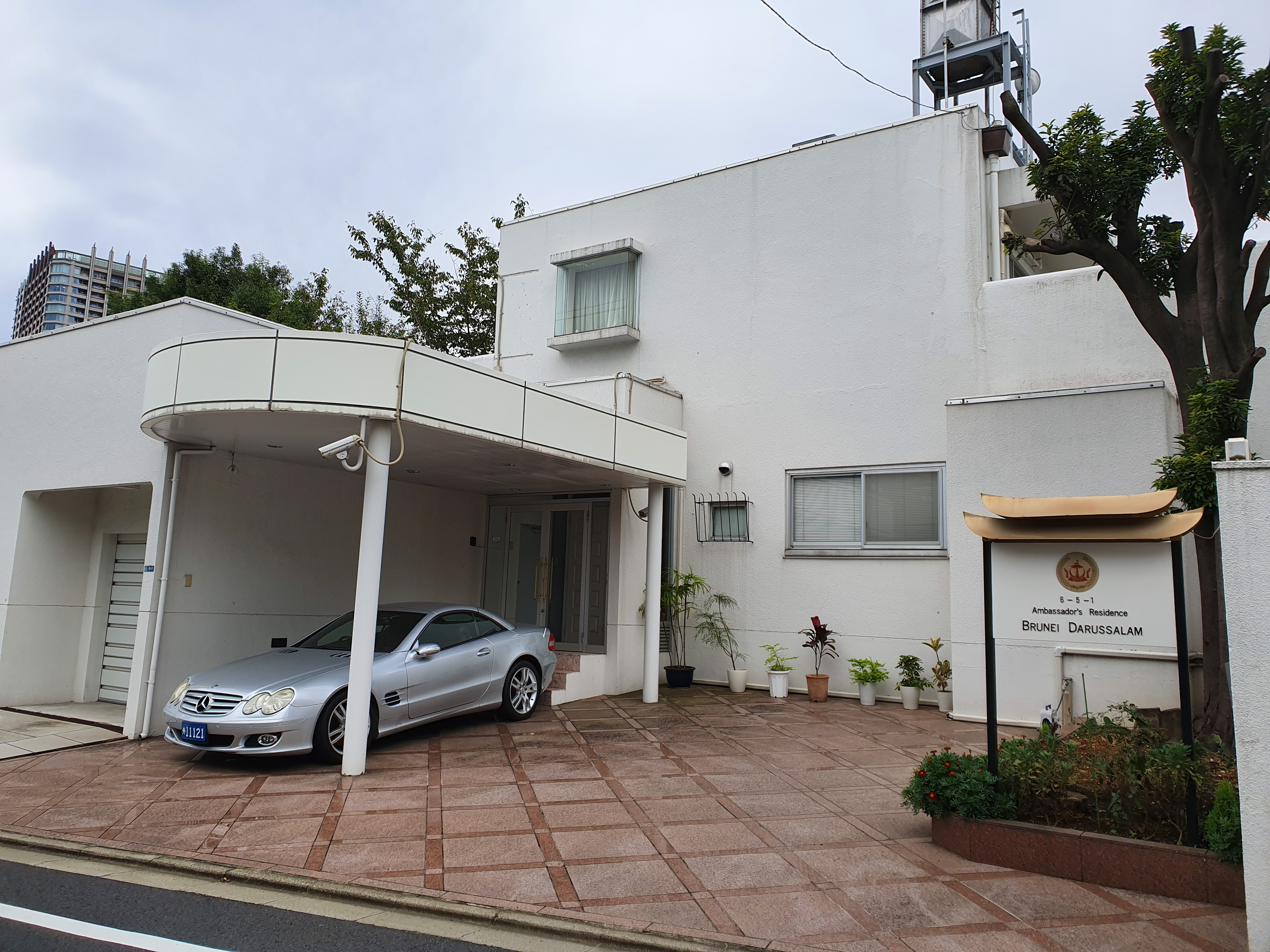
The Brunei Embassy in Tokyo

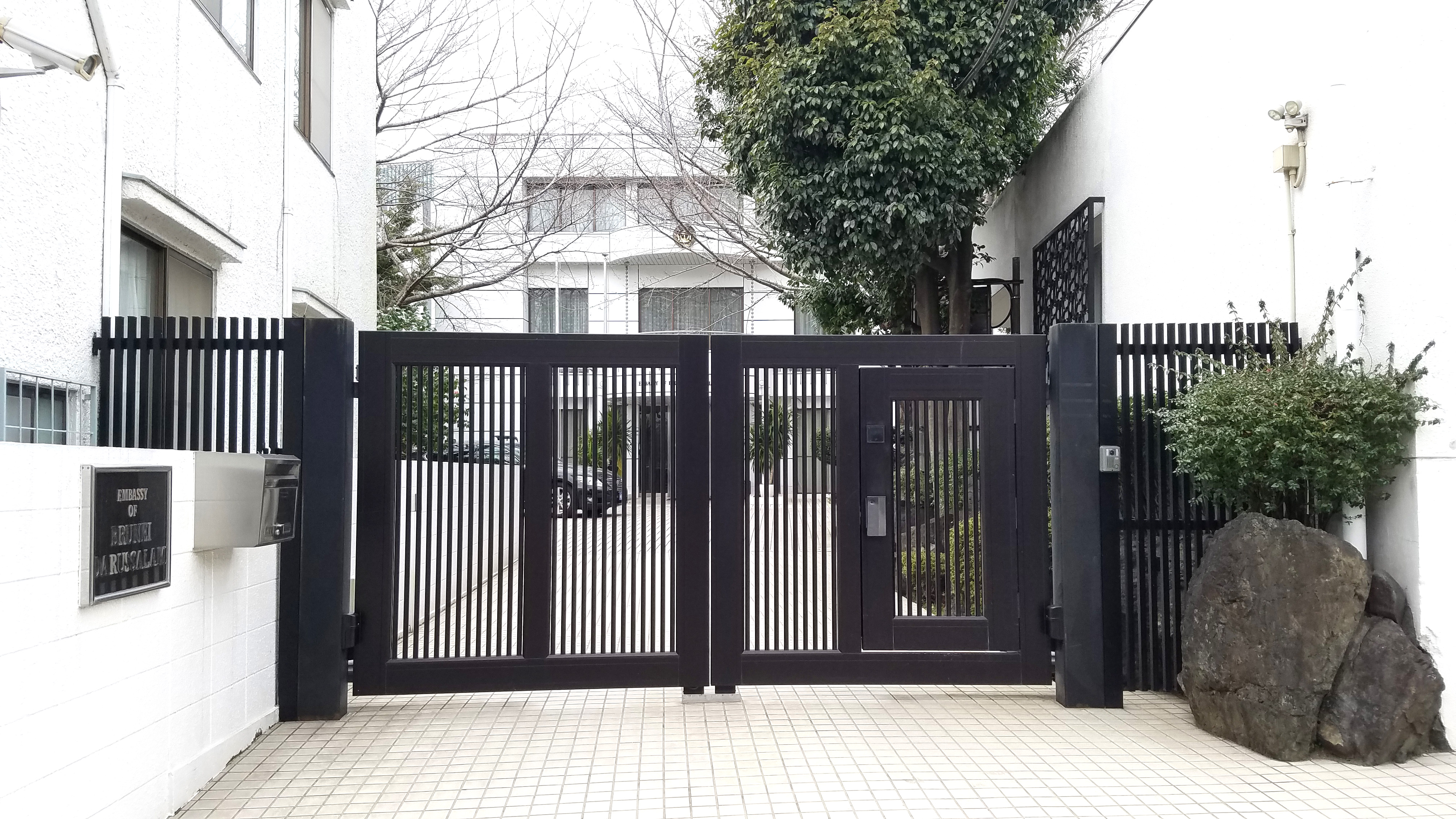
The embassy's main gate

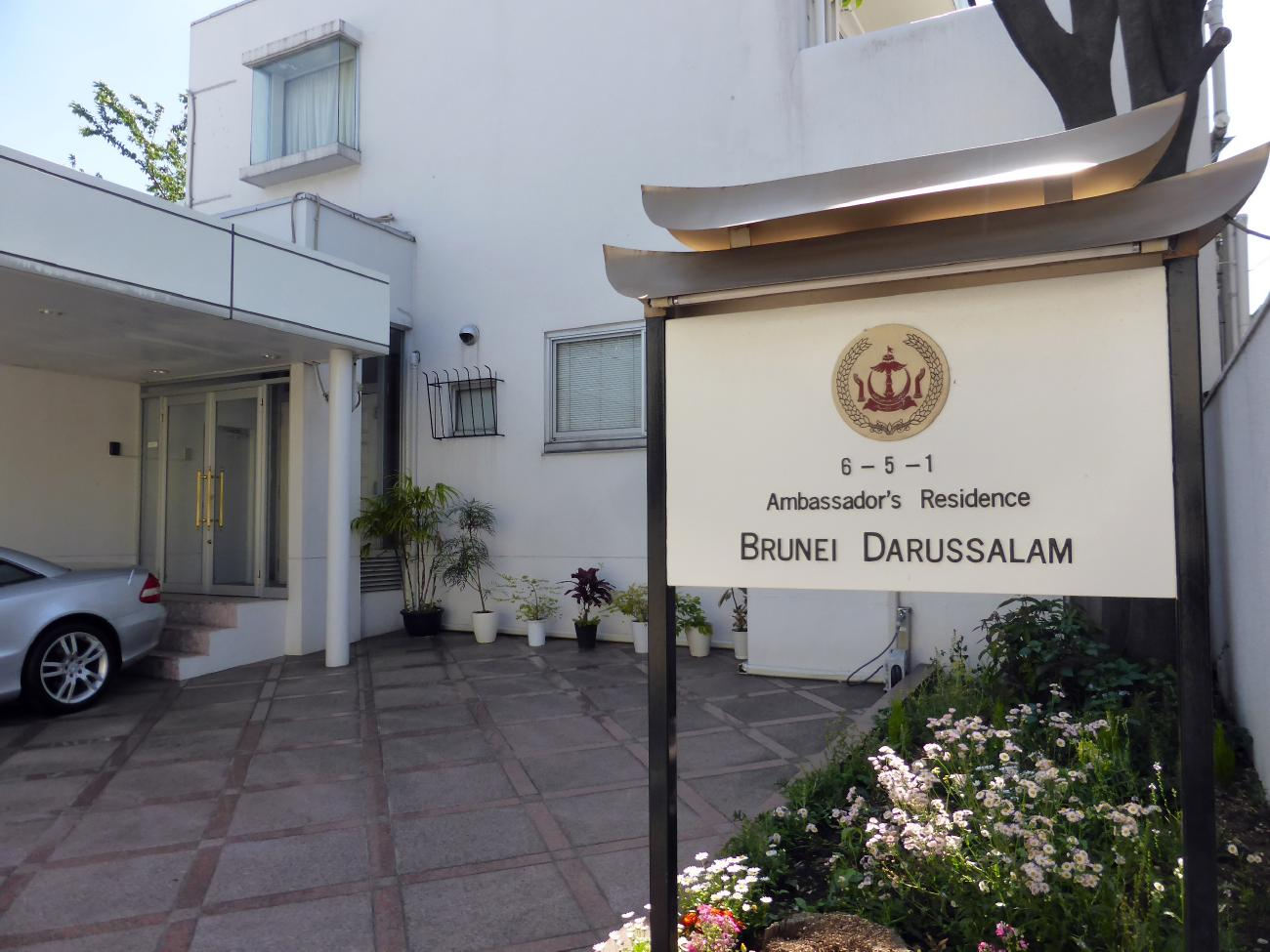
Entrance to the embassy

== See also ==
- Foreign relations of Brunei
- Brunei–Japan relations
