= Yusoff Abdul Hamid =

Bruneian politician and diplomat (born 1949)

Dato Paduka Yusoff Abdul Hamid DPMB SNB PIKB
- يوسف عبدالحميد
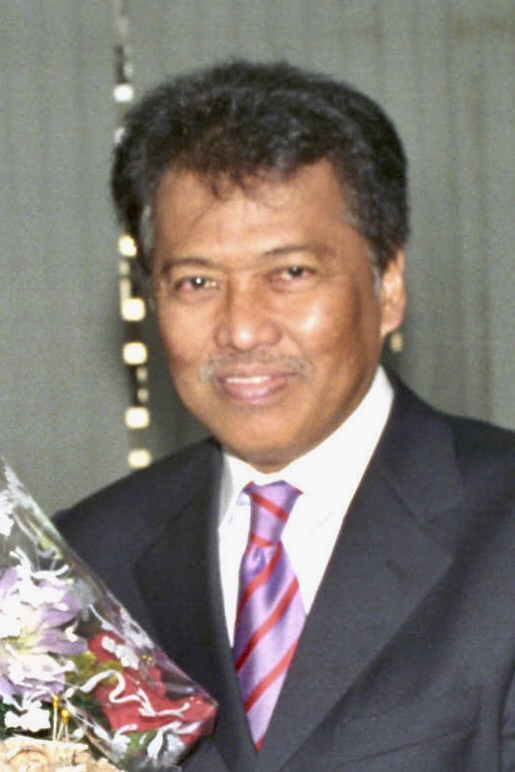
- Yusoff in 2005

1st Deputy Minister of Communications
- In office 24 May 2005 – October 2009
- Monarch: Hassanal Bolkiah
- Minister: Abu Bakar Apong
- Preceded by: Office established
- Succeeded by: Office abolished
Other positions
Chairman of Brunei Economic Development Board
In office 2001–2004
Preceded by	Office reestablished
Succeeded by	Mohammad Daud
Diplomatic positions
Ambassador of Brunei to the United States
In office 4 November 2009 – 2016
Preceded by	Pengiran Anak Puteh
Succeeded by	Serbini Ali
Ambassador of Brunei to Belgium
In office 25 October 2004 – May 2005
Preceded by	Mashor Ahmad
Succeeded by	Yunus Mahmud
High Commissioner of Brunei to the United Kingdom
In office 8 December 1999 – 2001
Preceded by	Mustapha Metassan
Succeeded by	Yunus Mahmud
Ambassador of Brunei to Japan
In office 1996–1997
Preceded by	Idris Mohammad
Succeeded by	Malai Ahmad Murad
High Commissioner of Brunei to Australia
In office 1993–1996
Succeeded by	Malai Ahmad Murad

Personal details
- Born: 1 March 1949 Kuala Belait, Belait, Brunei
- Education: Birmingham City University (BA); Royal Institute of Public Administration; University of Oxford; Tufts University
- Occupation: Politician; diplomat

Yusoff bin Abdul Hamid (born 1 March 1949) is a retired diplomat and politician from Brunei who served as the Deputy Minister of Communications from 2005 to 2009, the high commissioner and ambassador to several countries, including the United States and United Kingdom.

== Education ==
Yusoff attended college in the United Kingdom, earning a Bachelor of Arts (with honours) in economics from City of Birmingham Polytechnic in 1976. He proceeded to work as an administrative officer in the Treasury Department for four years after finishing his education. He got a Certificate in Financial management from the Royal Institute of Public Administration in London during this time in 1979.

== Career ==
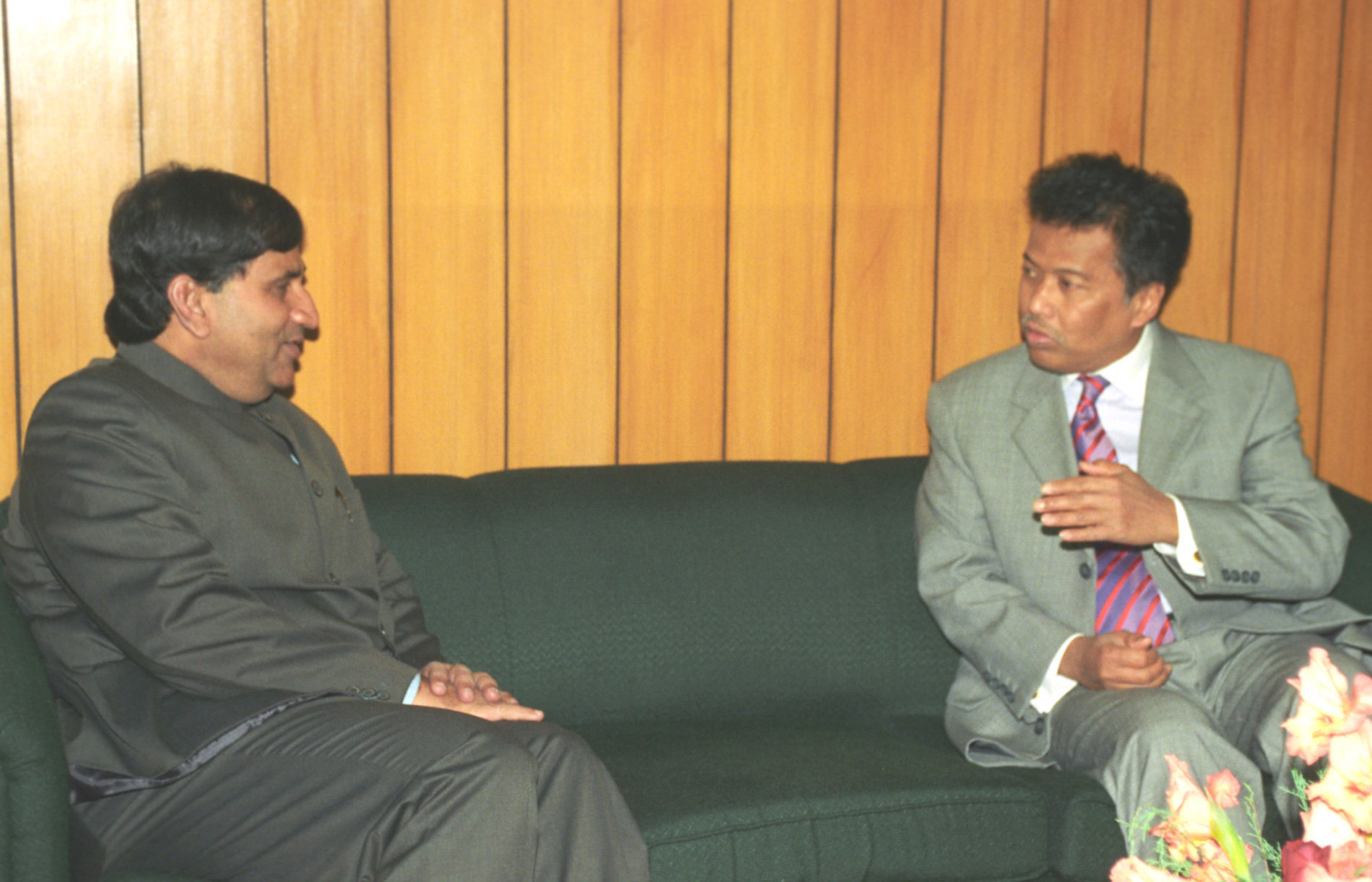
Shakeel Ahmad and Yusoff in 2005

Yusoff worked as a private and confidential secretary to Prince Mohamed Bolkiah, the minister of foreign affairs, for the first half of the 1980s. In 1982, he further completed his study, earning a Diplomacy Certificate from Oxford University and attending a conference on the goals and techniques of development cooperation at the German Foundation in Berlin. He was the director of the Ministry of Foreign Affairs' Economic Department from 1986 to 1988. While obtaining a master's degree in law and diplomacy at Tufts University in the United States in 1987. He was then appointed director of the ASEAN Department at the Ministry of Foreign Affairs, a position he held until 1992.

Yusoff was appointed High Commissioner to Australia the following year and served for four years. His first ambassadorship was to Japan in 1996. In 1997, he was appointed deputy permanent secretary in the ministry, and in 2000, he was promoted to high commissioner to the United Kingdom and ambassador to Ireland. He was chairman of the Economic Development Board from 2001 until 2004. He was appointed ambassador to Belgium on 25 October 2004. The following year, he was appointed as the head of the Brunei Mission to the European Union, as well as ambassador to the Netherlands and Hungary, and as Brunei's permanent representative to the Organisation for the Prohibition of Chemical Weapons. Later same year, he was appointed deputy minister of communications, a position he held until he was appointed ambassador to the United States. On 20 August 2009, Sultan Hassanal Bolkiah handed Letters of Credentials to newly appointed Brunei envoys at Istana Nurul Iman.

== Personal life ==
Yusoff was born on 1 March 1949, in Kuala Belait, is married to Mahani bin Abu Zar, and they have three sons and one daughter. He enjoys golf, walking, and jogging while he is not handling foreign affairs for his country.

== Honours ==
Yusoff has earned the following honours:

- Order of Seri Paduka Mahkota Brunei Second Class (DPMB) – Dato Paduka
- Order of Setia Negara Brunei Third Class (SNB)
- Order of Setia Negara Brunei Fourth Class (PSB)
- Excellent Service Medal (PIKB)

Political offices
Preceded by Office established	1st Deputy Minister of Communications; 24 May 2005 – October 2009	Succeeded by Office abolished
Business positions
Preceded by Office reestablished	Chairman of Brunei Economic Development Board; 2001–2004	Succeeded by Mohammad Daud
Diplomatic posts
Preceded by Pengiran Anak Puteh	Ambassador of Brunei to the United States; 4 November 2009 – 2016	Succeeded by Serbini Ali
Preceded by Mashor Ahmad	Ambassador of Brunei to Belgium; 25 October 2004 – May 2005	Succeeded by Yunus Mahmud
Preceded by Mustapha Metassan	High Commissioner of Brunei to the United Kingdom; 8 December 1999 – 2001	Succeeded by Yunus Mahmud
Preceded by Idris Mohammad	Ambassador of Brunei to Japan; 1996–1997	Succeeded by Malai Ahmad Murad
