= Pengiran Anak Puteh =

Bruneian arbitrator and diplomat (born 1951)

Yang Amat Mulia Pengiran Indera Negara Pengiran Anak Puteh ڤڠيرن انق ڤوته DSLJ PJK PKL
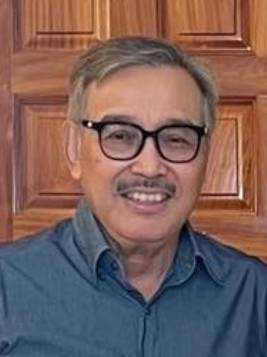
- Pengiran Anak Puteh in 2023

Ambassador of Brunei to the United States
- In office 14 May 1997 – 4 November 2009
- Monarch: Hassanal Bolkiah
- Preceded by: Jaya Abdul Latif
- Succeeded by: Yusoff Abdul Hamid

Ambassador of Brunei to Japan
- In office 1984–1985
- Preceded by: Office established
- Succeeded by: Pengiran Idris

Personal details
- Born: 19 January 1951 (age 75) Brunei
- Spouse: Kamilah Abdullah
- Relations: Pengiran Anak Mohammad Yusof (brother); Pengiran Anak Saleha (sister)
- Parent(s): Pengiran Anak Mohamed Alam (father); Pengiran Anak Besar (mother)
- Education: University of London (BSc); Fletcher School of Law & Diplomacy (MA); University of Birmingham (MJur)
- Occupation: Arbitrator; diplomat

Pengiran Anak Puteh (born 19 January 1951), also referred to as Pengiran Puteh Alam, is a Bruneian nobleman, arbitrator and diplomat as the ambassador of Brunei to the United States from 1997 to 2009, and Japan in 1986. As the permanent secretary at the Ministry of Foreign Affairs, he participated in the formulation of policy regarding matters pertaining to international law, the South China Sea dispute, and the land and marine frontiers of the United Nations Convention on the Law of the Sea. His areas of expertise include international commercial arbitration, sports arbitration, investment arbitration, and international law.

== Education ==
Pengiran Puteh Alam obtained his BSc in Psychology from the London University, United Kingdom in 1976; Certificate in Diplomacy from the Oxford University in 1983; MA in International relations from the Fletcher School of Law & Diplomacy, United States in 1986. Lastly, he obtained his Magister Juris (MJur) law degree from the University of Birmingham School of Law.

== Career ==
Puteh's career began as an Administrative Officer with the Public Service Commission in 1976, Senior Administrative Officer with the Diplomatic Service Department in 1980, Director of Department of Protocol & Consular Affairs in the Ministry of Foreign Affairs from 1984 to 1986, Deputy Permanent secretary at the Ministry of Foreign Affairs from 1986 to 1987, Permanent Secretary at the Ministry of Foreign Affairs from 1987 to 1997, co-currently being the Ambassador to Japan and South Korea from 1984 to 1985, and to the United States in 1997. During his tenure in the United States, he was concurrently the non-resident ambassador to Peru and Mexico. During the Sultan Hassanal Bolkiah's first state visit to Japan following the country's independence, he accompanied to show his support.

== Other appointments ==
Other positions Pengiran Puteh Alam has held include President of Brunei Squash Racquet Association, and Brunei Karate Association. Vice-president Brunei Amateur Football Association (BAFA). Director of Sultan Haji Hassanal Bolkiah Foundation (YSHHB) since 1992. Additionally, he has been appointed as Deputy/Vice-president of Arbitration Association Brunei Darussalam (AABD). On 29 May 2021, he also agreed to give Kamaruddin Talib and Norain Ismail gifts in recognition of their contributions to karate in Brunei as both have played significant roles in the growth of karate in the country and have become representatives in prominent competitions.

Pengiran Puteh Alam has contributed to a conference volume project on the subject of "Corruption and Illegality in Asian Investment Arbitration" that included several professors from the Centre for Asian and Pacific Law at the University of Sydney (CAPLUS) was funded by the Institute of Asian Studies at the Universiti Brunei Darussalam (UBD-IAS).

== Personal life ==
Pengiran Puteh Alam is married to Datin Kamilah binti Abdullah, and together they have two children. His interests include; football, badminton, squash and golf. He is also the younger brother of Pengiran Anak Saleha, queen consort to Sultan Hassanal Bolkiah.

== Honours ==
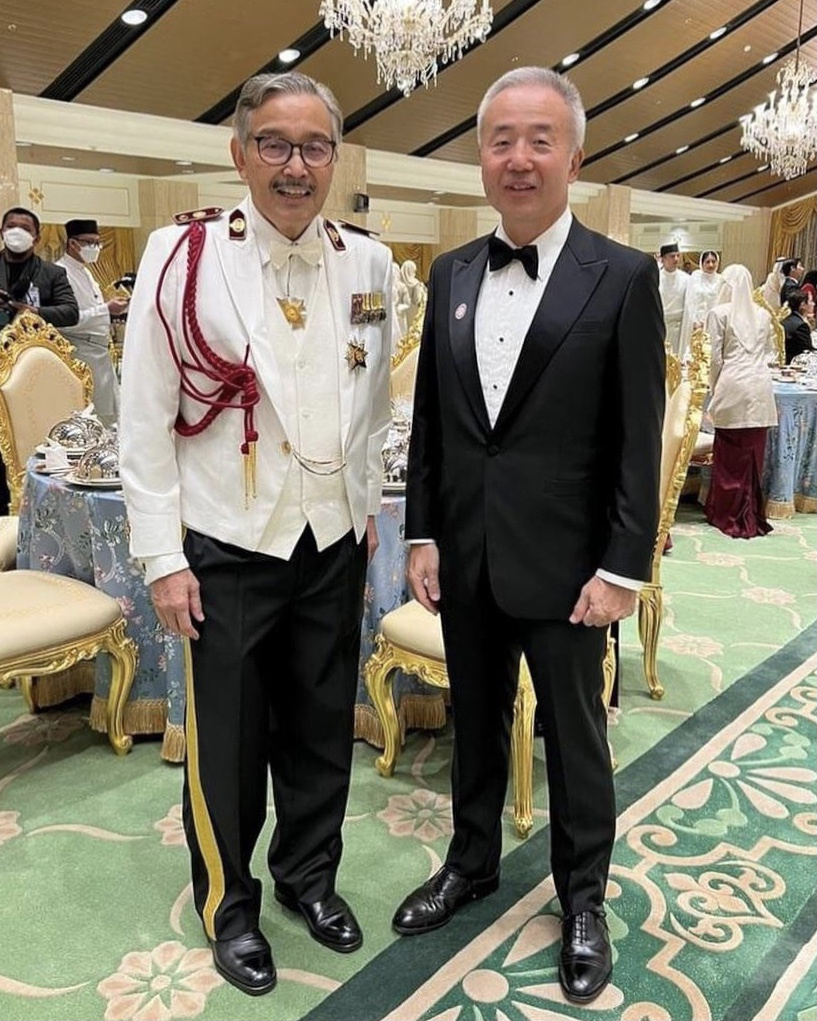
Pengiran Anak Puteh (left) at Istana Nurul Iman in 2023

Pengiran Puteh Alam was bestowed the title of Yang Amat Mulia Pengiran Indera Negara at the Lapau on 29 April 2004, marking him as a member of Cheteria. Moreover, he has earned the following honours;

National

- Order of Paduka Seri Laila Jasa Second Class (DSLJ; 1986) – Dato Seri Laila Jasa
- Meritorious Service Medal (PJK)
- Long Service Medal (PKL)

Foreign

- Egypt:
  - Order of Merit (17 December 1984)
- Japan:
  - Order of the Rising Sun Second Class (29 April 2023)

Diplomatic posts
Preceded by Jaya Abdul Latif	Ambassador of Brunei to the United States; 14 May 1997 – 4 November 2009	Succeeded by Yusoff Abdul Hamid
Preceded by Office established	Ambassador of Brunei to Japan; 1984–1985	Succeeded by Pengiran Idris
