= Nor Jeludin =

Bruneian diplomat

Dato Paduka Nor Jeludin DPMB SNB
- نور جيلودين
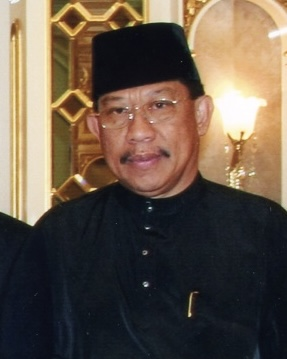
- Nor in 2007

Ambassador of Brunei to Japan
- In office 31 March 2003 – 2005
- Preceded by: Pengiran Muhammad Yusuf
- Succeeded by: Adnan Buntar

Personal details
- Born: Brunei
- Occupation: Diplomat

Mohammad Nor bin Haji Jeludin is a Brunei diplomat who became the ambassador to Japan from 2003 to 2005.

== Career ==
He was among the first Bruneians to enrol in the Japanese Language Program for Foreign Service Employees, which the Japanese Ministry of Foreign Affairs had suggested they do in 1984. Nor, Deputy Permanent Secretary of the Ministry of Foreign Affairs and Trade (MOFAT), welcomed King Abdullah II and Queen Rania Al-Abdullah upon their arrival at the Brunei International Airport on 14 May 2008.

After serving in many nations, he was named the Ambassador of Brunei to Japan from 2003 to 2005. Nor participated in high-profile events while he was sent there, such as Sultan Hassanal Bolkiah's trip to Japan in December 2003 and Crown Prince Naruhito's trip to the Sultanate to attend Prince Al-Muhtadee Billah's wedding in 2004.

The Sultan and his high-ranking officials including Nor, were given a formal welcome by Governor-General Quentin Bryce at Government House in Canberra on 2 May 2013. In February 2019, Wan Azizah and her diginitaries were greeted by Nor, Permanent Secretary and Chief of Protocol at the MOFAT. On 26 to 28 March 2019, he was one of the Bruneian delegates visiting Vietnam at Nguyễn Phú Trọng's invitation.

On 23 November 2020, in front of Nor's husband and family, at the Japanese Embassy in Brunei Darussalam, Ambassador Eiji Yamamoto bestowed upon Nor the Order of the Rising Sun. After his tenure in Japan, he was reappointed as the permanent secretary and Chief of Protocol at the Ministry of Foreign Affairs.

== Personal life ==
Nor is the son of Haji Jeludin bin Ahmad (died 2015). He is married to Jauyah Mohd Davd.

== Honours ==
He has earned the following honours;

National

- Order of Seri Paduka Mahkota Brunei Second Class (DPMB) – Dato Paduka
- Order of Setia Negara Brunei Third Class (SNB; 15 July 2005)

Foreign

- Japan:
  - Order of the Rising Sun Second Class (23 November 2020)

Diplomatic posts
Preceded by Pengiran Muhammad Yusuf	Ambassador of Brunei to Japan; 31 March 2003 – 2005	Succeeded by Adnan Buntar
