= Kamilah Hanifah =

Bruneian diplomat

- کاميله هانيفه
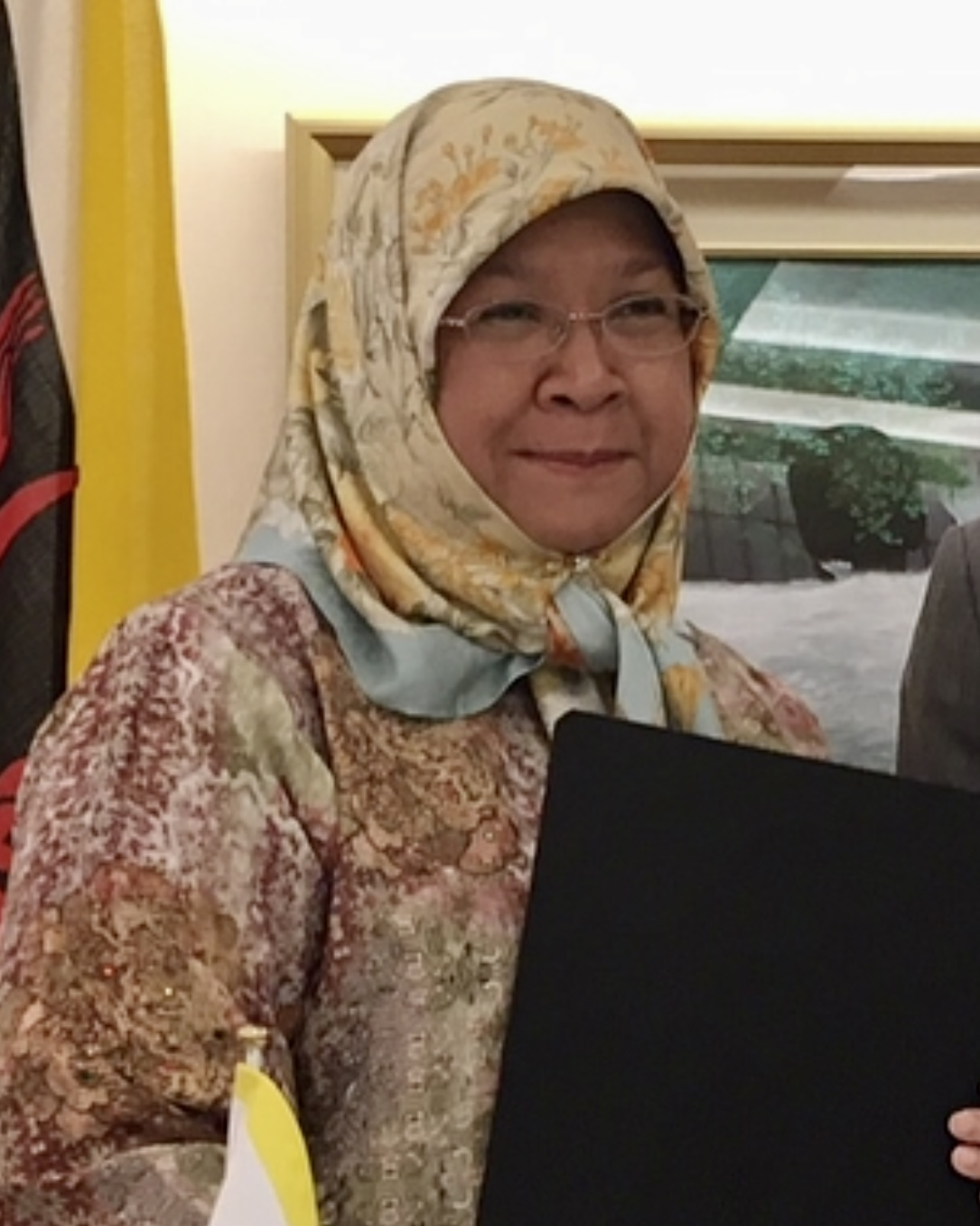
- Ambassador Kamilah in 2018

Ambassador of Brunei to Japan
- In office 10 May 2017 – 2018
- Preceded by: Mahamud Ahmad
- Succeeded by: Shahbudin Musa

Personal details
- Born: Brunei
- Occupation: Diplomat

Kamilah binti Haji Mohd Hanifah is a Bruneian diplomat who became the ambassador to Japan since 2017, and the former consul general in Hong Kong.

== Diplomatic career ==
Kamilah was a Senior Special Duties Officer in the Department of Economic Cooperation of the Ministry of Foreign Affairs and Trade (MOFAT) earlier in her career. She would later be appointed as the consul general in Hong Kong. Song Zhe met with her on 5 November 2012, to discuss their respective perspectives on bilateral ties as well as Hong Kong and Brunei's interchange and collaboration.

On 28 February 2017, Prince Al-Muhtadee Billah consented to meet Kamilah and the other recently nominated ambassadors from Brunei. Earlier on the 15th, she got the Letter of Appointment from Sultan Hassanal Bolkiah. On 10 May, she presented her credentials to Japan's Ministry of Foreign Affairs. Motohiko Kato and her signed diplomatic notes on 24 August 2018, in Tokyo, to amend the agreement's attachment regarding air services in order to encourage the liberalization of air travel between the two nations.

During the symposium's closing remarks on 1 March 2018, Kamilah, the chair of the ASEAN-Japan Center, mentioned that the ASEAN member states have been collaborating closely with one another as well as with allies like Japan to create a peaceful, prosperous, and inclusive region. She also said that as ASEAN moves toward open regionalism and confronts the rising tendency of protectionism in the ensuing ten years.

Diplomatic posts
Preceded by Mahamud Ahmad	Ambassador of Brunei to Japan; 10 May 2017 – 2018	Succeeded by Shahbudin Musa
