= Malai Ahmad Murad =

Bruneian civil servant and diplomat (1943–2004)

Dato Paduka Malai Ahmad Murad DPMB PIKB PKL GCrS
- احمد مراد
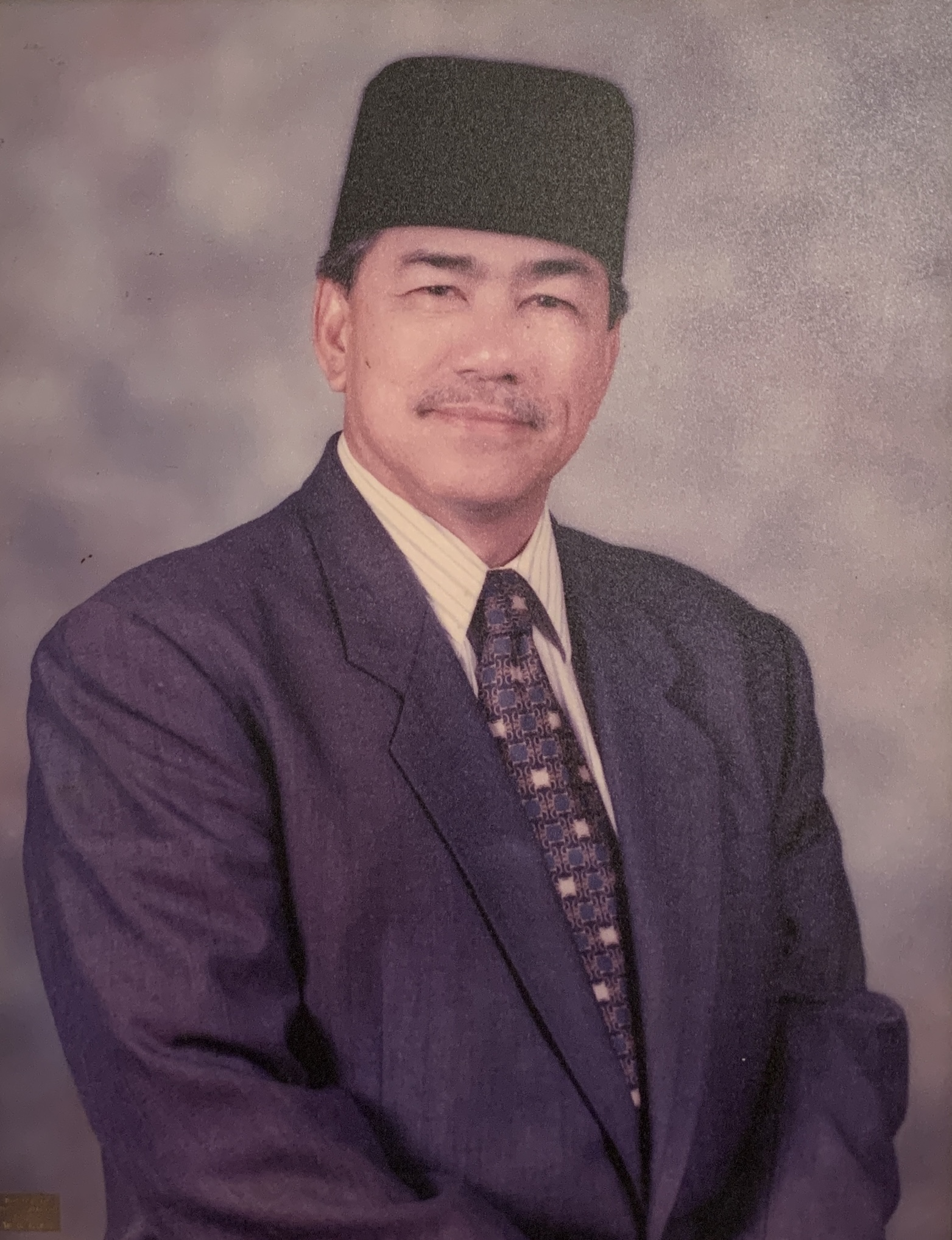

Ambassador of Brunei to the United Arab Emirates
- In office 15 August 2001 – August 2003
- Preceded by: Office established
- Succeeded by: Adanan Zainal

Ambassador of Brunei to Japan
- In office 30 September 1997 – 2001
- Preceded by: Yusoff Abdul Hamid
- Succeeded by: Pengiran Muhammad Yusuf

High Commissioner of Brunei to Australia
- In office 1996–1997
- Preceded by: Yusoff Abdul Hamid
- Succeeded by: Jocklin Kongpaw

Ambassador of Brunei to the Philippines
- In office 1993–1996
- Succeeded by: Maimunah Elias

Ambassador of Brunei to Saudi Arabia
- In office 1987–1989

Ambassador of Brunei to Egypt
- In office 1984–1986
- Succeeded by: Mohammad Daud

Personal details
- Born: 1943 Brunei
- Died: 2004 (aged 62)
- Spouse: Rafeah Mohd. Yassin
- Education: Al-Azhar University (BA); University of Birmingham; University of Oxford
- Occupation: Civil servant and diplomat

Malai Ahmad Murad bin Syed Mashhor (1943–2004) was a Brunei diplomat who became the ambassador to the Philippines from 1993 to 1996, Japan from 1997 to 2001, United Arab Emirates from 2001 to 2004, and the high commissioner to Australia from 1996 to 1997.

== Education ==
Malai Ahmad studied at Al-Azhar University and graduated with a Bachelor of Arts in Islamic Law. He then continued his education at Birmingham University, where he earned a Diploma in Education, and he then enrolled in a diplomatic degree at the University of Oxford.

== Career ==
Malai Ahmad started working for the government in 1971, first as a lecturer for the Hassanal Bolkiah Arab Secondary School. He succeeded Othman Bidin as principal of the Seri Begawan Sultan Teacher Training College in 1975. He moved into the diplomatic sphere in 1981 and served as the Ministry of Foreign Affairs' Senior Administrative Officer from 1981 to 1984.

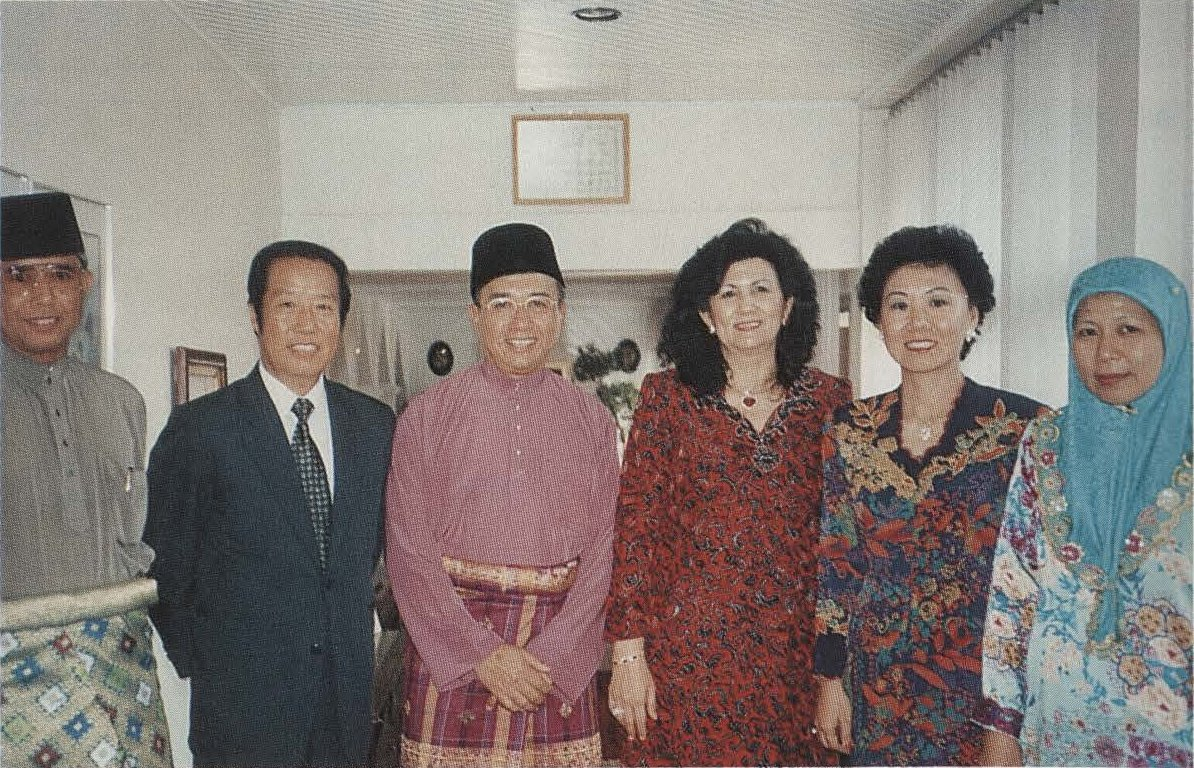
Malai Ahmad (left) with the Korean ambassador to Brunei, Abdul Rahman Taib, and their wives in 1997

Before being assigned to positions at the Ministry of Foreign Affairs in Bandar Seri Begawan, he initially served as director of the Political Department before becoming the Director of Administration. He then served as ambassador to Saudi Arabia from 1987 to 1989 and Egypt from 1984 to 1986. He traveled with Sultan Hassanal Bolkiah in 1987 as part of his entourage. After that, he held ambassadorial posts in Japan from 1997 to 2001, and the Philippines from 1993 to 1996, interlaced with a term serving as the high commissioner in Australia from 1996 to 1997. On 15 August 2001, the Sultan gave him his letters of appointment as ambassador to the United Arab Emirates during a ceremony at the Istana Nurul Iman.

== Death ==
Malai Ahmad died while still in office as ambassador to United Arab Emirates. Adanan Zainal, his successor, was named in April 2004.

== Personal life ==
Malai Ahmad was born in 1943, and he married Rafeah binti Mohd. Yassin. (1946/8/10 - 2025/12/10)

== Honours ==
He has earned the following honours;

National

- Order of Seri Paduka Mahkota Brunei Second Class (DPMB) – Dato Paduka
- Excellent Service Medal (PIKB)
- Long Service Medal (PKL; 1996)

Foreign

- Philippines:
  - Grand Cross of the Order of Sikatuna (GCrS) – Datu (8 March 1996)

Diplomatic posts
Preceded by Office established	Ambassador of Brunei to the United Arab Emirates; 15 August 2001 – August 2003	Succeeded by Adanan Zainal
Preceded by Yusoff Abdul Hamid	Ambassador of Brunei to Japan; 30 September 1997 – 2001	Succeeded by Pengiran Muhammad Yusuf
Preceded by Yusoff Abdul Hamid	High Commissioner of Brunei to Australia; 1996–1997	Succeeded by Jocklin Kongpaw
Preceded by –	Ambassador of Brunei to the Philippines; 1993–1996	Succeeded by Maimunah Elias
