= List of ambassadors of Brunei to the United States =

Coordinates: 38.944486°N 77.069151°W

Ambassador of Brunei to the United States
- Emblem of Brunei

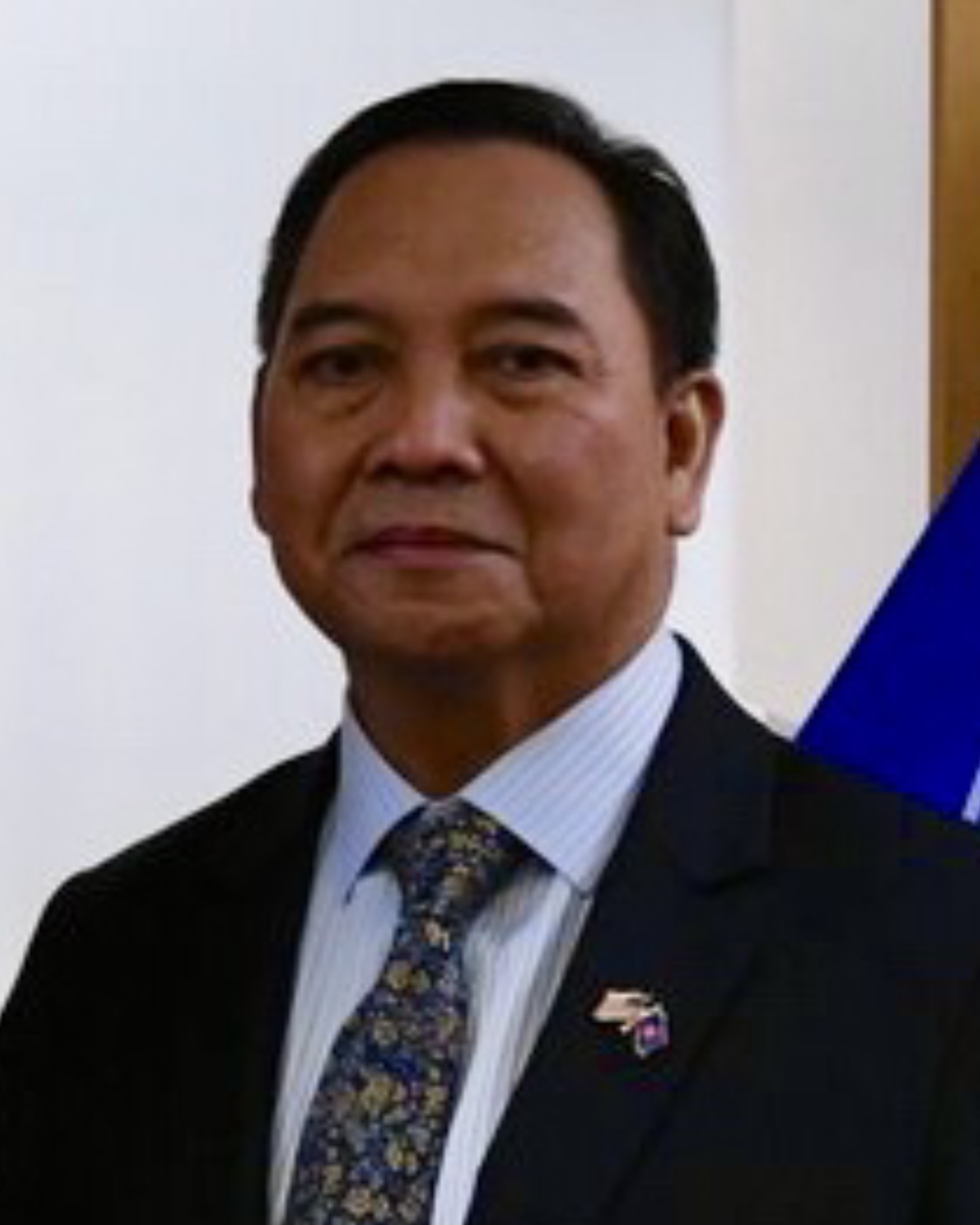
- Incumbent; Serbini Ali since January 28, 2016
- Style: His Excellency
- Appointer: Sultan of Brunei
- Term length: At His Majesty's pleasure
- Inaugural holder: Idris Mohammad
- Formation: March 13, 1984
- Website: Official website

The Bruneian ambassador in Washington, D.C. is the official representative of the Government in Bandar Seri Begawan to the Government of the United States.

== Chronology ==
Representation is as follows (years refer to dates of actual service):

- Resumption of Full Independence: 1984
- Ambassador Extraordinary and Plenipotentiary to the United States: since 1984

== List of ambassadors ==
Diplomatic agrément	Diplomatic accreditation	Ambassador	Observations	Prime Minister of Brunei	President of the United States	Term end
February 16, 1984	March 13, 1984	Pengiran Dato Paduka Haji Idris bin Duli Pengiran Temenggong Pengiran Haji Mohammad	First ambassador of Brunei to the United States. The United States recognized the opening of Brunei Darussalam's in Washington, D.C., in March 1984.	Hassanal Bolkiah	Ronald Reagan	1987
April 22, 1987	May 11, 1987	Dato Paduka Haji Mohammad Suni bin Haji Idris	The ambassador asked the United States investors to form joint ventures in his country in order to diversify its economy in 1988.	Hassanal Bolkiah	Ronald Reagan	1990
February 11, 1991	February 19, 1991	Dato Seri laila Jasa Haji Mohammad Kassim bin Haji Mohammad Daud		Hassanal Bolkiah	George H. W. Bush	1993
November 16, 1993	December 9, 1993	Pehin Orang Kaya Lela Utama Dato Paduka Haji Jaya bin Abdul Latif	From November 18 to 20, 1993, the Sultan attended the APEC meeting in Seattle. Brunei and the United States signed a memorandum of understanding on military defense cooperation on November 29, 1994.	Hassanal Bolkiah	Bill Clinton	1997
March 17, 1997	May 14, 1997	Pengiran Indera Negara Pengiran Anak Haji Puteh ibni Al-Marhum Pengiran Pemancha Pengiran Anak Haji Mohamed Alam	President Bill Clinton paid his first visit to Brunei in November 2000, when he attended the Asia-Pacific Economic Cooperation (APEC) conference. In December 2002, the Sultan made his first state visit to the United States, where he met with former President George W. Bush.	Hassanal Bolkiah	Bill Clinton	2008
October 2, 2009	November 4, 2009	Dato Paduka Haji Yusoff bin Haji Abdul Hamid	Hillary Clinton visited Brunei in September 2012 and met with Prince Mohamed Bolkiah. During an official visit in March 2013, President Barack Obama received the Sultan at the White House.	Hassanal Bolkiah	Barack Obama	2014
January 27, 2016	January 28, 2016	Dato Paduka Haji Serbini bin Haji Ali	From February 16 to 18, 2016, the Sultan attended the ASEAN Leaders Summit in Sunnylands, California.	Hassanal Bolkiah	Barack Obama	incumbent

== Gallery ==
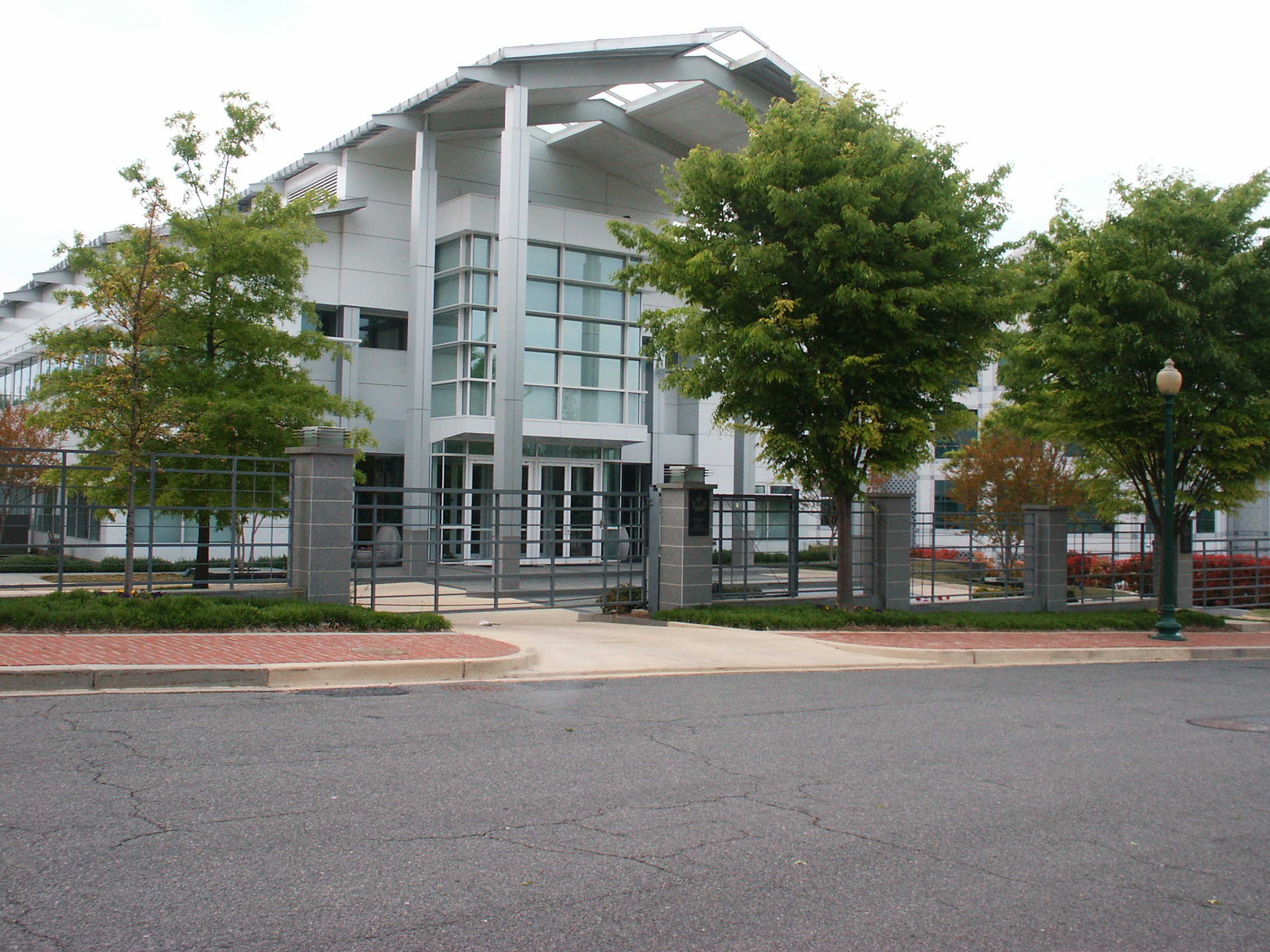
The Brunei Embassy's main gate in 2005

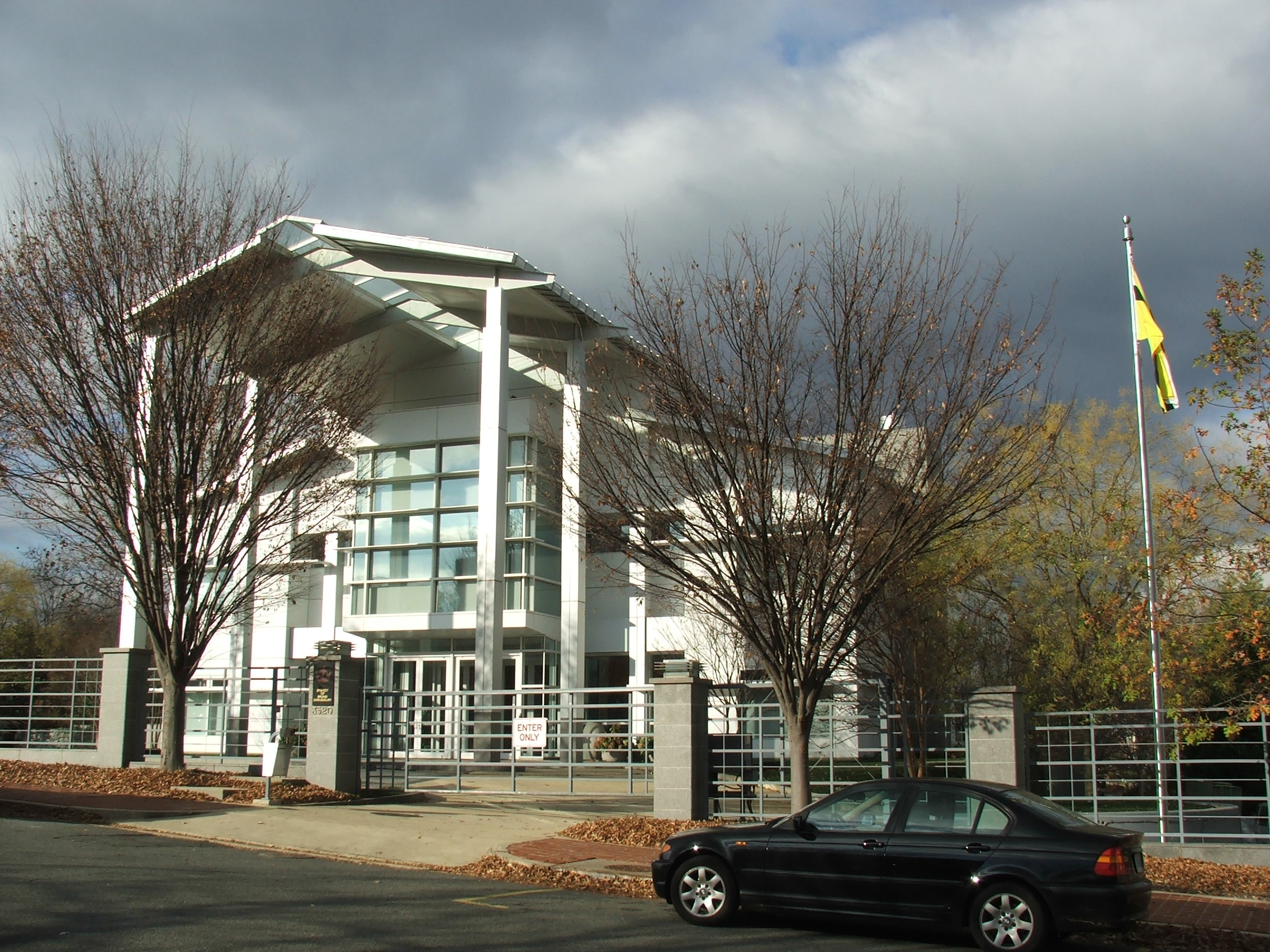
Another angle of the embassy in 2008

== See also ==
- Brunei–United States relations
