= Brunei–Japan relations =

- Brunei: Japan

Diplomatic mission
- Embassy of Brunei, Tokyo: Embassy of Japan, Bandar Seri Begawan

Envoy
- Ambassador Shahbudin Musa: Ambassador Maeda Toru

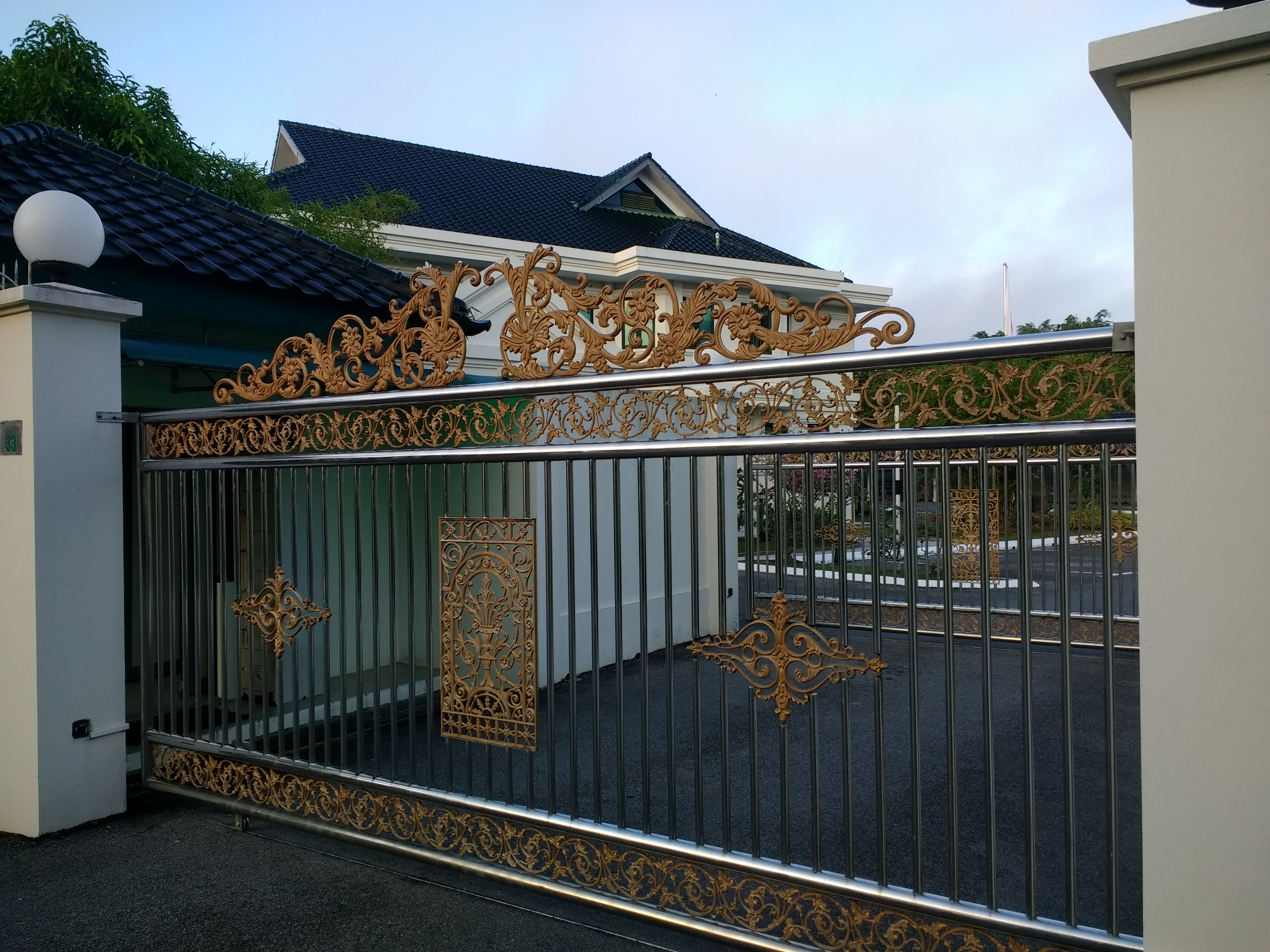
Embassy of Japan in Bandar Seri Begawan

Brunei–Japan relations (Malay: Hubungan Brunei - Jepun, Japanese: 日本とブルネイの関係) refers to bilateral foreign relations between Brunei and Japan. Brunei has an embassy in Tokyo, and Japan has an embassy in Bandar Seri Begawan.

== History ==
Relations has been established since 2 April 1984. Brunei and Japan had a long close and friendly ties especially in economic with Brunei heavily relies on Japan for imports such as motor vehicles, construction equipment, electronic goods and household appliances which dominate the Bruneian market.

== Relations between Brunei Royal Family and Japan Imperial Family ==
The Sultan of Brunei paid a state visit to Japan in April 1984. For the first time in history, the Sultan of Brunei made an audience with Emperor Hirohito at the Tokyo Imperial Palace. During the Sultan's visit, both monarchs had exchanged state honours. The Sultan awarded the Emperor 1st Class - Darjah Kerabat Laila Utama Yang Amat Dihormati - D.K. (Laila Utama) while the Emperor bestowed the Sultan Collar of the Supreme Order of the Chrysanthemum.

The relations between both royal families continue in touch. The Sultan of Brunei attended the funeral of Emperor Hirohito in 1989. A year later, the Sultan attended the coronation of Emperor Akihito on 12 November 1990.

In September 1996 Prince Hitachi and Princess Hitachi visited Brunei. They became the first members of the Imperial Household to visit the sultanate.

On 9 September 2004, among the royal guests who were invited, Crown Prince Naruhito attended the royal wedding of Crown Prince Al-Muhtadee Billah to Pengiran Anak Sarah at Istana Nurul Iman in Bandar Seri Begawan.

On 5 October 2017, on the occasion of the Golden Jubilee of the Sultan of Brunei to the throne, Emperor Akihito and Empress Michiko signed the congratulatory book to convey their warmest congratulations to the Sultan. The signing took place at the Brunei Embassy in Tokyo.

== Economic relations ==
Several agreements such as the Japan–Brunei Economic Partnership and avoidance of tax has been signed. In oil and gas industry, over 82% Bruneian liquefied natural gas (LNG) were sold to Japan and Brunei provides over 5 million tons of the LNG per year to three Japanese utilities. Japanese companies have been active in investing in Brunei and were planning on new projects in other areas such as on petrochemicals and halal food. Both countries also seek co-operation in the field of renewable energy and in energy saving, and keen to expand relations in education, agriculture and health.

== Security relations ==
On security, the Japanese Prime Minister Shinzō Abe said that Japan would exert every effort toward the success of multilateral exercises under the ASEAN Defense Ministers Meeting Plus which were held in Brunei on 2013. Both Brunei and Japan confirmed that they would continue strengthening cooperative relations in the fields of disaster relief and maritime security.
