= Labuan Clock Tower =

Clock tower in Victoria, Labuan, Malaysia

Coordinates: 5°16′33″N 115°15′17″E

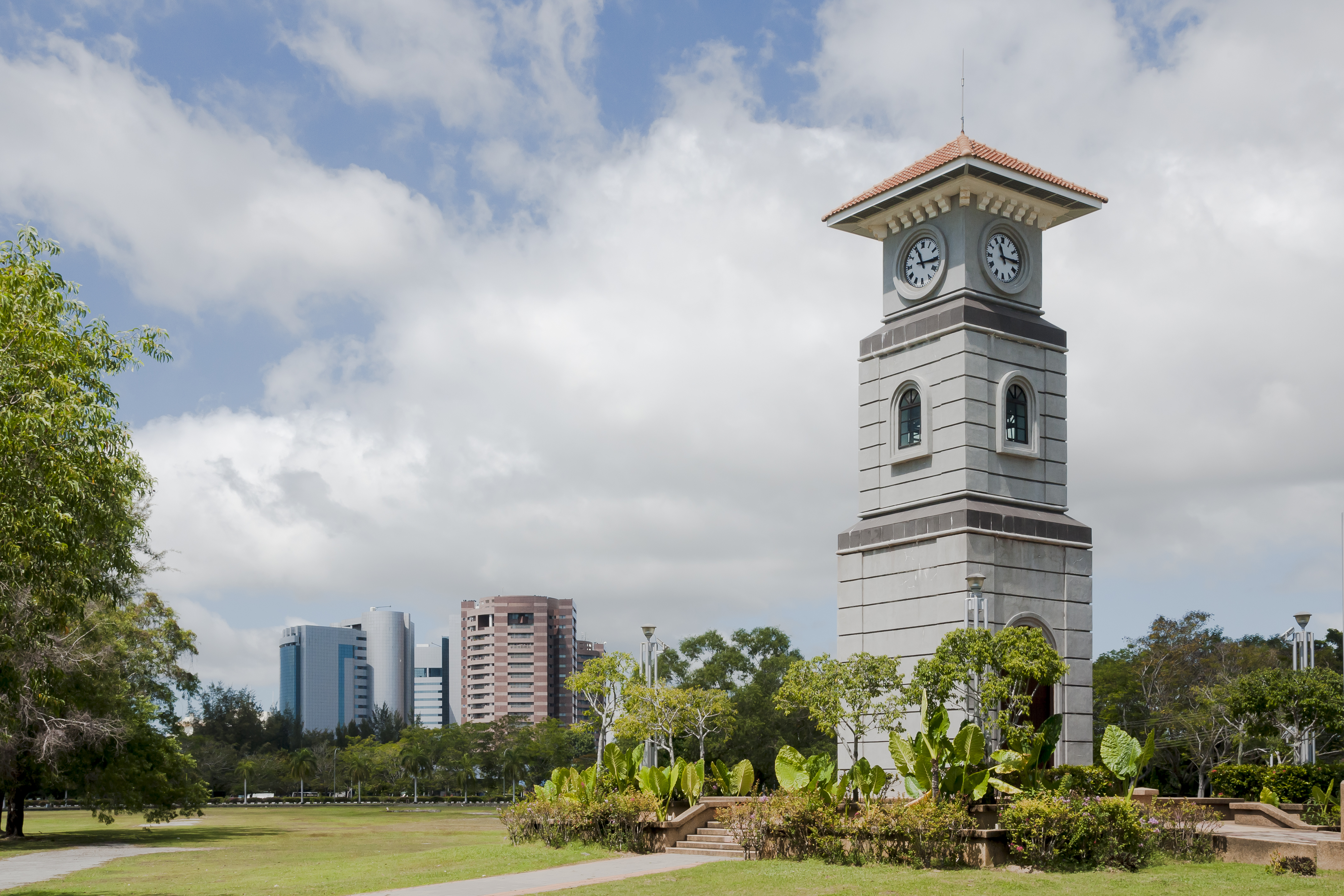
- Location: Jalan Tanjung Purun, Victoria, Federal Territory of Labuan, Malaysia
- Built for: Chee Swee Cheng in 1906
- Demolished: 1948
- Rebuilt: 2002 by Malaysian Ministry of Tourism

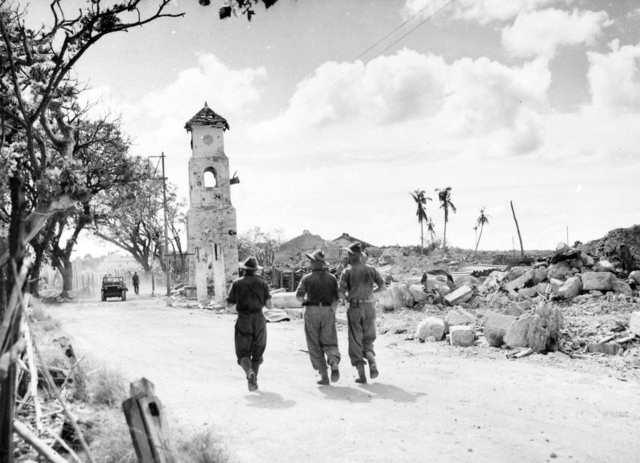
Remains of the original clock tower on 26 June 1945 after heavy bombing by Allied forces.

Labuan Clock Tower is situated in Victoria, Federal Territory of Labuan, Malaysia. It is a replica of an earlier clock tower built in the early 20th century which was one of the few surviving structures after the town was bombed during the Second World War, and later demolished.

== History ==
The original clock tower, built in 1906, was constructed in honour of Chee Swee Cheng, a wealthy businessman and philanthropist from Malacca who was closely connected with the development of Labuan and British North Borneo, who resided there for many years. He donated funds to the government of Labuan for the construction when he resigned from the British protectorate.

During the Second World War, it was one of only three standing structures that survived Allied bombing of Victoria during the Battle of Labuan in 1945. In 1948, the British administration demolished the clock tower.

In 2002, the Labuan Corporation reconstructed the clock tower as an exact replica of the original clock tower with funds provided by the Malaysian Ministry of Tourism.
