= Jack's Place =

Jack's Place may refer to:

- Jack's Place (restaurant), Singapore restaurant chain
- Jack's Place (TV series), an American drama series
