= Heeren Building =

Building in Singapore

- The Hereen Building in 1980
- Interactive map of the Heeren Building area

General information
- Architectural style: pseudo-Classical style
- Coordinates: 1.3025°N 103.8373°E
- Completed: 1931
- Demolished: March 1990

Design and construction
- Architecture firm: Keys and Dowdeswell

The Heeren Building was a building built on the corner of Orchard Road and Cairnhill Road in Singapore in 1931. It was demolished in 1990 due to a road realignment project.

== Architecture ==
The building was three-storeys tall and built in a pseudo-Classical style. It featured long cantilevered balconies and strong cornice, similar to Capitol Theatre, which was designed by the same architectural firm. "Torches" could be found on the building's roof. The building was named after Heeren Street in Malacca.

The building's ground floor housed shops, while offices and apartments could be found on the building's upper floors. At the time of the building's demolition, six shops occupied the building's ground floor, including the Heeren Beauty Salon, the Beethoven Record House, the Ali Joo Fur Salon and the Seng Hup Electric Company. The building also housed the offices of High Society Escort and Hostess Service, as well as 11 families.

== History ==
The Heeren Building was built by Chinese businessman Chee Swee Cheng on the corner of Orchard Road and Cairnhill Road in 1931. The building was designed by Chinese architectural firm Keys & Dowdeswell.

Plans to demolish the building for the widening of Cairnhill Road and Grange Road were first announced in 1989. The building was demolished in March 1990. The pre-war shophouses linking the Heeren Building with the Yen San Building were demolished and replaced by The Heeren, which was completed in 1997 and was named after the Heeren Building. The owners of The Heeren installed the "torches" of the Heeren Building on the rear end of The Heeren.
