= Ibrahim Mohammad Jahfar =

Bruneian civil servant and magistrate (1902–1971)

Yang Dimuliakan Lagi Dihormati Pehin Datu Perdana Manteri Dato Laila Utama Ibrahim Mohammad Jahfar DK SPMB CBE DSNB POAS PHBS PJK
- إبراهيم محمد جهفر
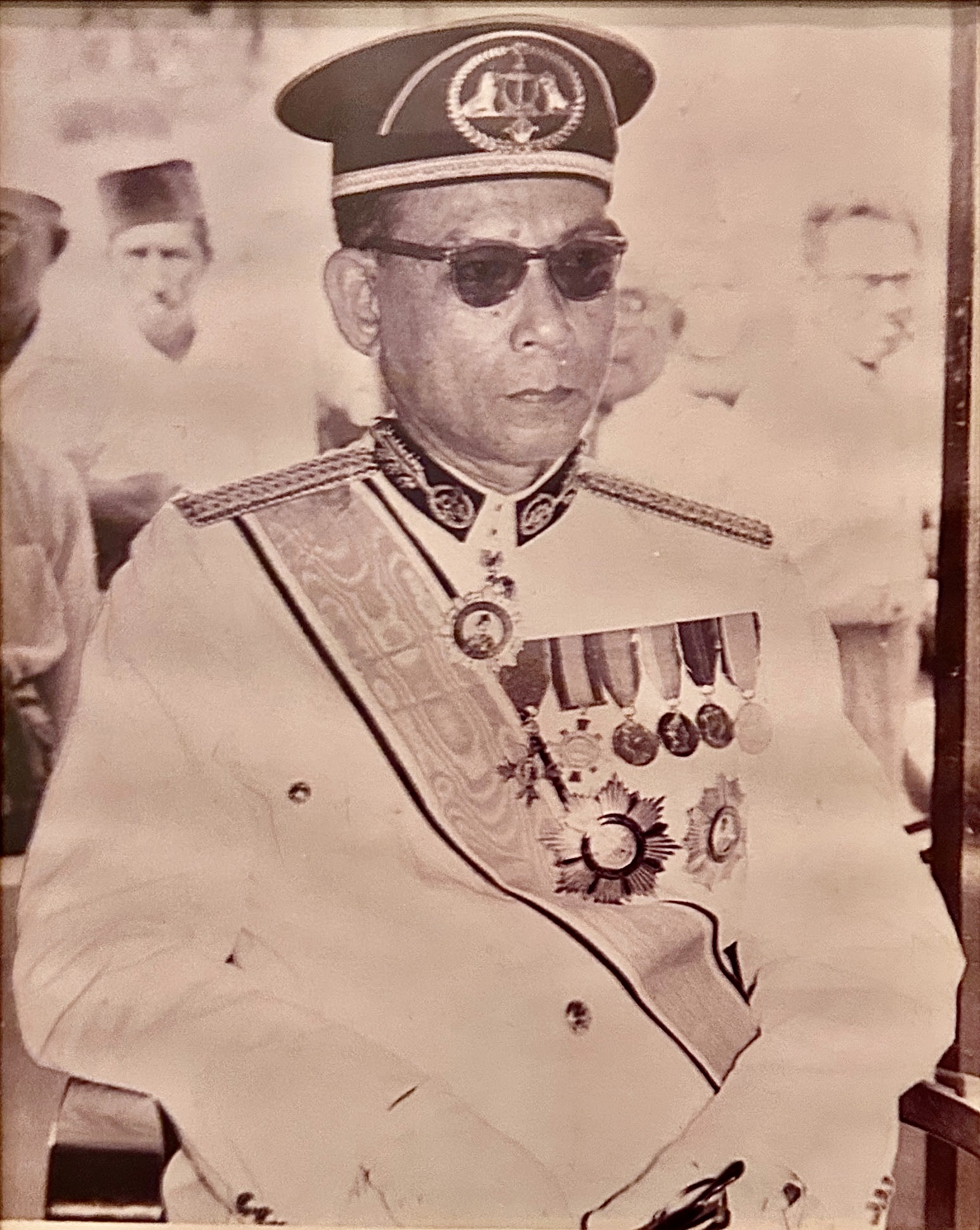
- Ibrahim in 1959

3rd Speaker of the Legislative Council of Brunei
- In office 31 January 1965 – 19 February 1971
- Monarchs: Omar Ali Saifuddien III; Hassanal Bolkiah
- Menteri Besar: Marsal Maun; Pengiran Muhammad Yusuf
- Succeeded by: Pengiran Anak Mohamed Alam
- In office June 1963 – 30 January 1965
- Preceded by: Pengiran Muhammad Ali

1st Menteri Besar of Brunei
- In office 29 September 1959 – 1 August 1962
- Preceded by: Position established
- Succeeded by: Marsal Maun

State Secretary of Brunei
- In office 1941–1945
- Monarch: Ahmad Tajuddin
- Preceded by: Office established
- Succeeded by: Wan Ahmad Umar

Personal details
- Born: 27 September 1902 Crown Colony of Labuan
- Died: 19 February 1971 (aged 68) Brunei General Hospital, Bandar Seri Begawan, Brunei
- Resting place: Kianggeh Dagang Cemetery, Bandar Seri Begawan, Brunei
- Spouse: Saadiah Tahir (m. 1923)
- Children: 4; including Abbas Al-Sufri and Isa
- Relatives: Ahmad Isa (grandson); Musa Adnin (grandson)
- Occupation: Civil servant; magistrate

Ibrahim bin Mohammad Jahfar (27 September 1902 – 19 February 1971) was an aristocrat, civil servant and magistrate. He was the first Malay to hold Brunei's highest executive position, serving as state secretary from 1941 to 1945. He also served as private secretary to Sultan Omar Ali Saifuddien III from 1951 to 1959 and as the country's first menteri besar (chief minister) from 1959 to 1962. Furthermore, he was appointed speaker of the Legislative Council of Brunei (LegCo) in 1963, a position he held until his death in 1971.

Ibrahim's contributions during the Pacific War were significant, especially in preventing the British and Japanese governments from undermining each other. As state secretary under Japanese occupation, he understood Japan's tactics and worked to protect Brunei from falling under British control. He played a crucial role in safeguarding vital documents, preventing Japan from destroying them in a time of desperation. Ibrahim also protected many innocent lives from becoming victims of Japanese executions. According to British Resident John Peel in 1947, Ibrahim's foresight and timely actions preserved important government documents, greatly aiding Brunei's post-war recovery and civil government restoration. He was also a key figure during the negotiations for Brunei's 1959 constitution.

== Early life and education ==
Ibrahim bin Mohammad Jahfar was born in Labuan on 27 September 1902 (Note: According to Pelita Brunei in 1971, he was born on Friday, 17 September 1900.) into a family of mixed Malay, Chinese and Indian heritage. His father, Mohammad Jahfar (also known as Tengku Mohd Jahfar), was the son of Tengku Mohd. Saat, who had settled in Penang and became a successful businessman, relinquishing his royal title. (Note: Tengku Mohd. Saat, fled from Johor to Penang due to a family dispute, possibly related to his marriage to a Chinese woman. To conceal his identity, he abandoned his royal title and gave his children ordinary names. However, the family occasionally reflected on their Johor roots. As a token of their lineage, Tengku Merandeh passed down a keris to Tengku Mohd. Saat, who then gave it to his son Mohd. Jahfar. The keris was later inherited by Ibrahim and eventually passed on to his eldest son.) Mohd. Jahfar married Siti Rafeah binti Laut in the 1890s, and they had four children: Norsiah, Ismail, Ibrahim, and Che Sariba (Habibi). His mother's father, Laut, was of Riau descent and worked as a surveyor after moving to Labuan in the 1870s, while her mother, Mariam, was of Madras descent. Ibrahim's family lineage traces back to Tengku Merandeh, who was linked to Johor's royal family, though the exact connection remains unclear.

His father, Mohd. Jahfar, taught him to read and write, encouraged him to study English at home, and nurtured his love for books, especially history. While working at Kebun Lumada as a clerk and store supervisor, he took English lessons from A. V. Lingam, a Jaffnese ethnic descendant. He later worked as a dresser for six months before moving to Kebun Sapong, where he continued learning English. In early 1914, he relocated to Jesselton and Kinarut with his cousin Md. Ariff before following his uncle, Abdul Razak, to Labuan in April 1914. There, he attended S.P.G. English School for two years, completing standard V. His academic success earned him a $90 scholarship from a Chinese merchant, Chee Swee Cheng, and additional prizes from Geoffrey Cator, the British Resident of Labuan.

== Career ==
=== Early career ===
Ibrahim was stationed at Kebun Lumada, where he worked as a clerk, documenting the workers' daily tasks and managing the store. He also seized the opportunity to learn English from A. V. Lingam. Following this, he worked as a dresser for six months and, in June 1917, accompanied Geoffrey Cator, the British Resident of Labuan, to Brunei. He then trained in the finance department before transferring to the customs department, where he served as a clerk until January 1918.

His work caught the attention of Cator, who recognised his intelligence and proficiency in English. As a result, on 27 January 1918, Ibrahim was sent to Singapore for further training. He sailed on the "Selangor" and arrived in Singapore on 4 February 1918, where he trained at the Auditor-General's Office for a year. After completing his training, he returned to Brunei on 6 December 1918. Upon his return, he was appointed assistant clerk in the Brunei postal services until 31 December 1918. On 1 January 1919, he was promoted to clerk of correspondence at the British Resident and Land Office. From March to April 1922, he led a delegation to Singapore to represent Brunei at the Borneo and Malaya Exhibition.

On 1 May 1923, Ibrahim was appointed as a government visitor, although the exact nature of the role is unclear. On 1 November 1928, his appointment as a rubber inspector was cancelled, but he continued as a senior administrative officer at the British Resident's Office. On 28 March 1930, he became assistant land revenue collector, and in January 1932, he was appointed class I administrative officer. On 22 June 1932, he became magistrate for the Brunei and Muara Districts (modern-day Brunei–Muara District). After the retirement of Pengiran Shahbandar Pengiran Anak Hashim on 10 July 1932, Ibrahim replaced him as district officer for Brunei and Muara until 1 January 1936. Following this, he became the private secretary to British Resident Roland Evelyn Turnbull.

=== Japanese occupation of Brunei ===
His father, Mohd Jahfar, died at his home on Jalan Stoney, Kampong Sumbiling, in Brunei Town on Wednesday, 19 February 1941, at 3:40 pm. (Note: His father had suffered from chronic nephritis and cystitis for about two years.) Following the Japanese invasion in December 1941, Ibrahim was appointed as the chief administrative officer. With the consent of Sultan Ahmad Tajuddin, Brunei and northern Borneo were placed under the Japanese military rule. Ibrahim played a crucial role in maintaining administrative operations, working closely with local civil servants to facilitate a smooth transition, while most European officials, including the British Resident, were interned at the Batu Lintang camp in Kuching.

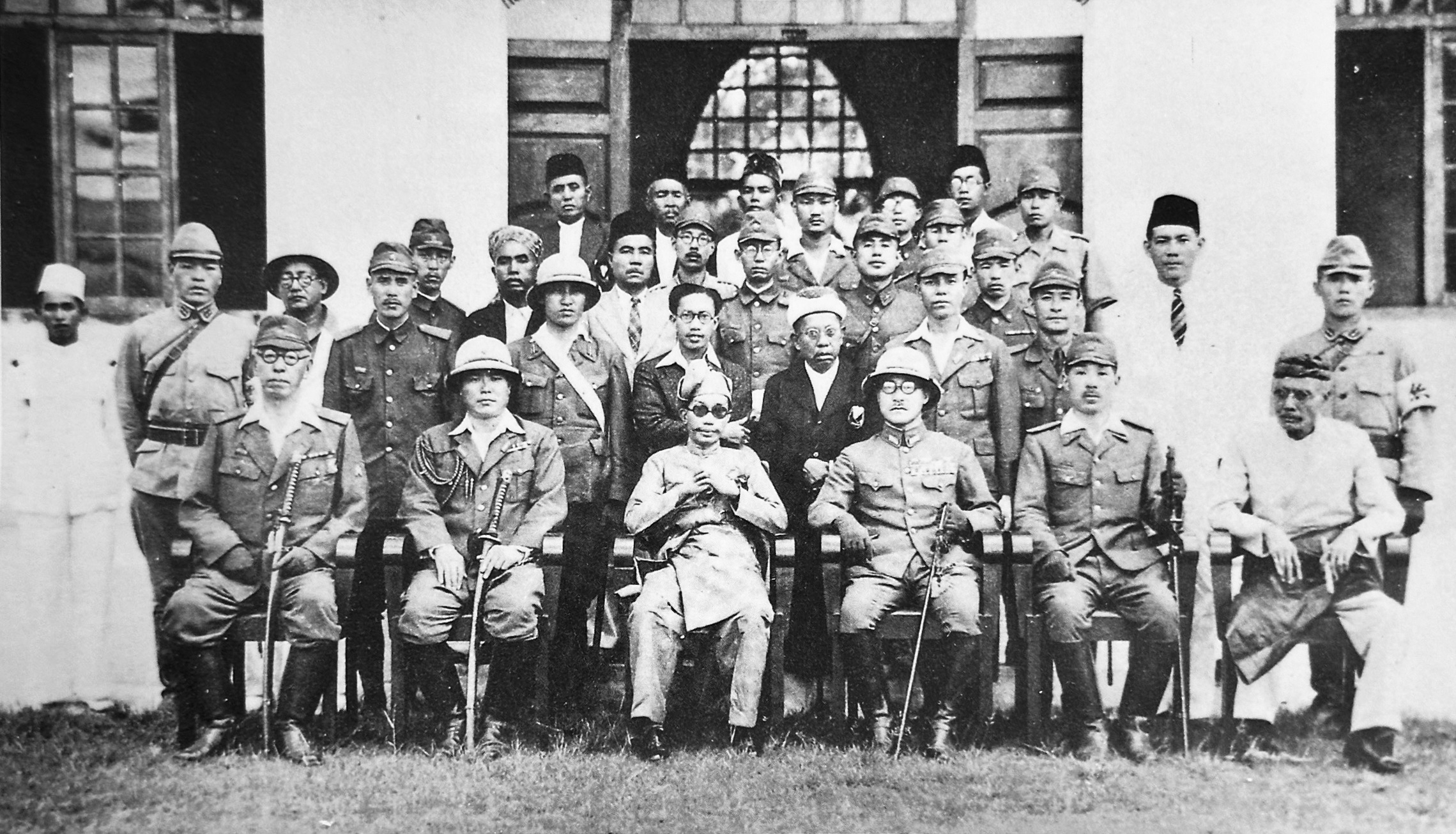
Ibrahim (standing in the second row, second from the right) with Japanese soldiers and administrators between 1941 and 1943

On 28 April 1942, Ibrahim was appointed to the State Council, becoming the first Malay to hold the highest executive position since the British Resident's rule when he was named state secretary. In this role, he assumed all the duties of the British Resident, overseeing the council, which remained under Japanese control. While the council was nominally in charge of Brunei during the occupation, the Japanese provincial governor, similar to the British Resident, closely monitored his activities. Ibrahim took crucial steps to protect important records, such as council papers and land grants, which were at risk of being destroyed by both British and Japanese forces. Although comprehensive historical materials from this period are scarce, his efforts played a significant role in preserving vital records. Ibrahim willingly accepted the consequences of his defiance, saving the Land Grant Registration Book and other documents that the authorities had ordered to be burned. He concealed them in a secret location and later handed them over securely to the government after the liberation of Brunei.

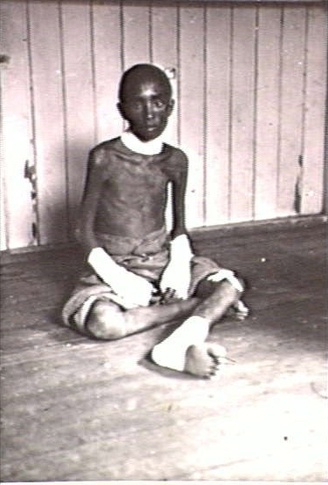
A Brunei Malay prisoner of war, captured by the Japanese, photographed in 1945

Ibrahim often had to make difficult decisions to protect the people of Brunei, even when it meant opposing Japanese orders to prevent harm to the local population. Despite the lack of clear regulations under Japanese rule, he continued his duties with unwavering principles, much like during his time under the British Resident, earning respect from some Japanese officers. He was frequently consulted for solutions to challenges, as he believed Japanese orders should be followed in emergencies but harmful ones should be avoided, given their lack of knowledge of Brunei. His actions left a lasting impact, particularly on those spared from Japanese cruelty. Ibrahim became a key figure for local officials, mentoring them on administration and legal matters, including Prince Omar Ali Saifuddien, who studied criminal and civil law under his guidance.

Ibrahim's dedication to his duties was recognised by Japanese officers after he met with them in Lumapas. Rumours of his death spread, possibly to prevent further action by the Japanese, but the Australian Army had already landed in Muara on 10 June 1945. On 11 June, he heard cannon fire while in Lumapas and met with Kiyotake Kawaguchi and Tamaki, who informed him of a planned relocation to Limbang. He requested a delay due to his health and family's illness. After receiving provisions, he returned to Brunei, stopping along the way and arriving home at 9 p.m. Despite his poor health, he assisted the Australians, being the first called for discussions due to his deep knowledge of Brunei's affairs. However, he retired in 1946 due to his health, spending time recuperating. He started a business supplying goods to British Malayan Petroleum Company in Seria. Though his business grew, it did not yield large profits due to his honest approach. Despite being viewed as a businessman, he continued to be consulted by the British Resident for his expertise in administrative matters.

=== Private secretary and the constitution ===
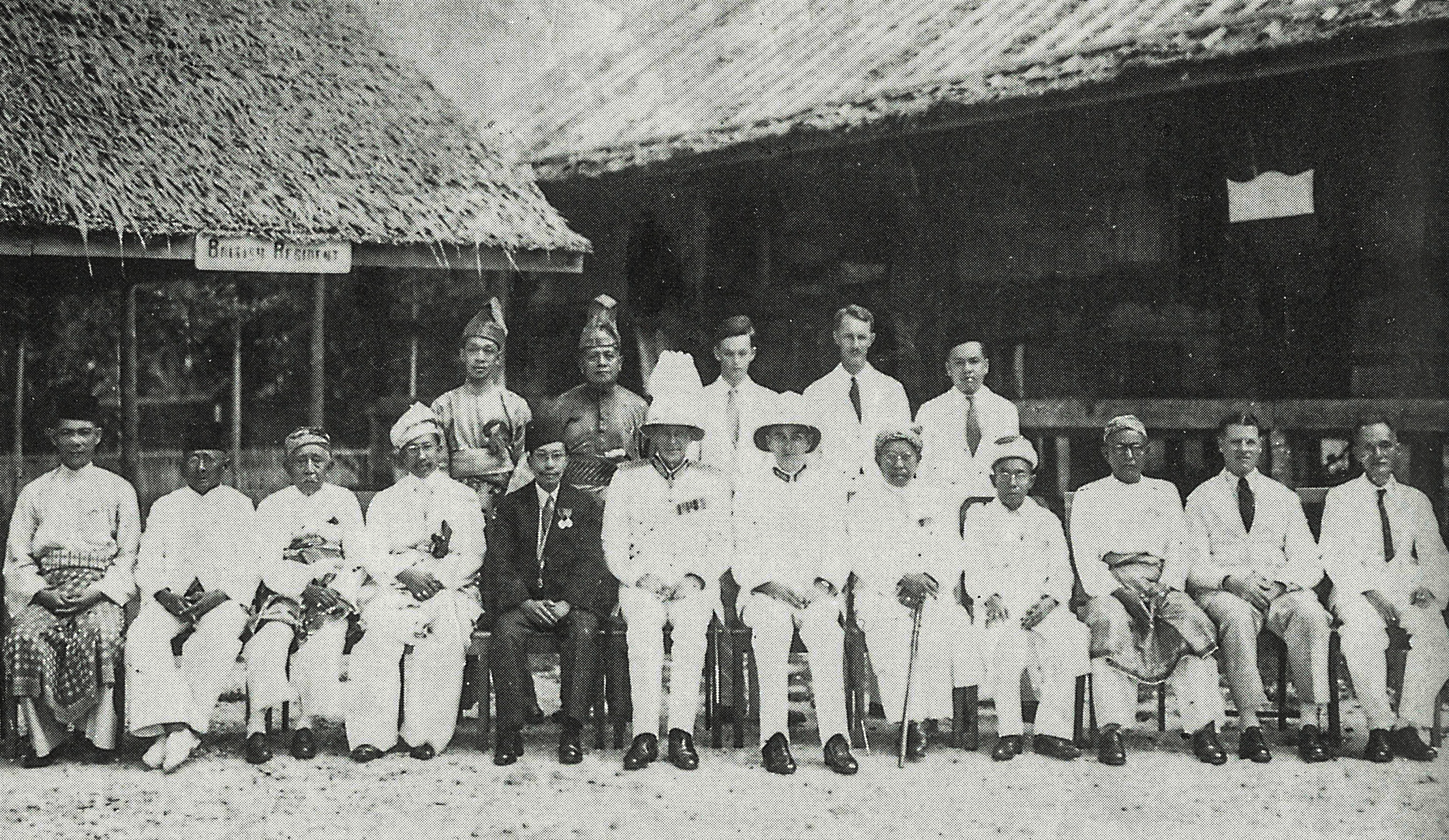
Ibrahim (seated first from the left) outside the British Resident's office during the farewell ceremony for British Resident Peel in 1948

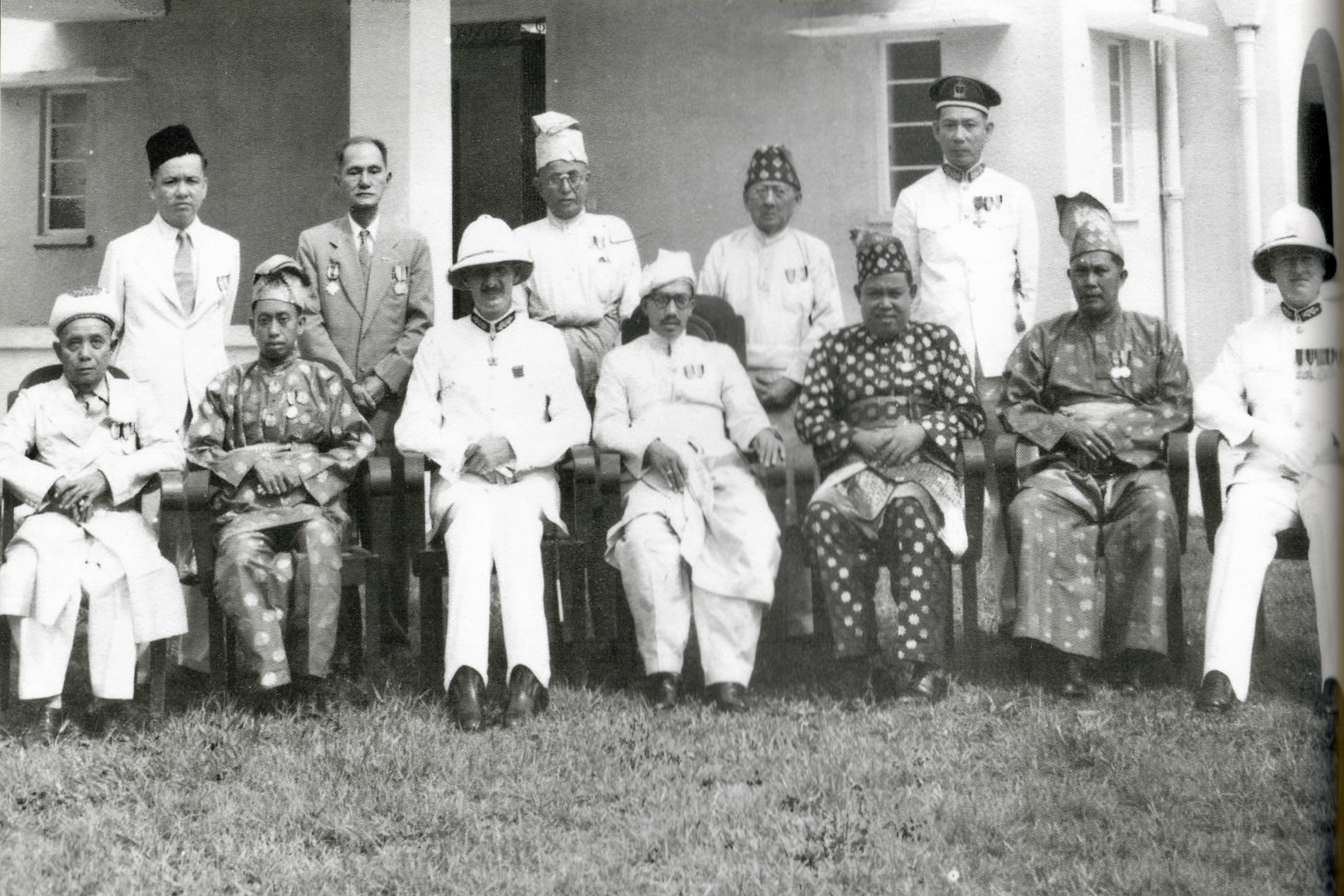
Ibrahim (standing first from the right) at the Lapau alongside fellow State Council members in 1951

After Sultan Omar Ali Saifuddin III ascended to the throne on 4 June 1950, following the passing of his brother Sultan Ahmad Tajuddin, he appointed Ibrahim as his private secretary. Ibrahim gladly accepted, putting an end to his business ventures as he was committed to fully dedicating himself to any task he undertook. In 1951, following his receipt of the title Pehin Datu Perdana Manteri, Ibrahim accompanied the sultan on the hajj pilgrimage. During this time, he played a crucial role in defusing a diplomatic incident when the sultan, in an interview with the Singapore Straits Times, inadvertently renewed Brunei's claim to Limbang and Labuan Island. This sparked tensions with Sarawak and North Borneo, but Ibrahim took responsibility for the statement, explaining that it was made solely to recount Brunei’s historical loss of the territories. His intervention helped ease the situation, with Malcolm MacDonald clarifying the matter to the authorities.

In February 1953, Ibrahim represented Brunei at the Commonwealth Parliamentary Association meeting in Jesselton, despite Brunei not being a member. He also attended the first Sarawak–North Borneo–Brunei Conference in Kuching on 21 February 1953, aimed at improving consultation and cooperation between the three territories on common matters. As the influence of the State Council grew, Ibrahim played a key role in scrutinising British-proposed legislation, leveraging both his influence and the sultan's support to ensure the council, largely filled with the sultan's nominees, was pivotal in Brunei's political developments.

A significant moment came in April 1953 when Ibrahim, as a member of the State Council and private secretary to the sultan, opposed the State Treasurer Incorporation Enactment introduced by the British administration. He argued that the enactment would grant excessive discretion to the treasurer and proposed that financial matters be debated by the sultan-in-council instead. His opposition led to the defeat of the enactment, with only the British Resident and treasurer in support, preserving the status quo. This victory marked a turning point, positioning the council as a centre of political conflict and signalling the decline of British authority in Brunei. Later in June, he joined the sultan for the coronation of Elizabeth II and subsequently toured Europe.

Ibrahim became the interpreter in Brunei's constitutional talks, contributing significantly to the discussions. When the draft proposals were presented on 17 December 1954, he facilitated communication between the sultan, British officials, and his wazirs—including the Pengiran Bendahara and Pengiran Pemancha. He was instrumental in ensuring that everyone involved fully understood the talks and proposed amendments. In December 1955, Ibrahim was appointed head of the Select Committee formed to review the Local Councils Bill. Under his leadership, the committee proposed creating six local councils—two Urban District Councils and four Rural District Councils—for the state's six localities. Their recommendations, with a suggested implementation date of 1 July 1956, were submitted in January 1956. During the critical stages of the 1956 constitutional talks, the sultan exercised strategic restraint, keeping key decisions—including the appointment of Ibrahim as the first chief minister—closely guarded. This approach helped prevent internal strife and ensured that neither the Partai Rakyat Brunei (PRB) nor British officials could exploit the situation, allowing the constitutional process to proceed smoothly.

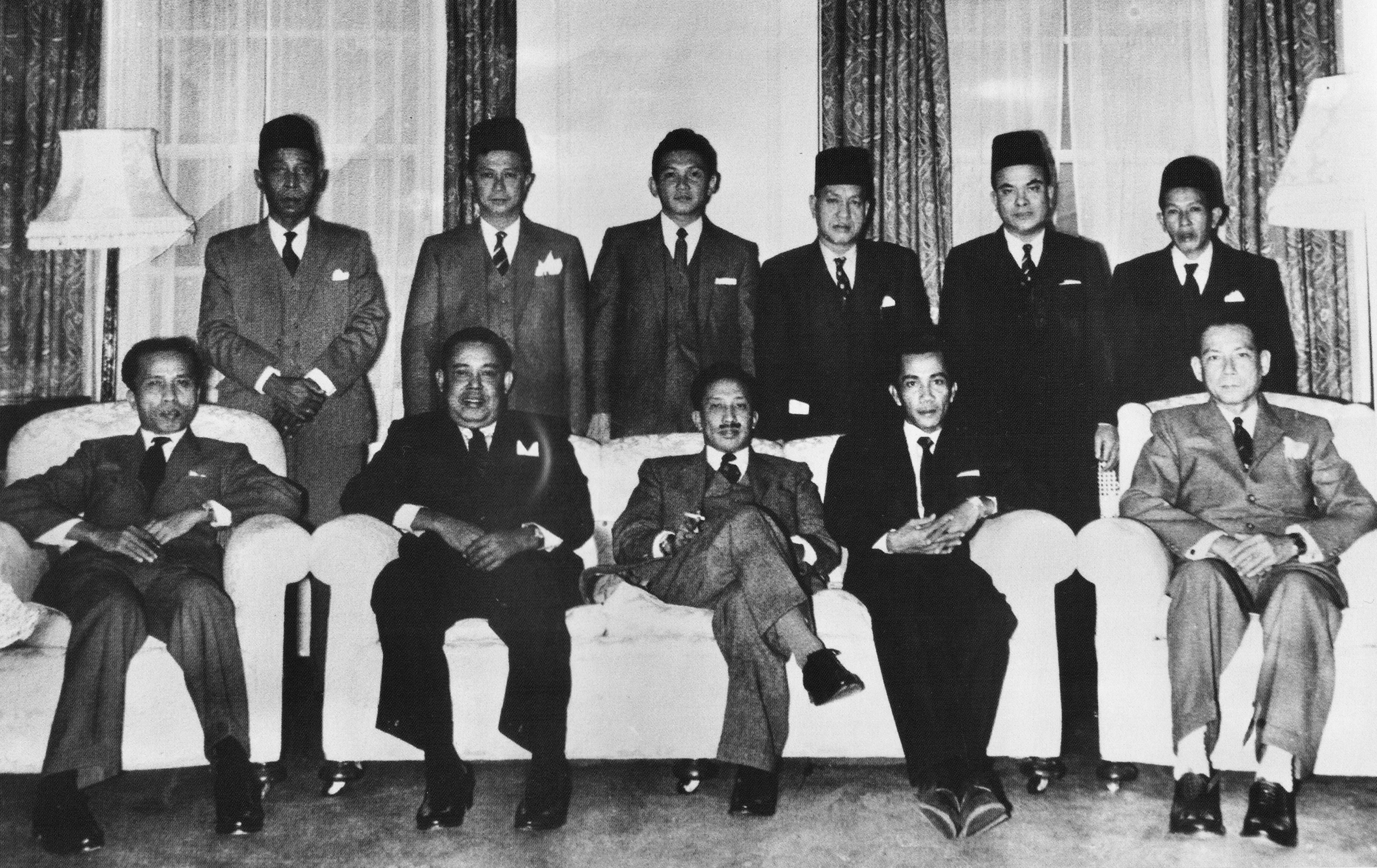
Ibrahim (seated first from the right) with the 1959 constitutional delegation in London

In 1957, Ibrahim led Brunei's delegation to the ECAFE conference in Bangkok. Later that year, in September, he accompanied the sultan to London for talks on Brunei's constitutional proposals, which were of great significance to the negotiations with the Colonial Office. His inclusion in the delegation, alongside key advisers, underscored his pivotal role in the discussions. He had also served as the chairman of the Select Committee that drafted the Local Government proposals the previous year.

Ibrahim accompanied Brunei's delegation to London in 1959 for constitutional talks, which were once again headed by the sultan. As a representative of the Malay members of the State Council, he was actively involved in discussions on crucial issues, including the transition of power from the British Resident to a chief minister, nationality and election qualifications, defence, and the high commissioner's reserve powers. Ibrahim enhanced his influence by serving as deputy chairman of the Brunei delegation during the London Conference in March 1959, working closely with other representatives and legal advisers to negotiate key constitutional matters with the Colonial Office.

=== Chief minister of Brunei ===
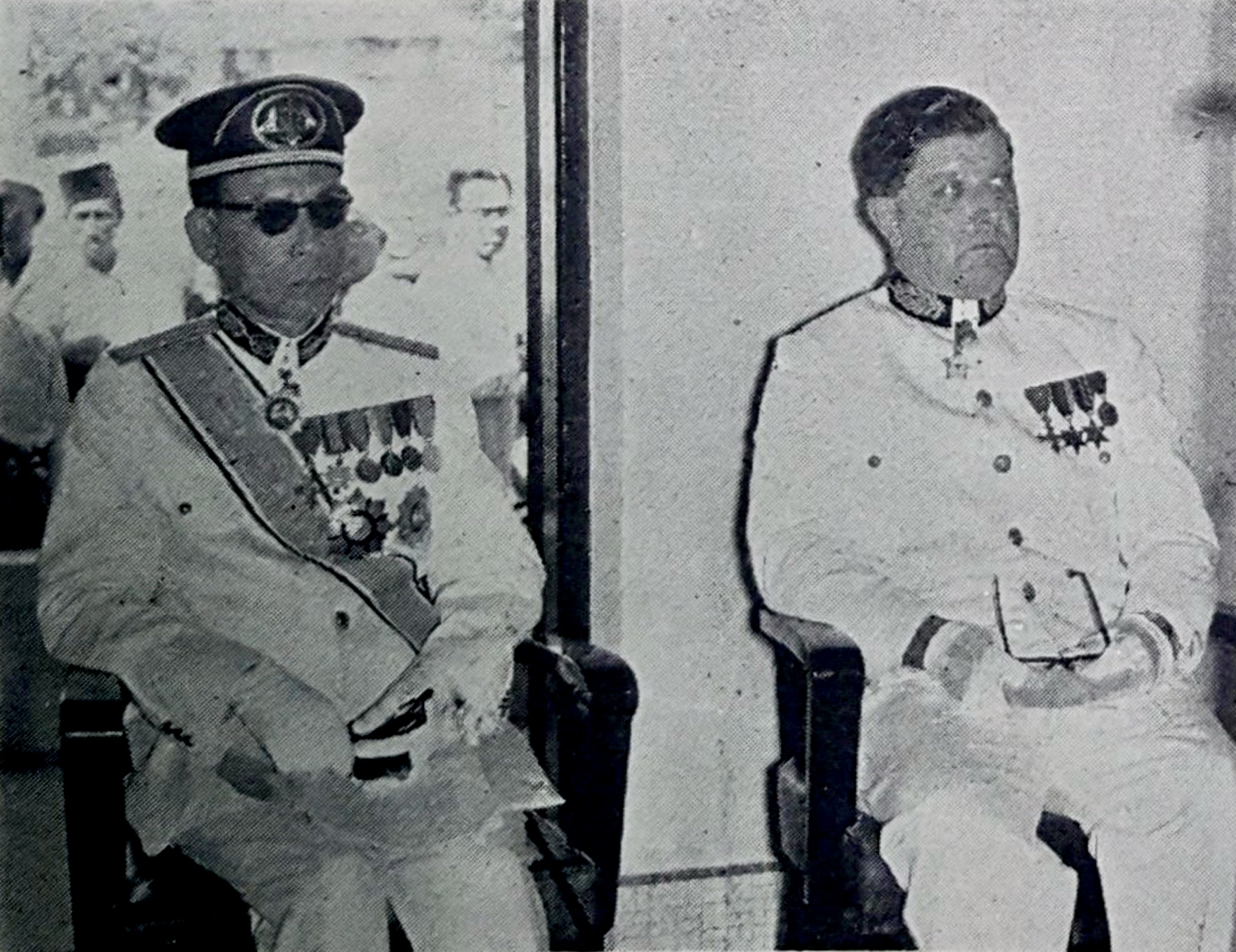
Ibrahim (left) alongside Dennis White (right) during the signing of Brunei's constitution in 1959

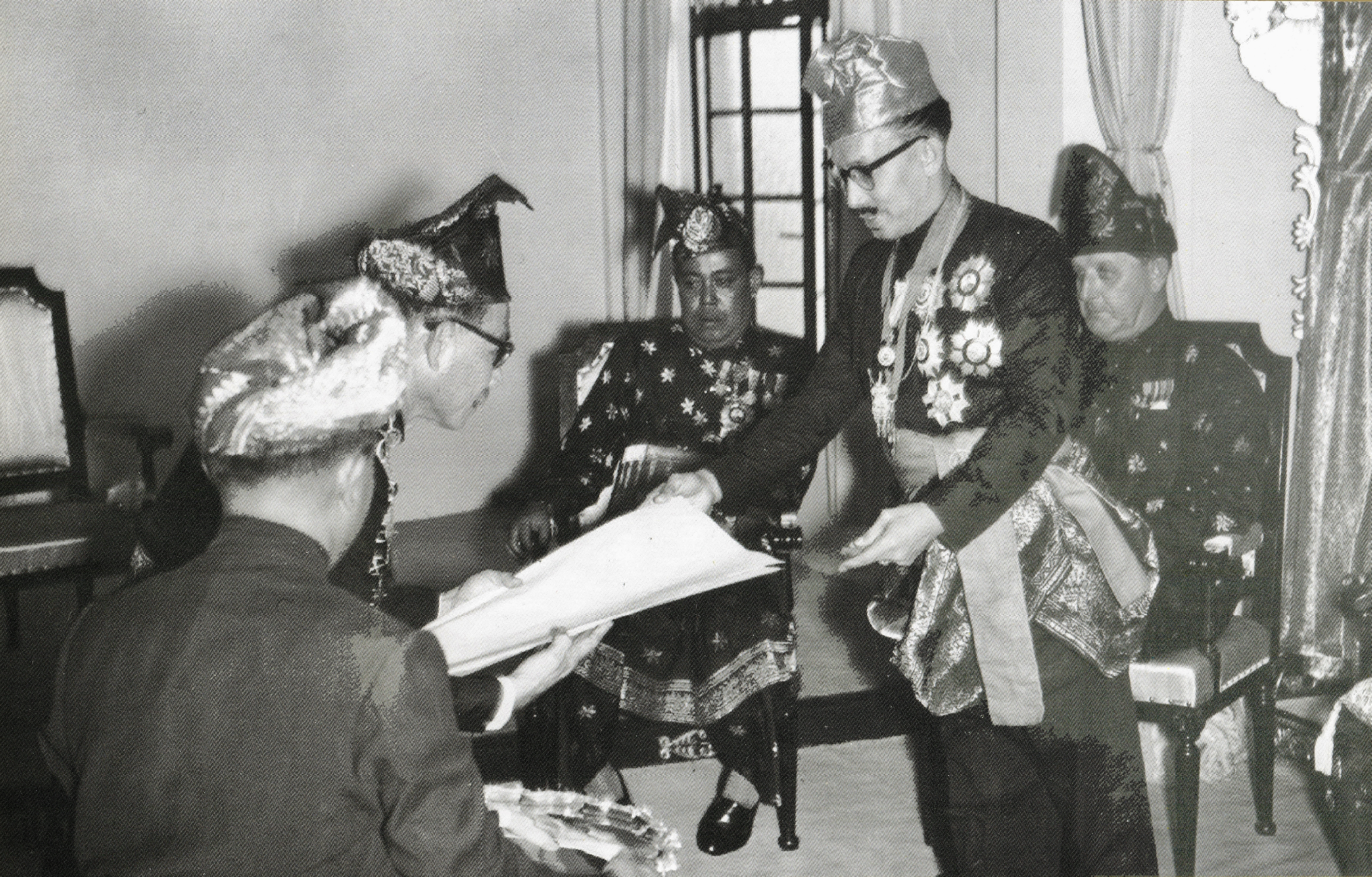
The ceremony for the appointment of Ibrahim as chief minister in 1959

As the private secretary to the sultan, Ibrahim provided advice for Brunei's progress, including proposing a five-year development plan and suggesting the creation of a written constitution, which was officially declared on 29 September 1959. He attended the signing of the constitution and the new agreement with the United Kingdom at the Lapau on the same day, becoming the first to review the administrative sections of the Bruneian constitution. He was also appointed as Brunei's first chief minister after the sultan's unsuccessful search for a candidate in Malaya. Although not considered a "true Brunei Malay" due to his Labuan origins, Ibrahim was favoured by the British for his extensive administrative experience, and his appointment was approved by the Secretary of State for the Colonies, Alan Lennox-Boyd, in June 1959. However, the formal transition was delayed due to unresolved constitutional and staffing issues, and despite the constitution granting supreme power to the sultan, Ibrahim was not granted authority as chief minister.

His selection, particularly alongside Wan Ahmad Umar's as state secretary, surprised many in Brunei, especially members of the sultan's constitutional delegation. Local elites resented Ibrahim's appointment, viewing it as the sultan’s attempt to choose the only "local" candidate acceptable to the British. Some members of the State Council were disappointed, as they had hoped the position would be filled by a "true Brunei Malay." This dissatisfaction was further compounded by frustration over the appointment of British and Malayan officials to other high-ranking positions. Despite the constitution granting supreme power to the sultan, he ultimately chose not to delegate authority to Ibrahim as chief minister.

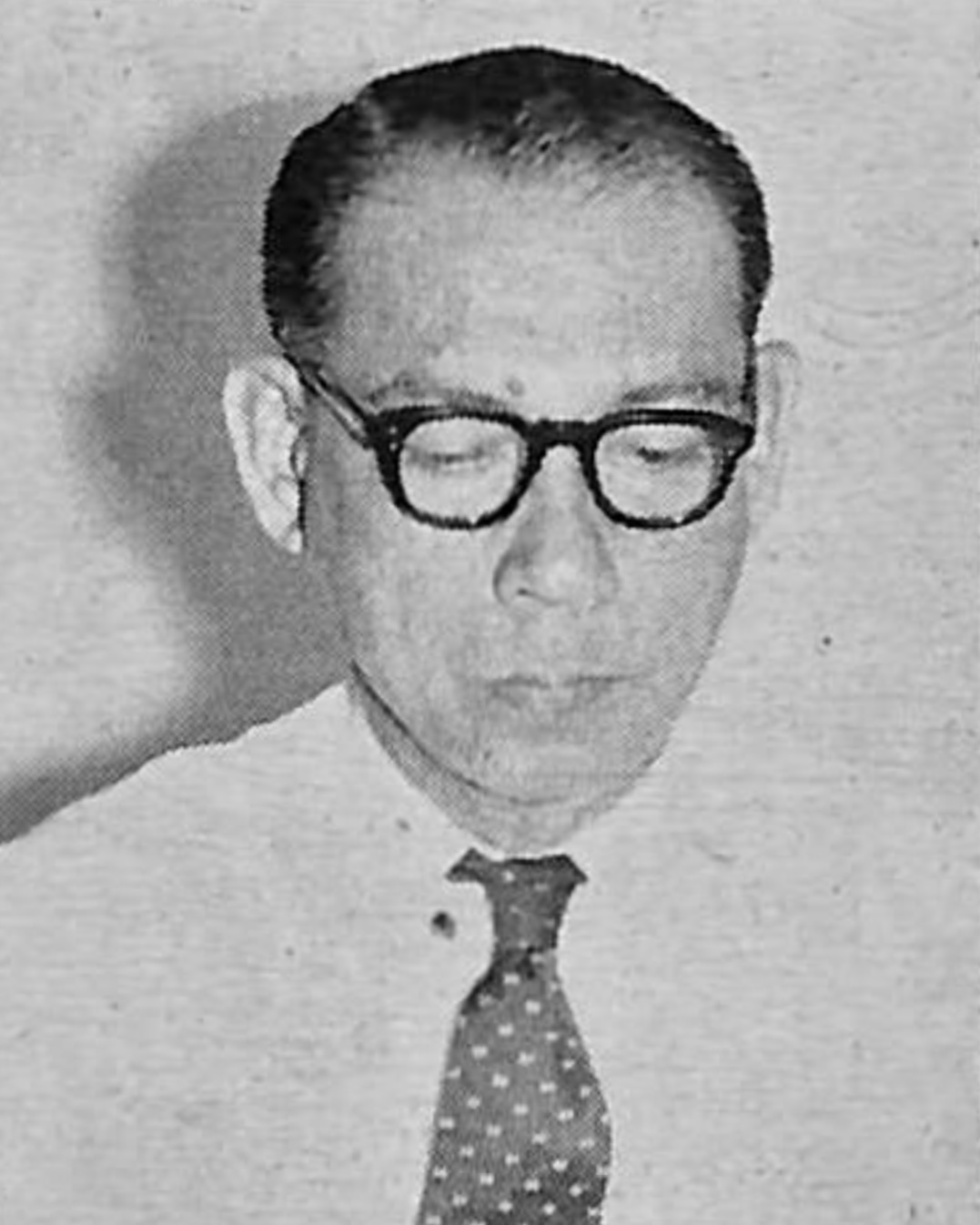
Ibrahim, c. 1960

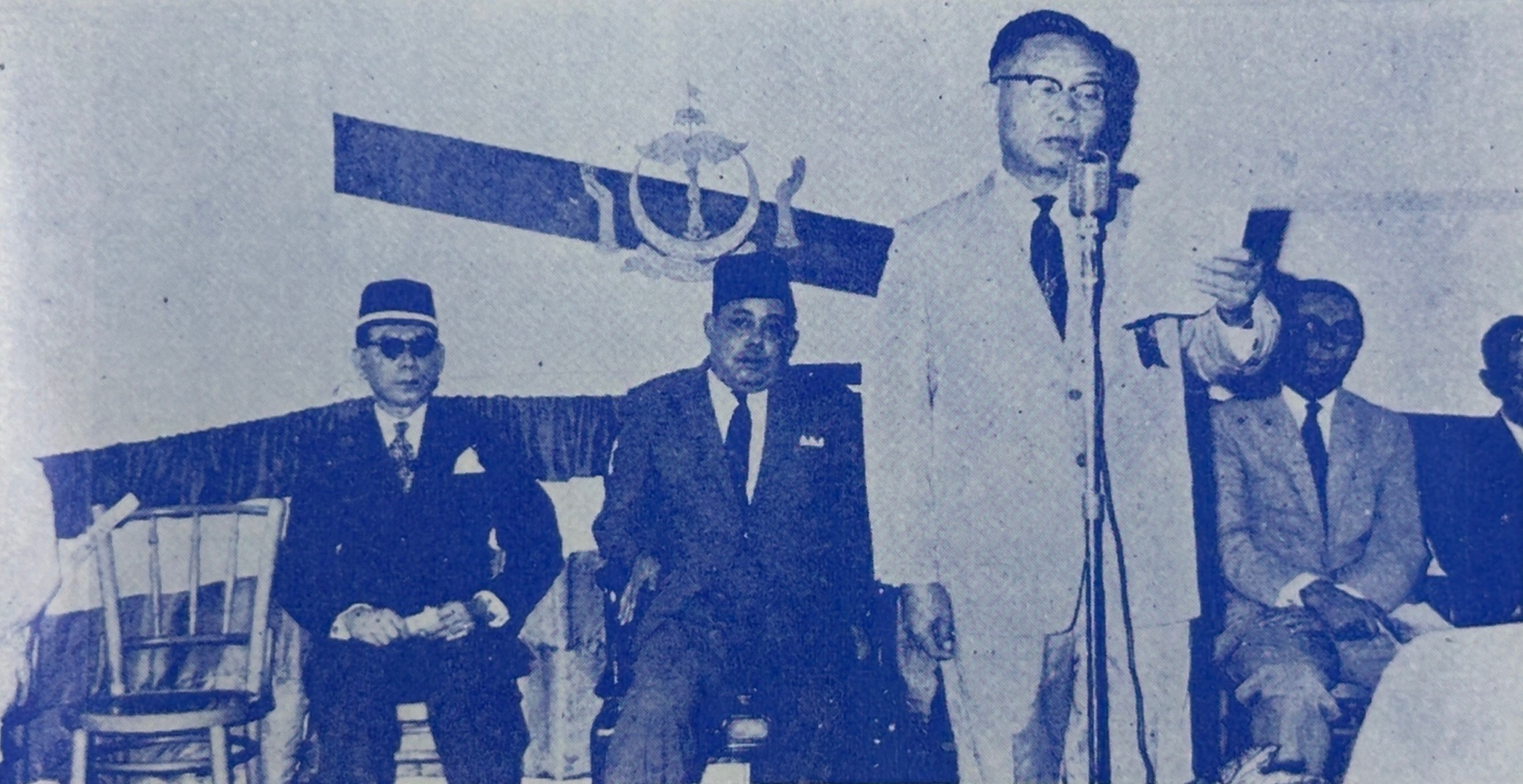
Ibrahim (left) and Pengiran Anak Mohamed Alam (centre) at the opening of the new Chung Ching Middle School building in 1960

The Select Committee, chaired by Ibrahim was tasked with reviewing a draft bill. The committee included various government officials and members of the sultan's London constitutional delegation. In May 1960, the committee decided to consult with the parliamentary draftsman, Hugh Hickling, on the general merits and drafting arrangements of the bill. The draft was based on the nationality law of Malaya but required adjustments. After the attorney-general's report in September 1960, the committee reviewed and revised the bill, leading to a second draft.

By 1961, Ibrahim observed the sultan's growing distrust of his advisers and tendency to overturn decisions without consultation, contributing to dissatisfaction and resignations. He noted the sultan's reluctance to address governance issues, which added to the instability. On 1 July 1961, Ibrahim advised against commenting on a controversial incident to prevent unrest, but remarks by state forest officer Mohd. Yakin Haji Long escalated tensions. The PRB responded with a pamphlet criticising the appointment of "colonial" officials and condemning Yakin's suggestion of deploying a Gurkha unit, accusing him of revealing plans to turn Brunei into a Malayan colony.

Tensions inside Brunei's government started to subside by the middle of 1961. Ibrahim had a medical leave of absence before to his retirement, and the improvement was aided by the departure of Malayan officers and the recruitment of local government servants. Personal complaints also decreased as a result of the sultan's diminished participation in daily operations. In July, the Standing Advisory Council on Defence, chaired by the sultan, met to discuss internal security, with Ibrahim absent due to his leave. Later that month, the sultan reassessed his appointments and promoted Marsal Maun, the deputy state secretary, to acting chief minister on 1 August 1961. He also appointed his closest advisers, including Marsal and Pengiran Muhammad Ali, the state religious affairs officer, to represent him.

Ibrahim retired on 1 August 1962 and was succeeded as chief minister by Marsal, becoming the second person to hold the position. His leave marked a shift in governance, as figures with nationalist leanings, such as Marsal, Pengiran Muhammad Yusuf, and Pengiran Ali, were appointed to key positions, signalling a change in the sultan's administration. Some of the sultan's advisers, including Marsal, were uncertain about the Malaysia Plan. Despite support from Pengiran Ali and Pengiran Yusuf, Marsal's wavering stance created tension. Reports suggested that Ibrahim might return to his post, though wiser counsel prevailed, and potential opposition from groups like the Brunei Malay Teachers Association, which supported Marsal, was avoided.

=== Speaker of the Legislative Council ===
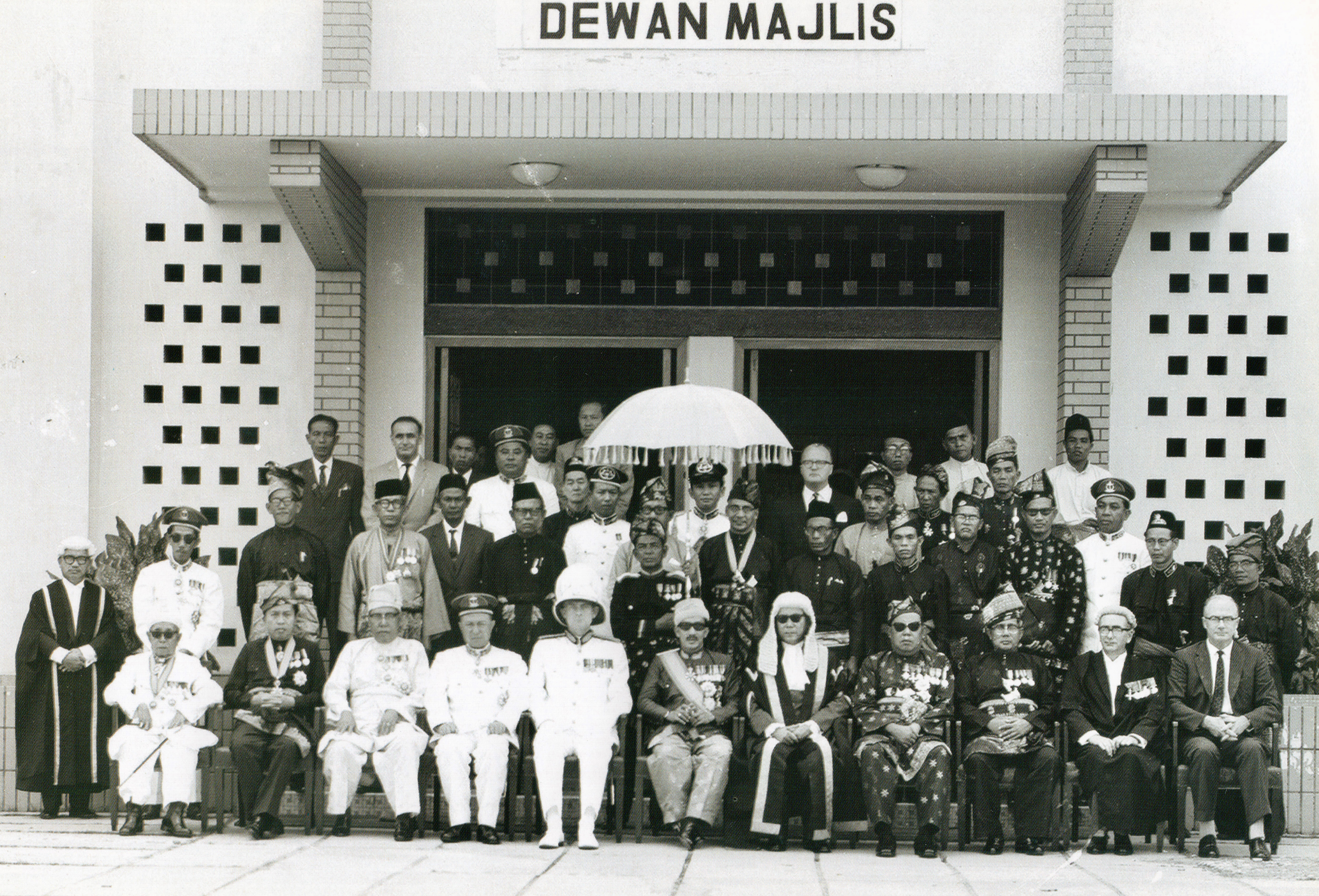
Ibrahim (seated fifth from the right) with the members of the 1963 LegCo

Despite completing his tenure as chief minister, Ibrahim was appointed by the sultan as the speaker of the LegCo after regaining his health in June 1963, with the first session opening on 28 August. On 28 January 1965, he accompanied the sultan to London for the funeral of Sir Winston Churchill. The council was dissolved on 30 January 1965 and re-established on 31 January, with Ibrahim reappointed as speaker. He was also appointed as an unofficial member of the Privy Council and was frequently consulted by the sultan for advice on general matters, drawing on his expertise and experience as a renowned administrative expert in Brunei.

Later that year, on 14 April, Ibrahim led the opening of the LegCo session at the Dewan Kemasharakatan, presiding over the session which began with a prayer. On 30 July, he led a delegation of five members from the LegCo, including Zain Serudin, to attend the Kedah State Legislative Assembly session from 7 to 10 August. Then, on 20 December, Ibrahim welcomed Pengiran Muda Hashim, who opened the second session of the sixth parliamentary season, and introduced him to the council members before the session began with a procession and prayer led by the district's kadhi. On 22 December 1966, he oversaw the swearing-in of Pengiran Anak Kemaluddin into the LegCo.

== Death and funeral ==
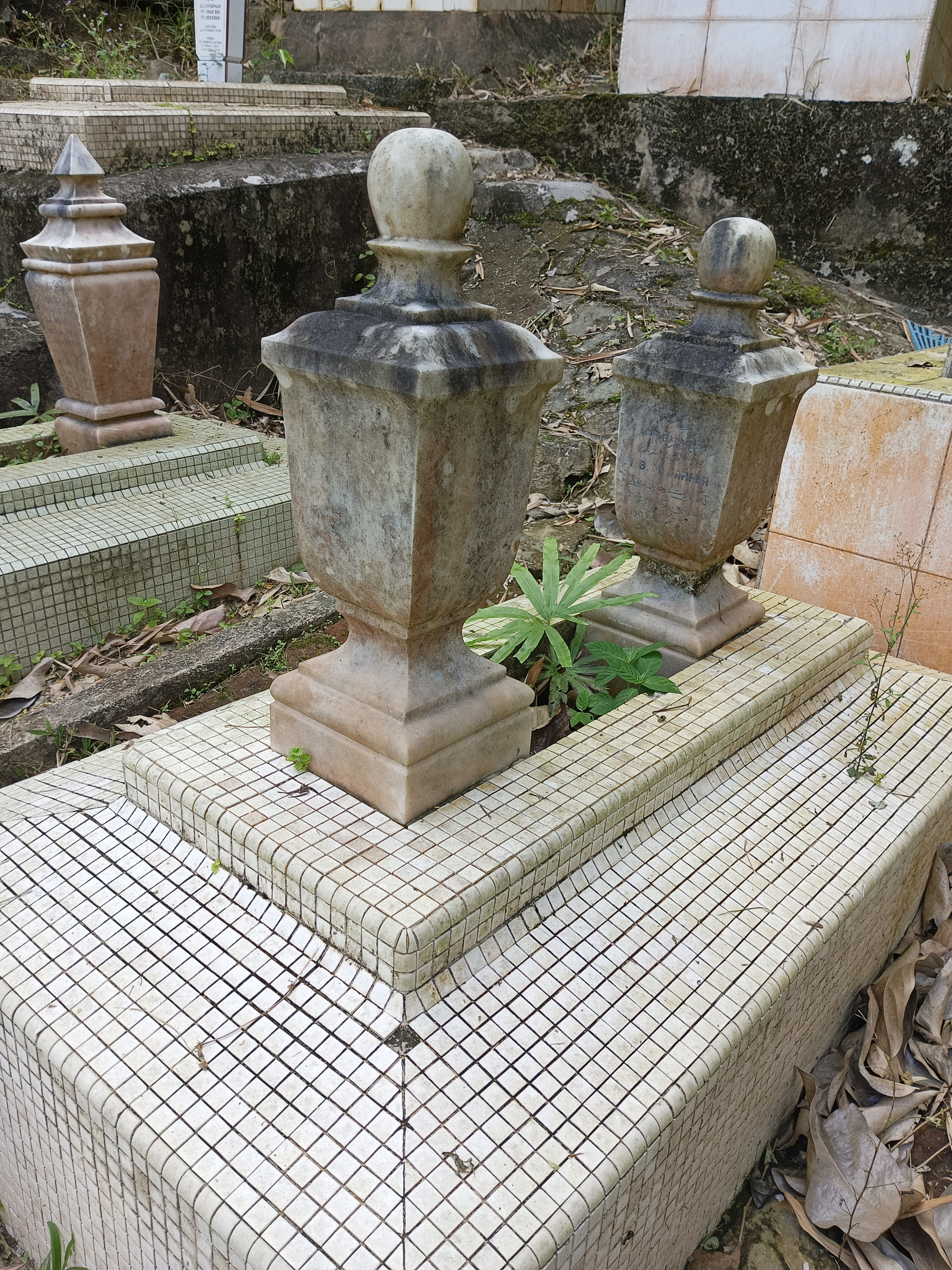
Grave of Pehin Dato Hj Ibrahim at Kianggeh Dagang Muslim, Cemetery, Bandar Seri Begawan, picture taken in 2024

Ibrahim died in the Brunei General Hospital on the morning after subuh prayer of 19 February 1971, at the age of 68. His body was buried that afternoon at the Dagang Cemetery along Jalan Residency, now part of Kianggeh Muslim Cemetery. Among those who paid their last respects at his residence in Kilanas on the Friday morning were Sultan Omar Ali Saifuddien, British High Commissioner Arthur Adair, various members of the royal family, including Pengiran Yusuf, and senior government officials.

== Personal life ==
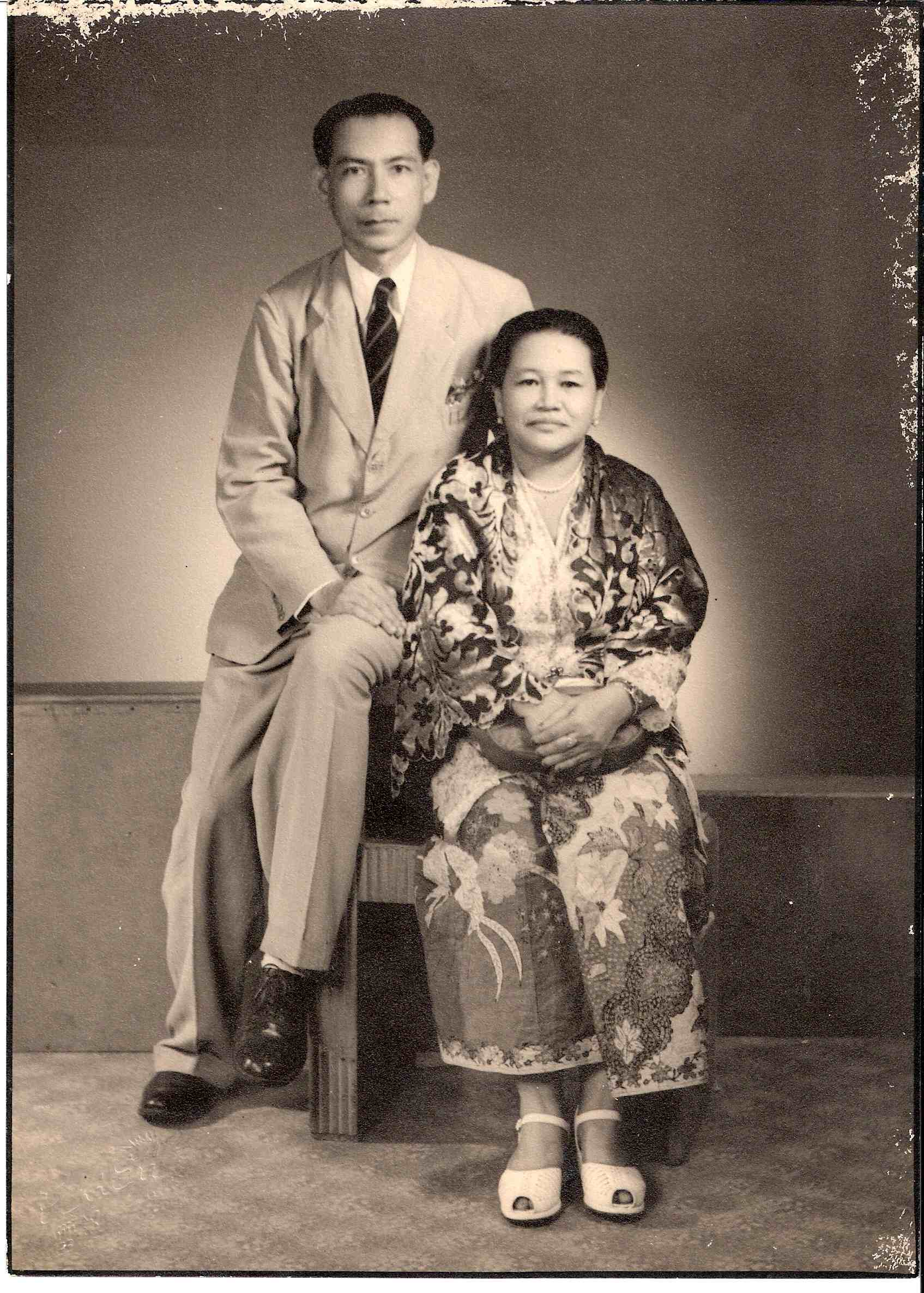
A portrait of Ibrahim alongside his wife

Ibrahim married Dayang Saadiah binti Awang Mohd Tahir, a native of Kampong Sungai Kedayan, on 22 December 1923. Together, they had four sons: Abbas Al-Sufri (1928–2014), who served as Sultan Omar Ali Saifuddien III's acting personal secretary from 1959 to 1961; Anuar (born 1931); Adnin (1933–2023), a nurse-turned-entrepreneur who founded Maha Seramik and the Adinin Group of Companies, and whose son Musa became a businessman and the first and only Mexican honorary consul in Brunei since 2000; and Isa (born 1935), who served as deputy chief minister from 1970 to 1972 and has been a special advisor to Sultan Hassanal Bolkiah since 1971, with his son Ahmad serving as Brunei's attorney general from 2020 to 2024, and his granddaughter Anisha Rosnah marrying Prince Abdul Mateen in 2024.

Ibrahim had a variety of hobbies, including playing football as a member of the Brunei Recreation Club, enjoying golf, playing the piano and violin, and in his leisure time, he liked to relax by the beach, reading magazines, photography, and occasionally having a picnic.

== Titles, styles and honours ==
=== Titles and styles ===
On 11 May 1951, Ibrahim was honoured by Sultan Omar Ali Saifuddien III with the manteri title of Pehin Datu Perdana Manteri, bearing the style Yang Dimuliakan Lagi Dihormati.

=== Honours ===
Ibrahim has been bestowed the following honours:

National

- Family Order of Laila Utama (DK) – Dato Laila Utama
- Order of Seri Paduka Mahkota Brunei First Class (SPMB; 23 September 1959) – Dato Seri Paduka
- Order of Seri Paduka Mahkota Brunei Second Class (DPMB; 23 September 1956) – Dato Paduka
- Order of Setia Negara Brunei Second Class (DSNB; 24 November 1960) – Dato Setia
- Omar Ali Saifuddin Medal (POAS)
- Meritorious Service Medal (PJK)
- Omar Ali Saifuddin Coronation Medal (31 May 1951)

Foreign

- United Kingdom:
  - Commander of the Order of the British Empire (CBE; 1960)
  - Officer of the Order of the British Empire (OBE; 1948)
  - Queen Elizabeth II Coronation Medal (2 June 1953)
- Japan:
  - Order of the Rising Sun, Gold Rays with Neck Ribbon

=== Things named after him ===
- Jalan Dato Ibrahim, a road in Bandar Seri Begawan.

== Notes ==
Political offices
| Preceded by Pengiran Muhammad Ali | 3rd Speaker of the Legislative Council of Brunei; 28 August 1963 – 19 February 1971 | Succeeded by Pengiran Anak Mohamed Alam |
| Preceded by Office established | 1st Menteri Besar of Brunei; 29 September 1959 – 1 August 1962 | Succeeded by Marsal Maun |
| Preceded by Office established | State Secretary of Brunei; 1941–1945 | Succeeded by Wan Ahmad Umar |
