= Abbas Al-Sufri =

Bruneian civil servant (1928–2014)

Yang Dimuliakan Pehin Orang Kaya Penggawa Laila Bentara Diraja Dato Laila Utama Abbas Al-Sufri DK SPMB DSNB POAS PHBS PBLI PJK MVO
- عباس الصوفري
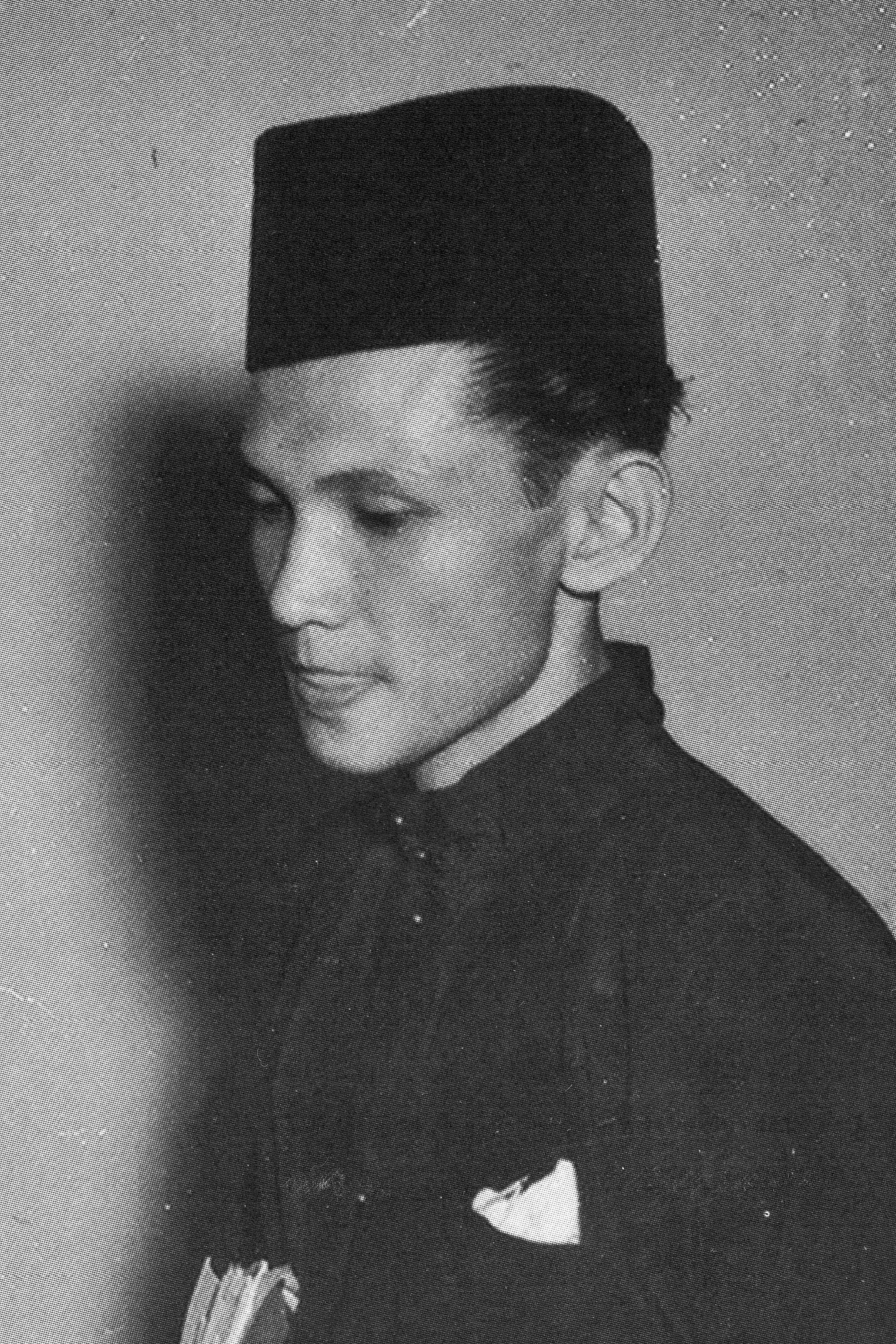
- Abbas Al-Sufri in the 1950s
- Born: 16 July 1928; Kilanas, Brunei Town, Brunei
- Died: 8 March 2014 (aged 85); Jerudong Park Medical Centre, Brunei–Muara, Brunei
- Burial place: Kianggeh Muslim Cemetery, Bandar Seri Begawan, Brunei
- Occupations: Personal secretary; courtier
- Employers: Sultan Omar Ali Saifuddien III
- Spouse: Besar Yusof (m. 1948)
- Father: Ibrahim Mohammad Jahfar
- Relatives: Isa Ibrahim (brother); Ahmad Isa (nephew); Musa Adnin (nephew)

Mohammad Abbas Al-Sufri bin Haji Ibrahim (16 July 1928 – 8 March 2014) was an aristocrat, civil servant and courtier from Brunei who previously served as the acting personal secretary to Sultan Omar Ali Saifuddien III. He had a career in the government service of Brunei, in which he held a number of important positions such as being a member of the Privy Council of Brunei from 1972 to 2014.

== Early life and education ==
Abbas Al-Sufri was born in Brunei on 16 July 1928, to Ibrahim Mohammad Jahfar (former Menteri Besar of Brunei). Additionally, he was the older brother of Pehin Orang Kaya Laila Setia Bakti Di-Raja Dato Laila Utama Haji Isa, the speaker of the legislative council from 2011 to 2015. He attended Chinese and Malay schools in Brunei Town (now Bandar Seri Begawan) and continued his education at the Government English School in Labuan from 1935 to 1942. In 1956, he participated in a Local Government Study Tour in London, Belfast, Edinburgh, Aberdeen, and Glasgow. He married Besar binti Haji Mohd. Yusof on 16 June 1948, and they have two daughters.

== Career ==
Abbas Al-Sufri worked in a variety of capacities during his career in the Brunei Administrative Service (BAS). In 1943, he started out as a clerk in the Japanese-occupied Land Transport Company. He was employed by the British Resident's Office, Public Works Department, and Electrical Office in 1948 as a Grade 'B' clerk. By 1951, he was working as an administrative official and an advisor to Sultan Omar Ali Saifuddien III.

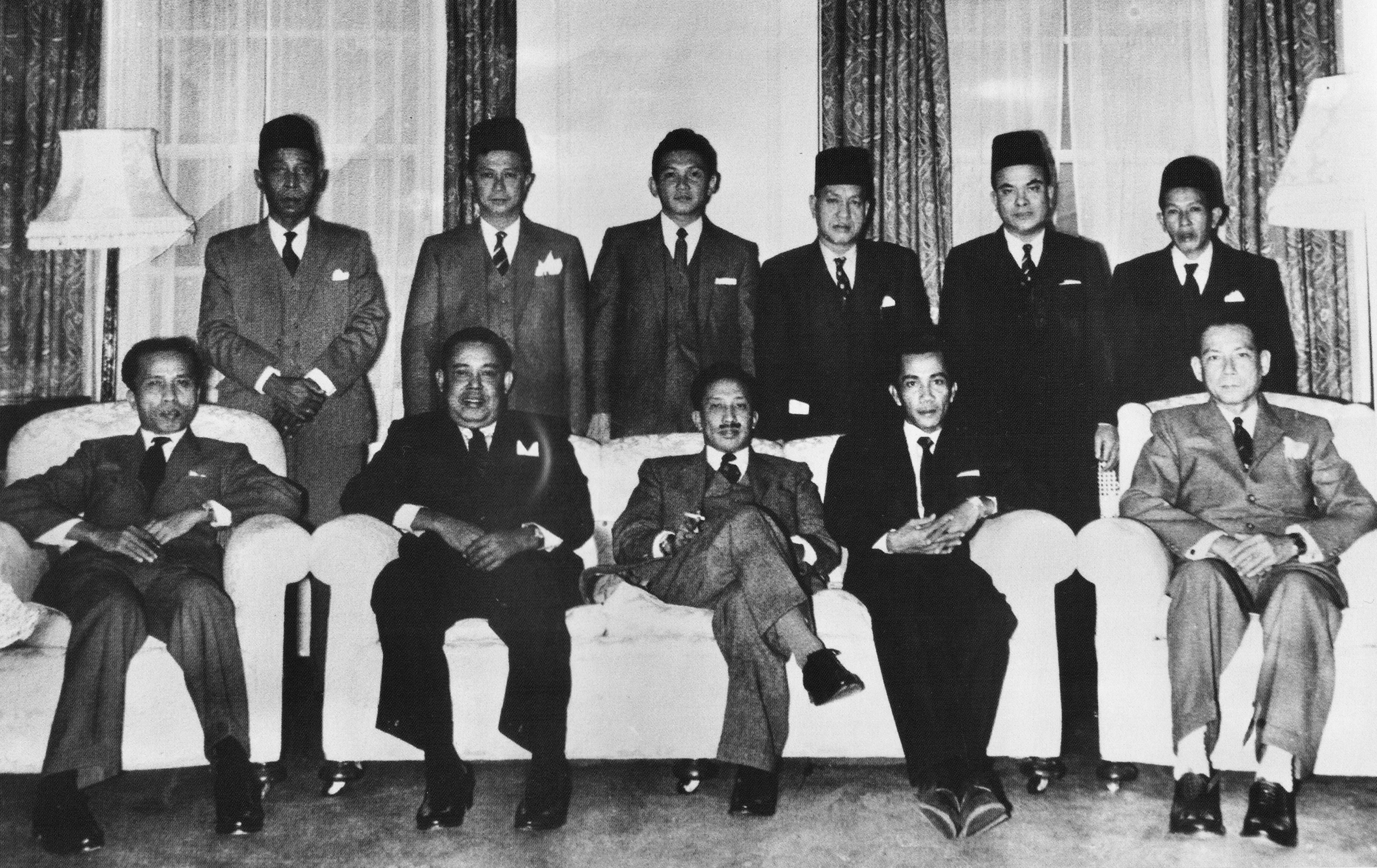
Abbas Al-Sufri (standing third from the left) pictured with the constitutional delegation in London in April 1959

On 1 January 1951, Abbas Al-Sufri began his employment with the government as the a probationer in the BAS. Later in 1953, he would join Sultan Omar Ali's entourage for coronation of Elizabeth II. On 26 April 1956, he stopped serving as the sultan's aide-de-camp (ADC), but he started back on 18 September 1956. From 29 September 1959 to 10 September 1961, he served as the Sultan's acting personal secretary. He and his father traveled to London in April 1959 as part of the Sultan's constitutional delegation to begin work on the Brunei Constitution during the 1959 Brunei Negotiations.

As ADC to the sultan, Abbas Al-Sufri reportedly urged TNKU rebel commanders Pengiran Matussin and Awang Hafiz to leave Istana Darul Hana when a group of rebels attempted to deliver a letter to the sultan; according to an unnamed source, the rebels refused to take the letter, and the sultan was never seen by the delegation. During the coronation ceremony at Lapau in Brunei Town on 1 August 1968, where Sultan Hassanal Bolkiah was crowned the 29th Sultan of Brunei by his predecessor Omar Ali Saifuddien, Abbas Al-Sufri carried the Kuching Emas, while Pengiran Abdul Momin held the Tungkat Ajai, two of the 25 ceremonial regalia used in the event.

Abbas Al-Sufri was later appointed chief protocol officer from 1968 till his retirement in 1983 upon turning 55. On 31 December 1983, during the declaration of Brunei's independence at Omar Ali Saifuddien Mosque in Bandar Seri Begawan, Abbas Al-Sufri, along with Pengiran Mokhtar Puteh, played a key role in carrying the "Warkah Pemashuran Kemerdekaan Brunei Darussalam" from the grand chamberlain into Taman Haji Sir Muda Omar 'Ali Saifuddien, accompanied by 20 individuals bearing the Royal Regalia Museum.

Abbas Al-Sufri held and performed the tasks assigned to him, such as arranging and maintaining the ceremonial positions and the vehicles for the queen consort, princess consorts, or other sultan wives in all royal ceremonies, both inside and outside the palace. He was also in charge of planning and overseeing the sultan and his consort's food, health, and sleeping arrangements. He continued to work under contract after retirement until 1992.

== Later life and death ==
On Sunday, 9 March 2014, Sultan Hassanal Bolkiah paid his homage at the home of the late Abbas Al-Sufri on Jalan Raja Isteri Pengiran Anak Saleha in Bandar Seri Begawan. At the age of 85, He died on Saturday, 8 March. Under the direction of State Mufti Abdul Aziz Juned, the sultan also participated in the congregational burial prayer at his home at Mile 1, Jalan Tutong. He is interred at Kianggeh Muslim Cemetery.

During his lifetime, Abbas Al-Sufri had several hobbies, including collecting cars, stamps, and Hari Pertama covers. He also enjoyed various recreational activities such as sports and shooting. In addition, he was active in charitable work and social welfare. Notably, he was also one of the 21 pupils that worked to establish the Brunei Scout Association from the Government English School's First Labuan Scout Troop.

== Titles, styles and honours ==
=== Titles and styles ===
On 23 September 1958, Sultan Omar Ali Saifuddien III bestowed the title of Pehin Orang Kaya Sanggamara Setia Diraja; and later, on 7 May 1968, Abbas Al-Sufri received the upgraded title of Pehin Orang Kaya Penggawa Laila Bentara Diraja. The titles are styled as Yang Dimuliakan.

- 23 September 1958 – 7 May 1968: Pehin Orang Kaya Sanggamara Setia Diraja
- 7 May 1968 – 8 March 2014: Pehin Orang Kaya Penggawa Laila Bentara Diraja

=== Honours ===
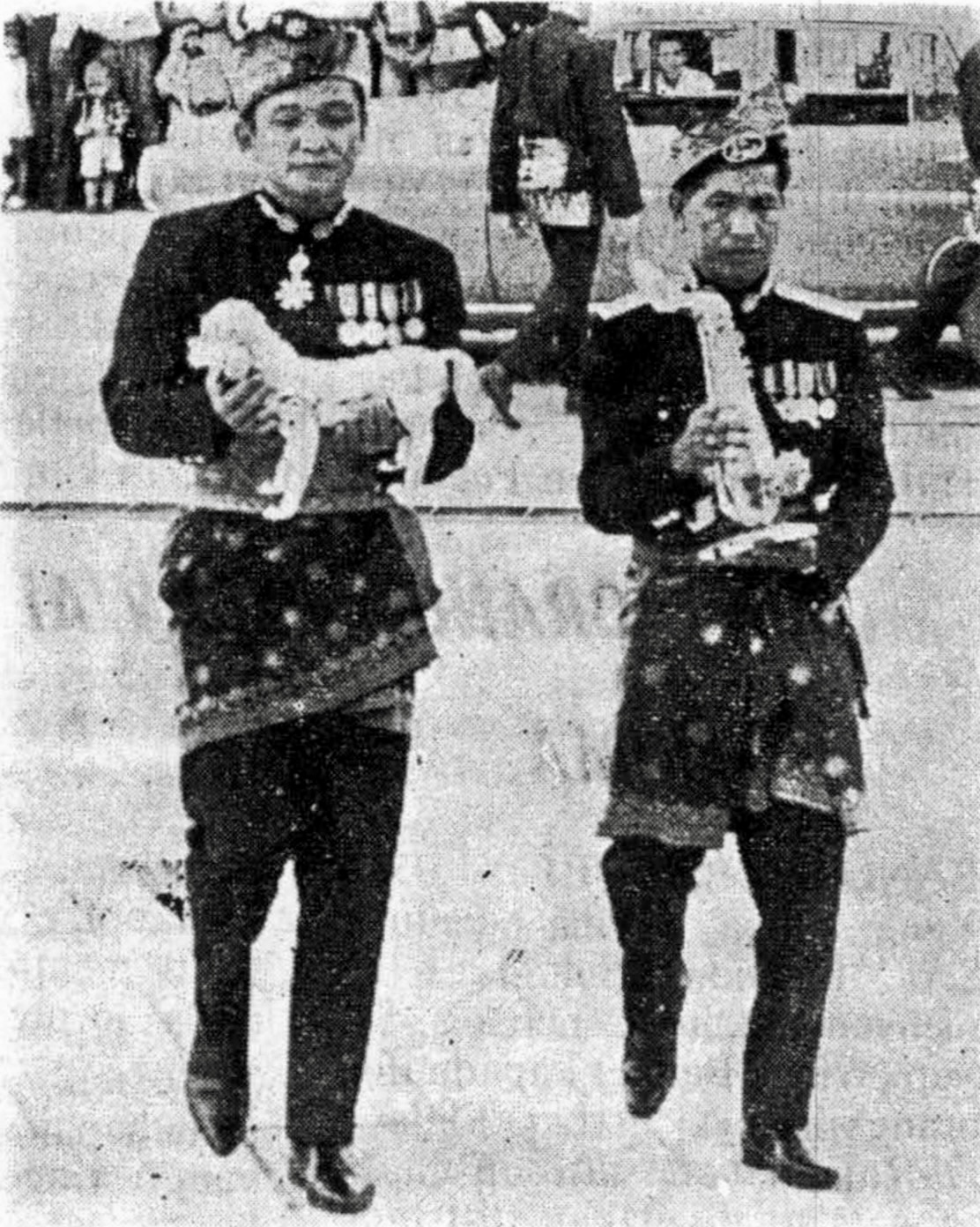
Abbas Al-Sufri (left) and Pengiran Abdul Momin (right) carrying the Kuching Emas and Tungkat Ajai, respectively, during the coronation of Sultan Hassanal Bolkiah in 1968

Abbas Al-Sufri has been awarded the following national and foreign honours;

National

- Family Order of Laila Utama (DK; 1972) – Dato Laila Utama
- Family Order of Seri Utama (DK; 1968) – Dato Seri Utama
- Order of Seri Paduka Mahkota Brunei First Class (SPMB; 12 February 1969) – Dato Seri Paduka
- Order of Seri Paduka Mahkota Brunei Second Class (DPMB; 23 September 1958) – Dato Paduka
- Order of Seri Paduka Mahkota Brunei Third Class (SMB; 1954)
- Order of Setia Negara Brunei Second Class (DSNB; 23 September 1963) – Dato Setia
- Sultan Hassanal Bolkiah Medal (PHBS; 1972)
- Omar Ali Saifuddin Medal First Class (POAS; 23 September 1959)
- Meritorious Service Medal (PJK; 1968)
- Long Service Medal (PKL; 1968)
- Coronation Medal (1 August 1968)
- Campaign Medal
- Sultan of Brunei Silver Jubilee Medal (5 October 1992)

Foreign

- Selangor:
  - Sultan Salahuddin Silver Jubilee Medal (3 September 1985)
- United Kingdom:
  - Member of the Royal Victorian Order (MVO; 1972)

=== Things named after him ===
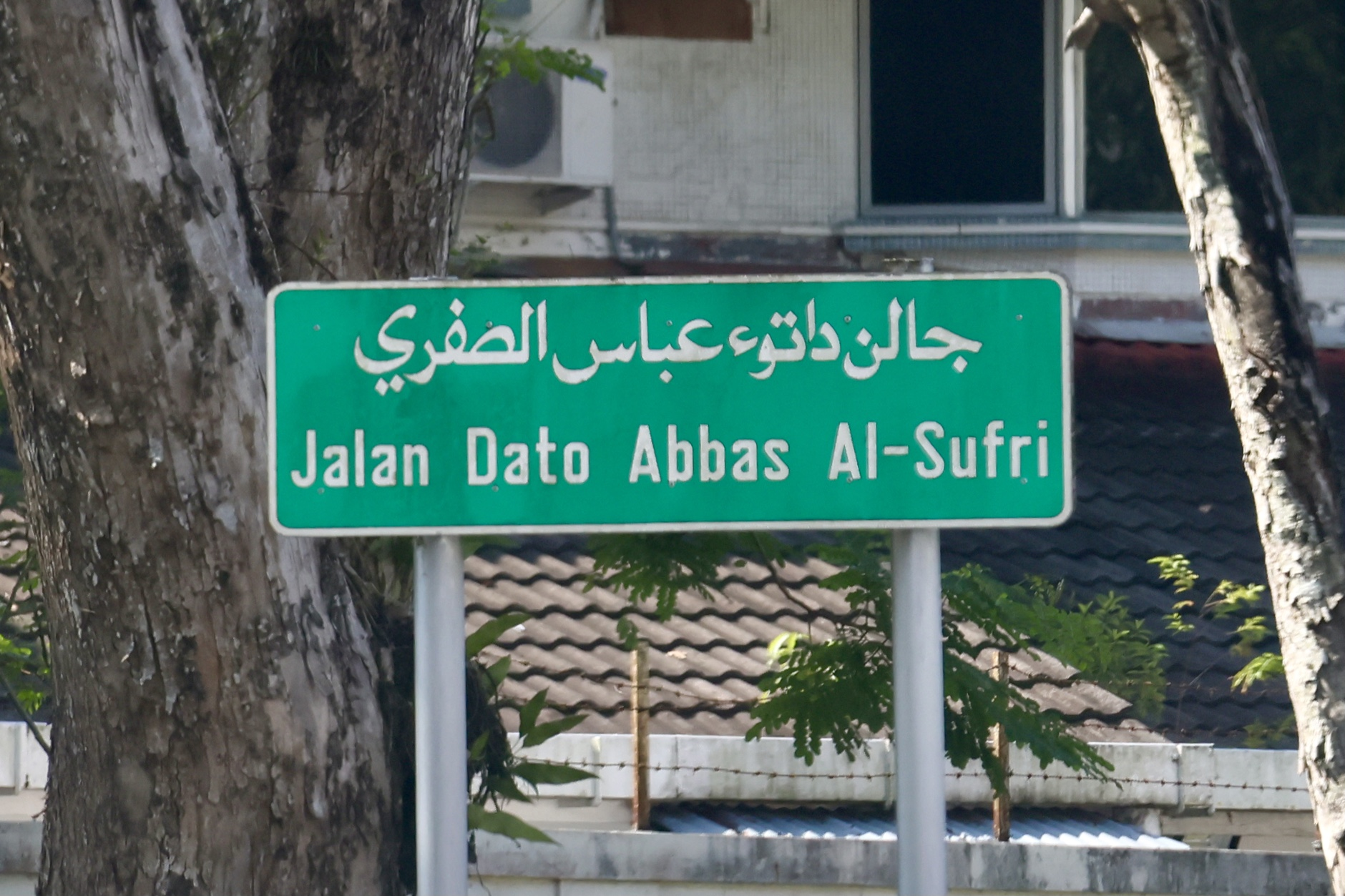
Jalan Dato Abbas Al-Sufri sign

- Jalan Dato Abbas Al-Sufri, a road in Bandar Seri Begawan.
