= Musa Adnin =

Bruneian politician and diplomat

Musa Adnin PSB PJK
- موسى ادنين
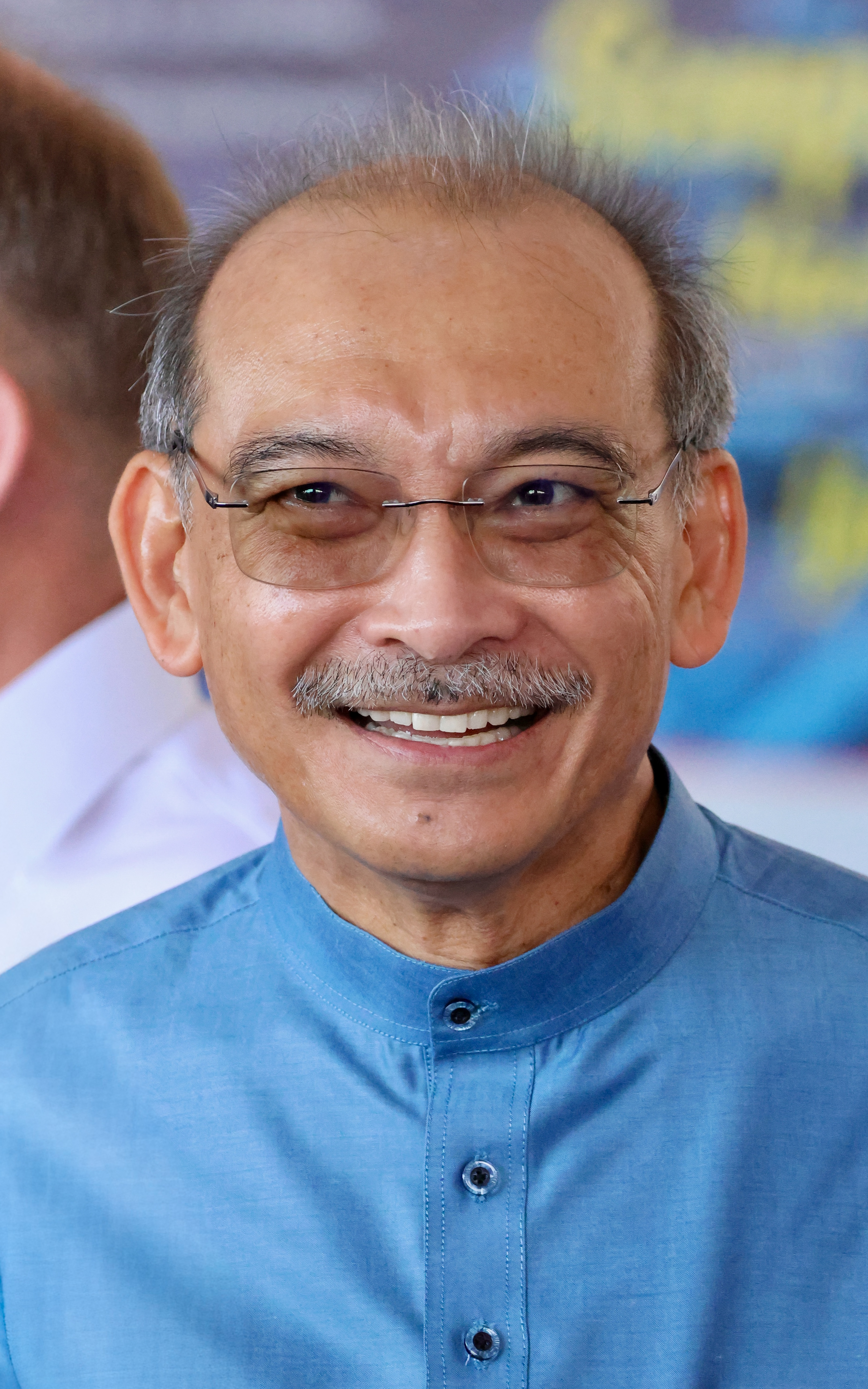
- Musa in 2024

Honorary Consul of Mexico in Brunei
- Incumbent
- Assumed office 2000
- Monarch: Hassanal Bolkiah
- Preceded by: Office established

Personal details
- Born: Brunei
- Children: 4
- Parent(s): Adnin Ibrahim (father); Aisha Ismail (mother)
- Relatives: Ibrahim Mohammad Jahfar (grandfather); Isa Ibrahim (uncle); Abbas Al-Sufri (uncle); Ahmad Isa (cousin)
- Profession: Businessman; diplomat
- Known for: managing director of Adinin Group of Companies

Musa bin Haji Adnin or sometimes referred to as Haji Musa Adinin, is a Bruneian businessman and diplomat who became the first and only Mexican Honorary Consulate in Kuala Belait since 2000. Additionally, he is the managing director of Adinin Group (AG) of Companies since 1991, Adinin Works & Engineering (AWE), Straits Central Agencies and director of AEGIS Secure Solutions.

== Education and early life ==
Out of eight children, Musa is the third. He received his education in Brunei, Singapore, and Malaysia. He obtained his experience through entrepreneurial pursuits and a broad range of domestic and international courses, seminars, and conferences on topics related to entrepreneurship, management, technology, health, safety, and the environment.

== Business career ==
Musa has been a manager and business owner since the 1980s. Along with these, he owns shares in a number of other businesses that are engaged in manufacturing, waste management, logistics, travel, marine vessel chartering, real estate, foodservice, education and training, engineering, procurement, onshore and offshore construction and commissioning (EPCC), IT solutions, and operation and maintenance. Along with two other people, Ahmad Morshidi and his cousin Ahmad Isa, he founded AEGIS Secure Solutions.

=== Adinin Group ===
His father started carefully buying assets from foreign businesses who choose to leave the Sultanate as soon as Brunei gained independence in 1984. These assets were mostly in the hardware and petroleum services industries. Soon after Musa's graduation, he and his father jumped at the chance to take part in an initiative launched by the Brunei Shell Petroleum (BSP) and the Bruneian government to support regional companies. Due to Musa's perseverance and his father's negligence, the AG grew to include about 20 businesses that specialise in IT, tourism, advertisements, paint products and interior design. Together, they absorbed a number of sister companies that strengthen AG. Adnin gave over his position as the group's managing director to his son in the middle of the 1990s, at which point he took on the chairmanship.

AG pledged to help the Bruneian government's efforts to stop the coronavirus from spreading throughout the nation by contributing B$200,000 to the COVID-19 Relief Fund, as given by its managing director Musa. In 2022, he stated that ASEAN need to enhance the lives of the rural population in ASEAN, safeguard the environment, and get ready for the digital future.

=== Other positions ===
In addition, Musa holds the positions of Vice President of the National Chamber of Commerce & Industry's (NCCIBD) executive committee and Vice Chairman Il of the Brunei Darussalam Malay Chamber of Commerce & Industry's governance committee. He was named the ABAC's national representative, a member of the China-ASEAN Business Network for Brunei Darussalam and Universiti Brunei Darussalam's (UBD) council. In addition, he has the titles of first honorary president of the French Bruneian Business Association (FBBA) since 2005, first Honorary Consul of Mexico in Brunei Darussalam and the interim general manager of Anson International.

== Personal views ==
Musa highlighted that the official ratification of the ASEAN Digital Economy Framework Agreement, which establishes the region's dedication to the expansion of the digital economy, and the ASEAN QR Code Financial Integration are supported by the business industry, including ASEAN Business Advisory Council (ABAC). To build confidence and draw investment, issues like cybersecurity and digital security are handled actively. Additionally, he stated that in order to embrace the economy of digital media, we must foster an innovative and cooperative culture that will propel Brunei toward an efficient technological future.

== Personal life ==
Musa is the son of the late businessman and nurse, Haji Adnin (1932–2023). He is also the grandson of the first Menteri Besar of Brunei, Pehin Dato Haji Ibrahim. As of 2021, he is married and has four children, including Muhammad Luqman Hakeem.

== Honours and awards ==
Musa has earned the following honours;

- Order of Setia Negara Brunei Fourth Class (PSB; 2011)
- Meritorious Service Medal (PJK; 2006)
- ASEAN BAC Legacy Award for Brunei Darussalam (6 September 2017)
