= Yen San Building =

Office Building in Singapore

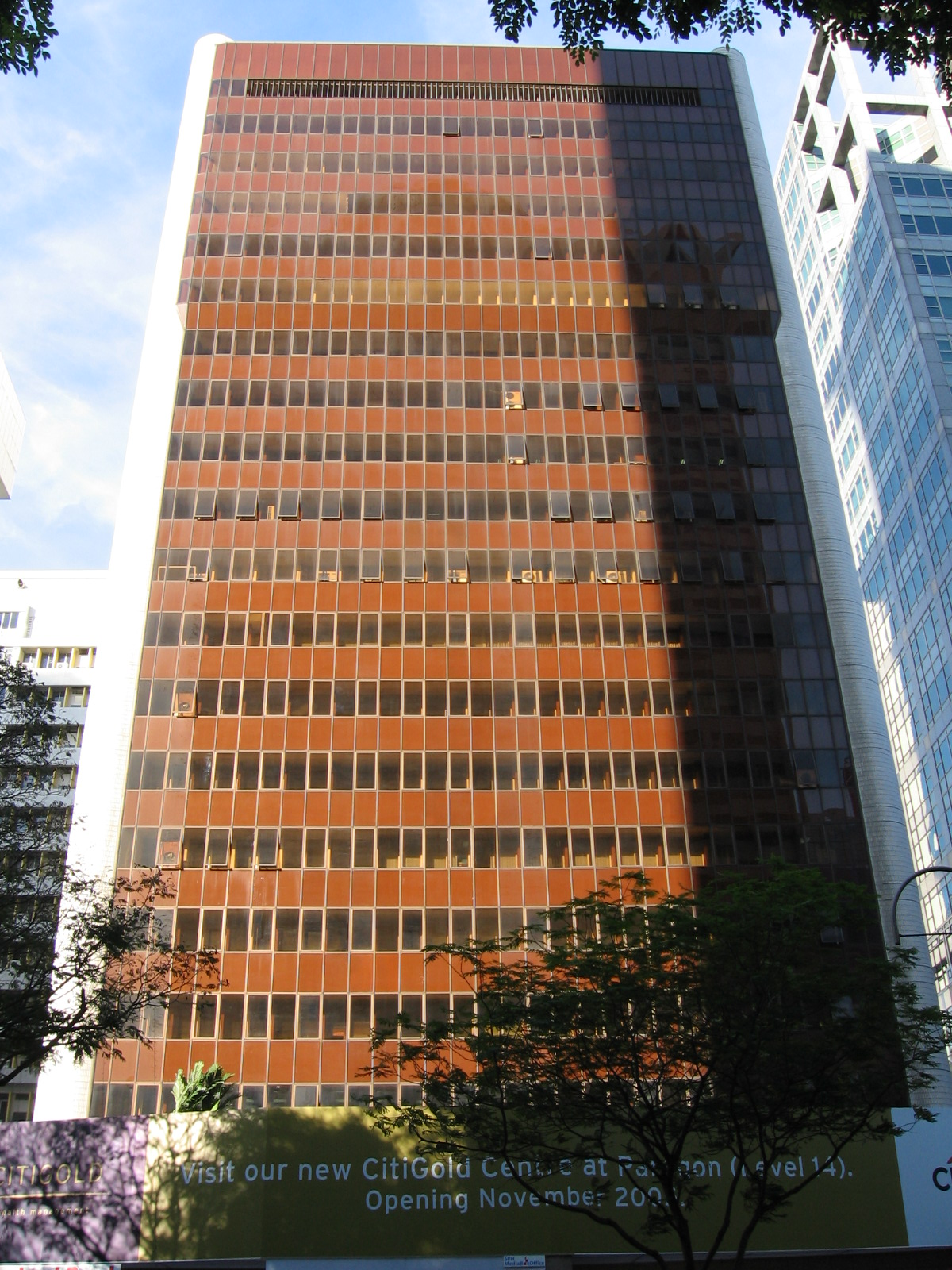
Yen San Building in 2005.

Yen San Building, later known as 268 Orchard Road, was an office building on Orchard Road in the Orchard Planning Area of Singapore. Completed by the Asia Motor Company in 1973, it housed the United States Trade Centre in Singapore. It was demolished in 2011.

== History ==
In September 1971, the Asia Motor Company announced that it would be building the complex as "good office space" on Orchard Road was "insufficient." By then, construction on the 20-storey building had begun and was scheduled to be completed by the end of the year. The building was to feature a carpark with a capacity of 180 cars, four lifts, windows made of tinted glass, air-conditioning, soundproofed ceilings and floors made of vinyl asbestos tiles. It was named after Phng Yen San, the company's founder. In November 1972, it was announced that office space within the building, which was by then "almost ready for partial occupation", would be let out for upwards of $1.40 per sq ft. In February 1973, it was announced that the company Nissei Sangyo Singapore, which was formed through an agreement between Hitachi of Japan and A. C. Enterprises, a local company, would have its offices at the building, which was scheduled to be completed in the following month. Later that month, it was announced that an American trade centre costing $200,000 was to open at the building on 9 July.

The United States Trade Centre officially opened on 15 June. Then-Deputy Assistant Secretary of the United States Department of Commerce Edward L. Allen, then-United States Ambassador to Singapore Edwin M. Cronk and then-Chairman of the Economic Development Board Chan Chin Bock were among the nearly 100 people who attended the opening ceremony. The centre was to serve as a venue for the showcasing of American products and regularly hold trade promotion events, as well as events showcasing the products of individual companies. C. Thomas Mayfield served as the centre's first director. On the day of its opening, the centre launched an exhibition on marine equipment which featured the products of around 20 American companies. In October, Citibank announced that it would be relocating its branch on Orchard Road to the Yen San Building from its former premises the Hotel Singapura. The branch was to be fully operational by January of the following year. In the same month, both Merill Lynch, Pierce, Fenner & Smith and Bache opened their Singaporean offices in the building. In August 1977, the Jack's Place steakhouse opened its second outlet in the bottom of the building. The branch became a "popular eating spot, especially for the office lunch-time crowd." The restaurant also operated The Cellar, a popular pub that was also in the building. The pub closed in 1990 when it was decided that Jack's Place was to expand into the unit it was occupying.

In August 1989, the Asia Motor Company announced that it would be putting the building up for sale. It was reported that the building, which was then fully occupied, provided a gross yield of over $5 million, while its carpark provided an additional $110,000. In October, DBS Land acquired the building for a record $1600 per sq ft, which amounted to $168.8 million in total. The building was DBS Land's first office block on Orchard Road. In 1996, the building, which had by then been renamed 268 Orchard Road, was put up for sale. In August, it was announced that the building was to be sold to Baronet Ltd. for $184 million under an asset securitisation deal. It was the second time DBS Land had performed such a deal. In February 2004, CapitaLand sold the building to Ngee Ann Development for $135 million. Ngee Ann Development announced their plan to redevelop the property in January of the following year. It was demolished to make way for 268 Orchard, which was completed in 2015.
