= Chee Swee Cheng =

Peranakan businessman

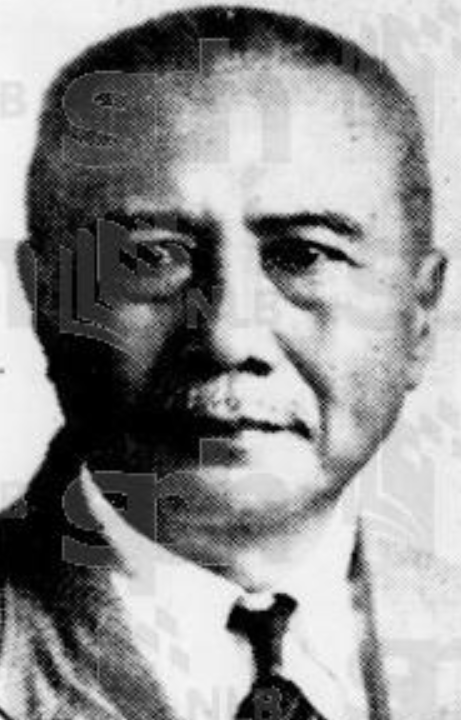
Chee Swee Cheng

Chee Swee Cheng (1866 — 22 August 1938) was a prominent Peranakan businessman and banker in Singapore and North Borneo.

== Early life and education ==
Chee was born in Malacca in 1866, where he received his education. He was the grandson of prominent merchant Chee Yam Chuan.

== Career ==
Chee came to Singapore at the age of 16 and became employed at Lim Tiang Wah & Co. as a cashier. He was employed at Leack, Chin Seng & Co four years later. In 1890, he became a trustee of the Keng Teck Whay society. In 1900, he became a partner of the General Spirit and Opium Farm in North Borneo. He was later appointed the farm's manager. He was then given 5,000 acres of land by the local government for planting, which he used for cultivating tapioca and later rubber, as well as establish a sawmill. He also founded two scholarships, established several brickfields and developed many shophouses. He then returned to Singapore and established an ice factory.

In 1917, Chee co-founded the Ho Hong Bank in Singapore, and served as the bank's director. When the bank merged with the Chinese Commercial Bank and the Oversea-Chinese Bank to form the Oversea-Chinese Banking Corporation in 1932, he became the first chairman of the Oversea-Chinese Banking Corporation.

In 1931, Chee built the Heeren Building on the corner of Orchard Road and Cairnhill Road .

== Personal life and death ==
Chee built the Chee Family Mansion in Malacca in honour of his father. He was a philanthropist, and frequently donated to several local institutions, including the St. Andrew's Mission Hospital and the Child Welfare Society.

Chee died on 22 August 1938.
