= Jack's Place (restaurant) =

Restaurant chain

Coordinates: 1.3549°N 103.8930°E

Jack's Place is a Singaporean chain of Western-styled restaurant that was established in 1966 by Jack Hunt. There are 12 outlets in Singapore as of July 2026,, and a central kitchen in 10 Defu Lane.

== History ==
Say Lip Hai (Chinese: 史立谐; HTS: Se^{3} Liop^{8}hai^{3}) immigrated to Singapore from Hainan and first found work as a cookboy, serving British troops in the Sembawang Barracks. He opened his first restaurant, the Cola Restaurant and Bar, in 1967. In 1968, Say was approached by a British couple, Jack Hunt and his wife, about starting a catering business operating out of Hunt's pub in Killiney Road which eventually became Jack’s Place Steak House. In 1972 or 1974, Hunt sold the business to Say.

Say began opening locations in suburban neighbourhoods- with his first branch being his original Cola Restaurant & Bar in Sembawang (along Jalan Legundi), now renamed "Jack's Cola". He then obtained a location in Ang Mo Kio and named his new outlet "Jack's Garden". Branches were opened in the city centre at Bras Basah and across Singapore. The colours of the original Jack's Place were changed to green and white after Mr Say bought the company.,

In 1991, a headquarters building at Defu Lane was built.

Female waitresses at one time wore traditional Malay Kebaya sarongs (Malay ethnic dress) as their outfits. In the 1990s, it was changed to the current outfit. The restaurant design for Jack's Place started out with dark colours and wood tones. The colour scheme later changed to blue and red checkers.

In 1996, the company faced a financial setback caused by an outbreak of mad cow disease. Business fell by as much as 25 percent, as Singaporeans avoided Jack’s Place and its primarily bovine menu.

In 2003, the company opened the first Jack's Place outlet in Utama, Malaysia. In 2006, a new brand, Eatzi Gourmet, was introduced.

In 2008, the company went through a re-branding and the restaurants now fall under the new umbrella company JP Pepperdine. Table spreads were changed to match the green and white checkered design following the rebranding. The company also opened Brewbaker's Kitchen & Bar.

In 2010, the company acquired Restaurant Hoshigaoka.

== Products ==
Jack's Place features a variety of steaks, and also serves grills, salads, seafood, pizza and pasta.

== Recent projects ==
In collaboration with the Health Promotion Board, Jack's Place participates in the Healthier Dining Programme. The first phase of HPB’s food strategy aims to increase the number of healthier eat-out meals consumed to 180 million meals per year by 2020 by partnering with 18 food service providers to offer 500-calorie meals across 700 outlets and stalls island-wide. In accordance with this, the restaurants features healthier options throughout their menu.
