= ICube =

iCube can refer to:

- International Consortium of Universities for the Study of Biodiversity and the Environment (iCUBE)
- Power Mac G4 Cube, a small form factor Macintosh personal computer from Apple Inc.
- iCube Corporation, see Valups, a Korean company
- iCube-1, a miniaturised satellite
