= Institute for Biodiversity and Environmental Research =

Research institute in Brunei

- Institut Penyelidikan Biodiversiti dan Alam Sekitar

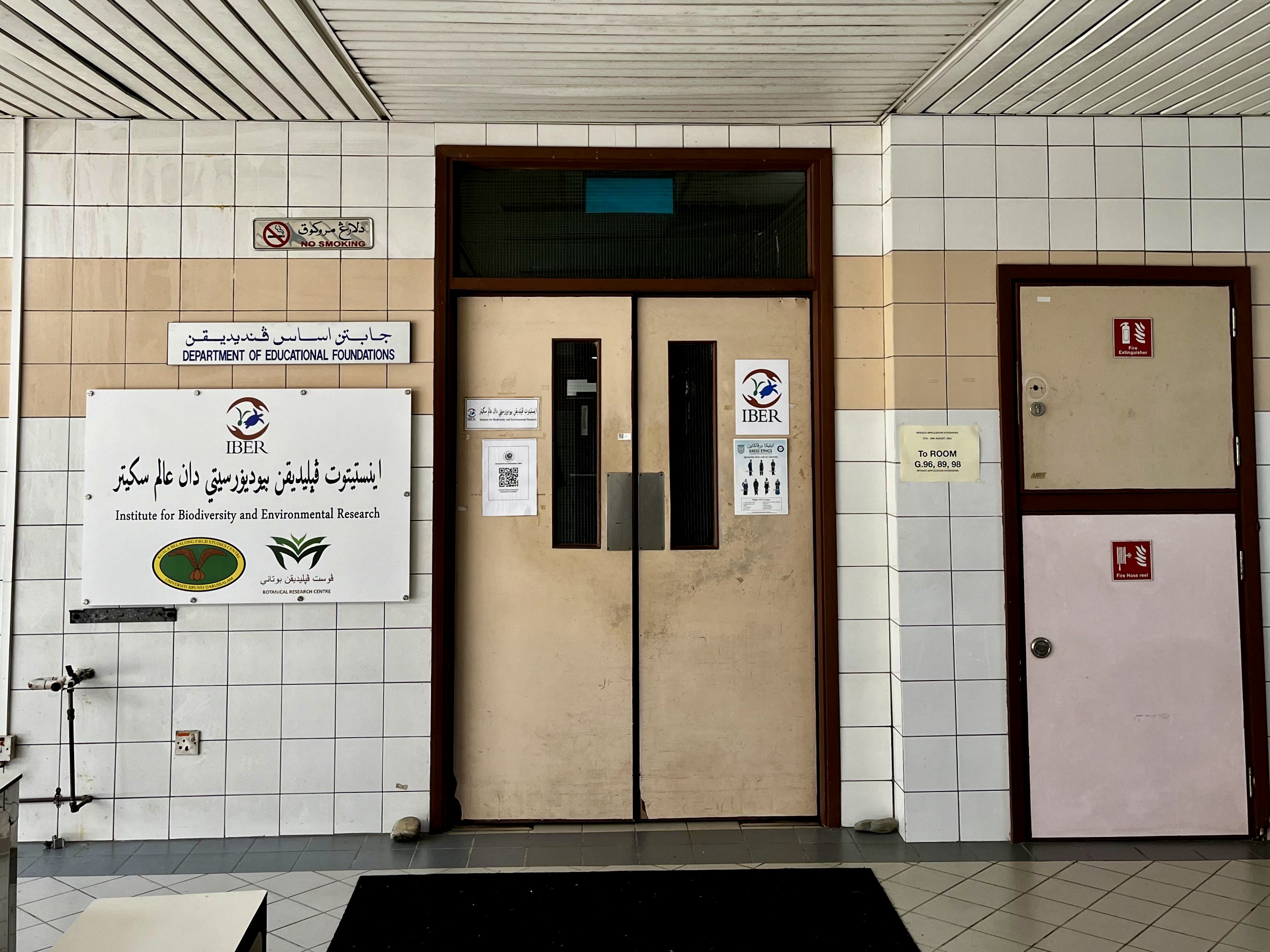
- The institute in 2024
- Nickname: IBER
- Established: 12 September 2013; 12 years ago
- Field of research: Biodiversity; Environment
- Location: Brunei-Muara, Brunei; 4.9752440°N 114.8911105°E
- Campus: Universiti Brunei Darussalam
- Location within Brunei

The Institute for Biodiversity and Environmental Research (IBER; Malay: Institut Penyelidikan Biodiversiti dan Alam Sekitar; Jawi: اينستيتوت ڤڽليديقن بيوديۏرسيتي دان عالم سکيتر) in Brunei Darussalam (Borneo/Southeast Asia) is a research institute of Universiti Brunei Darussalam (UBD) dedicated to biodiversity and environmental sciences research and education. IBER's location within the northwest Borneo hotspot offers unique opportunities for long-term studies in both terrestrial and marine tropical ecosystems.

== History ==
Biodiversity and environment have been the university's research strengths since its founding in 1985. This was further developed through the Brunei Rainforest Project, a collaborative project between UBD and the Royal Geographical Society (RGS) in the establishment of a permanent field research facility in the Ulu Temburong National Park - the Kuala Belalong Field Studies Centre (KBFSC) where a 14-month scientific expedition was carried out in 1991–1992. Since then, KBFSC has gained local and international recognition as a centre for tropical rainforest research and education in Borneo. UBD has participated in and led several expeditions to forest areas within the Heart of Borneo (HoB) boundary including the Sarawak Forestry Department expeditions to Lanjak Entimau and Paya Maga, the UBD-led biodiversity surveys to Sungai Ingei Conservation Forest and the iCUBE Scientific Expedition to Bukit Pagon, Brunei Darussalam. Following these significant milestones achieved in the biodiversity and environment research frontier, IBER was established in 2013 to further develop and expand prospects and international collaborations in biodiversity explorations within Brunei. The Institute's establishment was officially announced by Sultan Hassanal Bolkiah at UBD's 25th convocation ceremony on 12 September 2013.

== Scope ==
IBER was set up as a focal agency within UBD that functions to coordinate, facilitate, support and execute research, education and outreach activities or programmes within the biodiversity and environmental scope (both terrestrial and marine). KBFSC, previously an independent research centre of UBD, is now managed as the premier international research and educational facility for IBER and remains as a core research focus of UBD.

== Research ==
Brunei Darussalam is one of the top ten forested nations in the world, and is situated in the hyperdiverse northwest Borneo tropical forests and the edge of the Coral Triangle. Recognising Brunei's strengths and prominence in biodiversity, the university has biodiversity and environmental studies as one of its five key research areas.

Biodiversity and environmental research at the institute is conducted through university- and government-funded research projects, as well as international. A major initiative of the institute is the establishment of the International Consortium of Universities for the study of Biodiversity and the Environment (iCUBE). This group brings together a core group of research universities (King's College London, Korea University, Monash University, National University of Singapore, Universiti Brunei Darussalam, University of Auckland, University of Bonn, and University of North Carolina at Chapel Hill) united in a shared goal of research and education on biodiversity and the environment.

The institute has a network of 1 ha permanent forest plots located throughout Brunei Darussalam. Set up in the early 1990s, five plots are located in lowland Mixed Dipterocarp Forests in the Belait and Tutong districts and at KBFSC, and two heath (Kerangas) forest plots are located in the Belait district. The institute also manages a series of nine 0.25 ha plots at three altitudinal ranges at KBFSC. In 2007, the University, in collaboration with the Center for Tropical Forest Science of Harvard University, commenced the establishment of the 25 ha UBD-CTFS Plot at KBFSC.

== Education and outreach ==
KBFSC is the core facility for educational activities organised by IBER. Since its inception, KBFSC has served as a venue for various education programmes, field courses and field based workshops participated by undergraduate and high school students. Themes encompass tropical rainforest biodiversity and ecology, emergent issues of biodiversity conservation, sustainability and climate change. ‘Friends of Belalong’ is an outreach programme embarked by KBFSC and is currently adopted by IBER. It is a volunteer programme aimed at promoting biodiversity and environmental awareness and instilling the values of conservation among the public. The programme welcomes local and international volunteers.
