= Universiti Brunei Darussalam =

National university in Brunei

University of Brunei Darussalam
- Universiti Brunei Darussalam (Malay) يونيبرسيتي بروني دارالسلام (Jawi)
- Crest of Universiti Brunei Darussalam
- Motto: Ke Arah Kesempurnaan Insan (Malay)
- Motto in English: Towards Human Perfection
- Type: Public national research university
- Established: 28 October 1985
- Founder: Sultan Hassanal Bolkiah
- Accreditation: AACSB; ACCA; ABET
- Academic affiliations: ASAIHL; AUN; CIMA; EM; FUIW; iCUBE; UMAP
- Chairperson: Romaizah Mohd Salleh
- Chancellor: Sultan Hassanal Bolkiah
- Vice-Chancellor: Hazri Kifle
- Pro-Chancellor: Crown Prince Al-Muhtadee Billah
- Students: 4,368 (2018)
- Undergraduates: 84% (2015)
- Postgraduates: 16% (2015)
- Location: Jalan Tungku Link, BE1410, Brunei Darussalam; 4.97646°N 114.895°E
- Campus: Regional
- Colours: Blue, green, red, yellow
- Website: www.ubd.edu.bn

The Universiti Brunei Darussalam (UBD or University of Brunei Darussalam) is a public national research university situated in Bandar Seri Begawan, the capital of Brunei, was founded in 1985 and is the oldest institution in the country. Nine research institutes, six academic service centres, and eight academic faculties make up the institution.

== History ==
The institution, which officially opened on 28 October 1985, was an example of the government's efforts to provide higher education to as many members of the populace as possible. With the two faculties that have been established, close to 200 students have enrolled. A combination of foreign and Bruneian lecturers work at the university. The Sultan Hassanal Bolkiah Institute of Education and the university were merged in 1988.

In its inaugural class, the institution took in 176 students when it was created. At UBD, since then, there has been a growth in graduate studies, a rise in the number of graduates, the addition of new academic programs, and an improvement in infrastructure. The university relocated to Tungku Link, a location that was favourable for research and learning, in 1995. The Sultan Omar 'Ali Saifuddien Centre for Islamic Studies was formed in 1999 by the merger of the Institute of Islamic Studies and the Faculty of Islamic Studies.

The GenNEXT Program, an educational framework created to help students succeed based on their unique learning styles, was launched by UBD in 2009. As part of the GenNEXT Program, UBD launched the Discovery Year program in 2011. Under this program, all students must take a year off from school.

In 2015, UBD underwent significant redevelopment, with several new developments either completed or planned under 9th National Development Plan (RKN9) and RKN10. These projects included the Finance and Islamic Bank Management Centre, Information Communication Technology Building, Medical Institute Building, and expansions to various facilities such as the Administration Block, Health and Science Building, Student Affairs Building, and Library. Other developments included a new Science Faculty Building, Phase 1 of a Lecture Theatre Complex, Phase 2 of the Sports Complex, and the establishment of the Institute for Leadership, Innovation and Advancement.

== Organisation and administration ==
Undergraduate full-time programs at UBD have particular admission criteria. Candidates need to have completed at least one of the following English proficiency requirements: grades B in IGCSE English (as a Second Language), grades C6 in English language at the GCE 'O' Level Examination, grades 6.0 in IELTS, a minimum overall score of 550 on the TOEFL, or Band B2 on the UBD English Proficiency Test. For these programs, the length of study is eight semesters, or four years of full-time study.

=== Governance ===
UBD is constituted by the Universiti Brunei Darussalam Act as a body corporate with a continuous succession made up of the Senate, Council, and members of the Chancellor, Pro Chancellor, and Vice-Chancellor. This entity is authorised to have a common seal, to use it, and to alter or establish new seals as needed. In compliance with laws and regulations, it has the authority to acquire, accept, and keep property—whether mobile or immovable—by acquisition, exchange, gift, donation, lease, testamentary disposal, or other methods. Furthermore, the university may dispose of any such property by sale, mortgage, lease, exchange, or other means. In addition, it is in charge of carrying out all tasks and responsibilities mandated or granted by laws, rules, and the Act.

The following are the chancellery roles at UBD:

- Chancellor
- Pro Chancellor
- Vice-Chancellor
- Assistant Vice-Chancellor (Global Engagement)
- Assistant Vice-Chancellor (Education)
- Assistant Vice-Chancellor (Research, Innovation and Sustainability)
- Assistant Vice-Chancellor (Industry Engagement and Enterprise Development)
- Assistant Vice-Chancellor (University Life and Governance)

=== Academic faculties ===
UBD encompasses 10 academic faculties, 7 research institutes and 2 service faculties. These include the Academy of Brunei Studies (APB), the Faculty of Arts and Social Sciences (FASS), the Faculty of Integrated Technologies (FIT), the Faculty of Science (FOS), the Institute of Policy Studies (IPS), the Sultan Hassanal Bolkiah Institute of Education (SHBIE), the School of Digital Sciences (SDS), the Pengiran Anak Puteri Rashidah Sa'adatul Bolkiah Institute of Health Sciences (PAPRSB IHS), and the UBD School of Business and Economics (UBDSBE), the Faculty of Military Studies.

Research institutions at UBD include the Centre for Advanced Material and Energy Sciences (CAMES), the Centre for Advance Research (CARe), and the Institute of Asian Studies (IAS), the Institute of Applied Data Analytics (IADA), the Institute for Biodiversity and Environmental Research (IBER), the Institute for Leadership, Innovation and Advancement (ILIA), the Sultan Omar 'Ali Saifuddien Centre for Islamic Studies (SOASCIS).

The two service faculties are UBD Language Centre and the Centre for Life Long Learning (C3L)

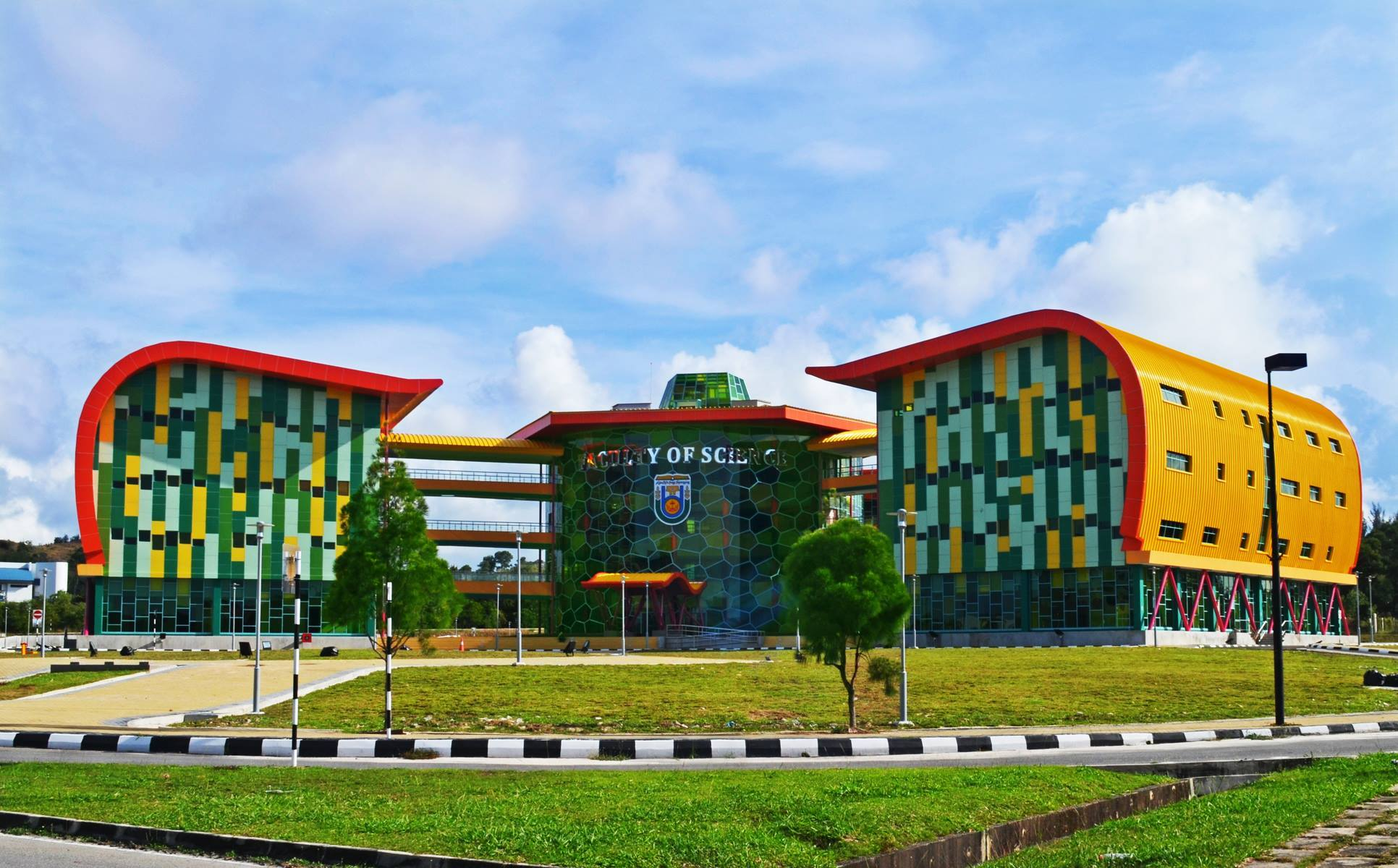
Faculty of Science

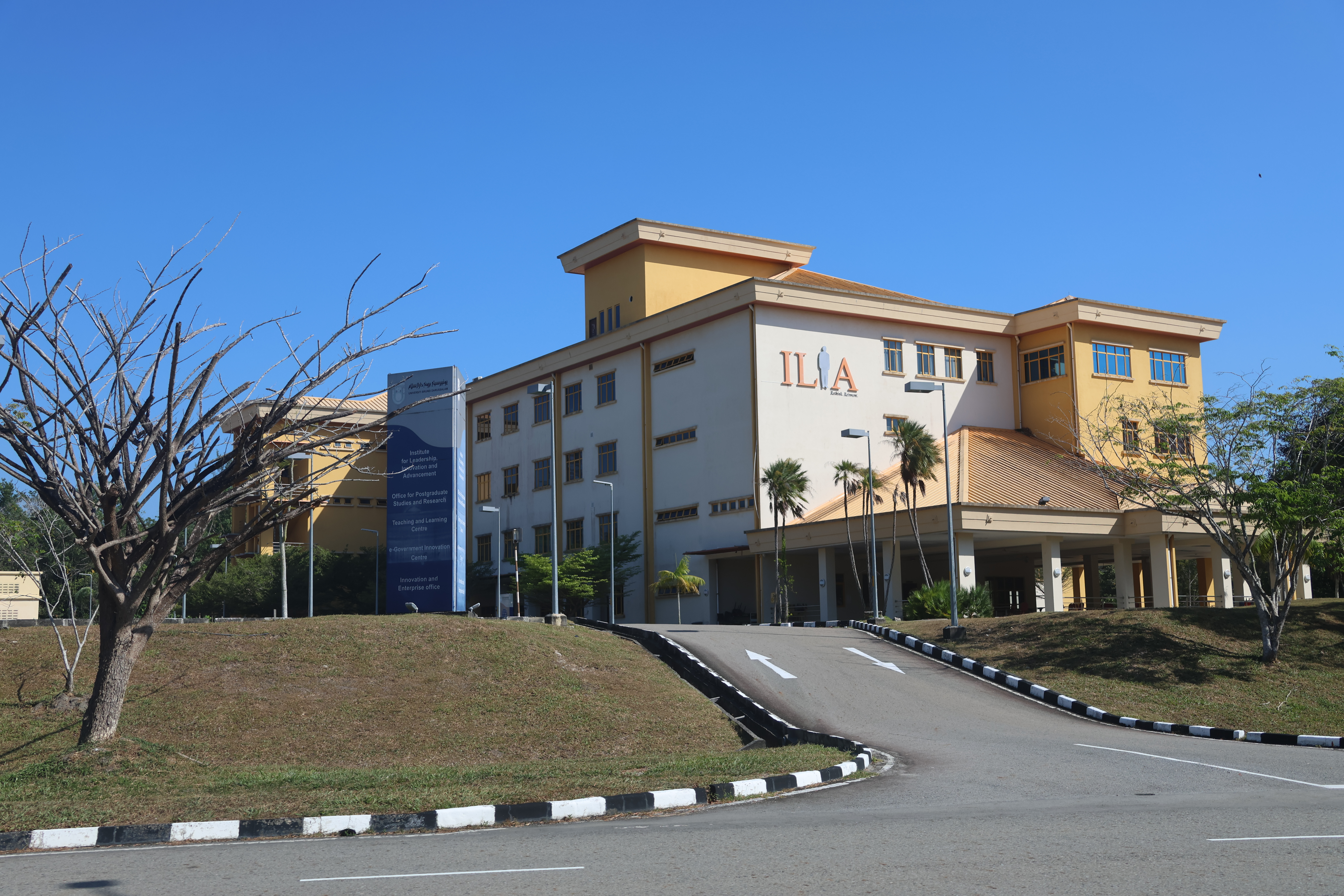
Institute for Leadership, Innovation and Advancement

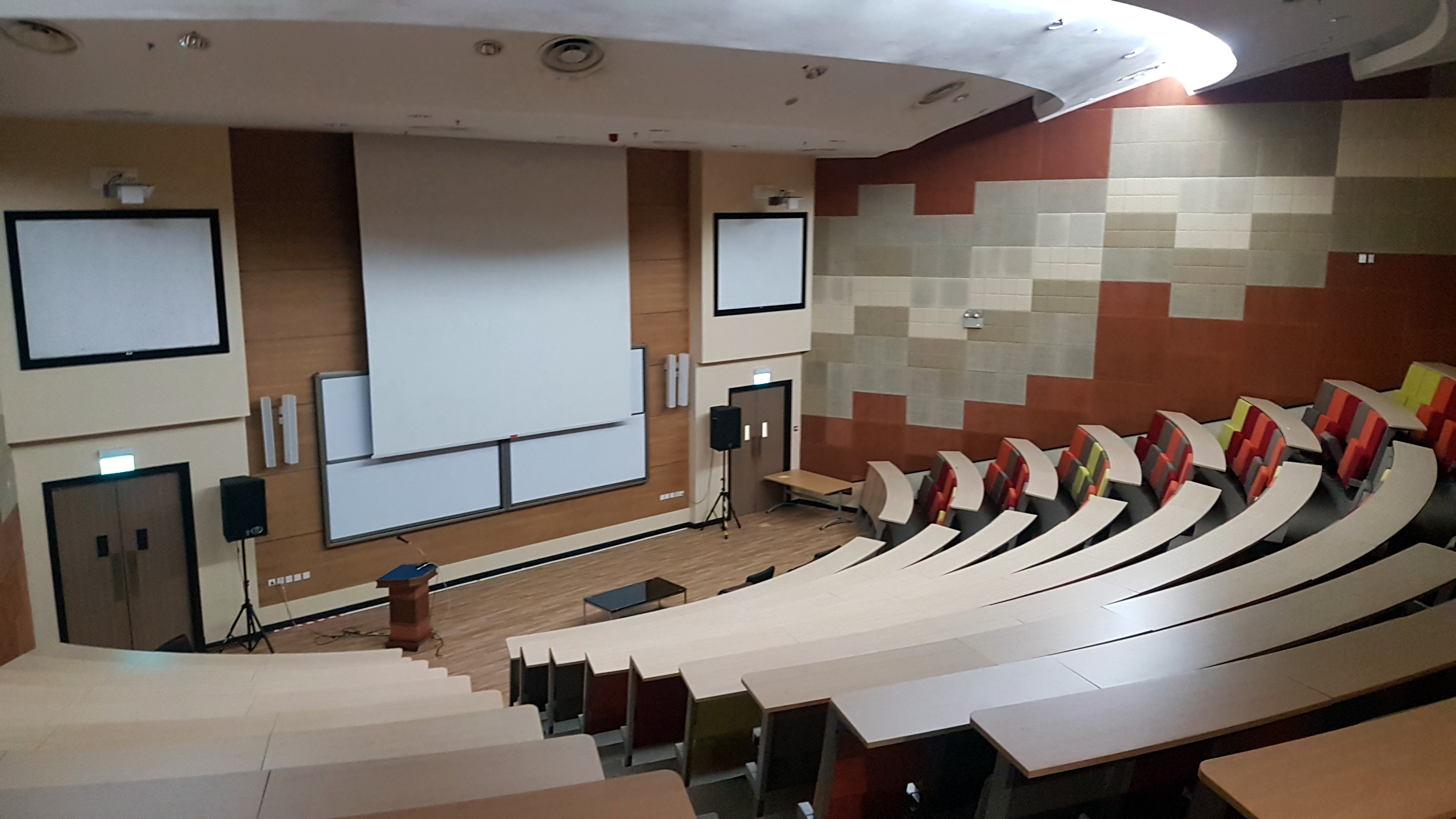
Pengiran Anak Puteri Rashidah Sa'adatul Bolkiah Institute of Health Sciences

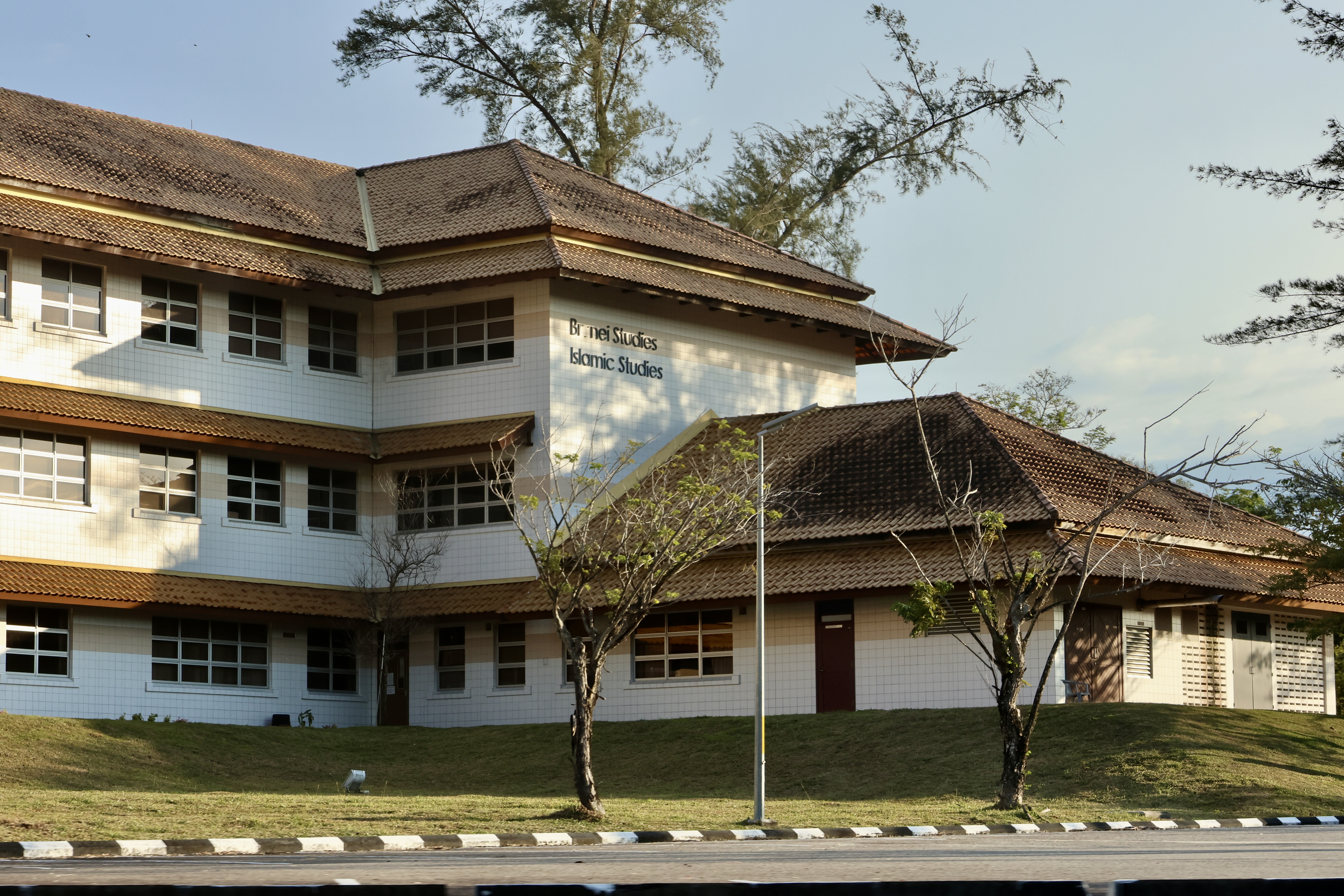
Sultan Omar 'Ali Saifuddien Centre for Islamic Studies

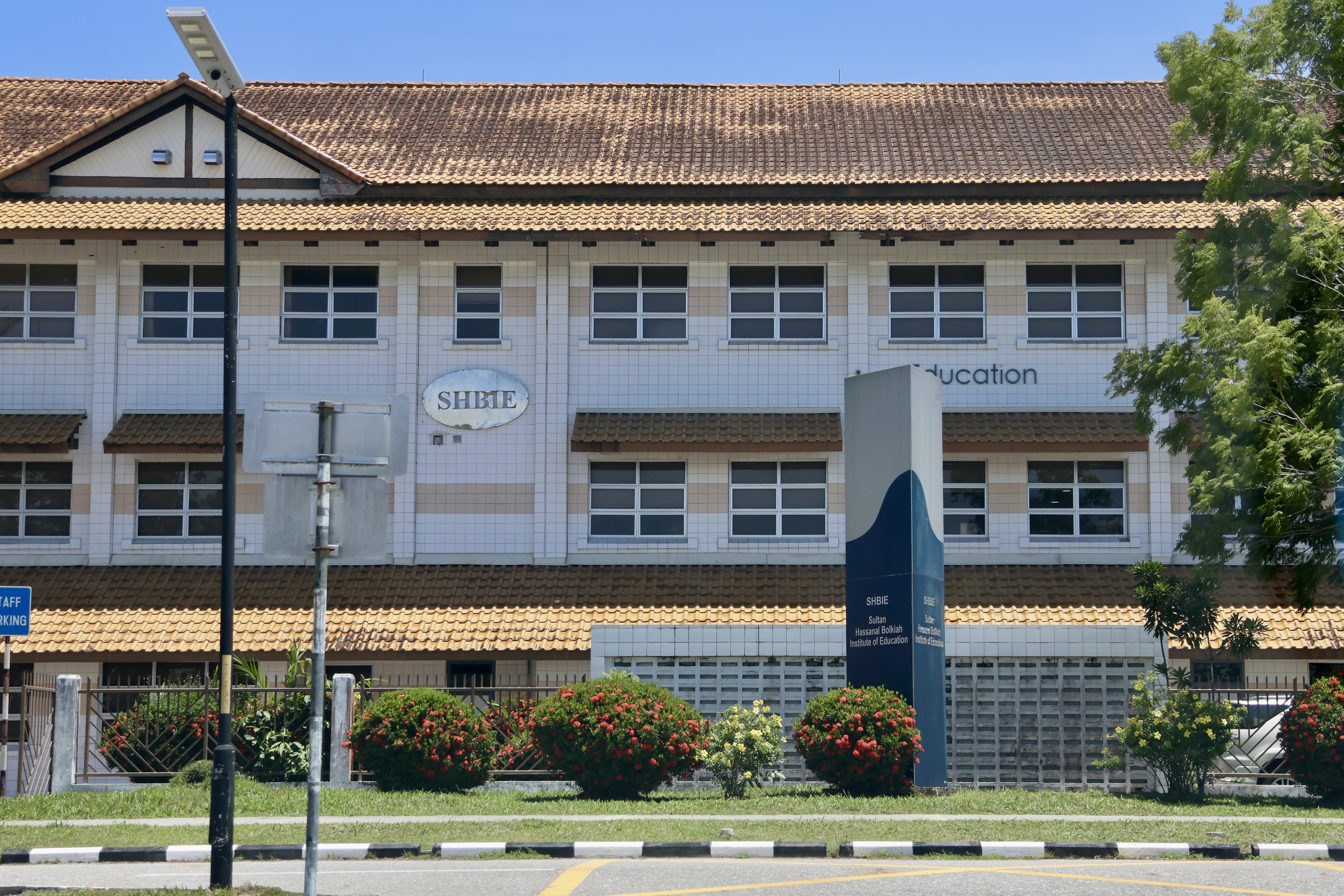
Sultan Hassanal Bolkiah Institute of Education

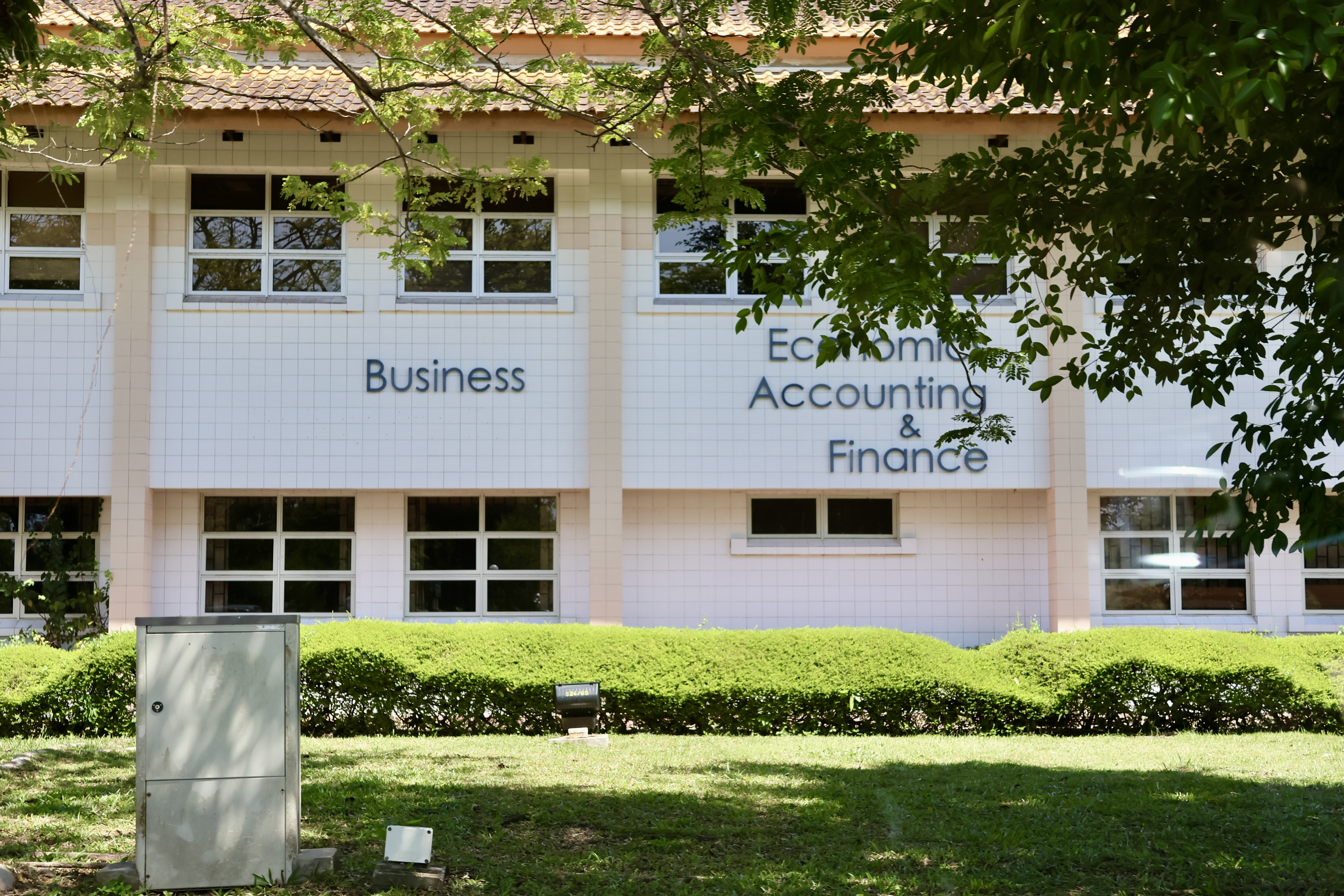
UBD School of Business and Economics

=== Programmes ===
At UBD, undergraduate studies include the University Bridging Programme (Unibridge) offered by the Centre for Lifelong Learning. Students can pursue a Bachelor of Digital Science at the SDS. The PAPRSB IHS offers various Bachelor of Health Science programs, with majors in Nursing, Midwifery, Pharmacy, Biomedical Science, Dentistry, and Medicine. The FIT provides a Bachelor of Engineering, while the UBDSBE offers a Bachelor of Business. Additionally, the FOS offers a Bachelor of Science.

Graduate-level courses at UBD comprise a range of programs offered by many faculties. Both a Master of Philosophy and a Doctor of Research are available from the SOASCIS. The SHBIE offers a PhD in philosophy in addition to a Master by Research and a Master by Coursework. A Master of Philosophy and a Doctor of Research are available from the SDS. The UBDSBE also offers a Doctor of Philosophy, a Master of Coursework, and a Master by Research.

In the UK, the postgraduate Membership of the Royal College of General Practitioners (MRCGP) qualification is a leading global standard of assessment for primary care physicians. It was created to guarantee a high degree of competency in patient care, as demonstrated by scientific knowledge, clinical skills, attitudes, values, and leadership abilities. The Ministry of Health (MoH) and PAPRSB IHS work together to organise the MRCGP International Examinations in Brunei. The Clinical Skills Assessment (CSA), also known as the objective structured clinical examination (OSCE), and the Applied Knowledge Test (AKT) are the two sections of the MRCGP test. As in previous years, physicians from the Ministry of Defence (MinDef), the MoH, and private practices from Brunei, Malaysia, Singapore, and Saudi Arabia were among the participants in 2007.

== Academic profile ==
=== Rankings ===
University rankings

Global – Overall
- QS World: =367 (2026)
- THE World: 401–500 (2024)
- USNWR Global: 832 (2025)

Regional – Overall
- QS Asia: 17 (2025)
- THE Asia: 125 (2024)
- USNWR Asia: 255 (2025)

In the most recent Times Higher Education (THE) Best Small Universities in the World 2023 ranking, UBD came in at 16th. To be qualified for this category, listed colleges need to have fewer than 5,000 students and offer more than four courses. In the meantime, it ranked second in the area and 68th globally among institutions under 50, according to the THE Young University Rankings 2023. In the THE World University 2023 Rankings, it moved up from the 351–400 place to the 301–350 rank. It also improved in the 2023 THE Asia University Rankings, moving up from 62 to 60.

According to the QS World University Rankings as of 3 January 2024, UBD is placed 387th in the world and the 71st in the QS Asia University Rankings. UBD is ranked among the top 401–500 universities worldwide by THE. THE also placed UBD topics in the top 301–400 worldwide in the social sciences, engineering and technology, and education, in the top 401–500 worldwide in business and economics, and in the top 501–600 worldwide in the physical sciences. Out of more than 1,200 institutions, UBD came in at 629th place in the QS Sustainability rating, which places it first in the country and 162nd in Asia.

In the 2023–2024 academic year, there are 236 students registered; of them, 28 are studying PhDs, 123 are seeking Master's degrees, 68 are pursuing degrees, and 28 are enrolled in the UniBridge program.

=== International partnerships ===
UBD is involved in multilateral collaborations in addition to bilateral ones. As a result, over time, a number of regional and global networks, including as ASEAN University Network (AUN), Borneo Studies Network (BSN), Brunei–US English Language Enrichment Project for ASEAN (Brunei–U.S. ELEP), Erasmus Mundus (EM), International Consortium of Universities for the Study of Biodiversity and the Environment (iCUBE), Southeast Asian Ministers of Education Organization (SEAMEO), Association of Southeast Asian Institutions of Higher Learning (ASAIHL), and University Mobility in Asia and the Pacific (UMAP), have been created and maintained.

UBD is a partner of several organisations consisting of Go Rush Express, Elsevier, Education University of Hong Kong (EdUHK), Economic Research Institute for ASEAN and East Asia (ERIA), City University of Hong Kong (CityUHK), Zhejiang University (ZJU), Federation of Islamic World Universities (FUIW), International Centre for Education in Islamic Finance (INCEIF), Peking University HSBC Business School (PHBS), Nijmegen School of Management (NSM), Silpakorn University Faculty of Management (MSSU), Association of Chartered Certified Accountants (ACCA), Association to Advance Collegiate Schools of Business (AACSB), Accreditation Board for Engineering and Technology (ABET) and Chartered Institute of Management Accountants (CIMA).

UBDSBE and a number of other universities have formed worldwide research and teaching partnerships. UBDSBE and Osaka University cooperated in Japan from April to September 2021. The Guilin University of Electronic Technology partnership took conducted in China between 21 and 26 August 2021. Furthermore, from September to December 2021, UBDSBE collaborated with the Faculty of Economics and Business at Universitas Padjadjaran in Indonesia.

== Student life ==
The counselling section of the Student Affairs section (HEP) division of UBD offers counselling services. Students who willingly seek help as well as those who are referred to them for a variety of academic and personal reasons can get counselling services from two licensed counsellors.

=== International students ===
UBD opened its doors to international students from its inception. Over the years, there has been an increase in diversity, with many students coming from East Asia (China and Japan), Europe, Africa and the Middle East. Today, UBD offers a range of programmes to enhance international relations, such as the Brunei-US Enrichment Programme for ASEAN and the Discovery Year programme, which encourages students to go abroad during the third year of their undergraduate programme.

=== Residential colleges ===
The more contemporary apartment-style dormitory, The Core Residential College (also known as The Core), is located on campus. Five separate study/bedrooms with air conditioning and a communal living room, kitchen, bathroom, and laundry area make up one apartment unit. The only housing option available to international students on the university campus is the Core, whether they are exchange or undergraduate students. The Core is accessible for students with special needs thanks to wheelchair ramps and Braille plates. These students get first choice for accommodations on the lowest floor. The Core has an ATM that serves Baiduri, TAIB, and BIBD users. Apart from that, the Core has two discussion rooms that can hold up to fifty people each and may be rented. The public is welcome to utilise a surau located on the first floor of the Core.

When Deluxe Hostel opened its doors in 1985, it brought the renovated Hostel Residential College Blocks, which featured a contemporary blend of the past, present, and future. The "Deluxe Hostel" has a common room, dining area, kitchen, balcony, surau, and public restrooms. There were a total of three blocks for male students and a total of 6 blocks for female students in the male/female residential college. College residents share a multipurpose hall, exercise room, laundry room, canteen, and prayer room. The M4 residential flat has its own dining table, kitchen, living area, and bathrooms, all completely furnished with contemporary furnishings.

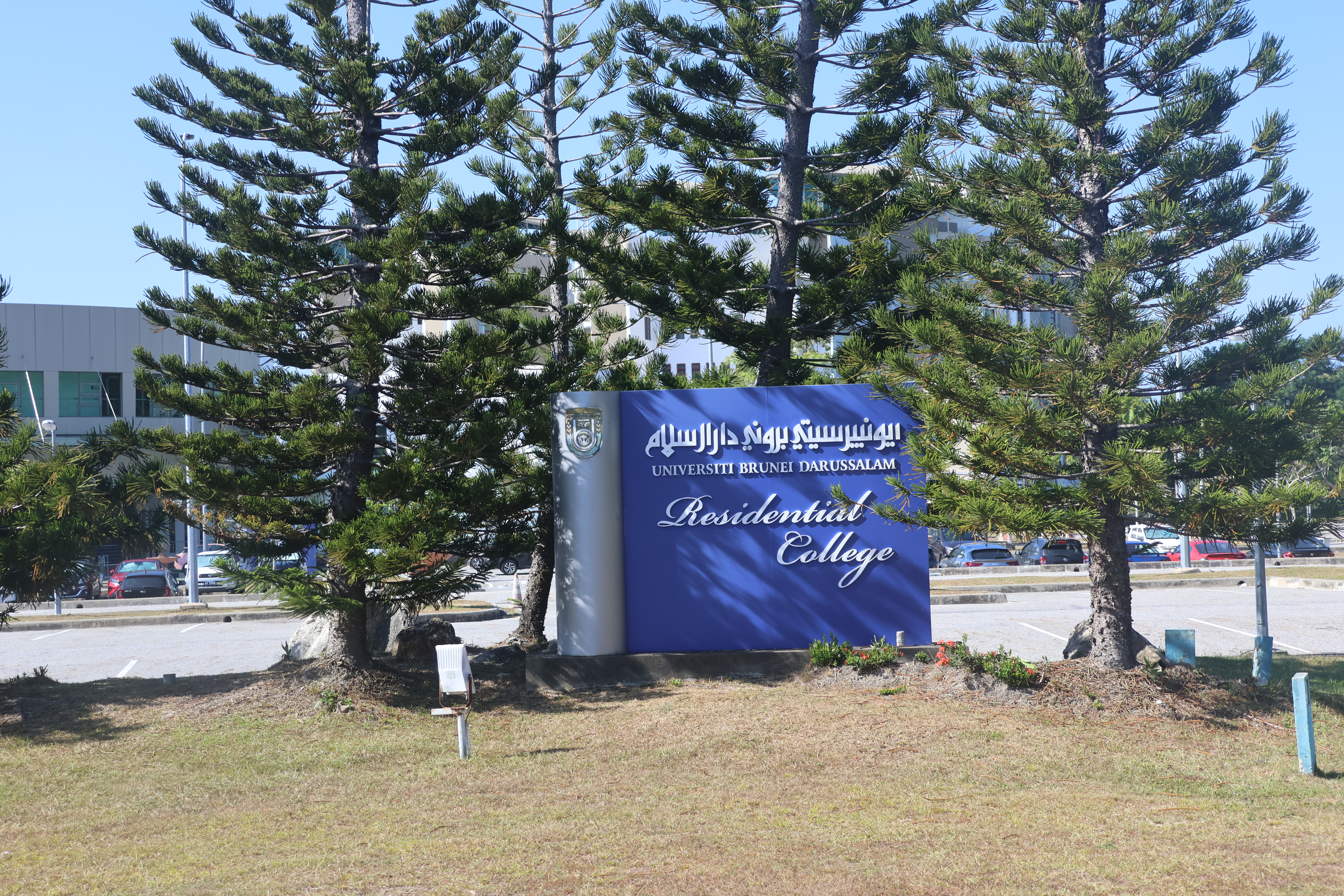
The Core entrance sign

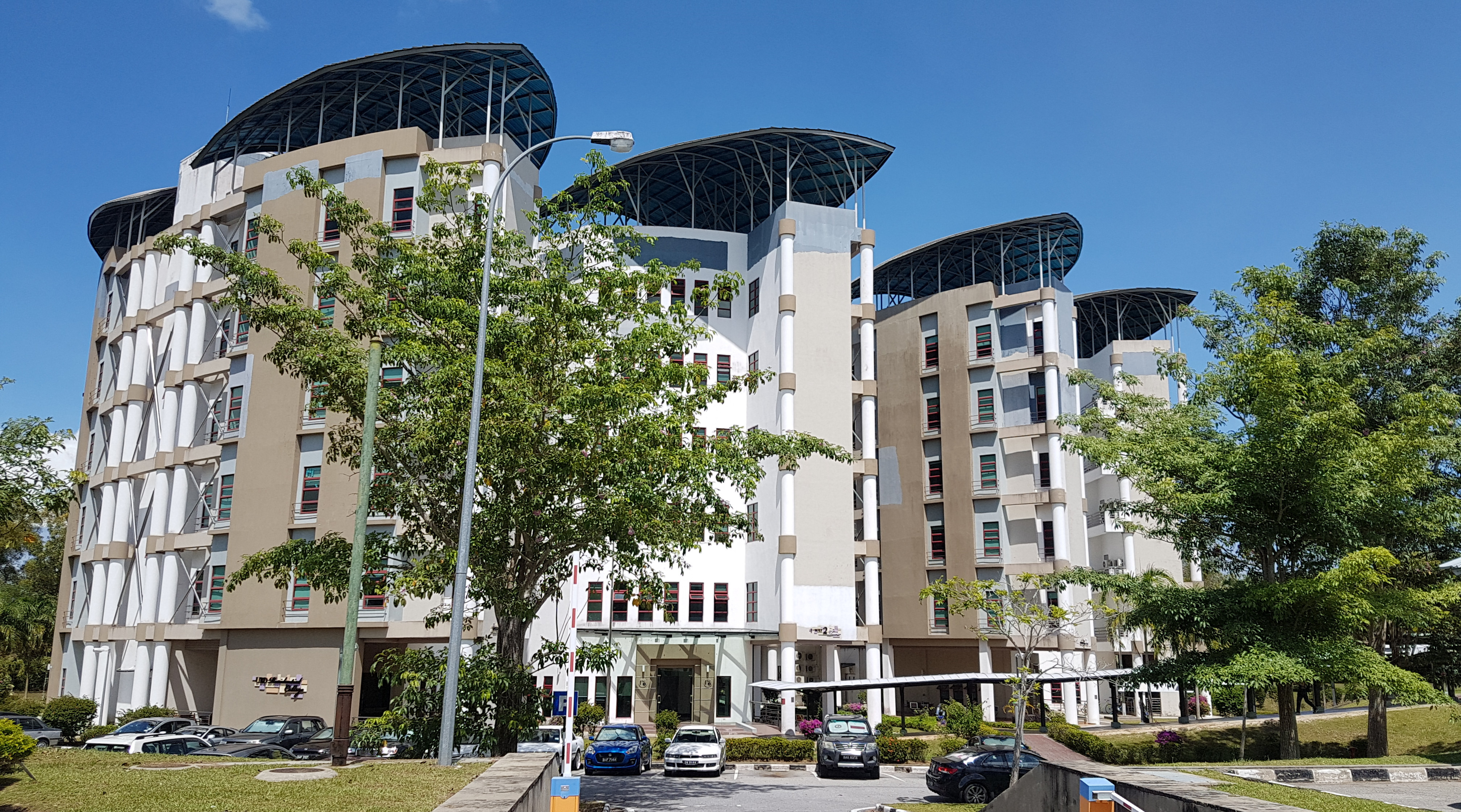
The Core buildings

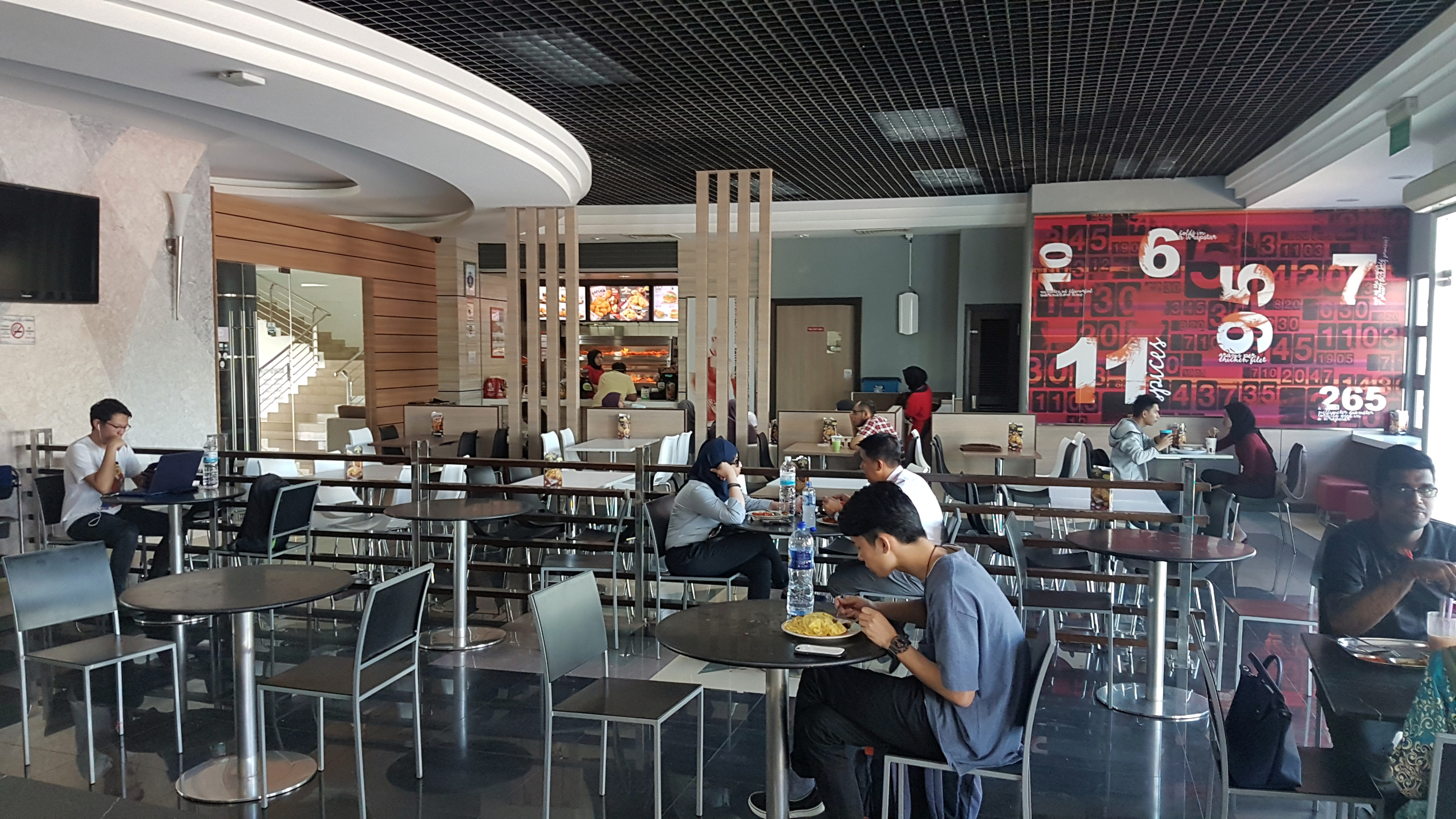
The Core food court

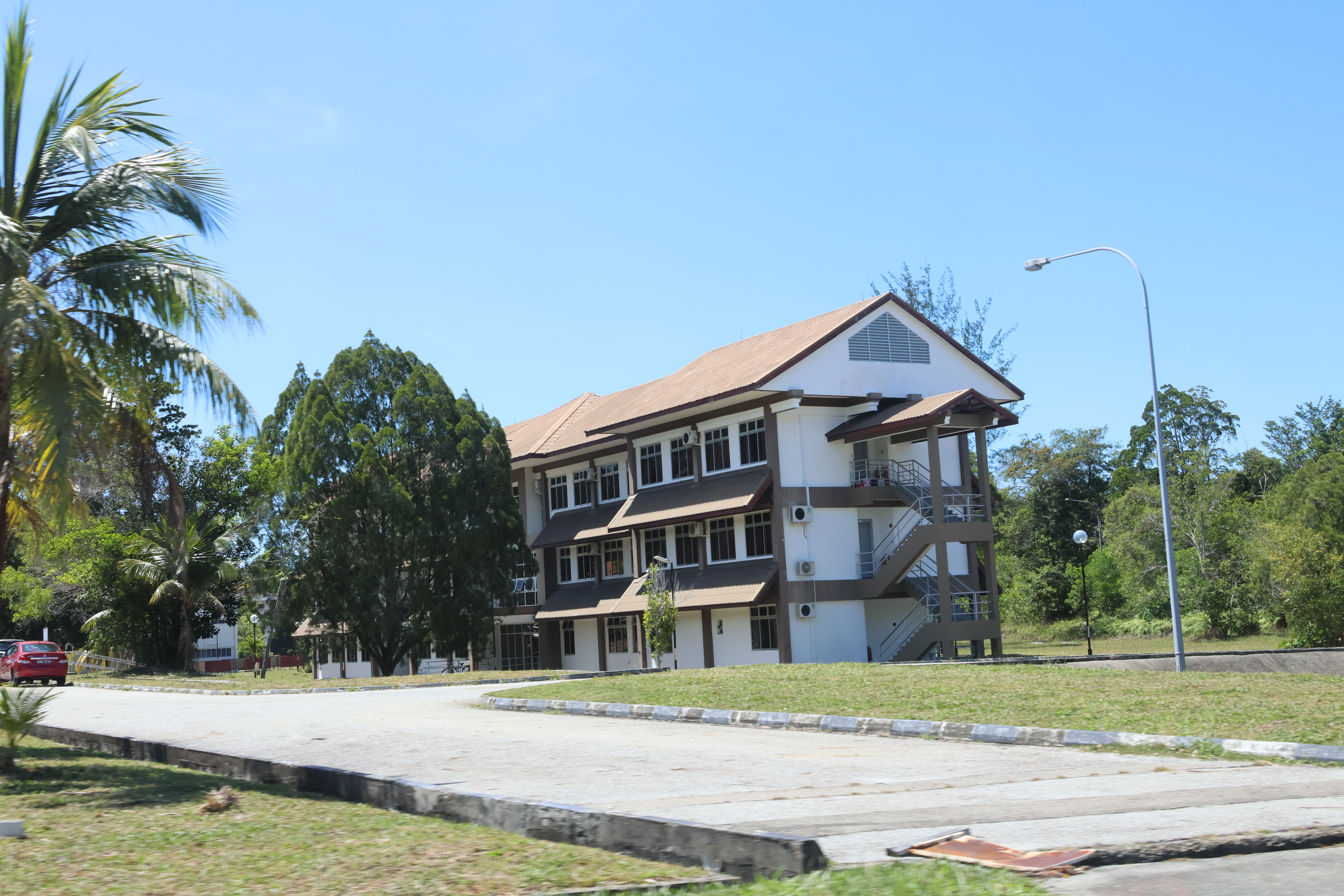
Male residential college

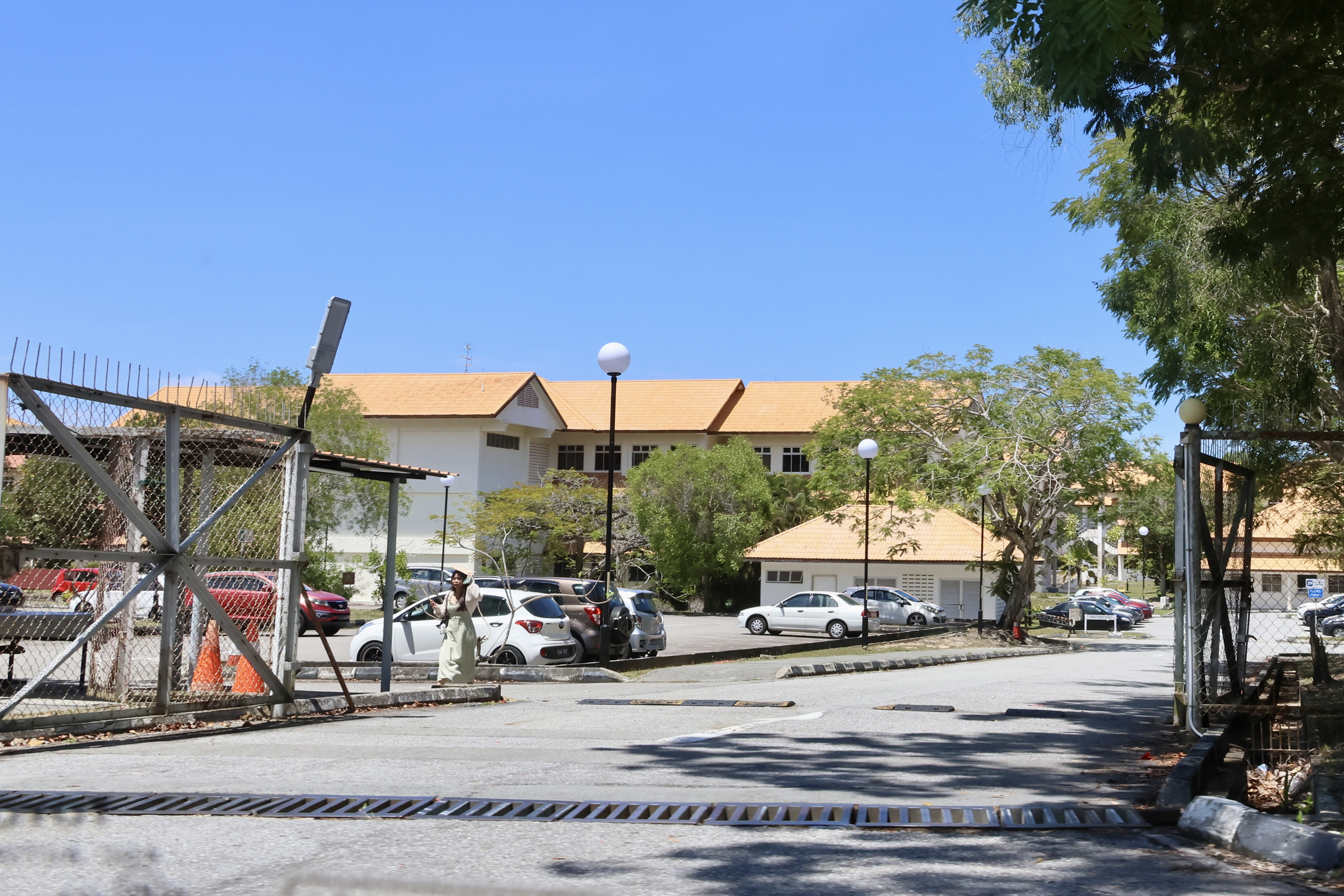
Female residential college

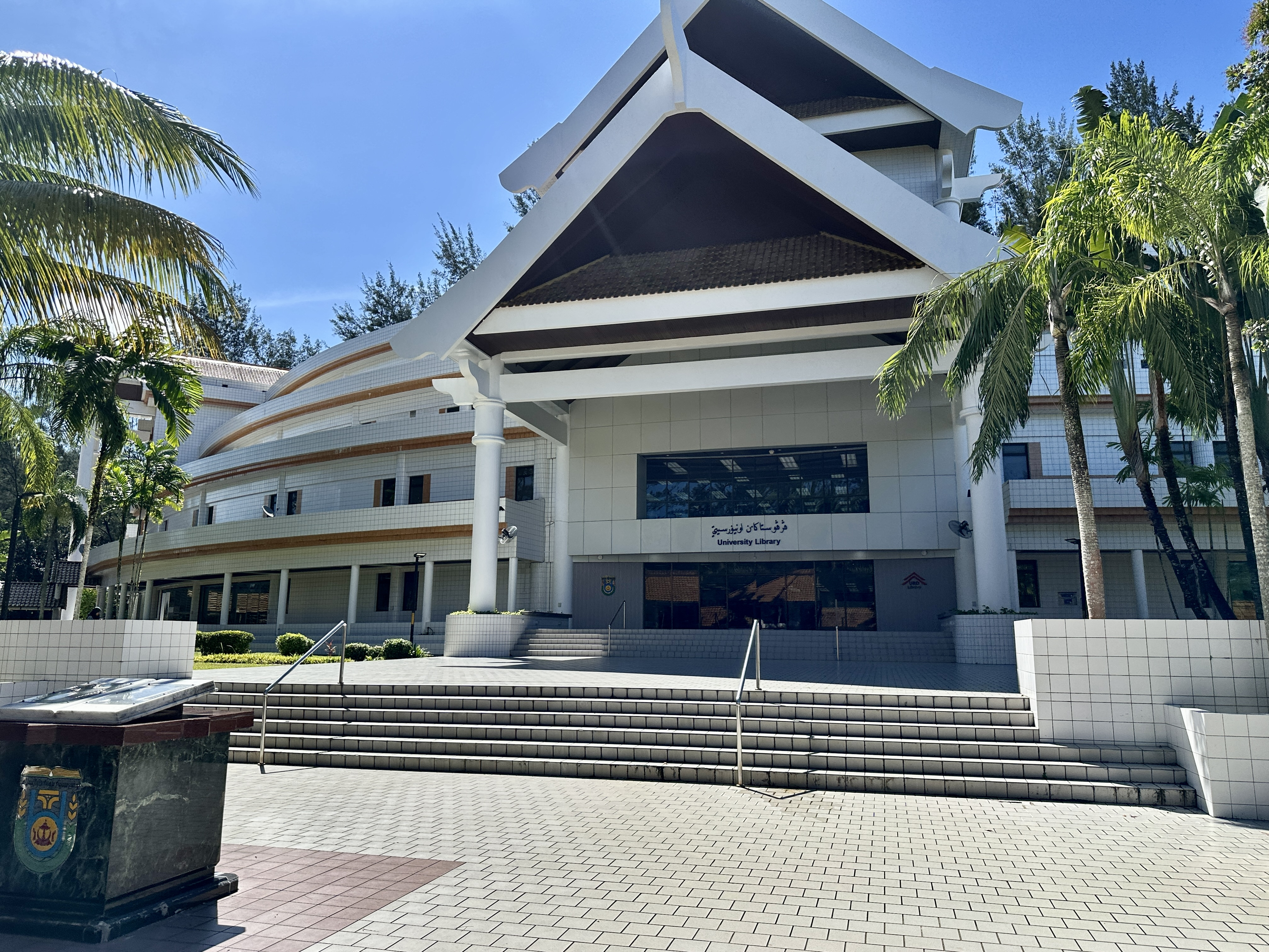
University Library

=== Chancellor's Trophy ===
Since its founding in 2021, the Chancellor's Trophy aims to encourage the expansion of sports, rivalries, and friendships among Brunei's public and private higher education institutions. The Chancellor's Trophy also highlights the leaders of the separate student councils and the university working together. The winner of the Chancellor's Trophy 2022 was UBD, with Universiti Islam Sultan Sharif Ali (UNISSA) coming in second and Universiti Teknologi Brunei (UTB) in third.

== Campus ==
=== UBD IBM Centre ===
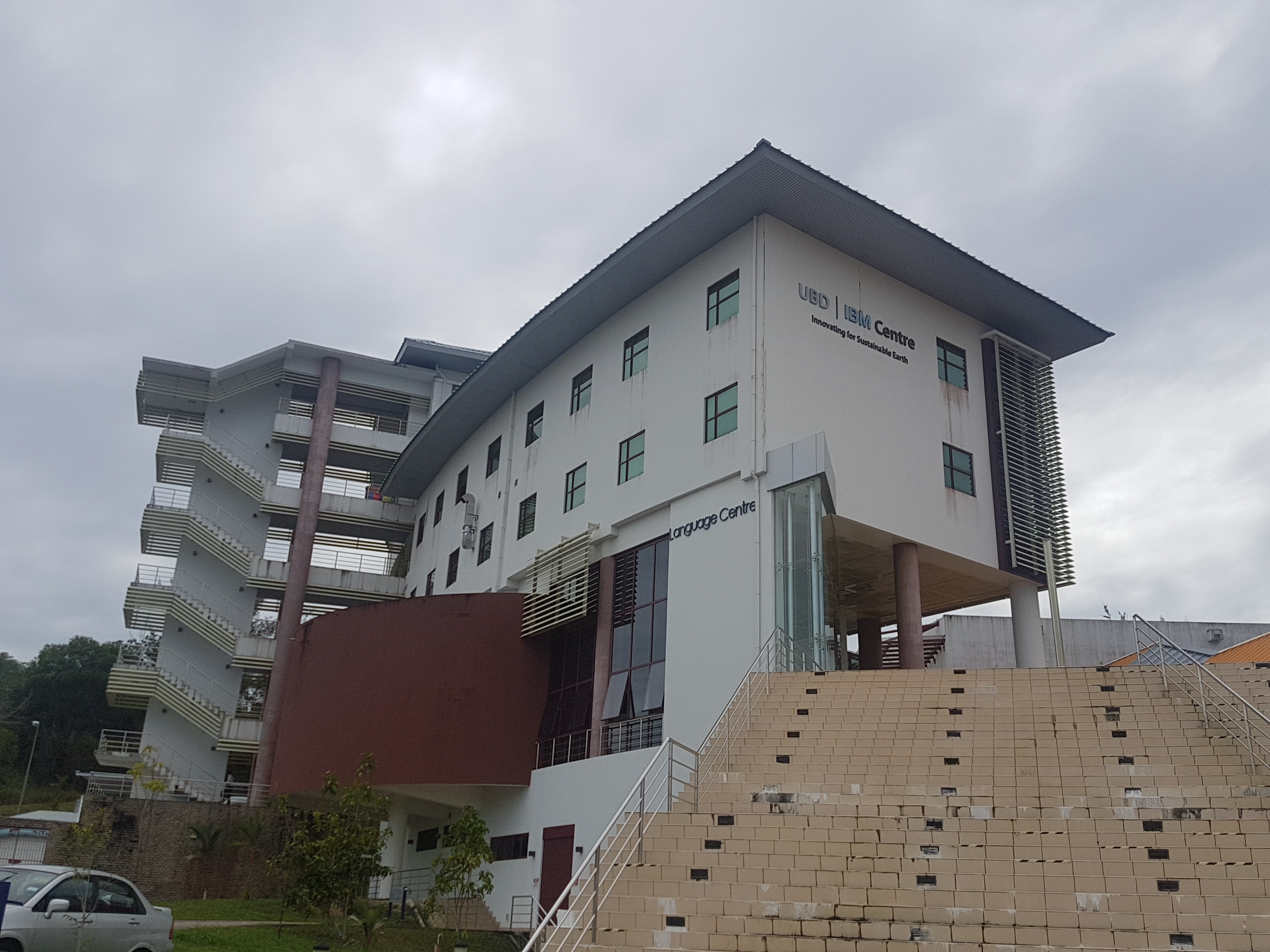
UBD IBM Centre

International Business Machines (IBM) and UBD collaborate on research projects through the UBD IBM Centre (previously known as UBD-IBM Research Institute). On 15 October 2011, Sultan Hassanal Bolkiah inaugurated the centre. In accordance with the agreement that the Sultan first made public in September 2010, scientists from IBM and UBD collaborated to create climate models based on local climate data. These models integrated hydrological models into weather models, enabling the prediction of floods and the effects of climate change on rainforests. As a result of this collaboration, Brunei is home to the first IBM Blue Gene supercomputer in Southeast Asia.

=== UBD Botanical Research Centre ===
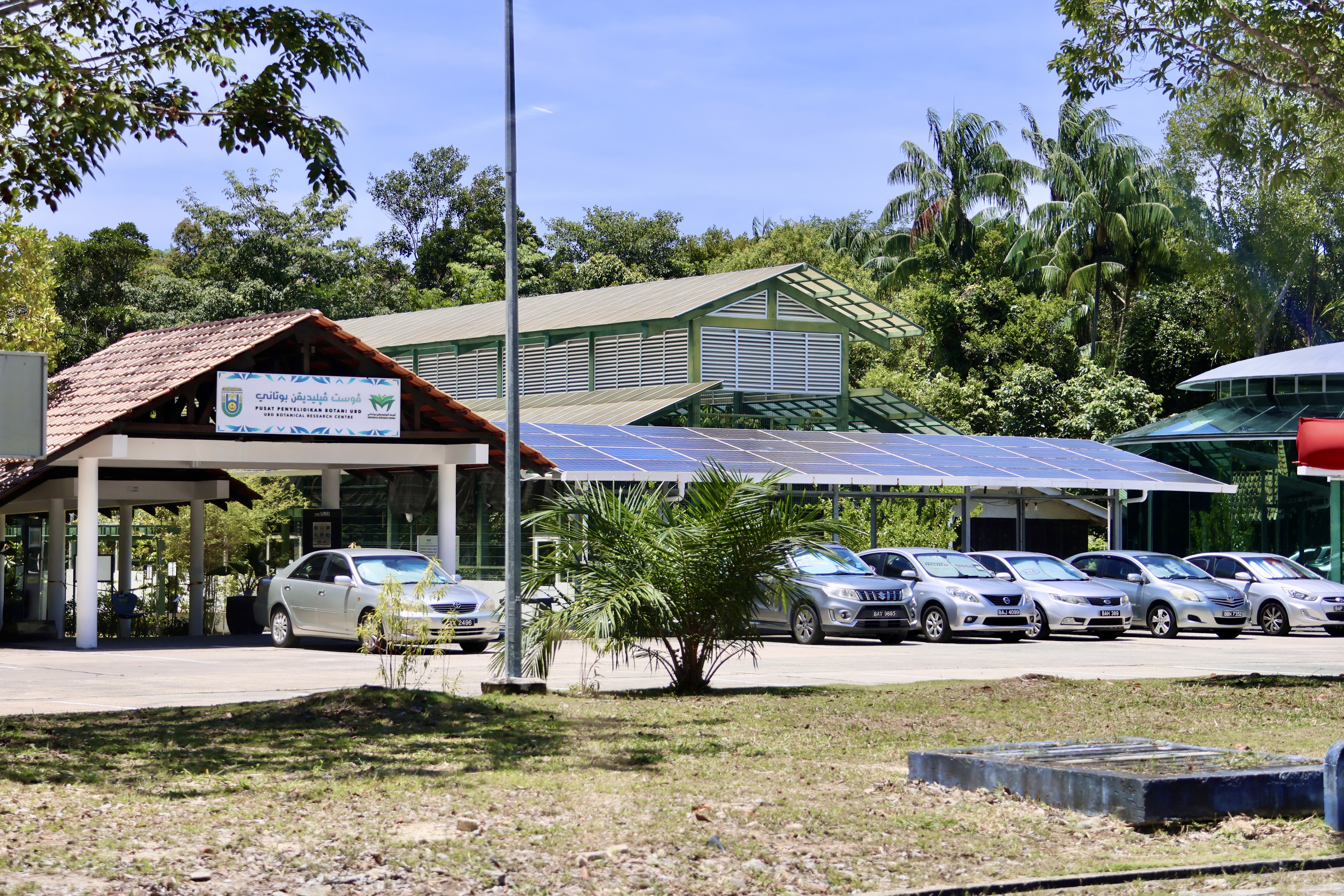
UBD Botanical Research Centre

Located on the UBD campus amid an area of undisturbed heath woodland, the Universiti Brunei Darussalam Botanical Research Centre (UBD BRC) was originally established in 2013. On 3 February 2018, the UBD BRC was opened by Sultan Hassanal Bolkiah, in commemoration of the UBD-organised First International Symposium on "Ethnobotany in the Qur'an and Hadith - An Exploration." This made UBD BRC the nation's first botanical garden. The botanical garden focuses on study, teaching, and protection of the country's flora. It is home to more than five hundred varieties of tropical plants, many of which are indigenous to Borneo and Brunei. Under the direction of UBD's IBER, the UBD BRC conducts research, focuses on research, and is a member of Botanic Gardens Conservation International (BGCI).

The UBD BRC is a 6 hectares (15 acres) site that is situated in a tropical lowland heath forest that the locals refer to as Kerangas forest. The Iban term "Kerangas" denotes territory where hill rice is unable to thrive, signifying the deficient nutritional content of the soil in heath forests. Less than 1% of Brunei's forests are Kerangas forests, which are extremely uncommon. Kerangas forests are more susceptible to forest fires due to their drier ecosystems. Additionally, invasive species like Acacia trees can invade damaged Kerangas forests.

High conservation significance native species found in Kerangas woods include Gymnostoma nobile and Agathis borneensis, which are regarded as indicators of pristine Kerangas forests. More than 500 species of tropical plants, majority of which are indigenous to Brunei and Borneo, are now housed in the live collections at the UBD BRC. The UBD BRC, a research centre dedicated to native plant conservation, collaborates closely with regional partners and stakeholders to support Brunei's efforts to realise Wawasan Brunei 2035 and the Sustainable Development Goals 25 (Life on Land) and 23 (Climate Action).

=== University Mosque ===
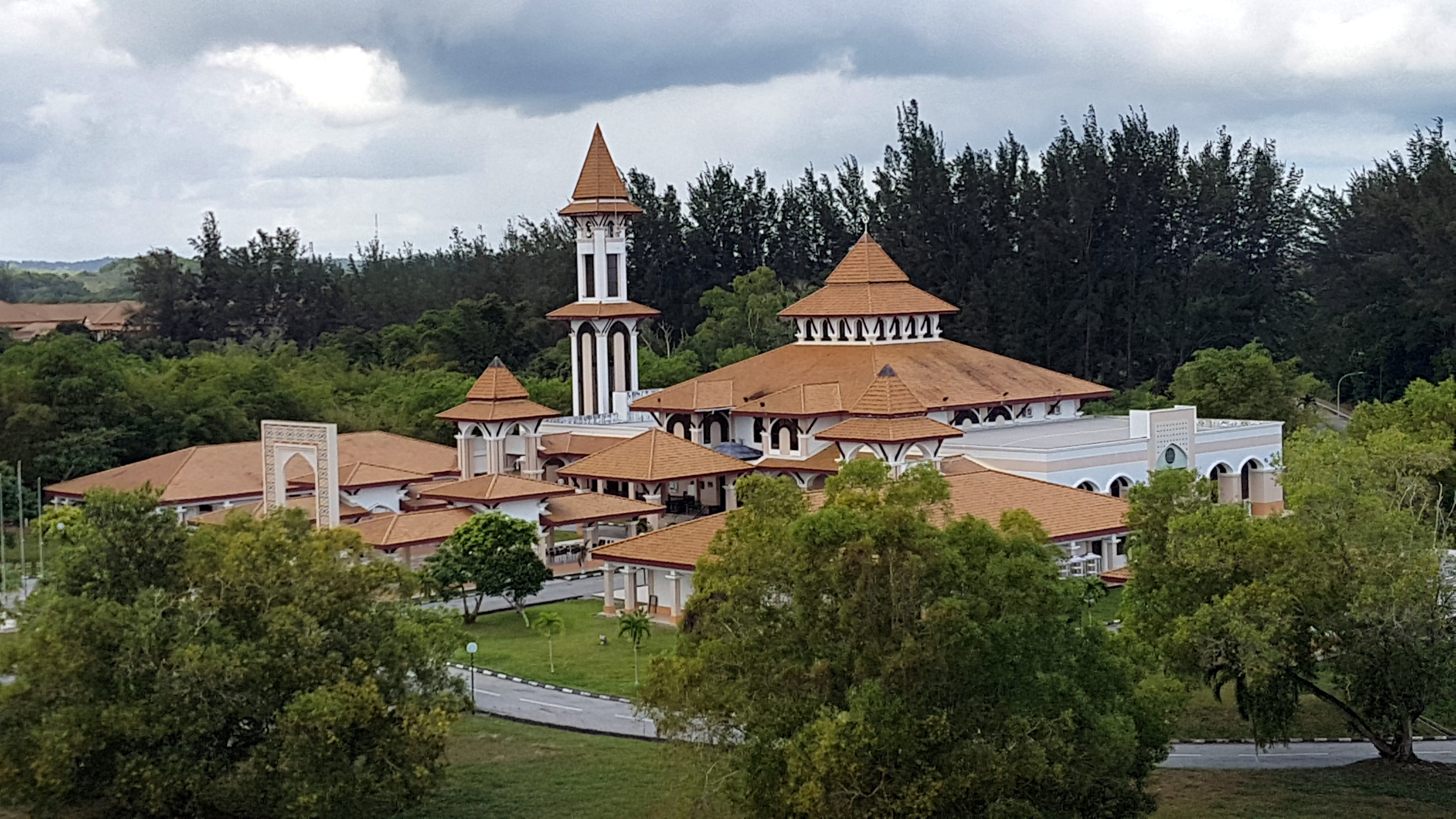
University Mosque in 2019

At a total cost of $7,600,000, construction on the University Mosque (Masjid Universiti) or Universiti Brunei Darussalam Mosque (Masjid Universiti Brunei Darussalam) began in 1992 and was finished in 1994. Sultan Hassanal Bolkiah formally inaugurated the mosque in 1995. It can accommodate 1800 people. In addition to hosting daily prayers for Muslim students and the community, the mosque is primarily utilised by the institution for religious events.

=== Other facilities ===
There are several retail establishments on campus. A 6-seater vehicle is used for a shuttle service that runs Monday through Saturday from 9 am to 3:30 pm, first come, first served. Routes to Rimba Point and The Mall are covered by this service. The food court provides a range of meals and beverages to both students and the local community through three food stalls and one fast-food restaurant. Fully furnished with multimedia capabilities, the lecture hall can hold up to 208 people and may be rented for a full or half day. Arkitek Idris designed and the UBD Chancellor Hall was finished in 2002.

== Notable people ==
=== Vice-Chancellors ===
- 1985–1986: Pehin Dato Abdul Aziz Umar
- 1986–1988: Pehin Dato Abdul Rahman Taib
- 1989–1990: Pehin Dato Abdul Aziz Umar
- 1991–1999: Pehin Dato Abu Bakar Apong
- 1999–2002: Dato Mahmud Saedon
- 2003–2008: Dato Ismail Duraman
- 2008–2015: Dato Zulkarnain Hanafi
- 2015–2022: Datin Anita Binurul Zahrina
- 2022–present: Hazri Kifle

=== Notable staff ===
- Osman Bakar, chair professor and director of SOASCIS at UBD
- Gibril Haddad, senior assistant professor of SOASCIS at UBD
- Reginald Hugh Hickling, lecturer in the English Language Department at UBD
- Qaiser Mushtaq, associate professor at UBD
- Keat Gin Ooi, professor in the APB at UBD
- Tariq Ramadan, eminent visiting professor at UBD
- Zohrah Sulaiman, Deputy Vice-Chancellor of UBD
- Rozan Yunos, adjunct professor in the Centre for Lifelong Learning at UBD
- Maung Zarni, associate professor of Institute of Asian Studies at UBD
- Victor Terence King, distinguished professor of Borneo Studies, Institute of Asian Studies

=== Notable alumni ===
- Khairuddin Abdul Hamid, Deputy Minister of Finance and Economy
- Ahmaddin Abdul Rahman, Minister of Home Affairs
- Abdul Mutalib, Minister of Transport and Infocommunications
- Iswandy Ahmad, advocate and member of Legislative Council of Brunei
- Khairunnisa Ash'ari, former member of the Legislative Council of Brunei
- Pengiran Bahrom, former Deputy Minister of Education and Religious Affairs
- Queenie Chong, member of Legislative Council of Brunei
- Janin Erih, permanent representative of Brunei to the United Nations in Geneva
- Zul F, singer-songwriter and actor
- Norazlianah Ibrahim, ambassador of Brunei to East Timor
- Abdul Wahab Juned, former Deputy Minister at the Prime Minister's Office
- Pengiran Krtini, ambassador of Brunei to Germany
- Lee Ying Shi, national wushu practitioner
- Masurai Masri, permanent representative of Brunei to the United Nations in Geneva
- Nazmi Mohamad, Minister of Culture, Youth and Sports
- Romaizah Mohd Salleh, Minister of Education
- Abdul Aziz Mohd Tamit, former Commander of Royal Brunei Navy
- Marzuke Mohsin, Deputy Minister of Development
- Adee Suhardee Muhidin, national football team player and club manager
- Anisah Najihah, national pencak silat practitioner
- Prince Abdul Malik
- Princess Majeedah Nuurul
- Princess Rashidah Sa'adatul
- Princess Hafizah Sururul
- Princess Muta-Wakkilah Hayatul
- Princess Masna
- Princess Sarah
- Fakhrul Razi, singer-songwriter
- Sufian Sabtu, Deputy Minister at the Prime Minister's Office
- Hamzah Sulaiman, former Minister of Education
- Noor Qamar Sulaiman, diplomat
- Abdul Rahman Taib, Speaker of Legislative Council of Brunei
- Nor Hashimah Taib, Attorney General of Brunei
- Jaspar Yu Woon Chai, Olympic badminton player
- Riza Yunos, Deputy Minister at the Prime Minister's Office
Notable Universiti Brunei Darussalam Alumni

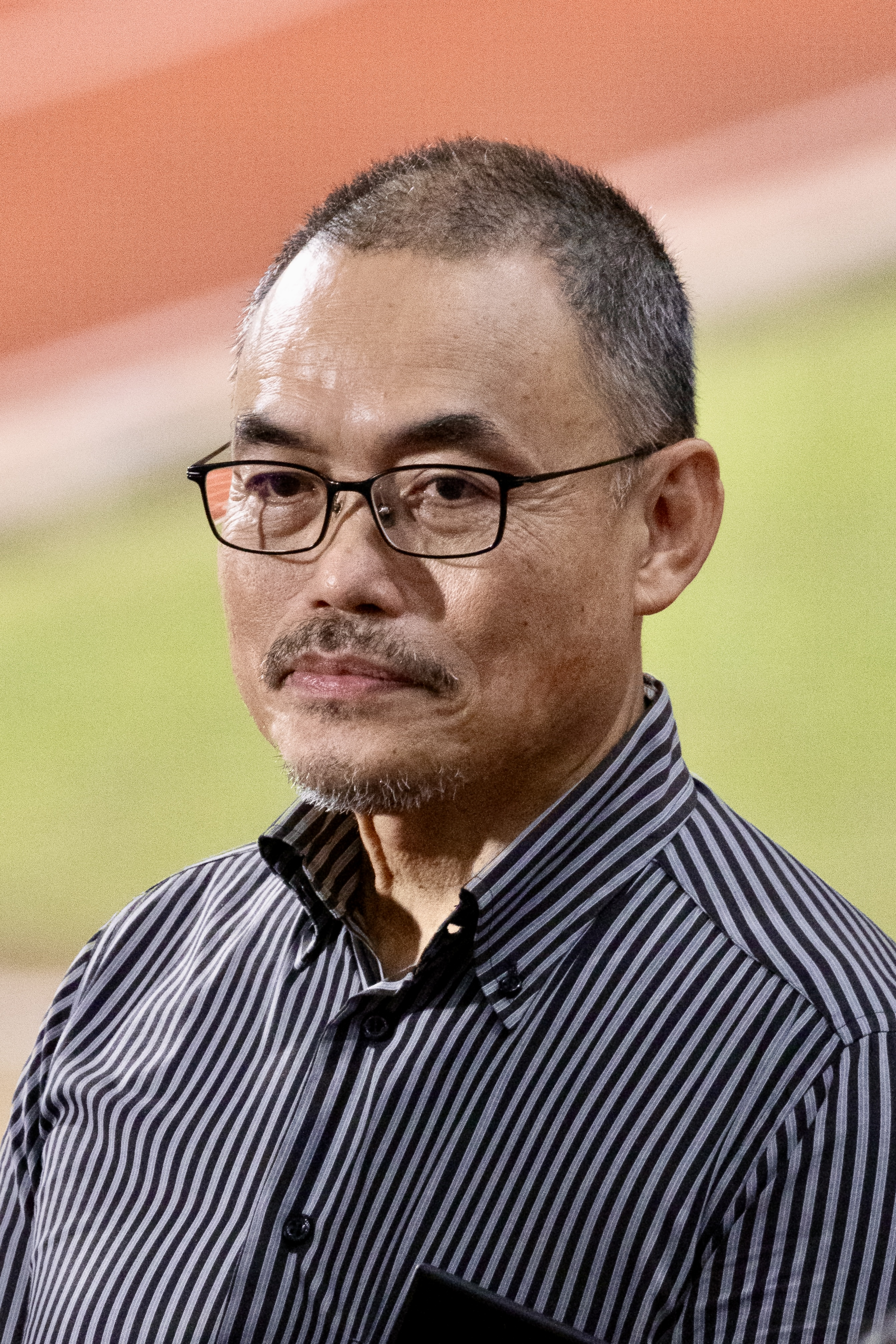
Khairuddin Abdul Hamid, Deputy Minister of Finance and Economy

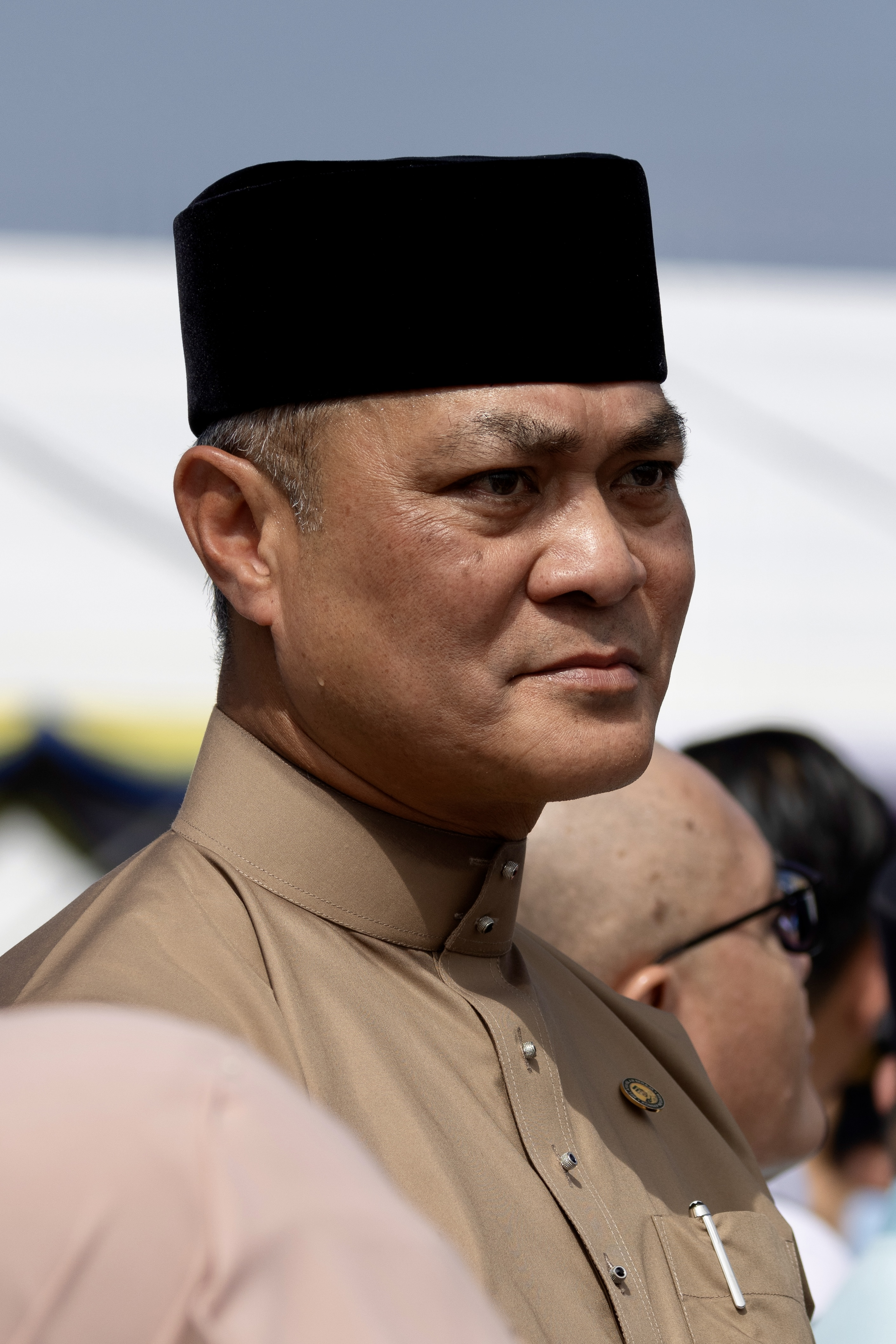
Ahmaddin Abdul Rahman, Minister of Home Affairs

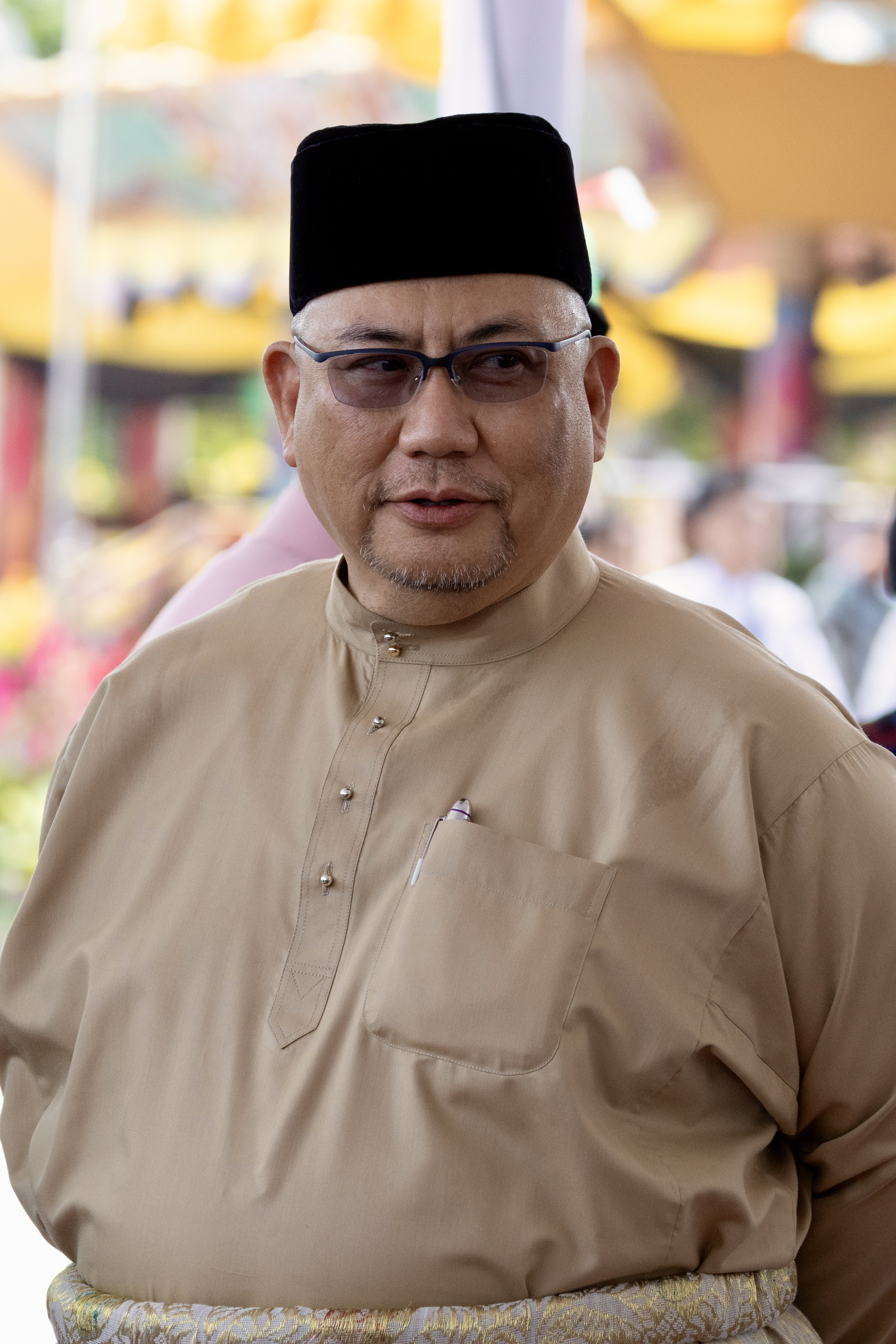
Riza Yunos, Deputy Minister at the Prime Minister's Office

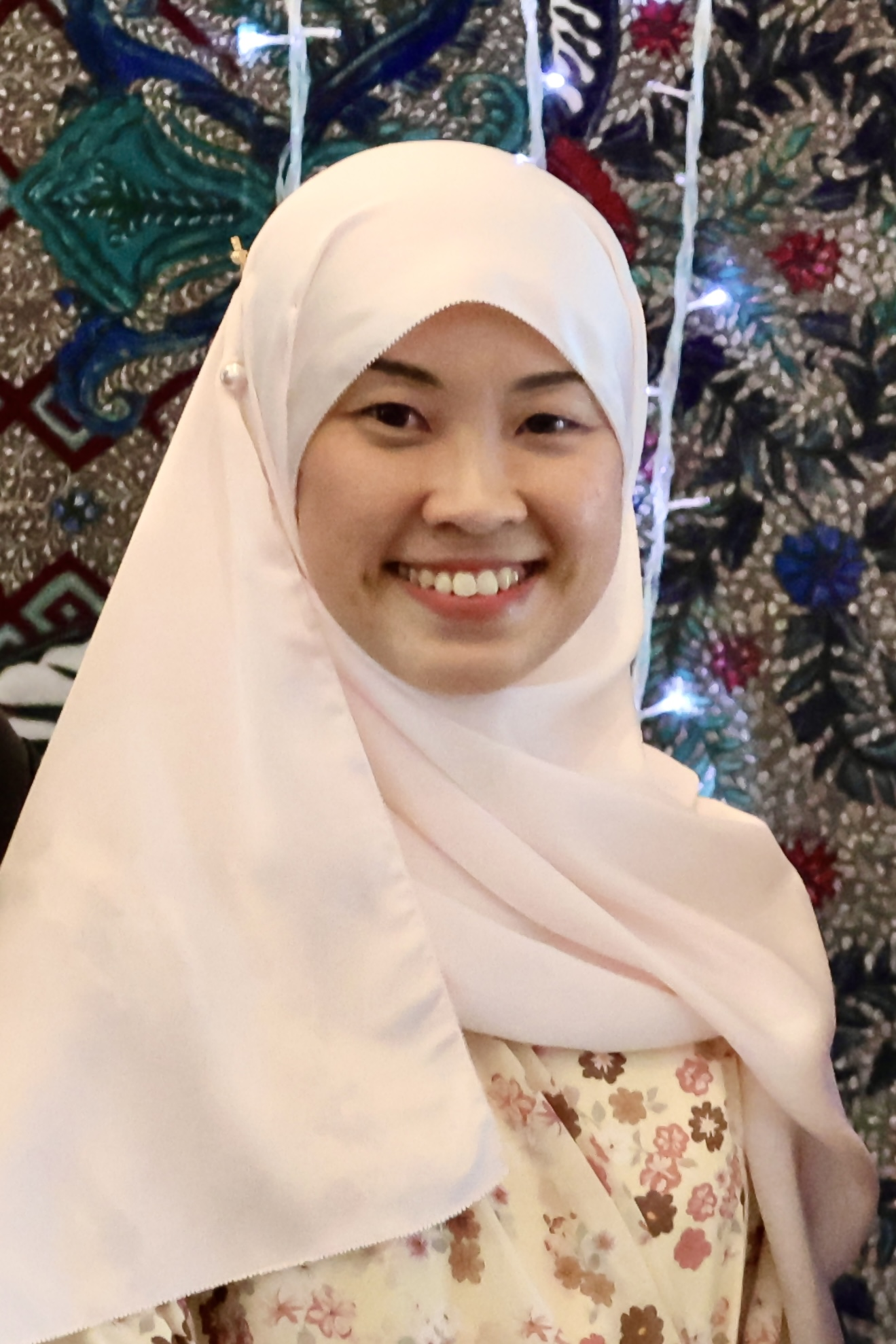
Queenie Chong, member of Legislative Council of Brunei

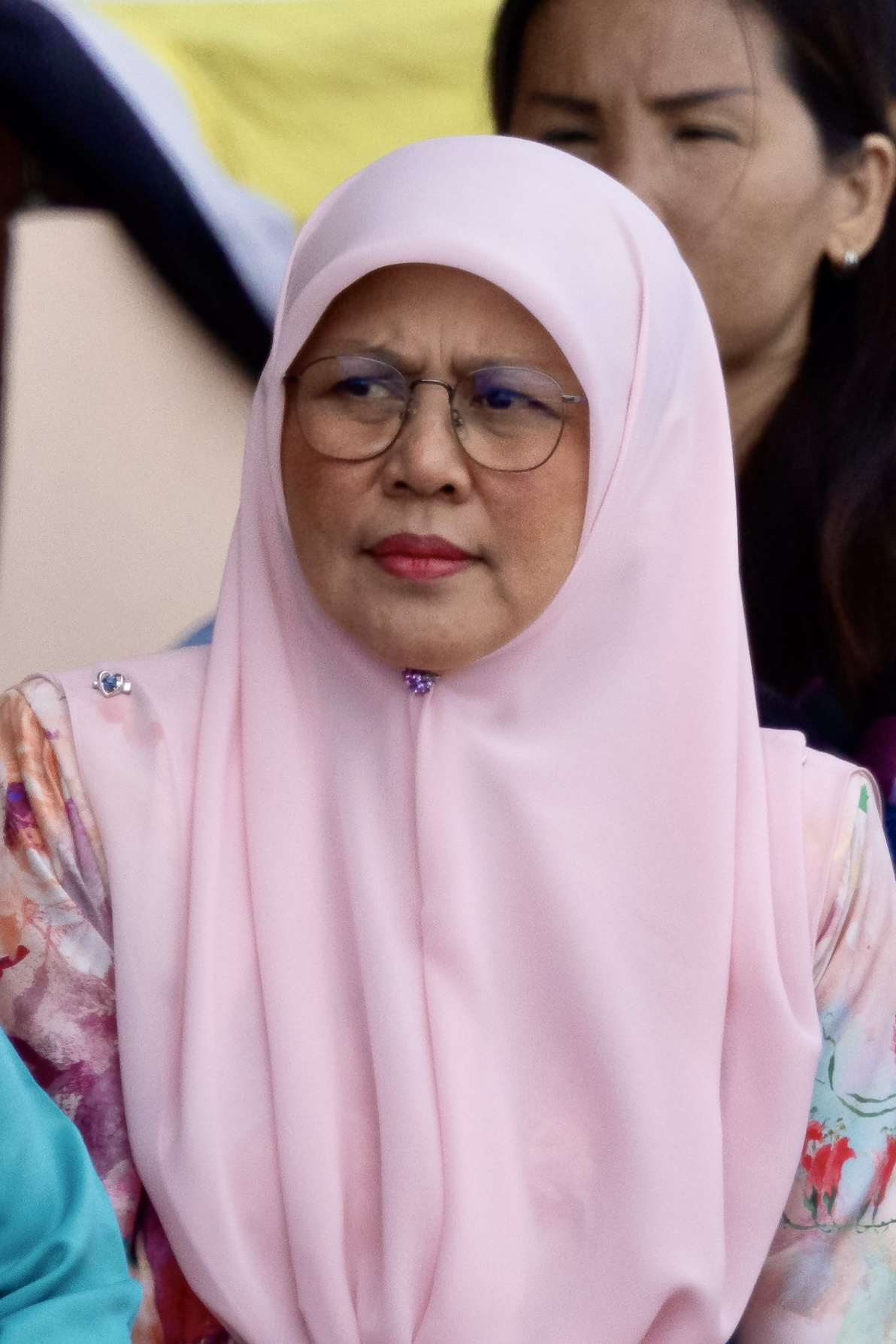
Romaizah Mohd Salleh, Minister of Education

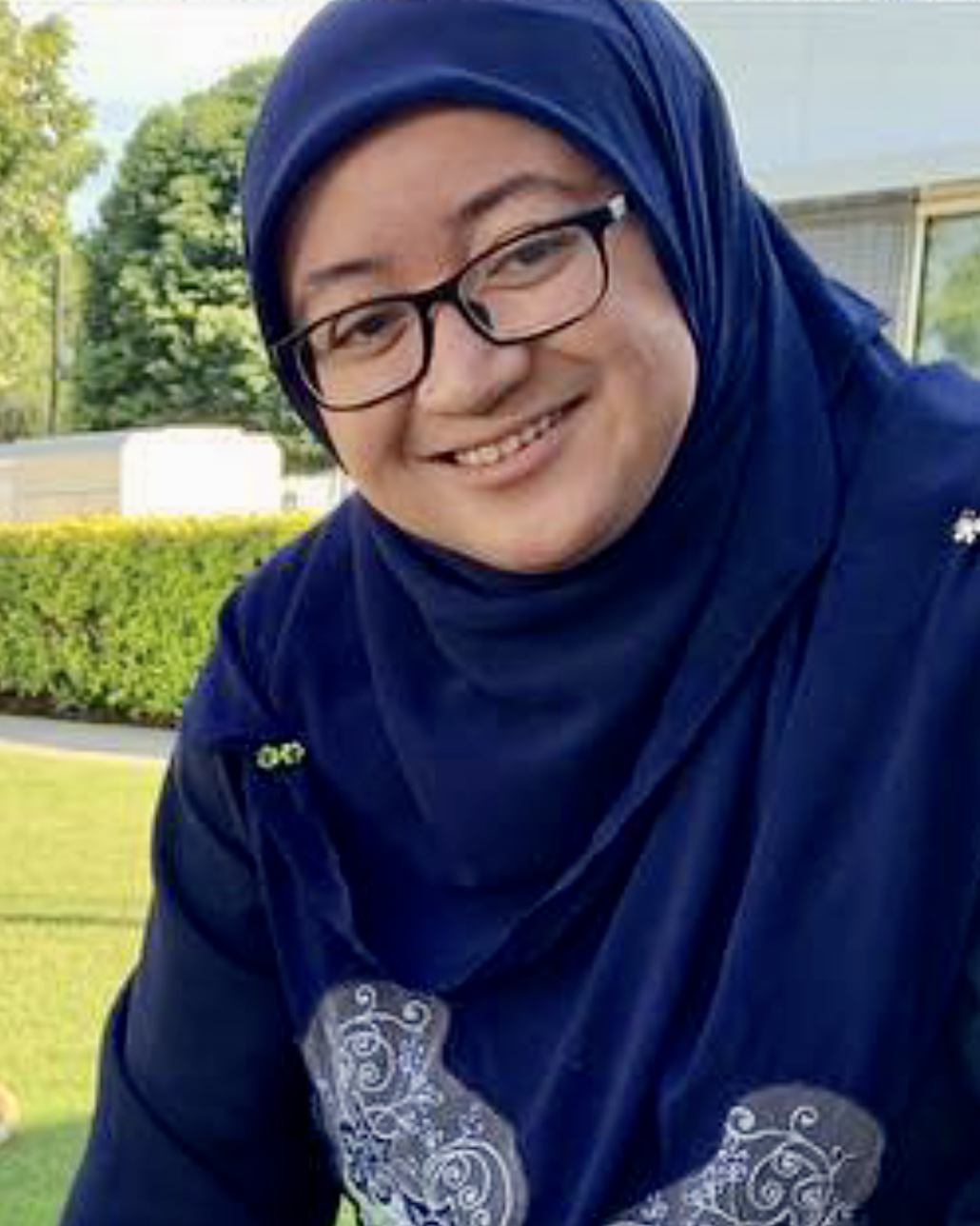
Khairunnisa Ash'ari, member of Legislative Council of Brunei

== Controversies ==
=== Censorship ===
Maung Zarni, co-founder of the Free Burma Coalition, was employed as an assistant professor of Asian studies at UBD. However, in January 2013, he had to quit due to restrictions on his public comments against the Rohingya massacre in Myanmar. He attributed the situation to "extreme and unprofessional academic censorship" and stated it is "impossible to maintain his professionalism." He claims to have taken part in a London School of Economics (LSE) panel on human rights and the rule of law in June 2012. Aung San Suu Kyi attended the panel while travelling around Europe. He claims that as a kind of punishment, UBD withheld institutional and financial assistance from him 24 hours prior to his departure to London, forcing him to take personal leave and cover the US$3,000 airfare on his own. The Human Rights Resource Centre for ASEAN has reported that as a result of this incident, scholars at Bruneian universities are expressly obliged to engage in self-censorship when discussing topics related to Islam and the monarchy.

== See also ==
- List of Islamic educational institutions
