= UBD IBM Centre =

Coordinates: 4.9737236°N 114.8977715°E

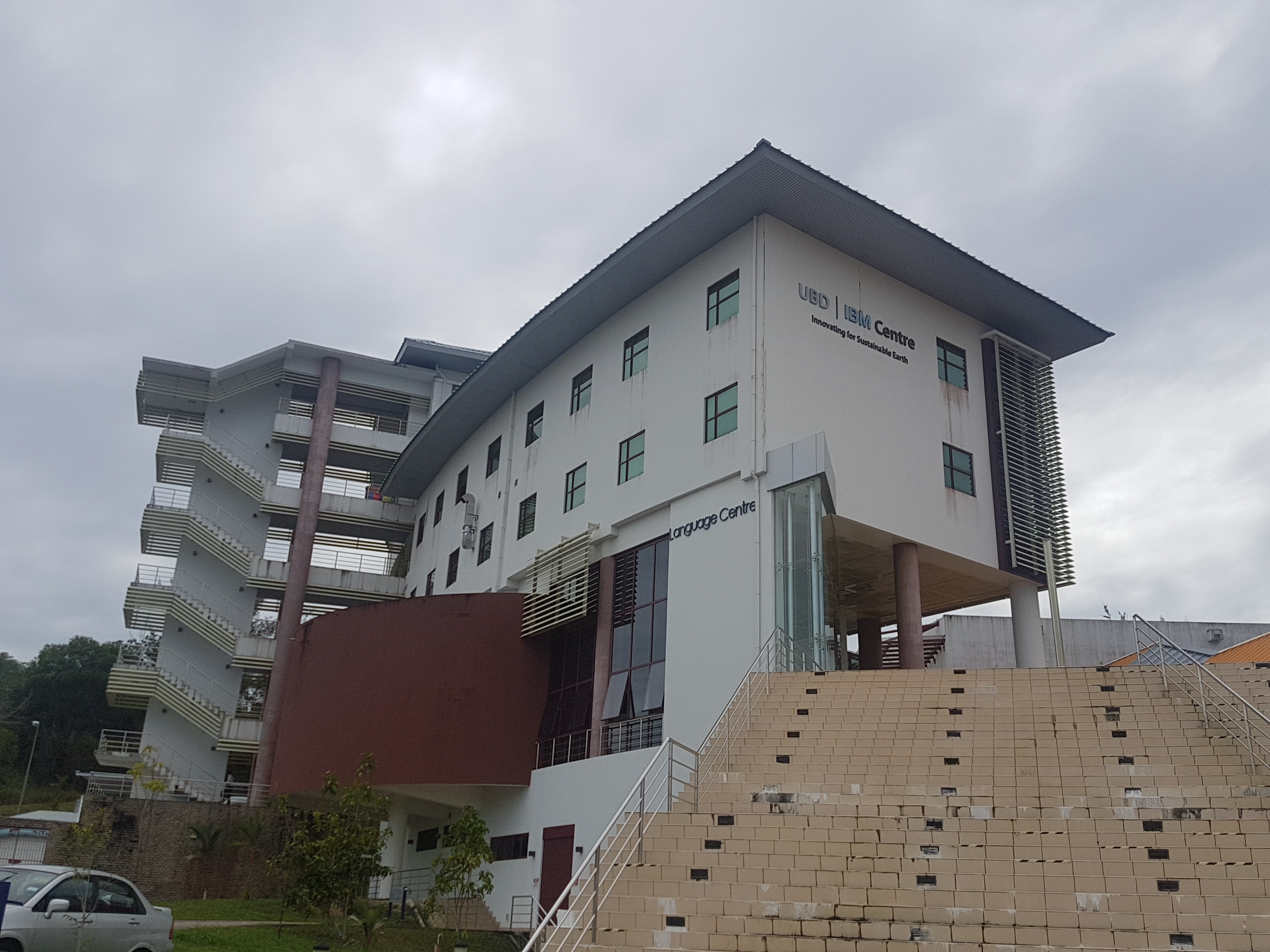
UBD IBM Centre in 2019

The UBD|IBM Centre is research collaboration between the Universiti Brunei Darussalam and International Business Machines (IBM) Corporation. The centre was launched by His Majesty Sultan Haji Hassanal Bolkiah Mu'izzadin Waddaulah, the Sultan and Yang Di-Pertuan of Brunei Darussalam, on October 15, 2011. IBM Research Labs in India, New York, USA (Watson), Australia, and Brazil are participating in this joint research.

== Research Facilities ==
One of the major research facilities at the centre is the IBM Blue Gene/P Supercomputer. Blue Gene/P has a massively parallel architecture consisting of 1024 independent units of microprocessors that are connected together to form a very high computational capacity. The computational power of Blue Gene/P is being utilized for high resolution weather forecasting which can predict the weather 48 hours ahead at a high resolution of 1.5 km x 1.5 km. These weather forecasts are further used for various applications like analyzing the effects of climate change, flood forecasting, solar and wind power forecasts and agro-technologies like mobile applications for rice farmers.

== Research Projects ==
Currently, The Centre focuses its research on Regional Climate and Weather Modelling, Energy Efficiency, Renewable Energy, Agro-technology and Hydrology using high performance computing facilities which are installed at UBD, thus moving forward with its mission "Innovating for Sustainable Earth".

Energy is one of the major research focuses of the UBD|IBM Centre. A number of research projects in this area are being undertaken by the Centre during past 2 years. An example is the project on developing a system to model and forecast the performance of solar photovoltaic modules under varying weather conditions. Such studies, apart from giving insights to the design requirements of grid integrated and roof top solar PV systems, would also help in strategising optimal integration and dispatch of solar electricity to the electricity grids.

Another project under energy aims at improving the stability and reliability of the power distribution systems. This addresses the ‘power swing’ phenomena, which is basically the fluctuations and oscillations in the electrical parameters resulting in disturbances in the power systems. An innovative techniques for early detection of power swing in the network is being developed, which helps in taking preventive measures for the protection of electrical components such as generators and transformers.

Under the energy efficiency research, the power consumption pattern in residential buildings is being analyzed by a three level power monitoring system. The system monitors the energy usage at regional, house and appliance levels using advances sensor technologies and analytics. By these technologies, the homes can be made grid 'friendly' by balancing the load and improving the efficiency of energy consumption. Possibilities of using renewable energy from photo-voltaic sources are also investigated in this project. The study can further be extended to energy benchmarking in residential buildings in Brunei. Benchmarking provides the baseline measure for EEC, and it provides supporting data for building energy management.

The Centre is also involved in community level energy projects at Sukang, Belait district. Apart from providing clean energy to this remote community, the project also aims to demonstrate how the use of clean technologies can lower the carbon foot print by adopting renewable resources as well as improving the efficiency in energy usage. Specially designed algorithms are being used to control the power generation, schedule and distribute the load, and to optimise power consumption. The system will have a highly interactive and user friendly control interface which can be easily managed with minimal technical training.

Another area of focus of the centre is food security. Under this component, computer models to support the Agricultural Systems are developed. A decision support system for the efficient management of paddy cultivation is being developed under this research. With the support of the high resolution weather prediction models developed under the centre, the optimal schedule for various agricultural activities can be estimated which helps in maximizing the productivity.

FloodSim, the flood forecasting model developed by the centre, helps in forecasting possible floods that may affect various locations in the country. The proposed system models the rainfall and runoff to predict the water flow in rivers in different time scales. This project has high potential in preventing the disasters caused by floods and hence can support the disaster management initiatives.

== Human resource development ==
The centre is actively engaged in capacity building through specially designed courses and training programmes. For example, the sustainability summer school organized by the centre has attracted participants from 10 countries around the world. The recently conducted modular training programmes on high performance computing, weather and climate modelling and renewable energy have received overwhelming responses from the participants. Several other professional training programmes are also being conducted by the centre.

== Achievements ==
Within this short span of time, several International patents could be filed from the research conducted at the centre. Some of them are

- Wind Farm Layout in Consideration of Three- Dimensional wake.
- Plug Arrangements for Alleviating Peak Loads.
- Enforcing Fine-Grained Demand Management in Smart Grids.
- Automating Weather Model Configurations.
- Grid-Friendly Data Center.
- Reducing Conversion Losses and Minimizing Load via Appliance Level Distributed Storage.
- Improving Power Factor.
- Managing Electricity Usage for an Appliance.

Apart from these, eight technical artifacts were also developed at the centre. The findings of the research at the centre are shared with the International academic community through publications in high impact journals and conferences.

== See also ==
Universiti Brunei Darussalam
