= Valups =

Valups Corporation is a company based in Seoul, Korea which makes products for watching mobile television.

== About the company ==
Valups was spun off from iCube Corporation in 2008, and as such has the right to use that company's intellectual property in developing IPTV products, including home convergence. Valups has continued a relationship with icube. Its major area of business is the Internet Protocol television set-top box, which allows Video on demand (VOD) to be added to traditional cable or satellite. Using Digital Living Network Alliance (DLNA) technology, files can be shared between various devices, including TV, set-top box, DVD/Blu-ray Disc and PVR.

== Tivit ==
The Valups T1000 is a device capable of receiving mobile television signals through DVB-T, using Wi-Fi to transmit to iPhones. Another method is to use a USB cable and watch TV on a personal computer. The advanced version, called the Tivit, received the Best of CES award at the January 2010 Consumer Electronics Show. The Tivit works with the iPhone 3G and 3GS, third-generation iPod Touch and BlackBerry. It may be battery-operated for three hours on a charge or left plugged in. Before becoming available in the United States, the Tivit was introduced in Japan, and an iPhone app was developed. Axel Technologies software made the device compatible with the European DVB-H standard.

== iCube Corporation ==
iCube Corporation, based in Seoul, Korea, started in 1995 and manufactures digital media adapters and other entertainment products. The company's products have applications based on combining digital TV with broadband and P2P.

Play@TV, which allows people to watch files stored on a computer on their TVs wirelessly. won the Intel IPCP DMA award for 2003. SlideMill creates videos and screensavers from photo files. PhotoMill allows editing and processing of photos. iRec is an iPod video recorder.

LetzDV won a multimedia award in 2001.

Japan operations began in 2002, and iCube America Co. Ltd. was established in 2004.
