= International Consortium of Universities for the Study of Biodiversity and the Environment =

The International Consortium of Universities for the Study of Biodiversity and the Environment or iCUBE aims to connect a group of public research universities to form a consortium to address the problems and issues related to biodiversity and the environment, for both research and educational purposes.

== Members ==
iCUBE is composed of a key group of public research universities sharing a common mission whilst committed to education and research on the environment, biodiversity and climate change, namely:

- King's College London
- Korea University
- Monash University
- National University of Singapore
- Universiti Brunei Darussalam
- University of Auckland
- University of Bonn
- University of North Carolina at Chapel Hill

== Objective ==
iCUBE aims to promote awareness and understanding, disseminate knowledge as well conduct collaborative research on problems and issues relevant to the environment and biodiversity. The group is designed to strengthen the existing international linkages and further it by promoting educational and intellectual exchanges as well as collaboration among scholars and students.

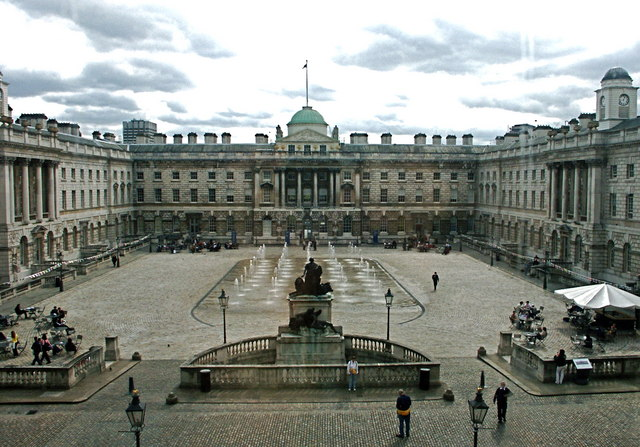
King's College London

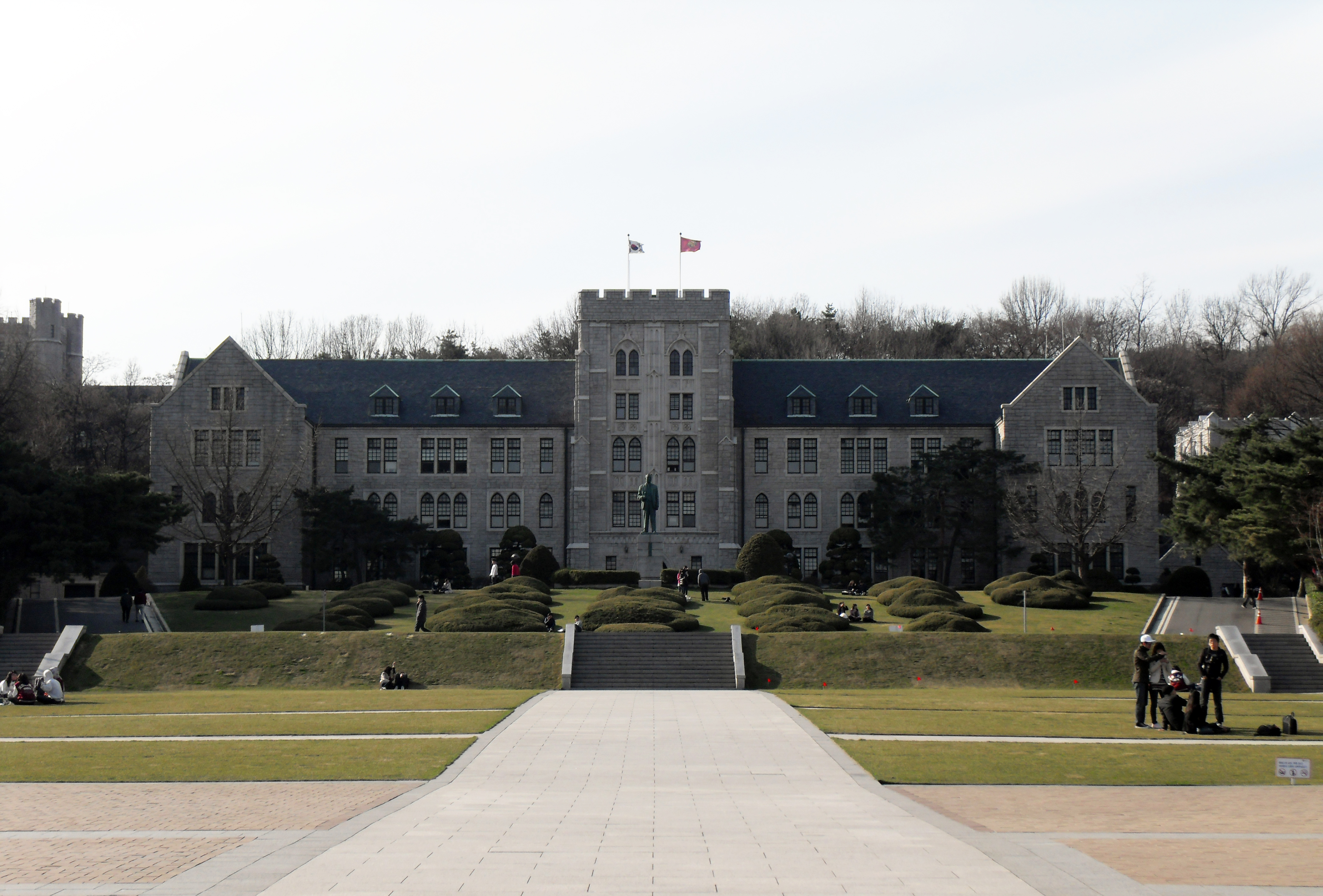
Korea University

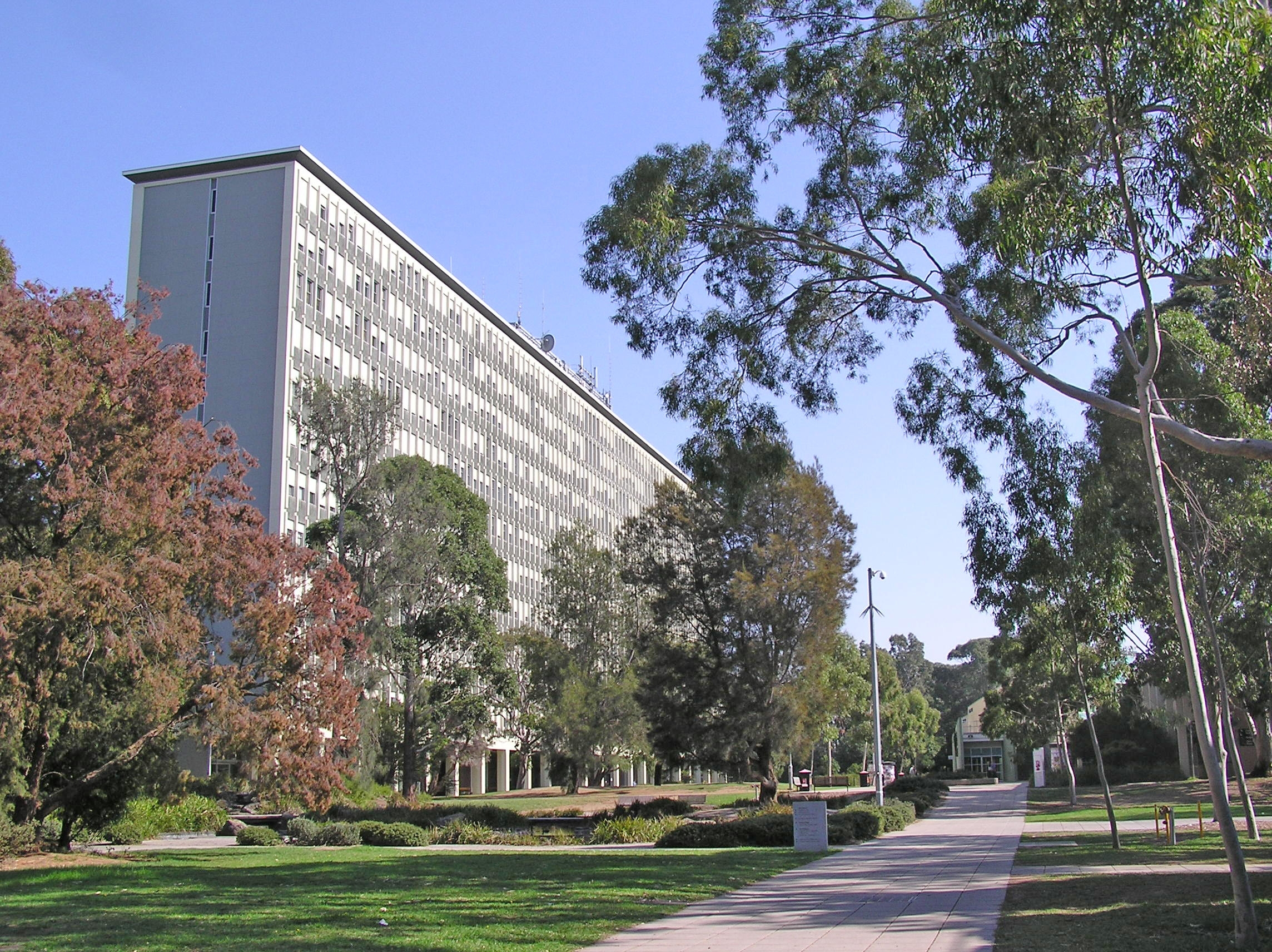
Monash University

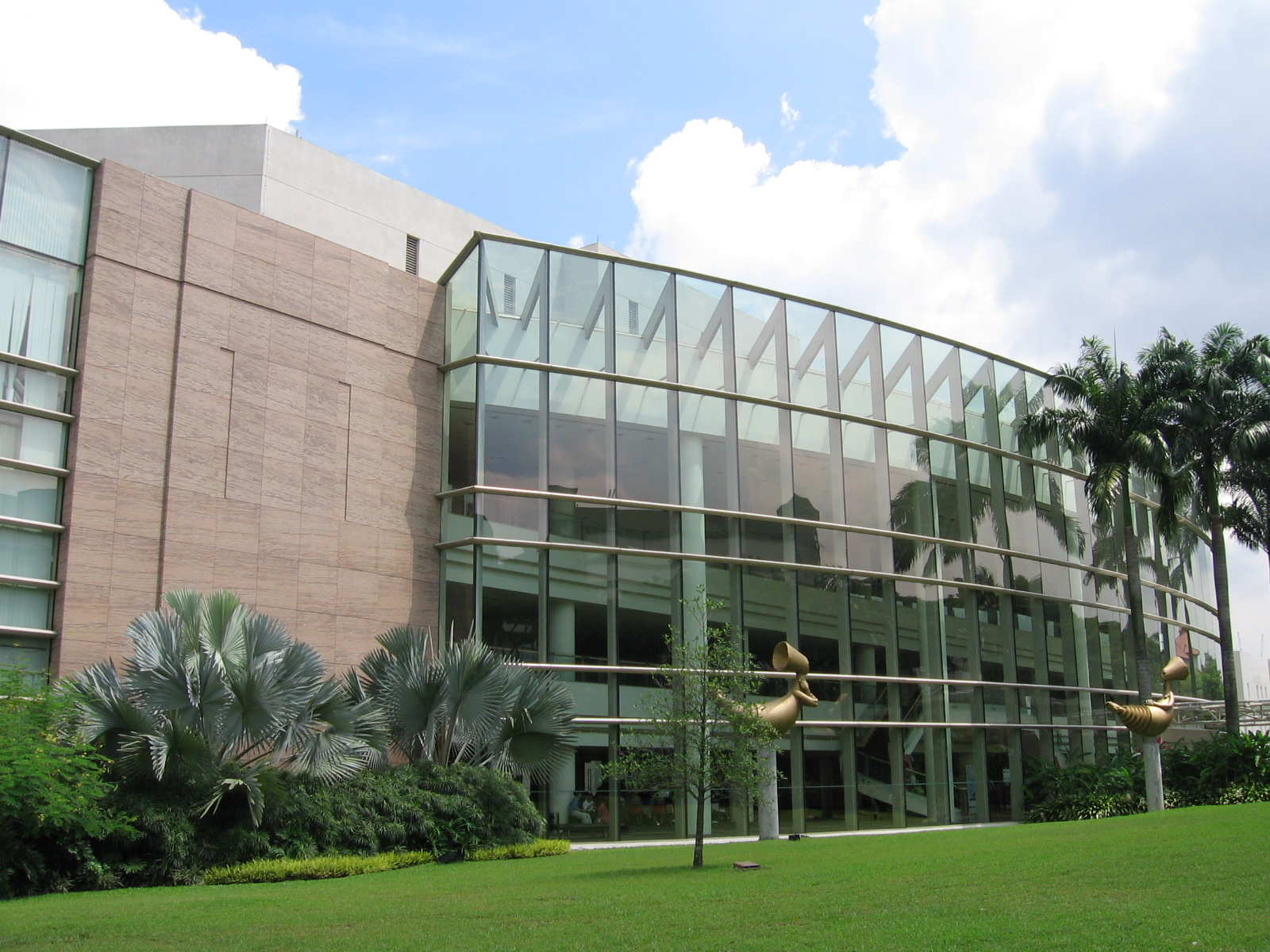
National University of Singapore

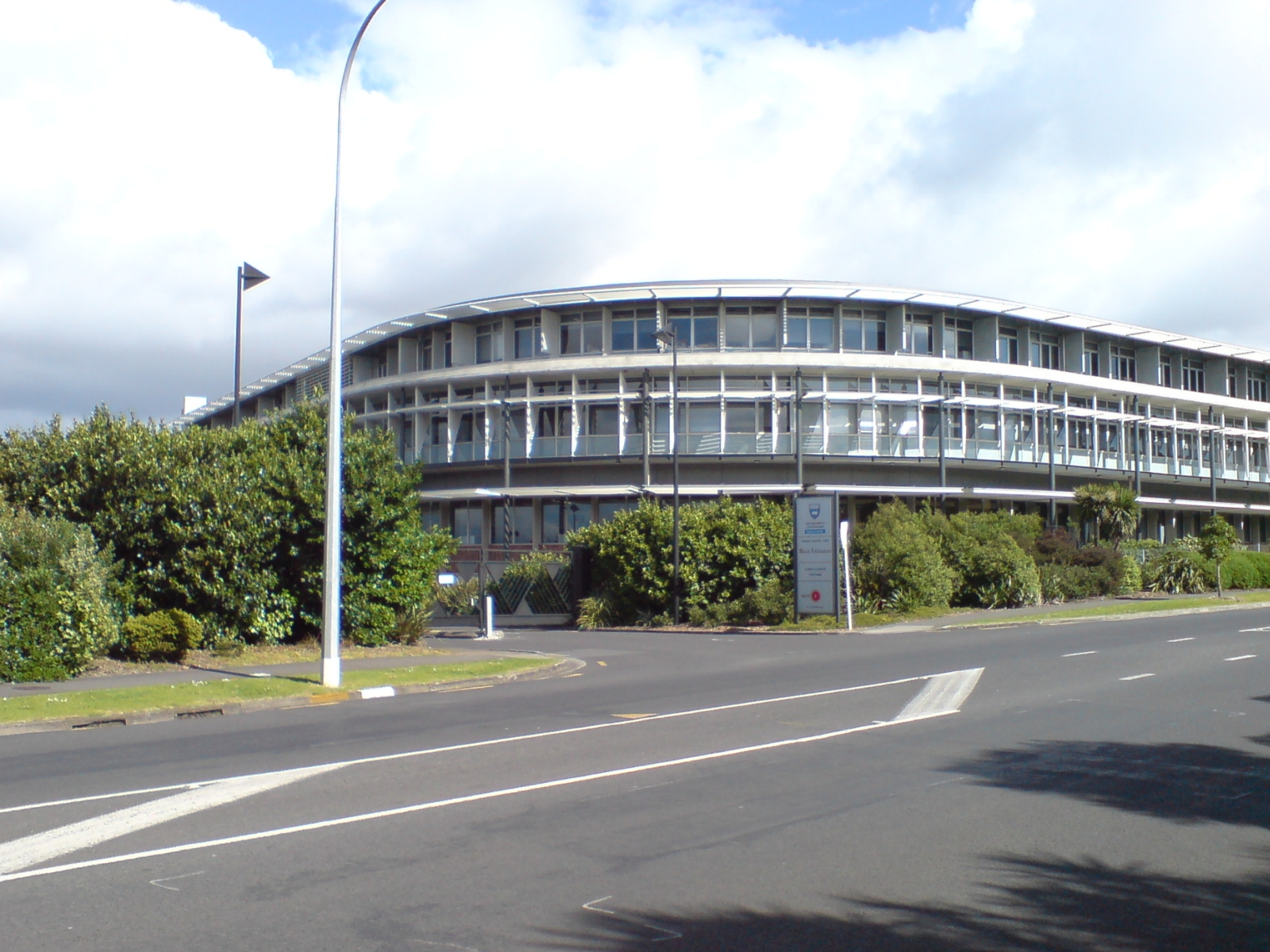
University of Auckland

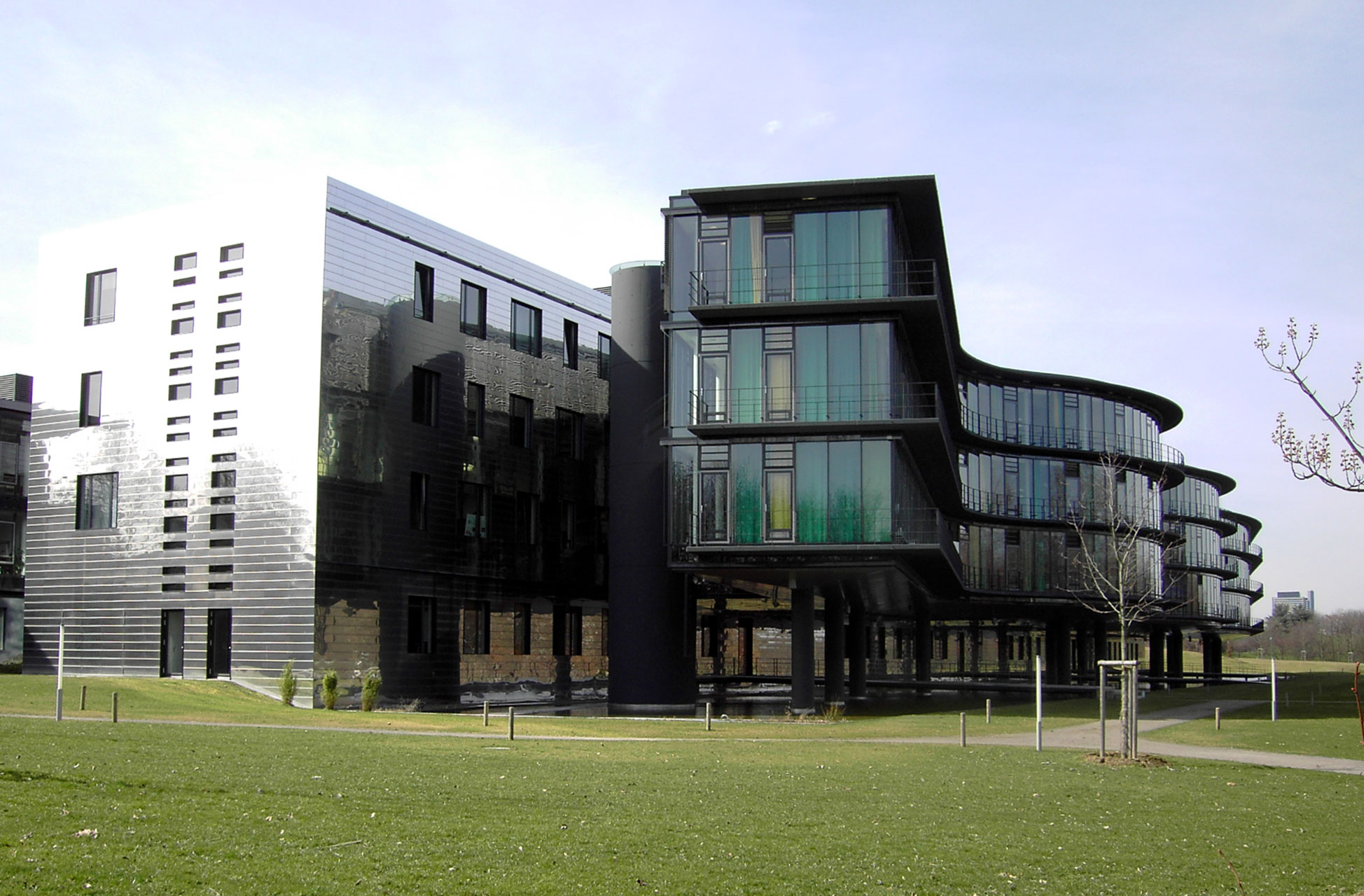
University of Bonn

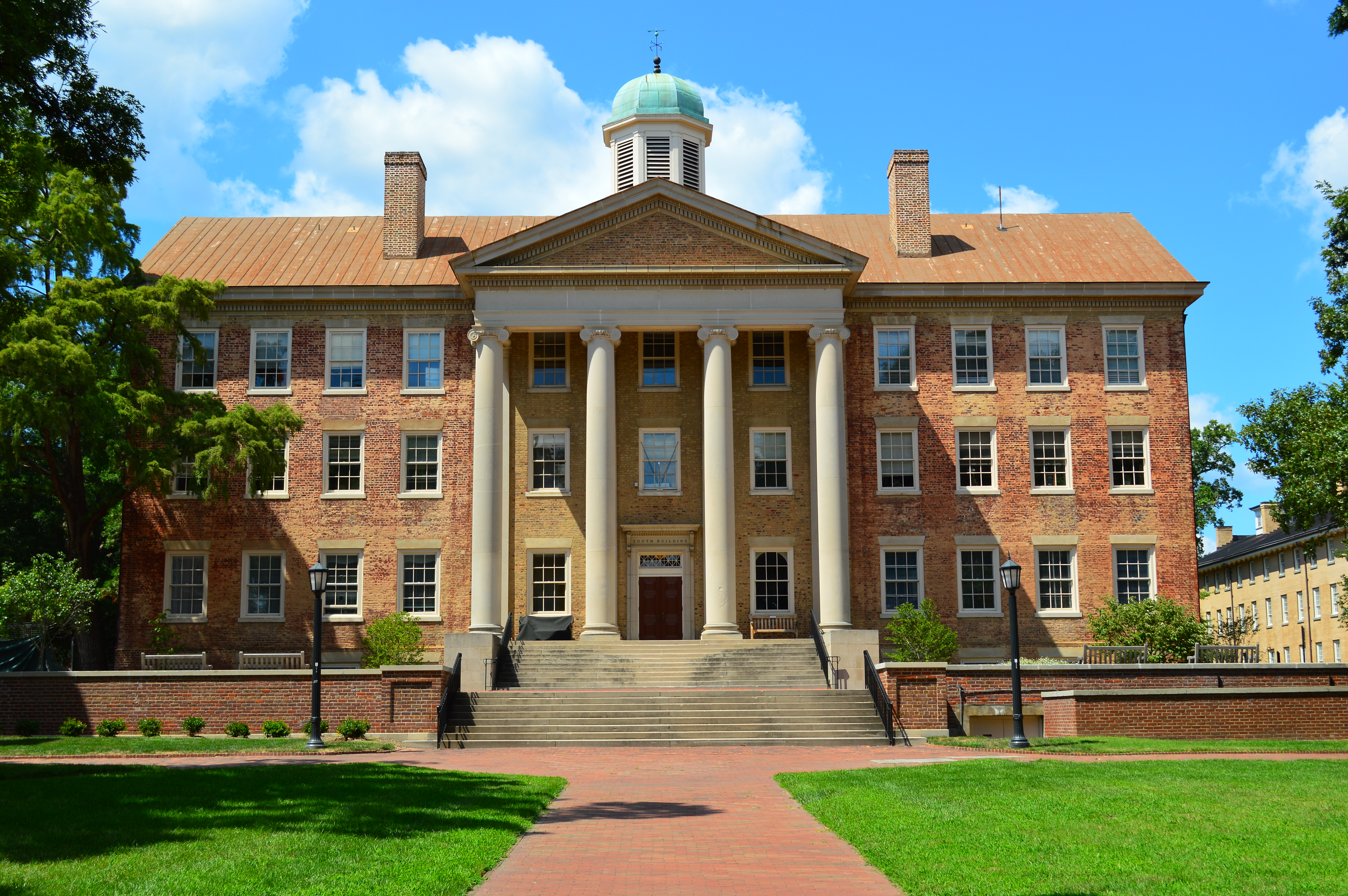
University of North Carolina at Chapel Hill
