= Ministry of Home Affairs (Brunei) =

Government ministry of Brunei

Coordinates: 4°53′28″N 114°56′30″E

- Kementerian Hal Ehwal Dalam Negeri
- National emblem of Brunei

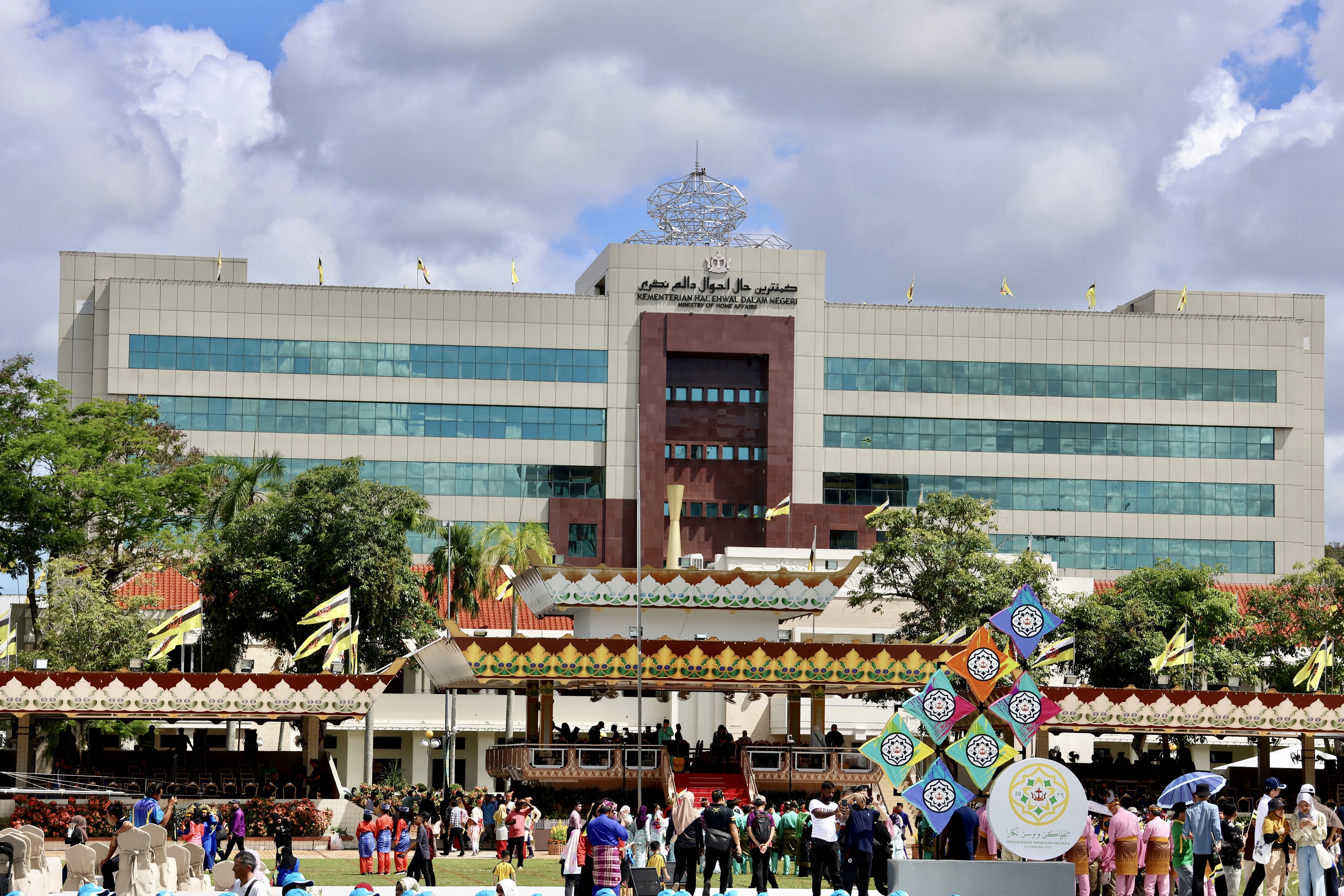
- Minister of Home Affairs' headquarters

Ministry overview
- Formed: 1 January 1984; 41 years ago
- Jurisdiction: Government of Brunei
- Headquarters: Kementerian Hal Ehwal Dalam Negeri, Jalan James Pearce, Bandar Seri Begawan, Brunei BS8610
- Employees: 4,468 (2024)
- Annual budget: ▼$128 million BND (2022)
- Minister responsible: Ahmaddin Abdul Rahman (Note: The official Malay name upon the appointment was Dato Seri Paduka Awang Haji Ahmaddin bin Haji Abd. Rahman.), Minister
- Website: www.khedn.gov.bn

The Ministry of Home Affairs (MoHA; Malay: Kementerian Hal Ehwal Dalam Negeri, KHEDN) is a cabinet-level ministry in the government of Brunei which is responsible for the country's administrative divisions, municipal areas, immigration, labour, fire and rescue services, prison and rehabilitation institutions, and national disaster management. It was established immediately upon Brunei's independence on 1 January 1984. It is currently led by a minister and the incumbent is Ahmaddin Rahman, who took office since 7 June 2022. The ministry is headquartered in Bandar Seri Begawan.

== Organisation ==
The ministry oversees the following departments:

Department	Name in Malay
Brunei-Muara District Office	Jabatan Daerah Brunei dan Muara
Belait District Office	Jabatan Daerah Belait
Tutong District Office	Jabatan Daerah Tutong
Temburong District Office	Jabatan Daerah Temburong
Bandar Seri Begawan Municipal Department	Jabatan Bandaran Bandar Seri Begawan
Kuala Belait and Seria Municipal Department	Jabatan Bandaran Kuala Belait dan Seria
Tutong Municipal Department	Jabatan Bandaran Tutong
Immigration and National Registration Department	Jabatan Imigresen dan Pendaftaran Kebangsaan
Labour Department	Jabatan Buruh
Fire and Rescue Department	Jabatan Bomba dan Penyelamat
Prison Department	Jabatan Penjara
National Disaster Management Centre	Pusat Pengurusan Bencana Kebangsaan

== Budget ==
In the 2022–23 fiscal year, the ministry has been allocated a budget of B$128 million, (Note: ≈US$92 million as of July 2022) a 1.5 percent decrease from the previous year.

== List of ministers ==
The ministry is headed by a minister (menteri) and is a member of the Council of Cabinet Ministers, the cabinet of Brunei. The minister is assisted by a permanent secretary and the latter with two deputy permanent secretaries. The first Minister of Home Affairs was Hassanal Bolkiah, the Sultan of Brunei. In the cabinet reshuffle in 1986, the post was given to Isa Ibrahim, who became the first ordinary citizen to have taken the office.

=== Minister ===
No.	Portrait	Minister	Term start	Term end	Time in office	Ref.
1		Hassanal Bolkiah	1 January 1984	20 October 1986	2 years, 292 days	
2		Isa Ibrahim	20 October 1986	24 May 2005	18 years, 216 days	
3		Adanan Yusof	24 May 2005	29 May 2010	5 years, 5 days	
4		Badaruddin Othman	29 May 2010	22 October 2015	5 years, 146 days	
5		Abu Bakar Apong	22 October 2015	7 June 2022	6 years, 228 days	
6		Ahmaddin Abdul Rahman	7 June 2022	incumbent	3 years, 187 days	

=== Deputy minister ===
No.	Portrait	Minister	Term start	Term end	Time in office	Ref.
1		Abidin Abdul Rashid	20 October 1986	9 August 2002	15 years, 293 days	
2		Adanan Yusof	9 August 2002	24 May 2005	2 years, 288 days	
3		Dani Ibrahim	24 May 2005	29 May 2010	5 years, 5 days	
4		Halbi Mohammad Yussof	29 May 2010	21 October 2015	5 years, 145 days	

== See also ==
- List of government ministries of Brunei
- Ministry of Foreign Affairs and Trade (Brunei)
