= Adanan Yusof =

Bruneian civil servant and politician (born 1952)

Yang Berhormat Pehin Orang Kaya Johan Pahlawan Dato Seri Setia Adanan Yusof PSNB DPMB PHBS PJK PIKB PKL
- ادنان يوسف
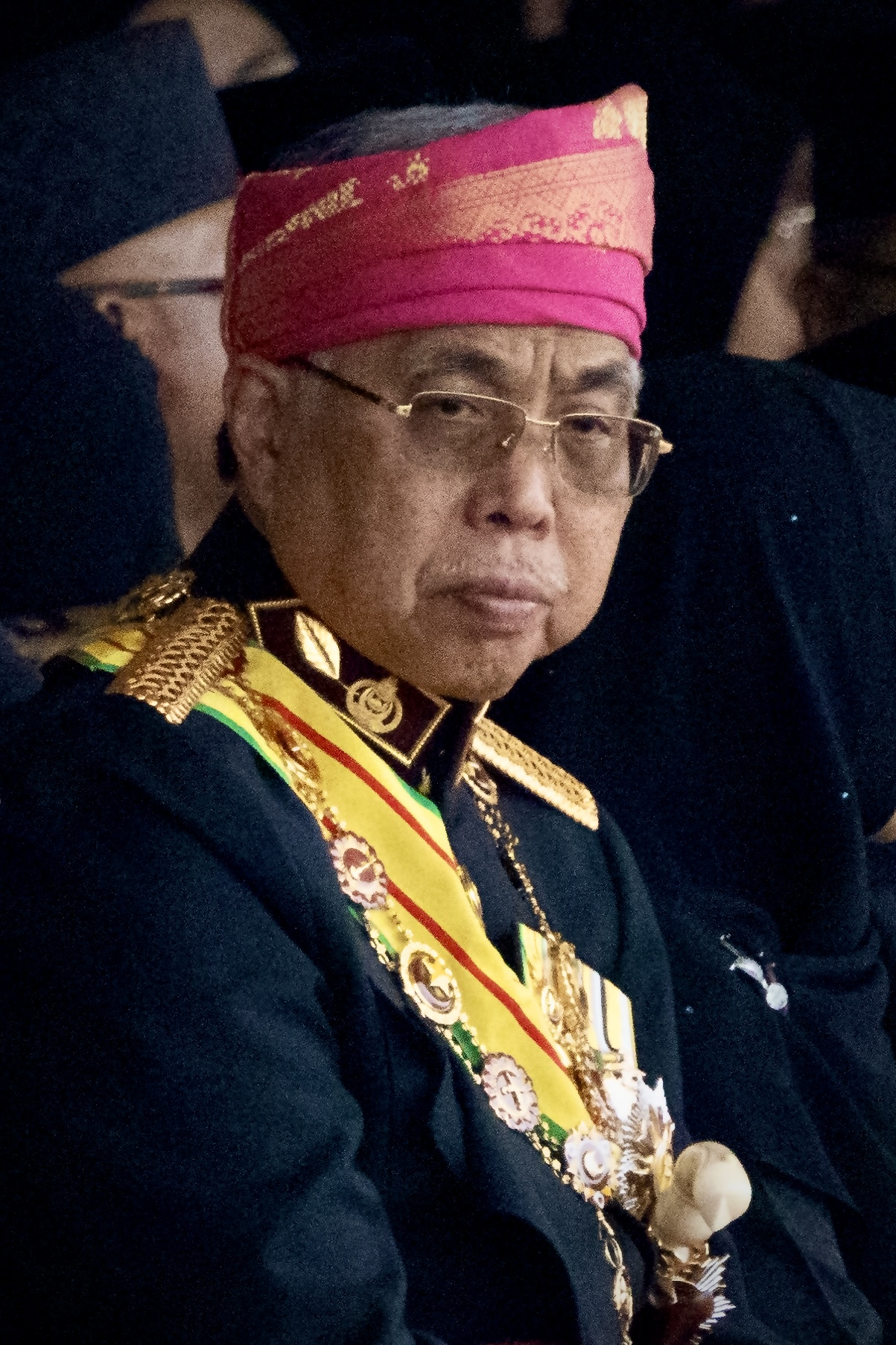
- Adanan in 2024

Member of Legislative Council
- Incumbent
- Assumed office 20 January 2023

4th Minister of Health
- In office 29 May 2010 – 21 October 2015
- Monarch: Hassanal Bolkiah
- Preceded by: Suyoi Osman
- Succeeded by: Zulkarnain Hanafi

3rd Minister of Home Affairs
- In office 24 May 2005 – 28 May 2010
- Deputy: Dani Ibrahim
- Preceded by: Isa Ibrahim
- Succeeded by: Badaruddin Othman

2nd Deputy Minister of Home Affairs
- In office 9 August 2002 – 24 May 2005
- Minister: Isa Ibrahim
- Preceded by: Abidin Abdul Rashid
- Succeeded by: Dani Ibrahim

Personal details
- Born: 7 December 1952 (age 73) Kampong Tamoi, Kampong Ayer, Brunei
- Spouse: Salmah Hanafiah
- Education: University of East Anglia (BA)
- Occupation: Civil servant; politician

Adanan bin Haji Mohd Yusof (Note: The alternate spelling of his given name is "Adnan" rather than "Adanan," while his patronymic is written as "Yusuf" instead of "Yusof.") (born 7 December 1952) is a Bruneian aristocrat, civil servant and politician who serve as a member of the Legislative Council of Brunei (LegCo) since 2023. He has formerly held office as the deputy minister of home affairs from 2002 to 2005, minister of home affairs from 2005 to 2010, and as minister of health from 2010 to 2015.

== Early life and education ==
Adanan was born on 7 December 1952 in Kampong Tamoi, a village within Kampong Ayer, the son of Begawan Pehin Siraja Khatib Dato Seri Setia Haji Mohd Yusof bin Pehin Orang Kaya Perdana Wangsa Haji Mohammad. He has two known brothers: Dato Paduka Alikhan, the private and confidential secretary to Crown Prince Al-Muhtadee Billah, and Haji Rani, the acting commissioner of labour in the Ministry of Home Affairs (MoHA). Adanan pursued his higher education at the University of East Anglia, where he earned a Bachelor of Arts.

== Ministerial career ==
=== Early career ===
Adanan began his career with the Brunei government as a project officer at the Economic Development Board from 1978 to 1981. He then served as an administrative officer, grade I, in the Public Service Department from 1981 to 1982 and in the Anti-Corruption Bureau from 1982 to 1984. Subsequently, he held the position of special grade administrative officer in MoHA from 1984 to 1986, followed by senior administrative officer at MoHA from 1987 to 1992. From 1993 to 1997, he served as director of immigration and national registration.

Adanan was promoted to permanent secretary of MoHA while concurrently serving as director of immigration and national registration from 1 October 1997 to 12 July 1999, before being appointed permanent secretary at the Prime Minister's Office (PMO) on 13 July 1999. On 22 May 2002, he reaffirmed Brunei's commitment to global and regional counterterrorism efforts, emphasising the importance of intelligence sharing and collaboration with international law enforcement. He made these remarks following the ASEAN Special Meeting on Terrorism, which firmly rejected associating terrorism with any race, religion, or culture. His tenure as permanent secretary concluded on 8 August 2002.

=== Deputy Minister of Home Affairs ===
Adanan's ministerial career commenced on 9 August 2002, when he was appointed deputy minister of home affairs with the consent of Sultan Hassanal Bolkiah. On 10 October, he urged mukim and village officials to tackle issues such as illegal immigration and drug abuse. He highlighted their role in fostering community development, addressing local concerns, and facilitating communication between citizens and the government.

In 2003, during Hari Raya, Adanan, as acting minister of home affairs, led a delegation to Belait District, where they visited the homes of Mukim Kuala Belait and Mukim Liang's acting penghulus to discuss local issues and strengthen relationships with community leaders. In April, during a visit to Mukim Amo, he emphasised the importance of community cooperation, encouraged residents to embrace patriotism and unity to overcome challenges, and urged the reporting of suspicious activities. He also discussed infrastructure improvements, including the clean water supply in Kampong Selapon. On 27 May, Adanan laid the cornerstone for a B$3.8 million fire station in Lambak Kanan to enhance emergency services and fire safety. He continued to serve as deputy minister of home affairs and was appointed interim director of internal security on 25 May, following a directive from the sultan, replacing Jemat Ampal, who remained permanent secretary at PMO.

On 11 October 2004, Adanan highlighted the importance of ASEAN collaboration in tackling cross-border crime and improving border control, emphasising the growing role of immigration officials in regional security during the 8th conference of ASEAN Consular Chiefs and Immigration Directors-General. On 22 November, during his visit to Temburong District, he stressed the significance of grassroots leaders working together to support the ministry's progress and the value of informal discussions with local leaders to address issues and strengthen relationships. Then, on 19 December, Adanan reiterated the need for public cooperation and vigilance in maintaining national security, urging the reporting of suspicious activities and unlawful behaviour, and emphasising that safeguarding peace and stability was a collective responsibility shared by all, not just law enforcement.

=== Minister of Home Affairs ===
On 24 May 2005, Adanan was appointed as and promoted to minister of home affairs under the sultan's order as part of a cabinet reshuffle. Later that month on 30th, all cabinet ministers including Adanan were summoned by Sultan Hassanal Bolkiah to take the oath at Istana Nurul Iman. Adanan was present at the groundbreaking ceremony for a five-story, $4 million government building in Tutong on 2 June. During the launch of the Juara Gemilang Seni Carnival on 23 July 2005, he emphasised the importance of youth involvement in ensuring the success of the sultan's 59th birthday celebrations. On 19 November, senior representatives from MoHA accompanied Adanan on a Hari Raya tour of Kuala Belait communities, where they discussed neighborhood issues, shared ideas, and visited the houses of local leaders.

On 20 January 2006, Adanan underscored the importance of Brunei's press, despite its smaller scale compared to other nations, urging the media to report truthfully and accurately while underlining its crucial role in educating the public and fostering national development through fairness and reliability. On 28 May, he called for more frequent cleanliness checks in public spaces and eateries, stressing the need to maintain cleanliness for public health and environmental protection, while encouraging collaboration between the public and local authorities to ensure the responsible use of public facilities. On 4 November, Adanan officially opened the 'Sri Selera Suria' Complex in Seria, stressing the importance of traders adhering to regulations, particularly timely rent payments, and warning that failure to comply could result in the revocation of business licenses.

Brunei became the 180th member state of the International Labour Organization (ILO) on 17 January 2007, after Adanan delivered a letter in Geneva on behalf of the government, formally accepting the ILO's constitutional obligations. On 15 February, Adanan oversaw the contract signing for the biometric passport system in Brunei, worth over $71 million, introducing a secure system with a chip and biometric data, including fingerprints and images. As part of the 8th National Development Plan (RKN), he presided over the groundbreaking ceremony for a $54.1 million market in Kuala Belait on 12 April, with completion expected by 20 October. During Brunei's inaugural Workers' Day celebration on 5 May, Adanan addressed global workplace safety issues, citing ILO reports on occupational illnesses and accidents that cause millions of deaths and injuries annually. On 6 November, the sultan met with ASEAN ministers at the 10th ASEAN Ministerial Meeting on Transnational Crime in Brunei, where Adanan chaired the meeting alongside key ASEAN officials.

Adanan served as the patron of the Temburong District Flood Victims Relief Fund in February 2008, and later as co-patron of the Brunei–Muara District Strong Wind Victims Relief Fund in May 2008, and co-adviser of the Flood and Landslide Victims Relief Fund Committee from January to February 2009. On 31 October, he visited the Belait District Office to review ongoing and completed infrastructure projects, underscoring the department's role in improving public welfare and rural development. He then visited the Kuala Belait and Seria Municipal Department on 8 December to assess projects enhancing local infrastructure and community welfare, including the Kuala Belait Phase I Conference Centre, the new market, and the Belait riverbank beautification. During this visit, he also inspected the new multipurpose hall and bowling alley under construction in Seria. On 24 December, Adanan addressed flexible border closing times at the Kuala Lurah checkpoint to ease vehicle queues and prevent stranding, emphasising the need for cooperation between Brunei's Immigration Department and Sarawak authorities, as well as public compliance and extended hours during peak times.

Brunei Darussalam has been blessed, and its experience in facing natural disasters has been limited to only flash floods, strong winds, forest fires, and haze. Some say we should not be complacent.

— Pehin Orang Kaya Johan Pahlawan Dato Seri Setia Haji Adanan, Pelita Brunei, 2010

On 18 January 2010, Adanan highlighted that government agencies had implemented measures following the 2009 monsoon season, such as building flood retention ponds, dredging rivers, and improving infrastructure. He also stressed the importance of collaboration and preparedness, noting the Ministry of Development's identification of additional projects to address flood-prone areas. On 8 February, Adanan discussed the rising impact of global warming, noting more frequent weather-related disasters in ASEAN, including heavier monsoon rains in Brunei, and highlighted the establishment of the National Disaster Management Centre in 2006, ongoing improvements in disaster response systems, and the collaboration between public, private sectors, NGOs, and communities.

=== Minister of Health ===
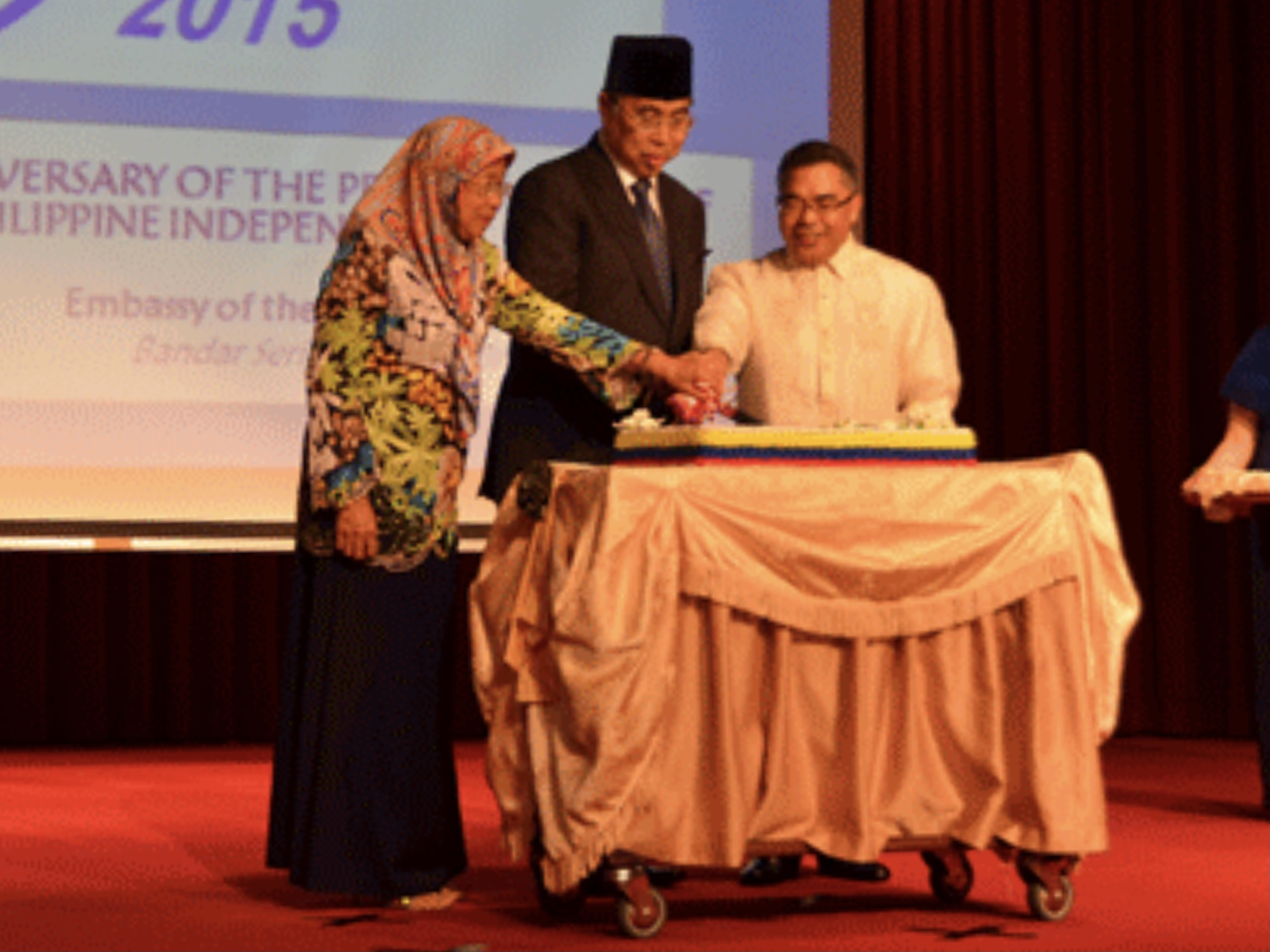
Adanan (middle) at the Philippines independence day celebration in 2015

As part of a cabinet reshuffle, Adanan was appointed minister of health on 29 May 2010, with his oath-taking ceremony following on 9 June of the same year.

The National Physical Activity Guidelines, which offer age-specific guidelines for daily activity, were introduced on 9 July 2011, Adanan said in response to a legislative inquiry about leisure and sports facilities. Adanan promoted using natural recreational areas and emphasised the importance of self-discipline in sustaining physical activity. In September 2011, at the APEC Dialogue in San Francisco, he highlighted Brunei's initiatives for comprehensive non-communicable disease (NCD) management and called for substantial investment in health innovation to address NCDs. He also engaged with US officials to explore training opportunities and health policies while advocating for cross-sector collaboration.

Later, at the 2011 Heart Health Forum, Adanan underscored the importance of preventive measures such as balanced diets, regular exercise, healthier lifestyles, and quitting smoking to enhance well-being and productivity. He stressed the need for early detection and timely treatment to address cardiovascular diseases, Brunei's leading cause of death, which has been on the rise since 2008. He expressed concern over the high prevalence of obesity, high cholesterol, hypertension, and elevated blood sugar levels among government employees.

On 31 January 2012, Adanan officiated the introduction of seven new ambulances, funded by the Ministry of Health's (MoH) special 2010–2012 budget at a cost of approximately $3 million, aimed at strengthening the Emergency Medical Ambulance Services and enhancing the ministry's emergency response capabilities. On 2 February, he inaugurated the Lamunin Health Centre in Tutong, a $2.7 million facility completed under the RKN 2007–2012. Later, on 22 February, he led the groundbreaking ceremony for the Rimba Health Centre in Gadong, a $7.8 million project under RKN 9, scheduled for completion in April 2013. From 24 to 28 September, Adanan represented Brunei at the 63rd session of the WHO Western Pacific Regional Committee Meeting in Vietnam.

On 10 April 2013, Adanan witnessed the signing of a Brunei–Germany MoU on healthcare cooperation, engaging with German health representatives to discuss its implementation, professional training, and global health challenges. At the 66th World Health Assembly, he led Brunei's delegation and held discussions with Mehmet Müezzinoğlu, Daniel Bahr, and WHO Director-General Margaret Chan on Brunei's achievements, the critical role of health in development, and the importance of international cooperation in healthcare. On 28 May, the Brunei–Singapore MoU on health cooperation was renewed at a signing ceremony at the Empire Hotel and Country Club, officiated by Minister for Health Gan Kim Yong and Adanan. On 24 November, Adanan addressed the 6th FDI/MoH Dental Convention, underscoring the importance of oral health in overall well-being, reaffirming the MoH's commitment to the 2008–2012 Oral Health Agenda, and urging the Department of Dental Services to assess its outcomes and strengthen programmes that promote early oral hygiene habits.

On 20 July 2014, Adanan led a MoH team in delivering medical supplies and aid to patients' homes in Brunei–Muara District. He highlighted collaboration with RIPAS Hospital's welfare unit to assist patients by improving living conditions and providing essentials like wheelchairs and beds. The Ramadan initiative aimed to enhance the quality of life for low-income families. Adanan inaugurated the 2014 Mental Health Order, aligning it with WHO's 2013–2020 Mental Health Action Plan, and presented the code of practice to key government leaders, with the directive effective from 1 November to improve care for mental health patients. On 2 December, Adanan and Malaysia's Minister of Health, Subramaniam Sathasivam, signed documents to strengthen Brunei–Malaysia health cooperation, focusing on disease control, patient transfer, and addressing NCDs and mental health.

On 14 April 2015, Adanan endorsed the "Safe Food" theme at the World Health Day forum in Bandar Seri Begawan, stressing the importance of multi-sector collaboration and addressing emerging challenges such as global trade, advancements in food production technologies, and climate change. On 8 May, he launched the Allied Health Association and Forum, focusing on professionalism, ethical standards, and the necessity for allied health professionals to unite, innovate, and uphold integrity and accountability to improve service quality and public confidence in healthcare. On 22 October, Adanan's tenure as minister concluded following a broader cabinet reshuffle, with several senior officials being reassigned, and he was succeeded by Zulkarnain Hanafi.

== Legislative councillor ==
=== 19th LegCo session ===
By command of the sultan, Adanan was appointed to the LegCo of Brunei on 20 January 2023, under the "titled persons" category. During the 19th LegCo session on 4 March, he emphasised the importance of enhancing job seekers' skills, particularly among school dropouts, and called for strategic plans to support local MSMEs and increase exports through improved infrastructure and regulations. On 7 March, Adanan proposed that the Brunei Darussalam Central Bank take a more flexible approach, encouraging financial institutions to assist local businesses, including MSMEs, in securing loans for growth. On 25 March, he raised concerns about the competitiveness of Brunei's maritime industry, stressing the need for long-term planning and training to help local workers advance to senior positions, while also highlighting the importance of improving the competitiveness of local seafarers, whose wages are lower compared to neighbouring countries.

=== 20th LegCo session ===
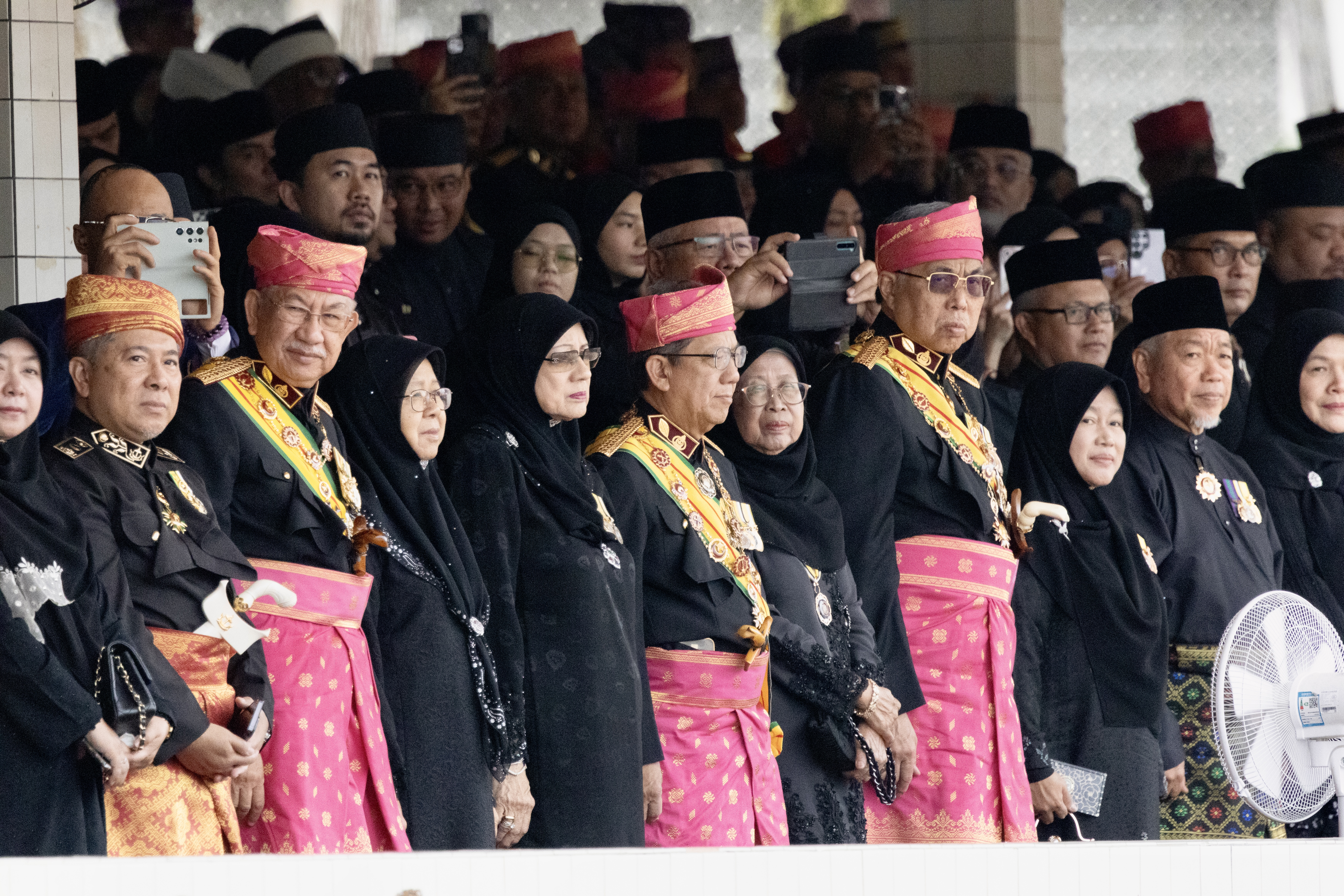
In court uniform, from left to right: Norarfan Zainal, Abdul Rahman Ibrahim, Suyoi Osman and Adanan in the 2024 sultan's birthday celebration

Adanan supported the sultan's call for LegCo members to engage with the public and stakeholders to address complaints and improve discussions, emphasising the importance of field trips for gaining knowledge and attracting FDIs to support economic growth. He highlighted the significance of RKN 12 for socioeconomic advancement and quality of life, advocating for open communication to resolve delays in project completion. Additionally, during the 7 March 2024 LegCo session, he raised concerns about the role of the Zakat, Wakaf and Baitulmal Affairs Department in overseeing halal certification and zakat matters, urging for improved efficiency and qualified personnel in handling such issues.

On 10 March 2024, Amin Liew Abdullah outlined fiscal consolidation measures and initiatives to improve governance, financial reporting, and digital adoption among cooperatives to support economic diversification, in response to Adanan's concerns about the budget deficit. Three days later, on 13 March, Adanan raised further concerns regarding the prevention of breaches of trust and corruption, seeking an update on the National Audit Committee's review of related reports, to which Amin Liew confirmed the committee's active involvement. On 16 March, Adanan inquired about the Department of Customs and Traditions' efforts to promote Bruneian customs, noting its success in exceeding its target with 88 briefings during the 2023–2024 fiscal year. Finally, on 19 March, Adanan discussed the National Housing Scheme, the Land Grant Scheme, public–private partnerships, the corporatisation of the Housing Development Department, housing design, and the substantial subsidies and extended payment terms for government-provided housing.

On 12 June 2024, during the ASEAN Inter-Parliamentary Assembly (AIPA) Caucus Meeting, Adanan stressed the importance of addressing both the challenges and benefits of technological change, underscoring Brunei's commitment to inclusive digital initiatives while managing concerns around cybersecurity and digital security. Later, on 23 October, at the 45th AIPA General Assembly, Adanan contributed to drafting resolutions on social issues, advocating for gender-responsive parliaments and promoting greater political engagement for women within ASEAN. On 21 November, he was appointed as a member of the Council of Succession.

== Personal life ==
Adanan is married to Datin Paduka Hajah Salmah binti Haji Hanafiah, who served as Brunei's auditor general from 2002 to 2008. Together, they have a son, Edzwan Zukri, who is the chairman of Makan Ceria and the acting managing director of TAIB Corporation. The family resides in Jalan Lambak Kanan, Berakas.

== Titles, styles and honours ==
=== Titles and styles ===
On 24 April 2004, Adanan was honoured by Sultan Hassanal Bolkiah with the manteri title of Pehin Orang Kaya Johan Pahlawan, bearing the style Yang Dimuliakan.

=== Honours ===
Adanan has been bestowed the following honours:

- Order of Setia Negara Brunei First Class (PSNB; 15 July 2006) – Dato Seri Setia
- Order of Setia Negara Brunei Fourth Class (PSB; 15 July 1990)
- Order of Seri Paduka Mahkota Brunei Second Class (DPMB) – Dato Paduka
- Sultan Hassanal Bolkiah Medal First Class (PHBS; 15 July 2010)
- Meritorious Service Medal (PJK)
- Excellent Service Medal (PIKB)
- Long Service Medal (PKL)
- Proclamation of Independence Medal (1997)
- Sultan of Brunei Silver Jubilee Medal (5 October 1992)
- National Day Silver Jubilee Medal (23 February 2009)

== Notes ==
- Hamzah Sulaiman (2003). "Negara Brunei Darussalam: Socio-Economic Concerns Amid Stability and Plenty". Southeast Asian Affairs. Singapore: ISEAS – Yusof Ishak Institute: 71–79. ISSN 0377-5437. JSTOR 27913227.

Political offices
Preceded by Suyoi Osman	4th Minister of Health; 29 May 2010 – 21 October 2015	Succeeded by Zulkarnain Hanafi
Preceded by Isa Ibrahim	3rd Minister of Home Affairs; 24 May 2005 – 28 May 2010	Succeeded by Badaruddin Othman
Preceded by Abidin Abdul Rashid	2nd Deputy Minister of Home Affairs; 9 August 2002 – 24 May 2005	Succeeded by Dani Ibrahim
