= Isa Ibrahim =

Bruneian civil servant and lawyer (born 1935)

Yang Berhormat Pehin Orang Kaya Laila Setia Bakti Di-Raja Dato Laila Utama Isa Ibrahim DK SPMB PSM PNBS GBE DSNB CVO PHBS PBLI PJK PKL
- عيسى بن إبراهيم
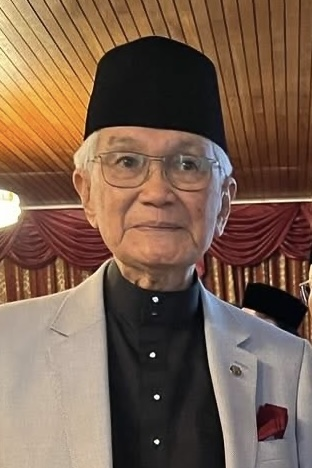
- Isa in 2024

Minister at the Prime Minister's Office
- Incumbent
- Assumed office 30 January 2018 Serving with Halbi Mohammad Yussof and Amin Liew Abdullah
- Monarch: Hassanal Bolkiah
- Deputy: Elinda C.A. Mohammad; Riza Yunos; Sufian Sabtu
- Preceded by: Abdul Rahman Ibrahim; Lim Jock Seng

Speaker of the Legislative Council of Brunei
- In office 10 February 2011 – 11 February 2015
- Prime Minister: Hassanal Bolkiah
- Preceded by: Pengiran Anak Kemaluddin
- Succeeded by: Abdul Rahman Taib

Minister of Home Affairs
- In office 20 October 1986 – 24 May 2005
- Deputy: Abidin Abdul Rashid; Adanan Yusof
- Preceded by: Hassanal Bolkiah
- Succeeded by: Adanan Yusof

Deputy Menteri Besar of Brunei
- In office 27 October 1970 – 1972
- Monarch: Omar Ali Saifuddien III
- Minister: Pengiran Muhammad Yusuf
- Preceded by: Pengiran Muhammad Ali
- Succeeded by: Office abolished

Personal details
- Born: 9 February 1935 (age 91) Brunei
- Spouse: Rosnah Abdullah
- Children: 5; including Ahmad
- Parent: Ibrahim Mohammad Jahfar (father)
- Relatives: Abbas Al-Sufri (brother); Musa Adnin (nephew); Anisha Rosnah (granddaughter)
- Education: University of Southampton (BA)
- Occupation: Civil servant; lawyer

Isa bin Ibrahim (born 9 February 1935) is a Bruneian aristocrat, civil servant and lawyer. He served as Brunei's second deputy menteri besar (chief minister) from 1970 to 1972, minister of home affairs from 1986 to 2005, and was appointed speaker of the Legislative Council of Brunei (LegCo) from 2011 to 2015 before becoming the minister at the Prime Minister's Office (PMO) from 2018. Additionally, he has been serving as special adviser to Sultan Hassanal Bolkiah since 1971.

Once a close associate of Sultan Omar Ali Saifuddien III, Isa is a highly respected and influential Bruneian aristocrat. He maintains a similar relationship with the sultan's son and successor, Hassanal Bolkiah. He became Brunei's first British-educated scholar and its first barrister-at-law upon being called to the bar at Middle Temple, London, in 1962.

== Early life and education ==
Isa was born in Brunei on 9 May 1935 at 4:45 p.m. to Ibrahim Mohammad Jahfar, a Labuan-born statesman who became Brunei's first chief minister, and Saadiah Tahir, a native of Kampong Sungai Kedayan. He came from a distinguished family, with several accomplished siblings, including his brother Abbas Al-Sufri, a prominent civil servant, and Adnin, a businessman.

He began his early education at Brunei Town Malay School, but his studies were interrupted by World War II. He later attended Kilanas Malay School for a brief period during the Japanese occupation. After the war, he enrolled at the Roman Catholic School (now St. George's School), before moving to Penang to study at Stamford School. Upon completing his sixth form, he returned to Brunei and, at the age of 16, began working as a clerk in the Department of Education in early 1951. However, just a year later, he resigned with only 24 hours' notice and boarded a ship from Labuan to Singapore the following day, where he continued his education at Victoria Afternoon School. A year later, he transferred to the newly opened Beatty Secondary School, where he completed his studies and earned a Cambridge GCSE, securing credits in six subjects. He was the first Bruneian Malay student to achieve this qualification after the war.

In January 1956, he was awarded a government scholarship to study in England and enrolled at a tutorial school in Sevenoaks, Kent. Unfortunately, his studies were interrupted by illness, leading to his admission to King Edward VII's Hospital in Midhurst, Sussex, where he underwent major surgery and spent a full year recovering. After his recovery, he enrolled at Brighton Technical College to take the A-level exams and successfully completed them within a year. In October 1958, he began his studies at the University of Southampton, graduating with a Bachelor of Arts (Hons) in law in July 1961. Later that year, he sat for the Bar final exams in London and was accepted into the English Bar by Middle Temple in February 1962. As a result, he became the first Bruneian to graduate from a British university and the first Bruneian to become a lawyer. In 1961, he was also elected president of the Brunei Students Association in the United Kingdom, a position he held until his return to Brunei.

== Career ==
Upon his return to Brunei, Isa began working in the law department in March 1962 as an assistant legal advisor. He was then posted to Kuala Lumpur, where he served at the Attorney General's Office as a deputy public prosecutor. In this role, he managed several cases before both the high court and the court of appeal. Isa returned to Brunei after the rebellion erupted at the end of 1962. It was during his time in Kuala Lumpur that he met Idris Talog Davies. Isa also accompanied Sultan Omar Ali Saifuddien III on numerous overseas trips, including a world tour in 1964. Later that year, he was appointed assistant attorney general.

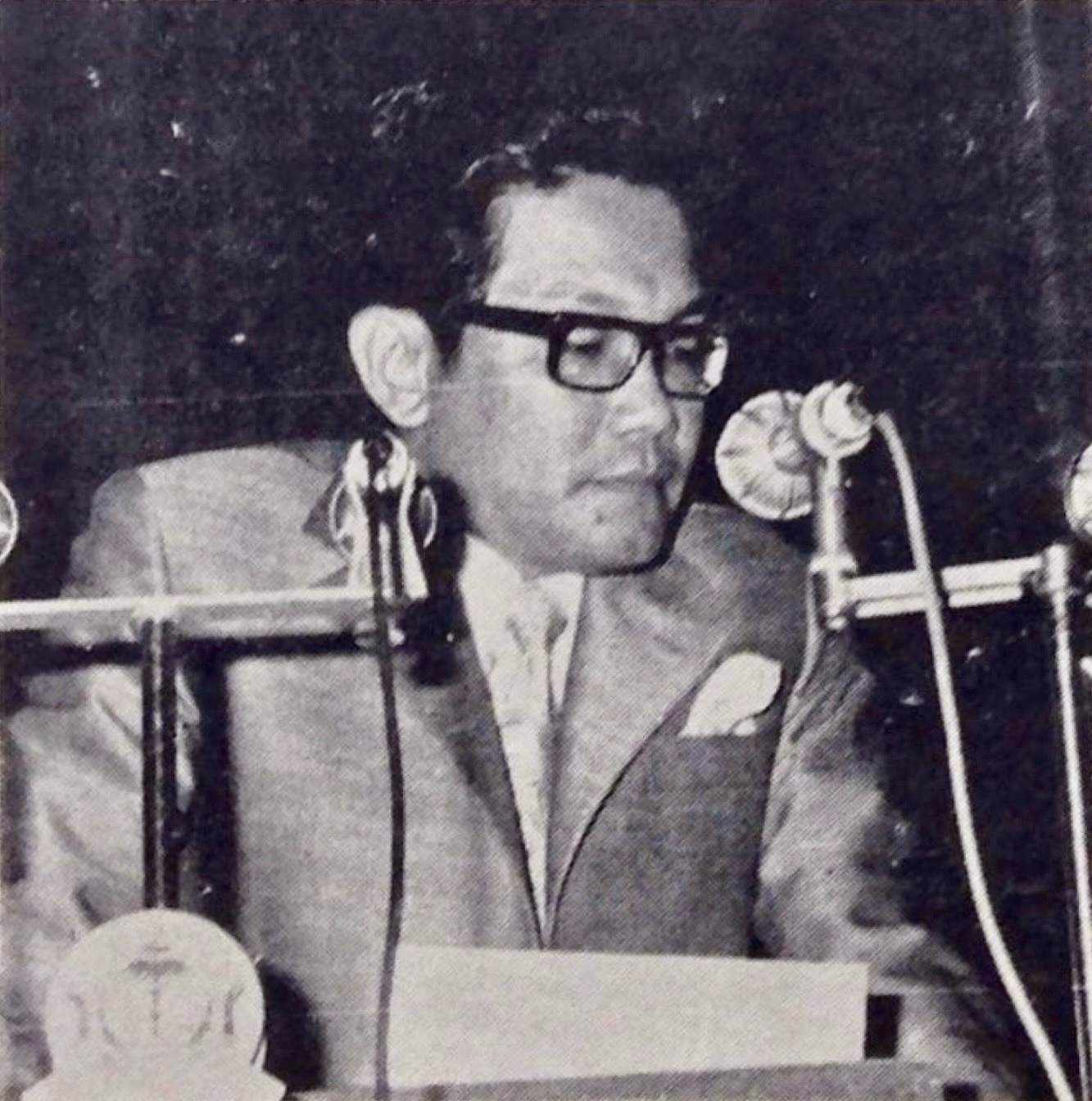
Isa, pictured around 1972

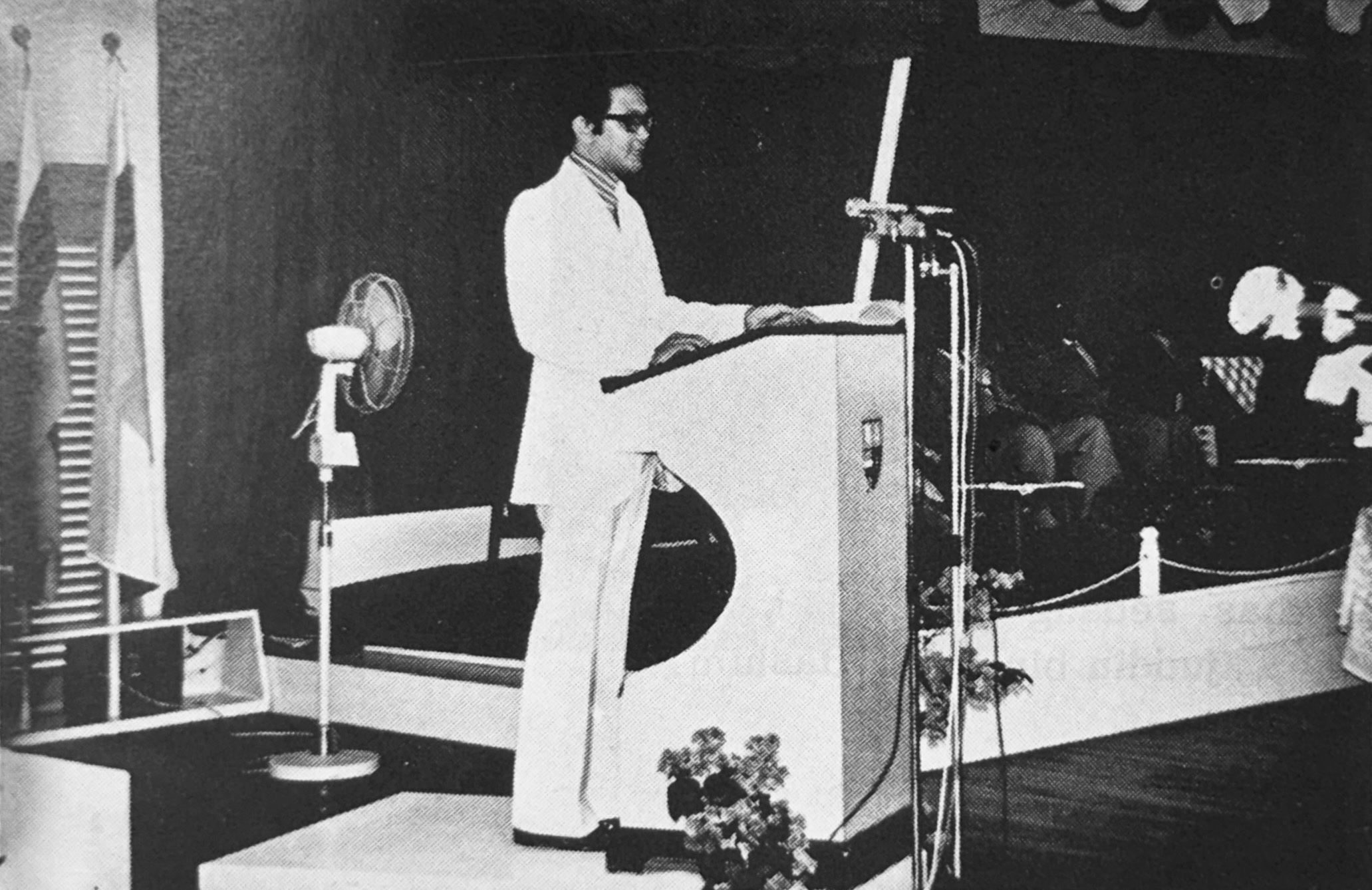
Isa giving a speech at the Sultan Hassanal Bolkiah Teachers College in 1973

In September 1965, Isa traveled to London to attend a five-month course for legal officers from Commonwealth countries at Marlborough House. In 1969, he spent two months in the United States, where he participated in an international law seminar at Harvard University Law School. In January 1968, he was promoted to deputy attorney general and frequently served as acting attorney general in the absence of the official holder. On 27 October 1970, Isa was appointed deputy chief minister, and in October 1971, he became the general advisor to Sultan Hassanal Bolkiah. On 26 March 1972, he officiated at the opening of Seri Kenangan Beach as a recreational area and helped establish the weekly market.

Following the death of his father, Sultan Hassanal Bolkiah announced a reshuffled cabinet on 20 October 1986 through Radio Television Brunei. This reorganisation introduced thirteen ministerial positions, with Isa appointed as the minister of home affairs and special adviser to the sultan. Despite these changes, the sultan stressed that the government’s policies would remain consistent. In line with the concept of Melayu Islam Beraja, Isa played a key role in a public meeting in December 1989, where over a thousand citizens voiced their opinions on government policies. This event marked a shift toward fostering greater public involvement in matters like state security, land, and immigration policies. While there were differing opinions on Islamic law within the government, the sultan’s administration, led by Isa, maintained its commitment to liberal institutions while ensuring political stability. Though the meeting represented a significant step in public engagement, it remains uncertain whether such gatherings will become a regular occurrence.

At the ASEAN Council on Petroleum meeting in Brunei in October 1991, Isa highlighted the impact of the Gulf War on oil supply stability and stressed the need for ASEAN to achieve self-sufficiency in crude oil. He pointed out that while ASEAN's oil demand was expected to reach 2.2 million barrels per day by 1995, the combined production in 1990 was only 2.3 million barrels per day, emphasizing the urgent need for ASEAN to enhance efforts to meet future oil demands. In September 1993, Isa introduced reforms for the Majlis Perunding Mukim dan Kampong (MPMK) to foster a strong sense of nationhood and support the sultan's leadership. These reforms aimed to make community leaders more effective in bridging the government and the people, with the mukim and kampong councils being managed systematically under new regulations and a management board formed by the Ministry of Home Affairs. He also attended the 10th ASEAN Labour Ministers' Meeting (ALMM) in Singapore from 16 to 17 May 1994. Later, at the Thirteenth ALMM in Yangon on 14 May 1999, he was elected as vice-chairman, as noted in the statement by Rodolfo Severino Jr., Secretary-General of ASEAN, regarding "The Labor Factor in ASEAN's Recovery."

Isa emphasised the importance of accurate information dissemination to project a positive image of ASEAN during the 7th ASEAN Ministers Responsible for Information Conference in Jerudong on 18 October 2002. However, in the cabinet reshuffle on 24 May 2005, he was replaced by Adanan Yusof as the minister of home affairs, which marked the end of his service as a member of the Council of Cabinet Ministers and the Privy Council.

By the command of the sultan, it was announced that Isa had been appointed as the speaker of the LegCo, replacing Pengiran Anak Kemaluddin, with the appointment taking effect on 10 February 2011. During the final meeting of the 7th LegCo session on 14 March 2012, he urged LegCo members to continue visiting government projects across the country to monitor their progress and provide constructive feedback. On 27 March 2013, during the first session of the 9th LegCo, he addressed the assembly, highlighting that 606 questions and proposals were submitted by appointed members, and stressed the importance of discussing the effective implementation of the annual budget to fulfil the directives of the sultan. Additionally, on 13 May 2013, as president of the 34th ASEAN Inter-Parliamentary Assembly (AIPA), he received a courtesy visit from AIPA delegates and representatives from regional and international organizations at the Rizqun International Hotel, where they exchanged gifts and engaged in discussions.

During a cabinet reshuffle on 30 January 2018, Isa was appointed as the minister at the PMO, serving alongside Halbi Mohammad Yussof and Amin Liew Abdullah. In his role, he highlighted the significant developments in Temburong, particularly the completion of the Temburong Bridge and the establishment of the Temburong District Development Authority, which were expected to improve the quality of life, boost economic activity, and contribute to the nation's growth, as he mentioned during his speech at the 16th session of the LegCo on 10 March 2020. He retained his positions in the 2022 cabinet reshuffle on 7 June.

== Personal life ==
On his journey back to Brunei after being accepted as a lawyer in the United Kingdom, he made a stop in Singapore where he married Rosie Lim (now Rosnah), whom he had known since their school days. At the time, Rosnah was a policewoman and one of only four female officers in the Singapore Police Force. They had five children, including twin daughters. One of his sons, Ahmad, served as the attorney general of Brunei from 2020 to 2024. His daughter, Siti Mariam, has a daughter, Anisha Rosnah, who later married Prince Abdul Mateen in 2024.

== Books ==
- Isa bin Ibrahim (2013). Brunei and Malaysia: Why Sultan Omar Ali Saifuddin Refused to Join the Federation. London: I.B. Tauris. ISBN 978-1-78076-436-8.

== Titles, styles and honours ==
=== Titles and styles ===
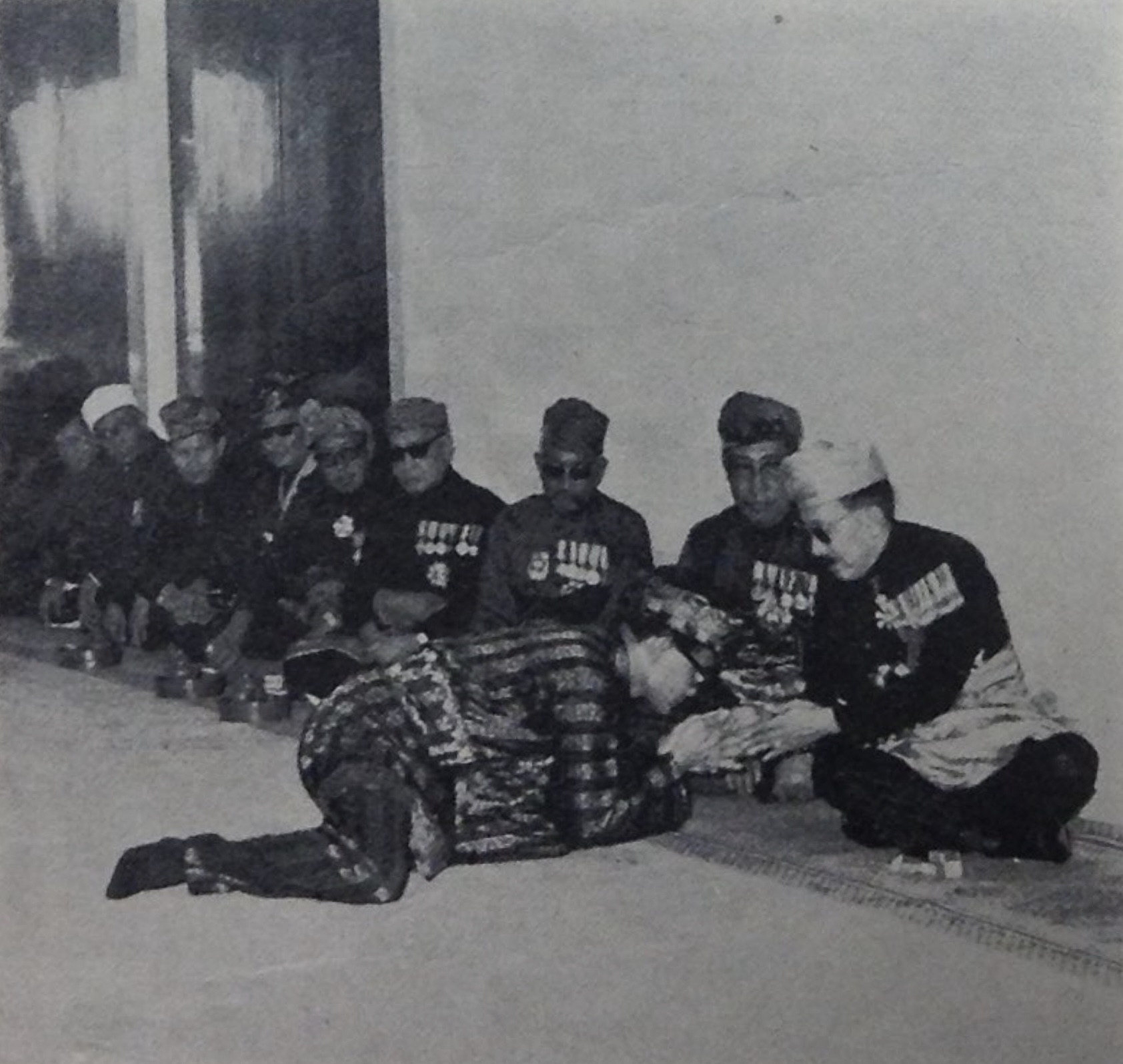
Isa greeting Sultan Omar Ali Saifuddien III at the title bestowment ceremony held at the Lapau in 1968

On 11 May 1968, Isa was honoured by Sultan Hassanal Bolkiah with the manteri title of Pehin Orang Kaya Laila Setia Bakti Di-Raja, bearing the style Yang Dimuliakan.

=== Honours ===
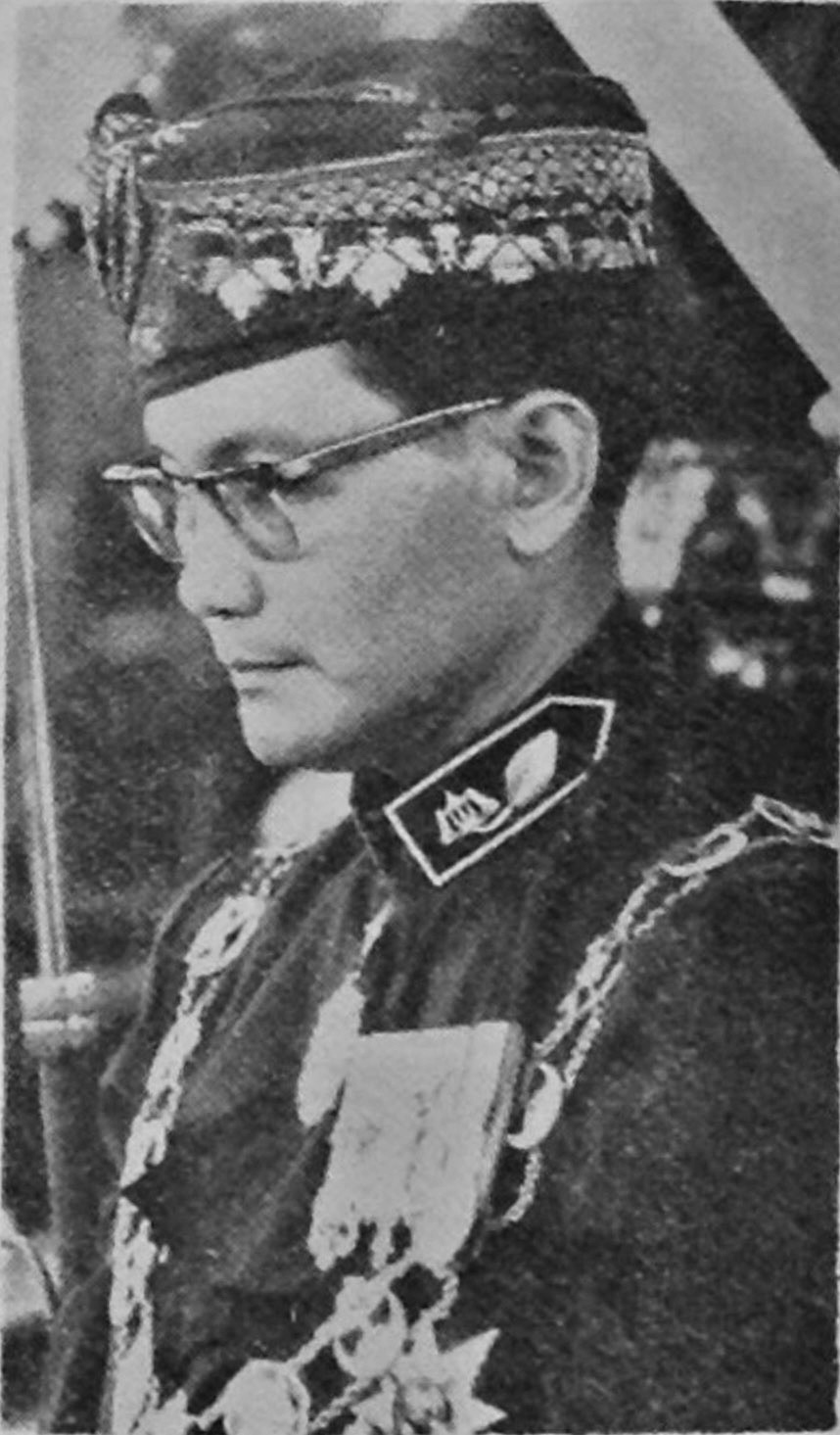
Isa in his court uniform, c. 1970

Isa has been bestowed the following honours:

National

- Family Order of Laila Utama (DK; 1972) – Dato Laila Utama
- Family Order of Seri Utama (DK; May 1968) – Dato Seri Utama
- Order of Seri Paduka Mahkota Brunei First Class (SPMB; January 1970) – Dato Seri Paduka
- Order of Setia Negara Brunei Second Class (DSNB; 29 September 1965) – Dato Setia
- Order of Setia Negara Brunei Third Class (SNB; 21 December 1963)
- Sultan Hassanal Bolkiah Medal First Class (PHBS; 1968)
- Pingat Bakti Laila Ikhlas (PBLI)
- Meritorious Service Medal (PJK)
- Long Service Medal (PKL; 1987)
- Proclamation of Independence Medal (10 March 1997)

Foreign

- Egypt:
  - Order of the Republic (1984)
- France:
  - Grand-officier of the Legion of Honour (1996)
- Malaysia:
  - Commander of the Order of Loyalty to the Crown of Malaysia (PSM; 1998) – Tan Sri
- Sarawak:
  - Knight Commander of the Most Exalted Order of the Star of Sarawak (PNBS; 1989) – Dato Sri
- Thailand:
  - Knight Grand Cross of the Order of the White Elephant (August 2002)
- United Kingdom:
  - Knight Grand Cross of the Order of the British Empire (GBE; 1992) – Sir
  - Officer of the Order of the British Empire (OBE; 1968)
  - Commander of the Royal Victorian Order (CVO; February 1972)
  - Senior Associate Member of St. Antony's College, University of Oxford (October 2007)
  - Honorary Member of Magdalene College, University of Cambridge (October 2007)
  - Honorary Doctor of Law from University of Southampton (1995)

=== Things named after him ===
- Jalan Pehin Dato Isa, a road named after him in Bandar Seri Begawan.

Political offices
Preceded by Pengiran Anak Kemaluddin	7th Speaker of the Legislative Council of Brunei; 10 February 2017 – 11 February 2015	Succeeded by Abdul Rahman Taib
Preceded by Hassanal Bolkiah	2nd Minister of Home Affairs; 20 October 1986 – 24 May 2005	Succeeded by Adanan Yusof
Preceded by Pengiran Muhammad Ali	2nd Deputy Menteri Besar of Brunei; 27 October 1970 – 1972	Succeeded by Office abolished
