= Brunei and Malaysia =

2013 book by Isa Bin Ibrahim

Brunei and Malaysia: Why Sultan Omar Ali Saifuddin Refused to Join the Federation
- Author: Isa Bin Ibrahim
- Subject: Decolonization; Brunei
- Genre: History
- Publisher: I B Tauris & Co Ltd
- English publication date: 30 June 2013
- Media type: Print (Hardcover)
- Pages: 288
- ISBN: 978-1-78076-436-8

Brunei and Malaysia: Why Sultan Omar Ali Saifuddin Refused to Join the Federation is a 2013 book written by Isa Bin Ibrahim, a prominent member of the delegation of Sultan Omar Ali Saifuddin of Brunei with Neil Lawson QC, a London lawyer acting as the constitutional adviser on the formation of Malaysia. The book offers an inside perspective on Brunei's determination to retain its territory as an oil-rich self-governing state, contrasted with the British desire that Brunei should become part of the new federation to help counter the regional influence of China.

== Description ==
Tunku Abdul Rahman and most of his senior cabinet ministers, including Tun Abdul Razak, Razali Ismail and Tan Siew Sin, met with the Sultan of Brunei to negotiate conditions including:

- The number of seats in legislature and parliament
- Control of oil, gas and mineral exploration
- Production, monetary autonomy and Brunei's earlier investments
- Method of taxation
- Authority in education and welfare (sovereign wealth fund)
- Matters of religion and citizenship
- The security of Brunei, and the position of the Sultan
- The status of Brunei within the proposed new federation of Malaysia.

Brunei pulled out of the negotiations before the Malaysia Agreement was signed on 9 July 1963 and subsequently became independent from the United Kingdom on 1 January 1984 as a Commonwealth monarchy.
