= Abidin Abdul Rashid =

Bruneian civil servant (1939–2010)

Yang Dimuliakan Pehin Orang Kaya Saiful Mulok Dato Seri Paduka Abidin Abdul Rashid SPMB POAS PHBS PJK PKL
- عابدين عبدالرشيد
- Official portrait, c. 1986

1st Deputy Minister of Home Affairs
- In office 20 October 1986 – 9 August 2002
- Monarch: Hassanal Bolkiah
- Minister: Isa Ibrahim
- Preceded by: Office established
- Succeeded by: Adanan Yusof

Personal details
- Born: 10 August 1939 Kampong Danau, Tutong, Brunei
- Died: 22 November 2010 (aged 71) Raja Isteri Pengiran Anak Saleha Hospital, Bandar Seri Begawan, Brunei
- Resting place: Jame' Asr Hassanil Bolkiah Cemetery, Bandar Seri Begawan, Brunei
- Spouse: Fatimah Razali
- Children: 6; including Aminuddin Ihsan
- Education: Seria English School; Sultan Omar Ali Saifuddien College; Carleton University; Manchester University
- Occupation: Civil servant

Abidin bin Abdul Rashid (10 August 1939 – 22 November 2010) was a Bruneian aristocrat and civil servant of Tutong descent. He served as the first deputy minister of home affairs from 1986 to 2002 and was later appointed to the Privy Council, where he remained a member until his death in 2010.

== Early life and education ==
Abidin was born on 10 August 1939 in Kampong Danau, Tutong District, as the son of Orang Kaya Perwira Abdul Rashid bin Orang Kaya Yussoff, a ketua kampung. He had several siblings, including Badaruddin and Rashidah. He began his early education at Danau Malay School from 1948 to 1952 before earning his Sarawak Junior Certificate at Seria English School, now known as Anthony Abell College, from 1953 to 1955. He then continued his studies at Sultan Omar Ali Saifuddien College from 1956 to 1957.

== Career ==
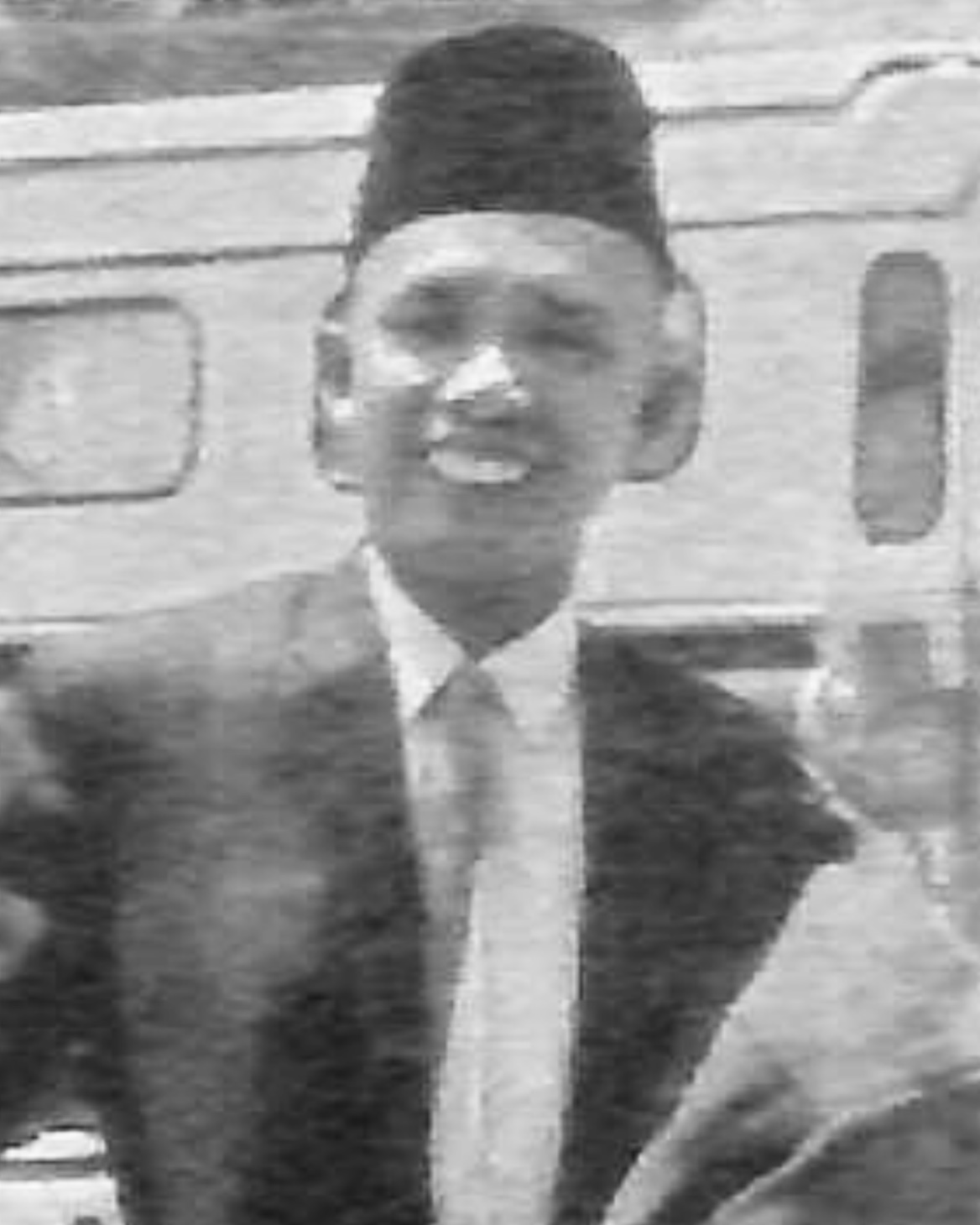
Abidin, c. 1966

On 6 April 1957, Abidin began his first employment with the government as an official in the Information Department. He joined Brunei Administration Services as a cadet officer two years later. As a top government servant, he was elevated to many administrative positions such as the assistant district officer of Belait.

Abidin served as the acting district officer of Temburong from 8 November 1961 to 4 April 1962. He later resumed the role for an unspecified period until 10 September 1962, when he left to attend a Public Administration Special Course Certificate from Carleton University in Ottawa, Canada. This departure proved to be a fortunate turn of events for him, as his successor, Pengiran Besar Kula, was killed during the Brunei revolt in December 1962.

Abidin served as an administrative officer at the Senior Administrative Office from 1963 to 1974. As a representative of Brunei, he, alongside Pengiran Abdul Momin, attended a United Nations seminar on human rights for developing countries held in Kabul, Afghanistan, from 12 to 18 May 1964. During this period, from 1966 to 1967, he pursued further studies, completing the same course at Manchester University in England. In 1968, he served as the financial secretary of the Coronation Administrative Committee.

Abidin served as the Land Transport Controller from 1974 to 1979 before being reassigned to the roles of National Registration Commissioner, Immigration, and Registration Status of Citizenship Controller from 1979 to 1986.

After retiring from public service, Abidin was appointed as deputy minister of home affairs from 20 October 1986 to 9 August 2002, during which he frequently served as the acting minister of home affairs. On 30 August 2002, a farewell ceremony was held in his honour at the Fire Services Department in Berakas, where Isa Ibrahim presented him with a gift in recognition of his service while also welcoming his successor, Adanan Yusof. Shortly after, on 5 September 2002, Sultan Hassanal Bolkiah appointed Abidin as a member of the Privy Council of Brunei, a position he held until his passing.

== Death and funeral ==
Abidin died at the age of 71 on 22 November 2010 at Raja Isteri Pengiran Anak Saleha Hospital in Bandar Seri Begawan. His funeral took place the same day at his residence in Kampong Lambak 'A', attended by Prince Al-Muhtadee Billah, Prince Mohamed Bolkiah, and Sultan Hassanal Bolkiah. The state mufti, Abdul Aziz Juned, led the funeral prayer. Following the prayers, the sultan and other attendees helped carry the coffin before it was transported in a hearse. Abidin was laid to rest at Jame' Asr Hassanil Bolkiah Cemetery in Kampong Kiarong.

== Personal life ==
Abidin was married to Datin Hajah Fatimah binti Dato Seri Setia Abang Haji Razali (Note: Fatimah Razali served as the joint vice president of Persatuan Siswazah Wanita (the Women Graduates' Association of Brunei) and was also the president of the Women's Council of Brunei. Her father, Abang Haji Razali bin Abang Haji Zainuddin, was a Muslim magistrate (kathi) in Belait District during the 1950s and later in Brunei and Muara during the 1960s. He was honoured with the SMB award in 1966 and the DSSUB in 1990.) and together they have six children; including Faaizah, Abdullah Soefri, Aminuddin Ihsan and Affendy. The family resides in Jalan Pasir Berakas, Kampong Lambak.

== Titles, styles and honours ==
=== Titles and styles ===
On 10 April 2004, Abidin was honoured by Sultan Hassanal Bolkiah with the manteri title of Pehin Orang Kaya Saiful Mulok, bearing the style Yang Dimuliakan.

=== Honours ===
Abidin has earned the following honours:

- Order of Seri Paduka Mahkota Brunei First Class (SPMB; 1999) – Dato Seri Paduka
- Order of Seri Paduka Mahkota Brunei Second Class (DPMB; 1979)
- Order of Seri Paduka Mahkota Brunei Third Class (SMB; 15 July 1970)
- Omar Ali Saifuddin Medal Second Class (POAS; 9 August 1967)
- Sultan Hassanal Bolkiah Medal (PHBS)
- Meritorious Service Medal (PJK; 2 June 1976)
- Long Service Medal (PKL)
- Coronation Medal (1 August 1968)
- Sultan of Brunei Silver Jubilee Medal (5 October 1992)

== Notes ==
Political offices
Preceded by Office established	1st Deputy Minister of Home Affairs; 20 October 1986 – 9 August 2002	Succeeded by Adanan Yusof
