= Neil Lawson =

British barrister and High Court judge

Sir Neil Lawson (8 April 1908 – 26 January 1996) was a British barrister and High Court judge.

== Life ==
He was the son of Robb Lawson and his wife Edith Marion Usherwood, and was called to the bar at the Inner Temple in 1929.

Lawson was a member of the Labour Party and the Haldane Society of Socialist Lawyers. He came to the notice of MI5 in 1932 when he acted for the Daily Worker. The following year, he was closely involved with Denis Pritt in the legal arguments about those falsely accused by the Nazis for the Reichstag fire. MI5's lack of sophistication in recording this has led to erroneous suggestions that Lawson defended Georgi Dimitrov in court. In reality, the Communist leader defended himself. But Lawson did help Pritt, who acted as the chairman of a high-profile international counter-trial of judicial persons in a Commission of Inquiry in London from 21 to 28 September 1933, and, by 1938 he was Secretary of the National Council for Civil Liberties (now Liberty).

Lawson took silk in 1955. In 1957 he began providing legal advice to the rulers of Malaya of the Federation of Malaya and later he was also the legal advisor to the Sultan of Brunei in 1963 on constitutional matters.

Lawson was appointed a Justice of the High Court (Queen's Bench Division) in 1971, receiving the customary knighthood. He retired from the bench in 1983.

== Honours ==
- Family Order of Seri Utama (DK; 23 September 1959) – Dato Seri Utama

== See also ==
- 20-point agreement
- Brunei and Malaysia
