= Halbi Mohammad Yussof =

Bruneian military officer and civil servant (born 1956)

Yang Berhormat Pehin Datu Lailaraja Major General (Retired) Dato Paduka Seri Halbi Mohammad Yussof DPKT SMB PGAT PHBS
- حالبي محمد يوسسوف
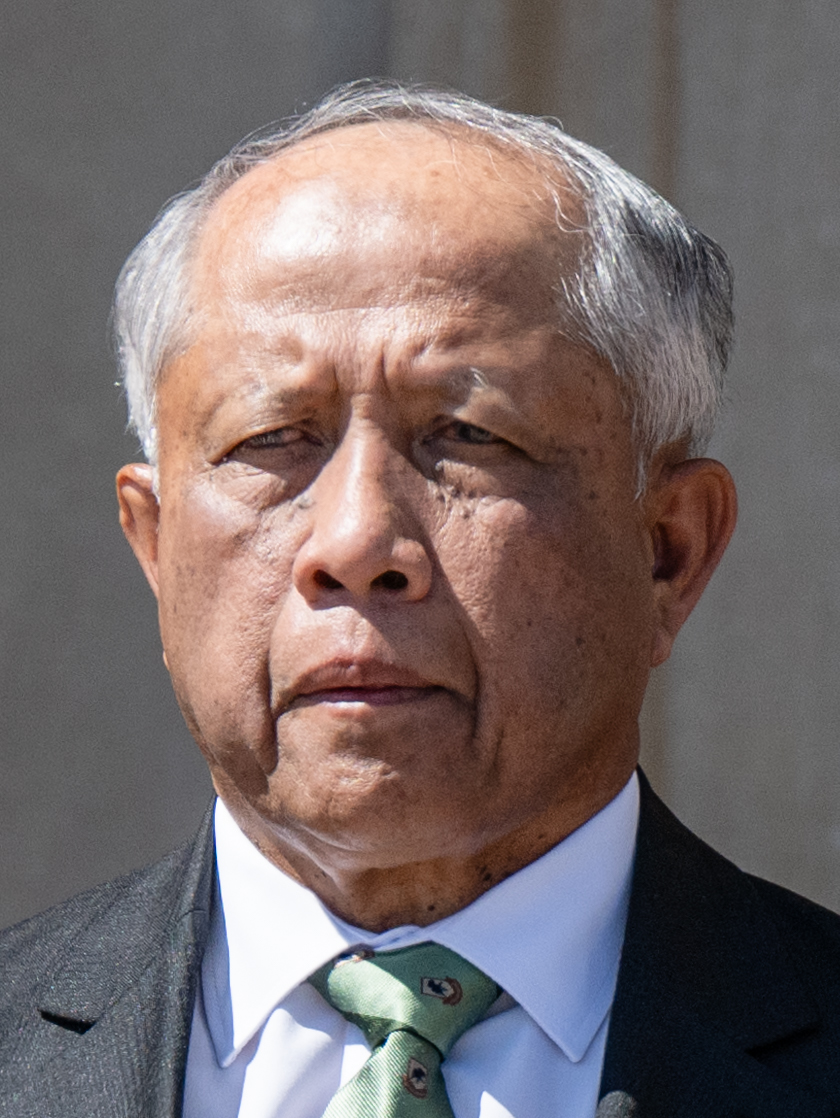
- Halbi in 2024

Minister at the Prime Minister's Office
- Incumbent
- Assumed office 7 June 2022 Serving with Amin Liew Abdullah and Isa Ibrahim
- Monarch: Hassanal Bolkiah
- Deputy: Sufian Sabtu; Riza Yunos
- Preceded by: Abdul Mokti Daud

Minister of Defence II
- Incumbent
- Assumed office 27 February 2023
- In office 30 January 2018 – 7 June 2022
- Preceded by: Office established

Minister of Culture, Youth and Sports
- In office 22 October 2015 – 29 January 2018
- Preceded by: Hazair Abdullah
- Succeeded by: Aminuddin Ihsan

Deputy Minister of Home Affairs
- In office 29 May 2010 – 22 October 2015
- Minister: Badaruddin Othman
- Preceded by: Dani Ibrahim
- Succeeded by: Office abolished
Diplomatic positions
High Commissioner of Brunei to Malaysia
In office 4 March 2010 – 29 May 2010
Preceded by	Amin Abdul Rahim
Succeeded by	Ishaaq Abdullah
Military positions
7th Commander Royal Brunei Armed Forces
In office 28 March 2003 – 31 December 2009
Preceded by	Jaafar Abdul Aziz
Succeeded by	Aminuddin Ihsan
4th Commander of the Royal Brunei Land Force
In office 1 February 2001 – 13 March 2003
Preceded by	Jaafar Abdul Aziz
Succeeded by	Abdu'r Rahmani

Personal details
- Born: 22 June 1956 (age 70) Kampong Kilanas, Brunei Town, Brunei
- Spouse: Kalshom Suhaili
- Education: Sixth Form Centre; Royal Military Academy Sandhurst
- Occupation: Civil servant; diplomat; military officer

Military service
- Branch/service: Royal Brunei Land Force
- Years of service: 1973–2009
- Rank: Major General
- Commands: Second Battalion RBLF; Directorate of Strategic Planning; Royal Brunei Land Force; Royal Brunei Armed Forces

Halbi bin Haji Mohammad Yussof (Note: The alternate spelling of his patronymic is written as "Md Yussof" instead of "Mohammad Yussof.") (born 22 June 1956) is a Bruneian aristocrat, civil servant, diplomat, and retired military officer. He has served as a minister at the Prime Minister's Office (PMO) since 2022 and as minister of defence II from 2018 to 2022 and again since 2023. Previously, he was deputy minister of home affairs from 2010 to 2015 and minister of culture, youth and sports from 2015 to 2018. During his military career, he commanded the Royal Brunei Land Force (RBLF) from 2001 to 2003 before becoming commander of the Royal Brunei Armed Forces (RBAF) from 2003 to 2009. Following his retirement from the military, he briefly served as Brunei's high commissioner to Malaysia in 2010 before transitioning into government roles.

== Early life and education ==
Halbi bin Mohammad Yussof was born on 22 June 1956 in Kampong Kilanas, a village near Bandar Seri Begawan. He received his early education at the Sixth Form Centre, now known as Duli Pengiran Muda Al-Muhtadee Billah College.

== Military career ==
On 11 August 1975, Halbi enlisted in the Royal Brunei Malay Regiment, the predecessor to the RBAF. After completing six months of basic training, he was enrolled at the British Army's Royal Military Academy Sandhurst in England on 6 February 1976, where he trained as an officer cadet. Upon completing Sandhurst's Standard Military Course Number 13, he was commissioned as a second lieutenant on 7 April 1977.

Throughout his career, Halbi attended various military training courses and staff colleges to enhance his expertise. His training included the Platoon Commanders' Battle Cadre in the United Kingdom in 1982, the Manpower and Security Officers' Course in Singapore in 1984, and the Junior Staff Course in Malaysia in 1985. He also completed the Overseas Joint Warfare program at the Australian Defence College in 1987, the All Arms Tactic Course in the United Kingdom in 1987, and the Command and Staff College in Quetta, Pakistan in 1989. Additionally, in 2000, he attended the Royal College of Defence Studies at Seaford House in London.

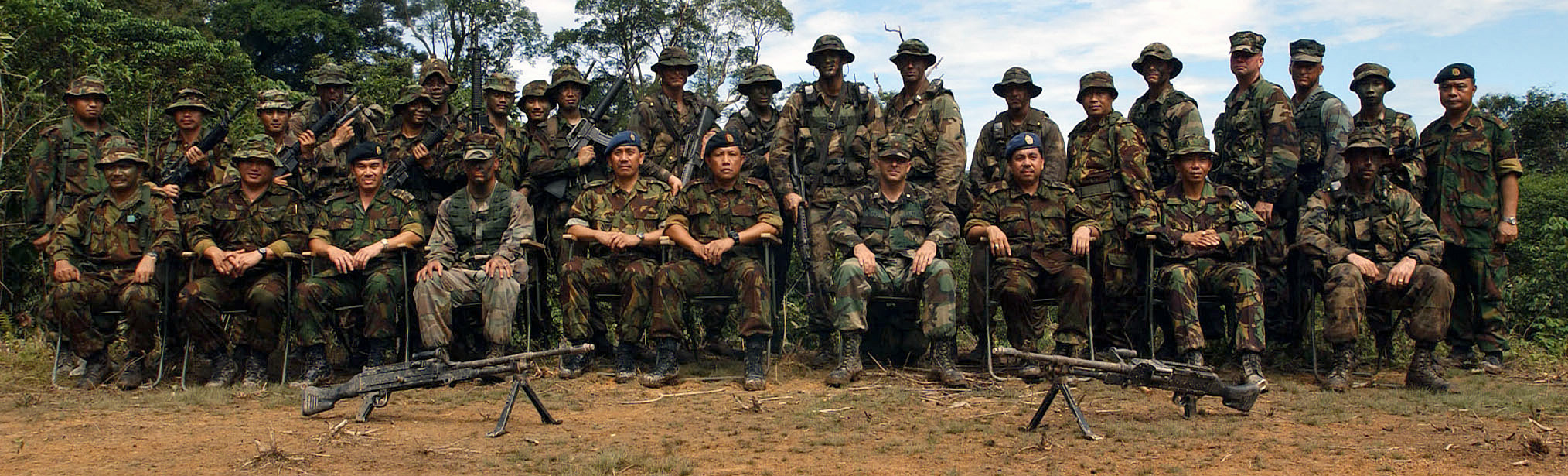
Halbi (seated sixth from the left) alongside U.S. Marines during the CARAT 2002 exercise

Halbi served in the RBAF and held several key leadership positions throughout his military career. He was appointed military assistant to the commander of the RBAF before taking command of the 2nd Battalion of the RBLF. He later served as Staff Officer Grade 1 in the Directorate of Operations and Plans and acted as director of the Directorate of Strategic Planning at the Ministry of Defence (MinDef). His leadership roles culminated in his appointment as the fourth commander of the RBLF on 1 February 2001, a position he held until 14 March 2003. He was promoted to Brigadier General on 21 November 2002 and further elevated to Major General on 1 March 2003. Shortly after, on 28 March 2003, he was appointed the seventh Commander of the Royal Brunei Armed Forces.

During his tenure, Halbi played a significant role in strengthening Brunei's military relations and strategic planning. On 8 January 2005, he received a farewell call from the Malaysian Chief of Defence Forces, Mohd Anwar Mohd Nor, where they discussed improving bilateral military relations between Brunei and Malaysia. He also oversaw the development of the Brunei Defence White Paper in 2004 and its subsequent update in 2007. On 3 June 2008, he and Yasmin Umar visited the RSS Steadfast at Muara Naval Base for the opening ceremony of Exercise Pelican. His final official visit to Singapore took place on 10 November 2009, where he met Desmond Kuek and inspected the guard of honour. His military career concluded with a handover ceremony at Tutong Camp on 31 December 2009, where he officially handed over his command to his successor, Aminuddin Ihsan.

== Political career ==
Following his retirement from his military career, in 2010, Halbi was appointed Brunei's high commissioner to Malaysia. In the 2010 Bruneian cabinet reshuffle on 29 May, he was appointed deputy minister at the Ministry of Home Affairs, a position he held until the 2015 Bruneian cabinet reshuffle on 22 October, when he was reappointed as minister of culture, youth and sports. On 18 November 2015, Halbi met with Khairy Jamaluddin during the ASEAN+ Young Leaders Summit to strengthen the relationship between Brunei and Malaysia and explore ways to enhance youth development and sports in both countries.

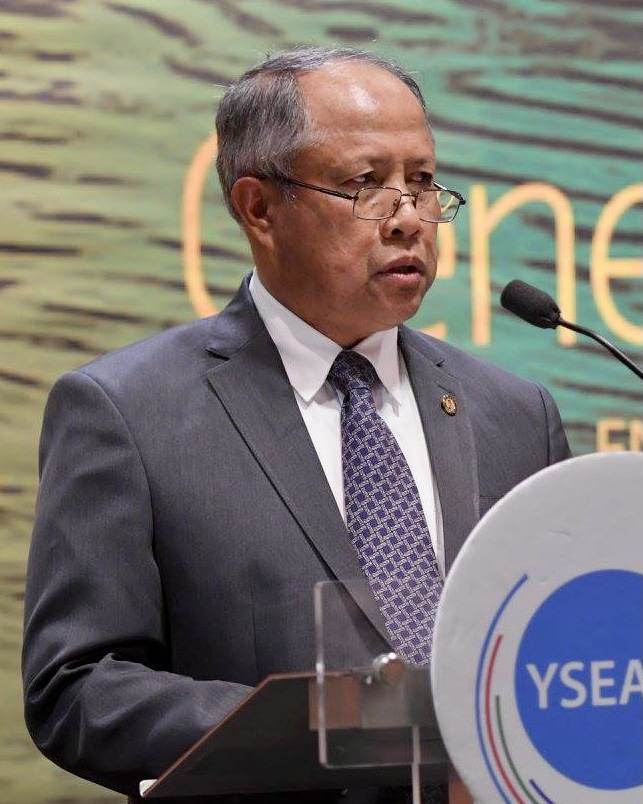
Halbi giving a speech in 2017

Following a cabinet reshuffle on 30 January 2018, Halbi was appointed the second minister in the MinDef. In response to the 2017–2018 North Korea crisis on 11 February 2018, minister Halbi and Erywan Yusof, in agreement with Taro Kono, decided to apply pressure on North Korea, including the implementation of United Nations Security Council Resolutions during the 45th Year of ASEAN-Japan Friendship and Cooperation. Later, on 14 August, he made an introductory visit to Singapore, meeting Ng Eng Hen to strengthen the relationship of Brunei and Singapore. In December, Halbi met with UNODC Executive Director Yury Fedotov in Brunei to discuss cooperation on security, crime prevention, and counterterrorism efforts in the ASEAN region.

From 17 to 20 June 2019, Halbi led a Bruneian delegation to Ufa for the X International Meeting of High-Ranking Officials Responsible for Security Matters, during which Russia and Brunei held consultations and signed a memorandum of understanding on bilateral security cooperation. On 30 August 2019, during his visit to Manila, he greeted the 16th International Monitoring Team in Mindanao at Ninoy Aquino International Airport in the Philippines.

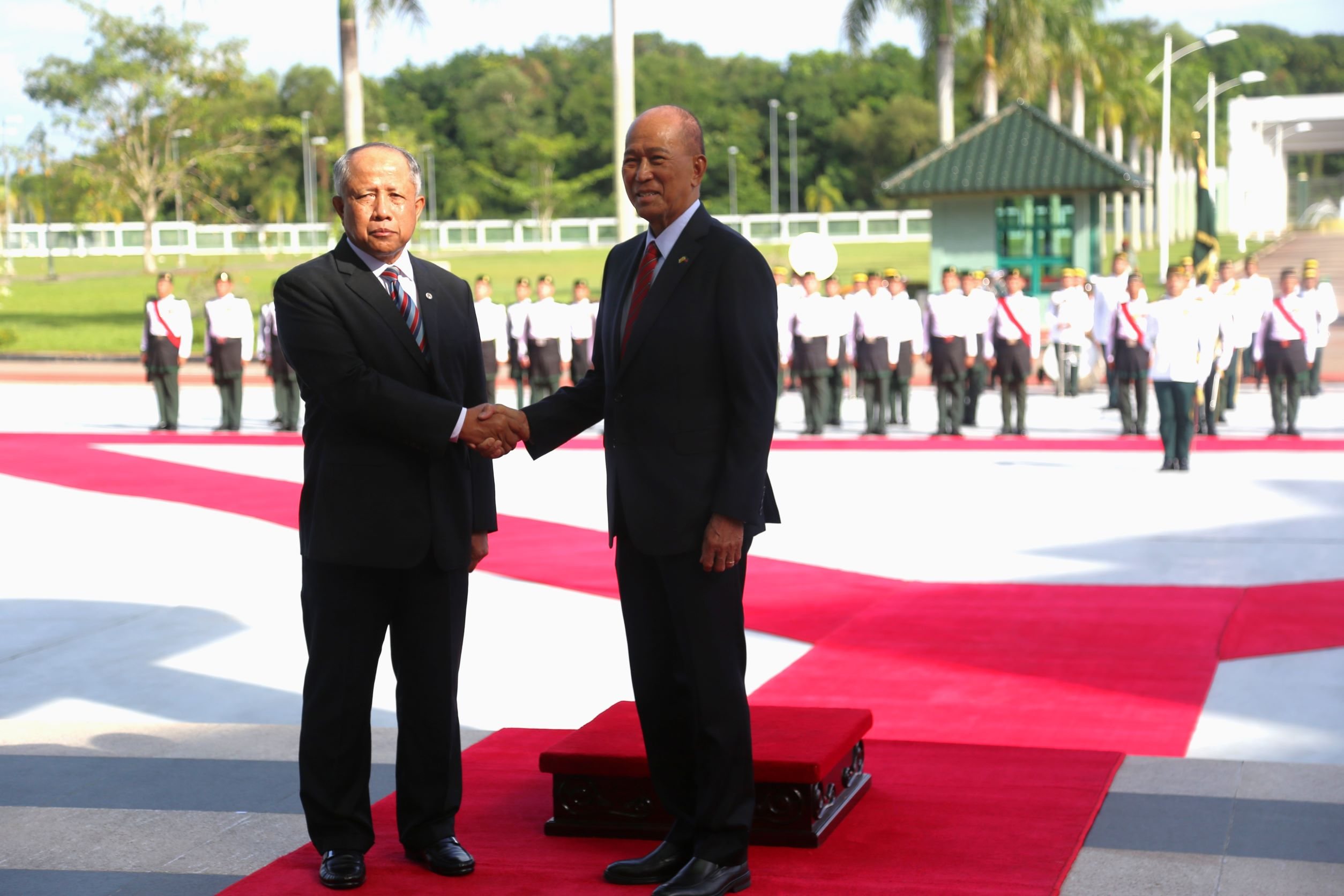
Halbi with Delfin N. Lorenzana at Bolkiah Garrison in 2022

On 7 June 2022, during a national cabinet reshuffle televised by Sultan Hassanal Bolkiah, Halbi was appointed as the newly appointed minister at the PMO. On 21 June, Japan's defence minister, Nobuo Kishi, congratulated Halbi on his new role, expressing concerns about regional security, the impact of the 2022 Russian invasion of Ukraine on international order, and the need to strengthen military relations between the two nations. Later, on 25 July 2022, while acting as the minister of health, Halbi noted the downward trend in COVID-19 cases in Brunei.

On 2 June 2023, Halbi attended the 20th Shangri-La Dialogue, where he met with ASEAN Secretary-General Kao Kim Hourn and several defence ministers, including those from New Zealand, Qatar, Sweden, and Ukraine, to discuss regional security and defence cooperation. Later, on 16 November, he met with Kao again at the 10th ASEAN Defence Ministers' Meeting Plus in Jakarta to address regional security challenges and explore ways to strengthen ASEAN defence cooperation.

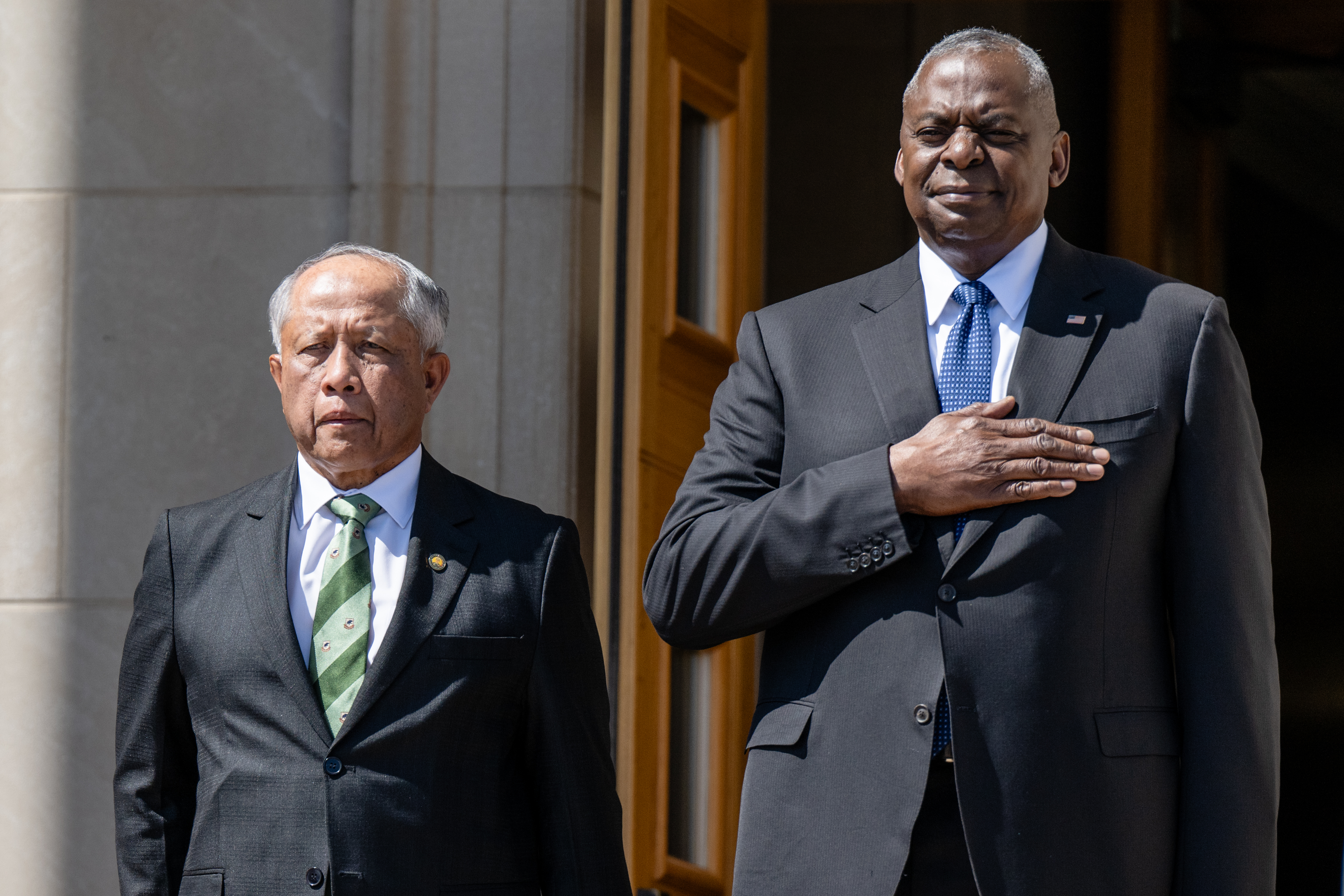
Halbi and Austin at the Pentagon in 2024

In his budget speech for the 2024/25 fiscal year, Halbi announced a record high defence budget of B$796.3 million, stressing the importance of strengthening Brunei's military intelligence and surveillance capabilities in response to growing security challenges. On 13 August 2024, he met with U.S. Secretary of Defense Lloyd Austin at the Pentagon to discuss security cooperation, maritime domain awareness, and the enhancement of Brunei–United States defence ties, marking four decades of diplomatic relations between the two nations. Later, during Crown Prince Al-Muhtadee Billah's official visit to Singapore from 10 to 14 September 2024, Halbi accompanied the delegation as part of the 10th Singapore-Brunei Young Leaders' Programme.

During the Brunei Petroleum Technology Exhibition and Conference 2025, held from 10 to 13 February, Halbi emphasised the importance of leveraging technology and innovation to enhance efficiency and sustainability in the hydrocarbon industry. Later, on 12 March, he announced efforts to improve Brunei's power generation efficiency and curb high consumption, highlighting initiatives such as the introduction of smart meters and stricter energy efficiency standards.

== Personal life ==
Halbi is married to Datin Hajah Kalshom binti Haji Suhaili, and together they have five children and five grandchildren. His hobbies include hiking, golf, fishing, and reading.

== Titles, styles and honours ==
=== Titles and styles ===
In 1996, Halbi was honoured by Sultan Hassanal Bolkiah with the manteri title of Pehin Datu Lailaraja, bearing the style Yang Dimuliakan.

=== Honours ===
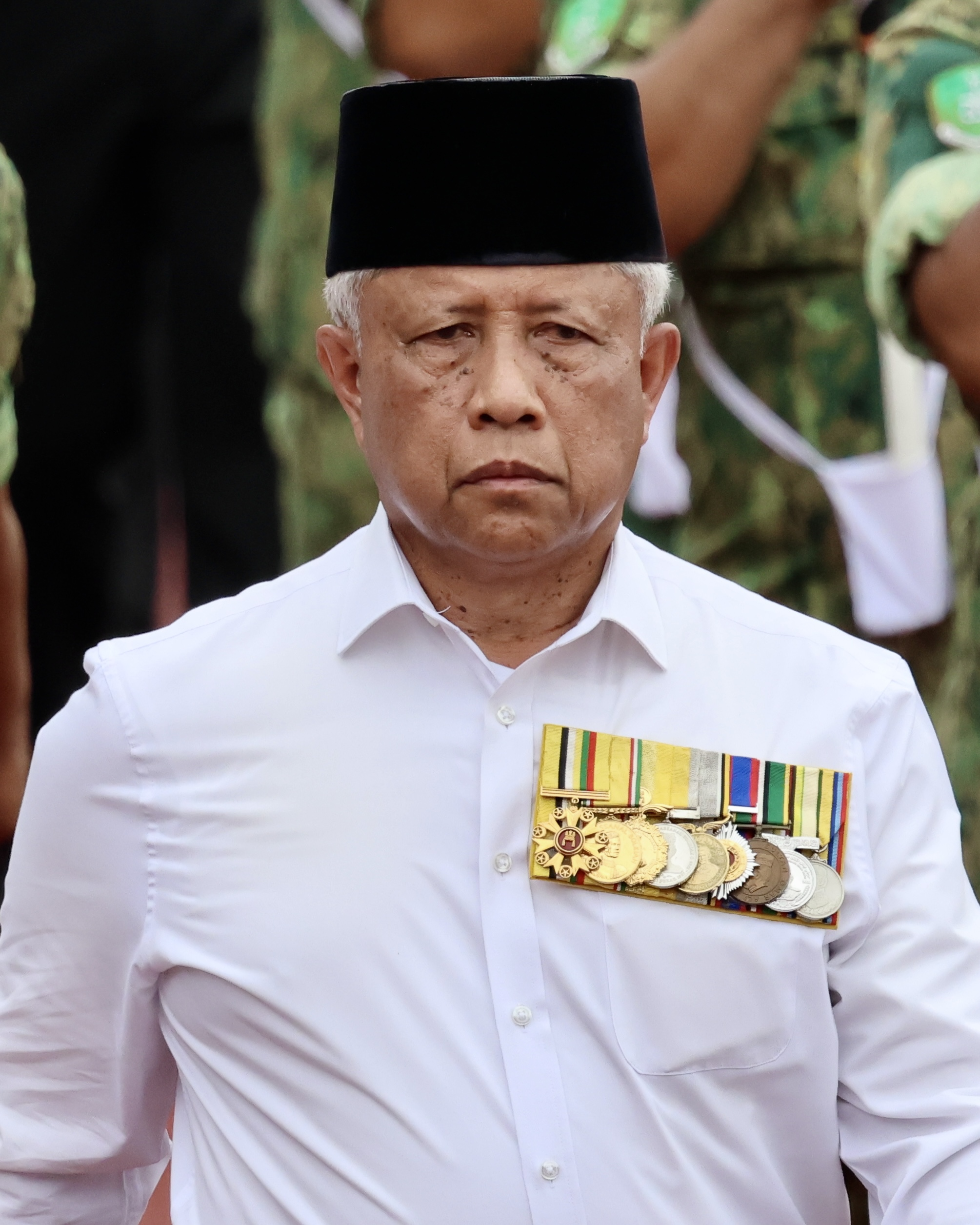
Halbi with his national honours in 2024

Halbi has been bestowed the following honours:

National

- Order of Paduka Keberanian Laila Terbilang First Class (DPKT; 15 July 2003) – Dato Paduka Seri
- Order of Seri Paduka Mahkota Brunei Third Class (SMB; 1986)
- Sultan Hassanal Bolkiah Medal First Class (PHBS; 15 July 2010)
- Sultan of Brunei Silver Jubilee Medal (5 October 1992)
- Royal Brunei Armed Forces Silver Jubilee Medal (31 May 1986)
- General Service Medal
- Long Service Medal and Good Conduct (PKLPB)
- Proclamation of Independence Medal (1997)

Foreign

- Indonesia:
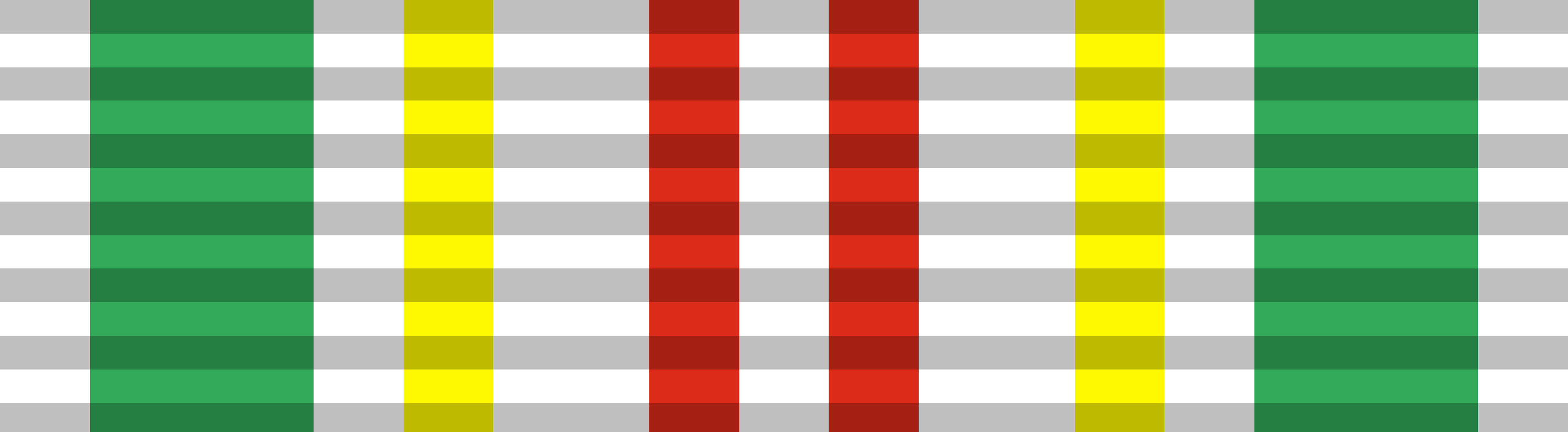
  - Bintang Yudha Dharma Utama (BYD; 20 December 2004)
  - Honorary Member of the Indonesian Marine Corps (21 December 2004)
  - Honorary Member of Kopassus (September 2002)
  - Honorary Fist Class Pilot Wing (9 November 2006)
  - Honorary Member of Korpaskhas (9 November 2006)
- Jordan:
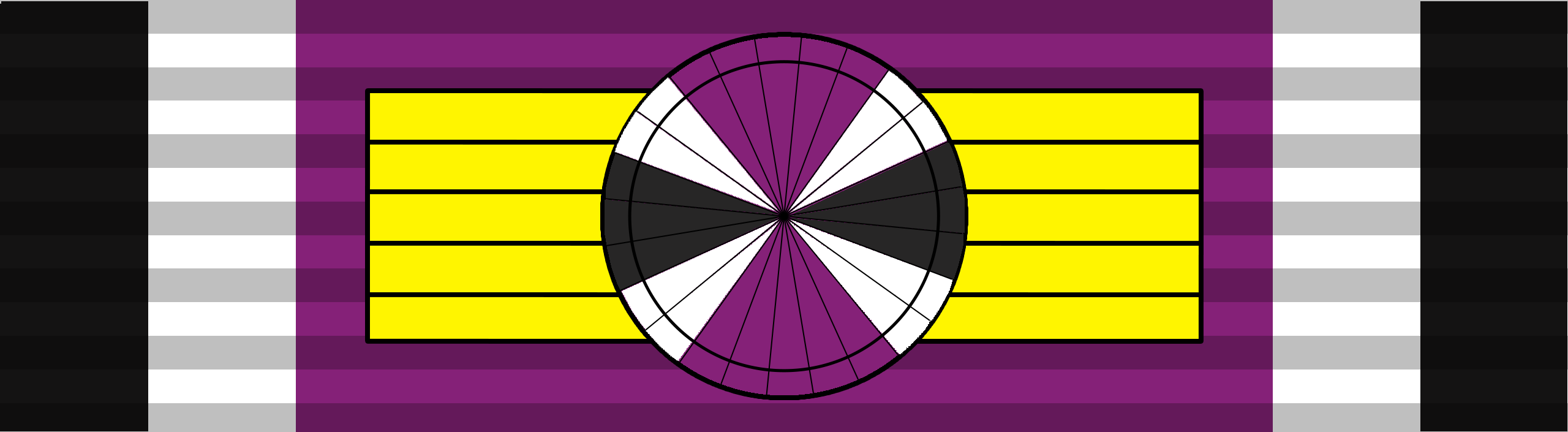
  - Grand Cordon of the Order of Independence (13 May 2008)
- Malaysia:
  - Courageous Commander of the Order of Military Service (PGAT; 30 November 2004)
  - Honorary Member of the 10th Parachute Brigade (7 September 2007)
- Pakistan:
  - Hilal-e-Imtiaz (28 June 2006)
  - Pakistan Command and Staff College Centenary Medal (2006)
- Philippines:
  - Commander of the Philippine Legion of Honor (CLH; 24 May 2006)
  - Philippine Army Combat Commander's Badge (27 November 2009)
  - Philippine Navy Command-At-Sea Badge (27 November 2009)
  - Philippine Air Force Gold Wing Badge (27 November 2009)
- Singapore:
  - Pingat Jasa Gemilang (Tentera) (PJG; 26 October 2002)
  - Darjah Utama Bakti Cemerlang (Tentera) (DUBC; 23 November 2004)
- Thailand:
  - Knight Grand Cross of the Order of the Crown of Thailand (PM (GCCT); 27 July 2009)

== Notes ==
Military offices
Preceded by Jaafar Abdul Aziz	4th Commander of the Royal Brunei Land Force; 1 February 2001 – 14 March 2003	Succeeded by Abdu'r Rahmani
Preceded by Jaafar Abdul Aziz	7th Commander of the Royal Brunei Armed Forces; 28 March 2003 – 31 December 2009	Succeeded by Aminuddin Ihsan
Diplomatic posts
Preceded by Amin Abdul Rahim	High Commissioner of Brunei to Malaysia; 4 March 2010 – 29 May 2010	Succeeded by Ishaaq Abdullah
Political offices
Preceded by Dani Ibrahim	4th Deputy Minister of Home Affairs; 29 May 2010 – 22 October 2015	Succeeded by Office abolished
Preceded by Hazair Abdullah	7th Minister of Culture, Youth and Sports; 22 October 2015 – 29 January 2018	Succeeded by Aminuddin Ihsan
Preceded by Office established Office reconvened	Minister of Defence II; 30 January 2018 – 7 June 2022; 27 February 2023 – present	Succeeded by Office abolished Incumbent
