= Rozan Yunos =

Bruneian civil servant and writer

Rozan Yunos SNB PJK PIKB PKL
- روزان يونوس
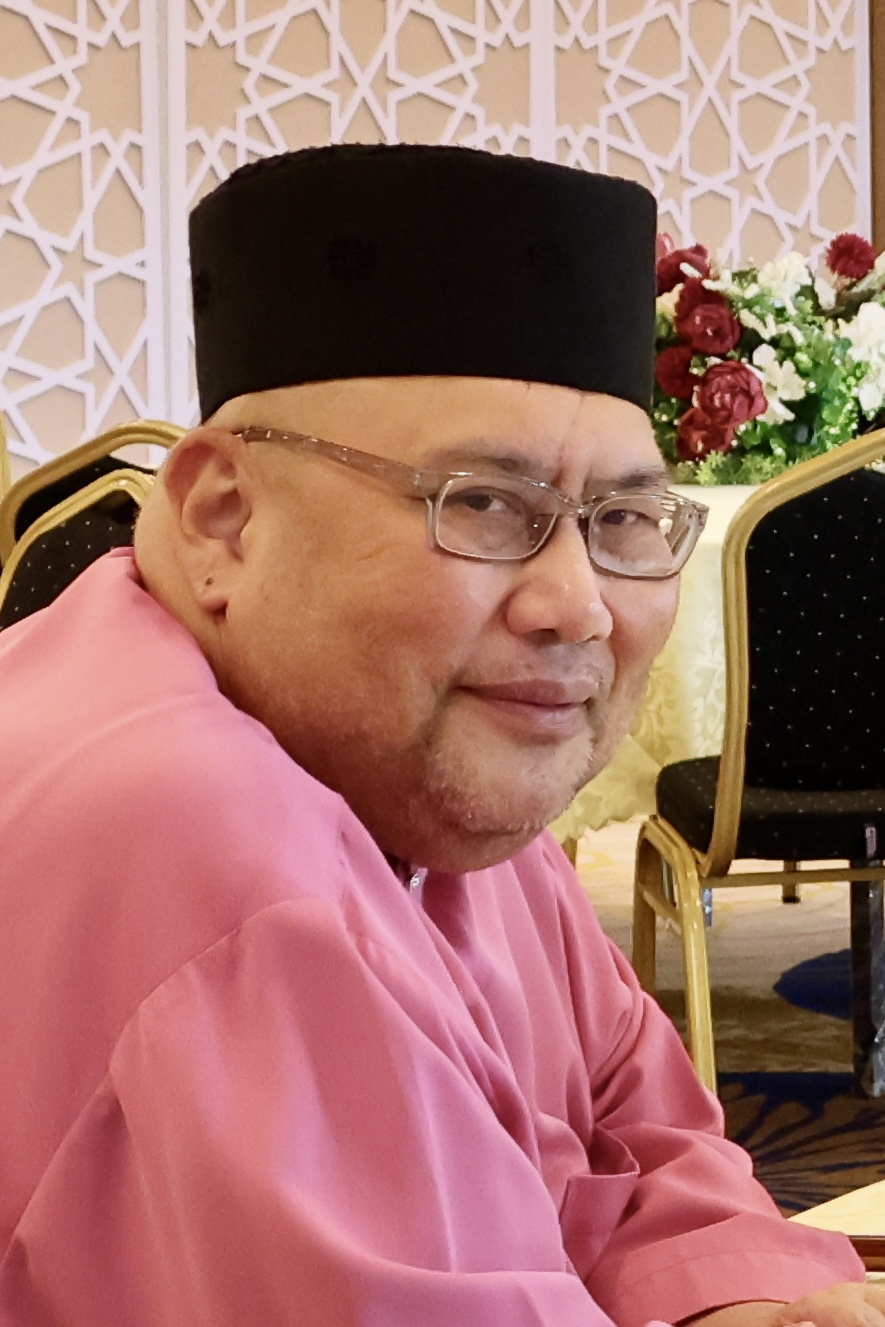
- Rozan in 2024
- Born: 10 July 1963 (age 63); Seria, Belait, Brunei
- Education: University of Keele (BA); Harvard University (MPA); Heriot-Watt University (MBA); Universiti Brunei Darussalam
- Occupations: Civil servant; writer
- Spouse: Nafisah Mohiddin (m. 1958)
- Relatives: Mohd Riza (brother); Noor Qamar (niece)

Mohd Rozan bin Haji Mohd Yunos (born 10 July 1963), pen name Rozan Yunos, is a retired civil servant who worked for the Brunei government from 1987 until 2017. In addition to serving as permanent secretary in the Prime Minister's Office, the Ministry of Culture, Youth, and Sports, and the Ministry of Development, he has held a number of other positions. As of 2023, he is an adjunct professor at the Universiti Brunei Darussalam's Centre for Lifelong Learning.

== Early life and education ==
Rozan graduated from Keele University with a degree in law and economics in 1987. Harvard University awarded him a master's degree in public administration in 1997. Heriot-Watt University awarded him a second master's degree in business administration in 2002. He attended the Executive Development Program at Universiti Brunei Darussalam in 2005. Additionally, he acquired fellowship for public policy and management at John F Kennedy School and Chartered Management Institute, in 1996 and 1999 respectively. He was awarded a Doctorate of Philosophy degree in Islamic Governance by Universiti Brunei Darussalam in 2023.

== Career ==
Rozan began his civil career as an administrative officer grade 1 with the Establishment Department in 1987; later transferred to the Ministry of Communications in 1987; corporate planning manager with the Telecommunications Department in 1991; administrative officer special grade with the Public Service Department in 1992; assistant managing director with the Employees Trust Fund Board in 1993; senior administrative officer with the Ministry of Finance in 1997; senior administrative officer with the Economic Council (Ministry of Foreign Affairs) in 2000; senior administrative officer with the Economic Planning and Development Department in 2001; senior administrative officer for the Prime Minister's Office in 2001; managing director with the Employees Trust Fund Board in 2004; deputy permanent secretary for the Ministry of Finance in 2005; permanent secretary for the Ministry of Development in 2008; permanent secretary for the Ministry of Culture, Youth and Sports in 2011; permanent secretary for the Prime Minister's Office in 2014; senior special duties officer for the Civil Service Department in 2015; and lastly the executive director at the Centre for Strategic and Policy Studies in 2016. He would retire from civil service in July 2017.

== Later life ==
Rozan was a contributor to the documentation of Bruneian history and customs. He wrote for the "Golden Legacy" section of The Brunei Times newspaper, focusing on Brunei's past. In addition to his newspaper contributions, Rozan presented papers at various international, regional, and national forums. Taking note of the oral traditions conveyed by older generations, Rozan documented these accounts in blogs during the 1990s. Rozan later established the website bruneiresources.com, which served as a platform for his articles and other collected information. His research was often based on a collection of Brunei-related literature. He also included works from other academics who provided him with digital copies of their research.

As of 2023, Rozan works as an adjunct professor at the Universiti Brunei Darussalam's (UBD) Centre for Lifelong Learning (C3L). He also lectures at the Institute of Policy Studies and the Academy of Brunei Studies. After 30 years in the Bruneian government, where he held several positions including Permanent Secretary at the Prime Minister's Office, he joined C3L in 2017.

== Personal life ==
Rozan was born on 10 July 1963 at the town of Seria, Belait District. (Note: According to Rozan, his mother named him after Tan Sri Rozhan Kuntom (1932–2014), former director-general of Public Service Department (PSD).) He is son of a diplomat, Dato Paduka Haji Mohd Yunos bin Haji Md Hussein, and a Malaysian-born educator, Datin Hajah Faridah binti Abdullah. He is the older brother Mohd Riza, a civil servant. Rozan was married to Hajah Nafisah binti Haji Mohiddin (1958–2022) and they have one son, Muhammad Nafis. His wife died due to lung cancer according to Rozan in an Instagram post. In a 2018 interview, it was stated that he enjoys watching Netflix on his break.

== Works ==
- The Golden Warisan Brunei Darussalam. Vol. 1. Haji Mohd. Rozan bin Dato Paduka Haji Mohd. Yunos. 2009. pp. Brunei. ISBN 9789991709635.
- Our Brunei Heritage. Brunei: Haji Mohd. Rozan bin Dato Paduka Haji Mohd. Yunos. 2011. ISBN 9789991754543.
- ASEAN Wonders. Brunei: Haji Mohd. Rozan bin Dato Paduka Haji Mohd. Yunos. 2013. ISBN 9789991736013.
- The Golden Warisan Brunei Darussalam. Vol. 2. Dewan Bahasa dan Pustaka Brunei, Kementerian Kebudayaan, Belia dan Sukan. 2013. pp. Brunei. ISBN 9789991709635.
- Monsters, Dragons, and Fairies. Brunei: Haji Mohd. Rozan bin Dato Paduka Haji Mohd. Yunos. 2017. ISBN 9789991796147.
- The Golden Islamic Heritage of Brunei Darussalam. Brunei: UNISSA Press. 2017. ISBN 9789991782645.
- From Kianggeh to Weston from Italy to America. Brunei: Haji Mohd. Rozan bin Dato Paduka Haji Mohd. Yunos. 2017. ISBN 9789991796154.
- Brunei the Origins. Brunei: Rozan Yunos. 2019. ISBN 9789991799230.
- Bruneiʼs Culture in a Betelnut Shell. Qasrun Nafis Publishing House. 2020. ISBN 9789991799865.
- Sultan Haji Hassanal Bolkiah. Brunei: Qasrun Nafis Publishing House. 2020. ISBN 9789991799292.
- Teranah Di Rumah. Qasrun Nafis Publishing House. 2021. ISBN 9789991789941.
- Broken Dreams. Brunei: Qasrun Nafis Publishing House. 2021. ISBN 9789991789910.

== Honours ==
During his period of service with the Government of Brunei, he has been bestowed the following honours;

- Order of Setia Negara Brunei Third Class (SNB; 15 July 2010)
- Order of Setia Negara Brunei Fourth Class (PSB)
- Sultan of Brunei Silver Jubilee Medal (5 October 1992)
- National Day Silver Jubilee Medal (23 February 2009)
- Meritorius Service Medal (PJK)
- Excellent Service Medal (PIKB)
- Long Service Medal (PKL)
