= Riza Yunos =

Bruneian politician and civil servant

Dato Seri Setia Riza Yunos PSNB SPMB
- رضى يونس
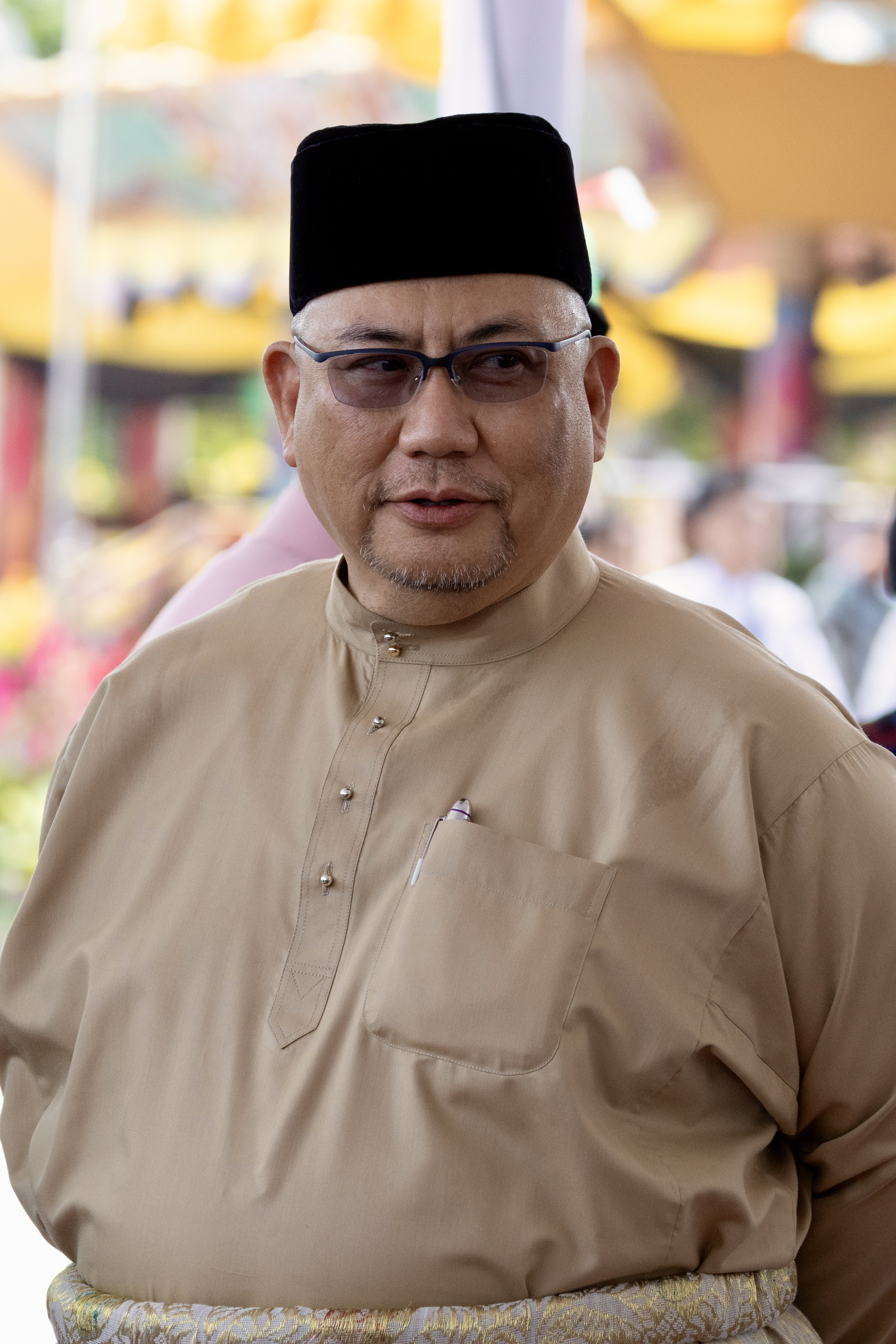
- Dato Riza in 2024

Deputy Minister at the Prime Minister's Office
- Incumbent
- Assumed office 7 June 2022 Serving with Sufian Sabtu
- Monarch: Hassanal Bolkiah
- Minister: Isa Ibrahim; Amin Liew Abdullah; Halbi Mohammad Yussof
- Preceded by: Elinda C.A. Mohammad

Personal details
- Born: May 1967 (age 59) Brunei
- Relatives: Mohd Rozan (brother); Noor Qamar (niece)
- Education: Brighton Polytechnic (BEng); University of Nottingham (MSc); Universiti Brunei Darussalam (MBA)
- Occupation: Politician; civil servant

Mohd Riza bin Haji Mohd Yunos (born May 1967) is a politician and civil servant from Brunei who is the incumbent Deputy Minister at the Prime Minister's Office (PMO) since 2022. Additionally, he is also the deputy chairman of Royal Brunei Airlines (RBA), and among the directors of Darussalam Assets.

== Education and early career ==
In 1989, Mohd Riza completed his Bachelor of Engineering (Hons) in Electronic Engineering from Brighton Polytechnic, United Kingdom. Following that, he earned his Master of Science in Modern Electronics from University of Nottingham in 1990. Later, in 2005, he obtained his Master of Business Administration from the Universiti Brunei Darussalam.

== Early career ==
Mohd Riza started off with Brunei Administrative Services (BAS) as the Director of the Land Transport Department. In 1990, he began working as a telecommunications engineer.

From May 2020 to June 2022, Mohd Riza held the position of permanent secretary overseeing Civil Service, Welfare, International Affairs, and Media. Prior to that role, he served as permanent secretary in charge of Media and Cabinet affairs at the PMO from August 2016 to April 2020. Preceding this, he was the deputy permanent secretary responsible for Corporate and Governance matters at the PMO from November 2015 to August 2016. His career also includes a stint as deputy permanent secretary at the Ministry of Communication from June 2014 to November 2015, and as deputy permanent secretary focusing on Entrepreneurship and Industry Development at the Ministry of Industry and Primary Resources from September 2010 to June 2014.

On 22 September 2016, Mohd Riza, at the request of Muhammad Faishal Ibrahim, headed a group of government representatives, media representatives, and students to Singapore, where they were received by the Ministry of Communications and Information.

== Ministerial career ==
As part of the new cabinet reshuffle on 7 June 2022, Mohd Riza was named Deputy Minister at the PMO. On 5 August 2022, Prince Al-Muhtadee Billah, along by other state officials, including Mohammed Riza, was welcomed by Senior Minister of State for Defence Zaqy Mohamad to a visit to Changi Naval Base.

== Personal life ==
Born in May 1967, to Dato Paduka Mohammed Yunos. He is son of a diplomat, Dato Paduka Haji Mohd Yunos bin Haji Md Hussein, and a Malaysian-born educator, Datin Hajah Faridah binti Abdullah. He also has an older brother, Mohd Rozan, a retired civil servant and author.

== Honours ==
He has earned the following honours:

- Order of Setia Negara Brunei First Class (PSNB; 15 July 2026) – Dato Seri Setia
- Order of Seri Paduka Mahkota Brunei First Class (SPMB; 15 July 2022) – Dato Seri Paduka
