= Sufian Sabtu =

Bruneian politician and civil servant

Dato Seri Setia Sufian Sabtu PSNB SPMB DPMB PSB PJK PIKB
- سفيان سبتو
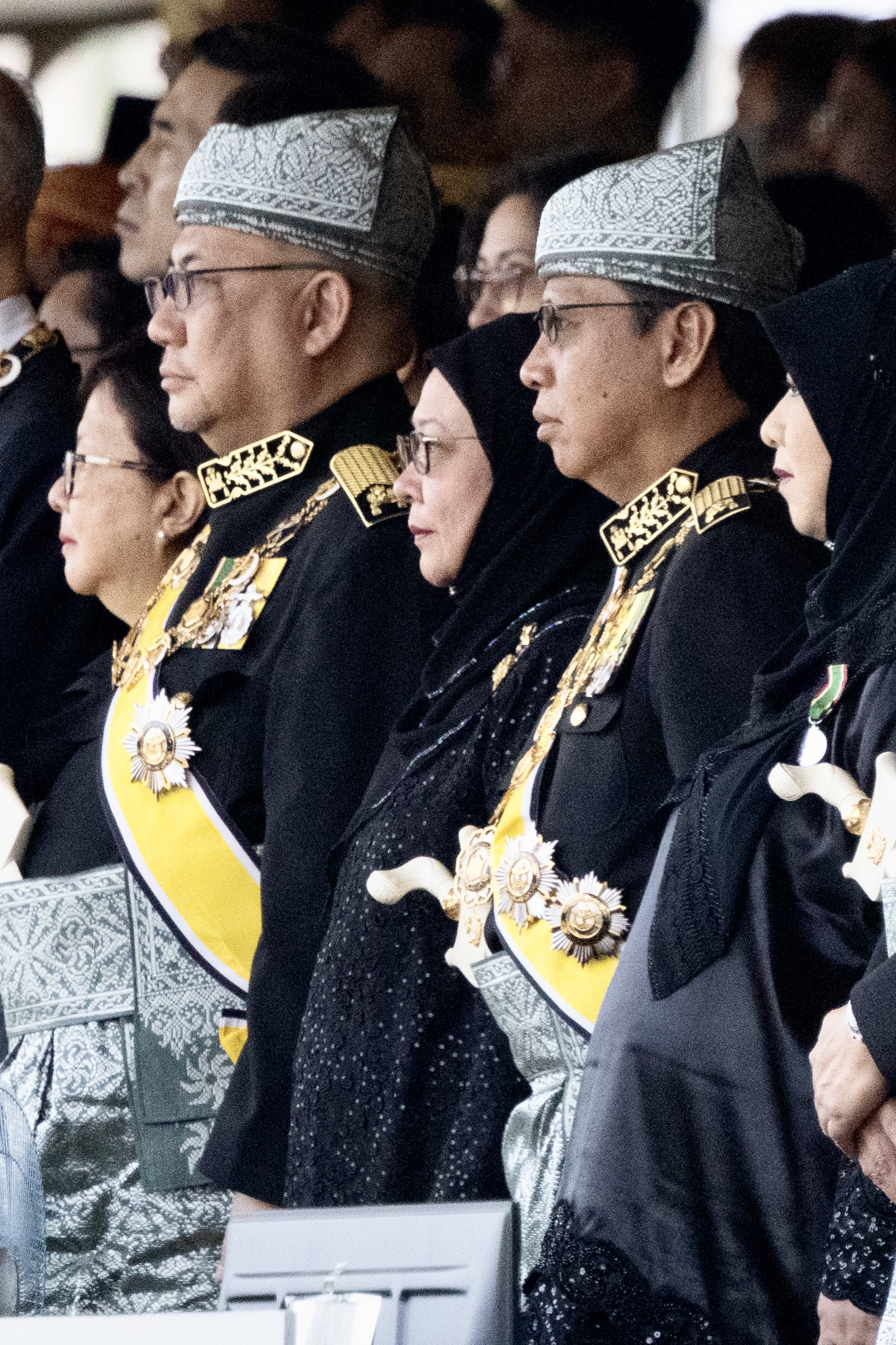
- Riza Yunos and Sufian in 2024

Deputy Minister at the Prime Minister's Office
- Incumbent
- Assumed office 7 June 2022 Serving with Riza Yunos
- Monarch: Hassanal Bolkiah
- Minister: Isa Ibrahim; Amin Liew Abdullah; Halbi Mohammad Yussof
- Preceded by: Elinda C.A. Mohammad

Personal details
- Born: Brunei
- Spouse: Suriati Abang
- Education: Universiti Brunei Darussalam; Keele University; Lee Kuan Yew School of Public Policy
- Occupation: Politician; civil servant

Sufian bin Haji Sabtu is a politician and civil servant from Brunei who is the incumbent Deputy Minister at the Prime Minister's Office (PMO) since 2022, and the director Internal Security Department (ISD) since 2020. Additionally, he is also the chairman of Safety, Health and Environment National Authority (SHENA).

== Education and early career ==
Sufian completed his undergraduate education at the Universiti Brunei Darussalam before going on to the University of Keele in the United Kingdom for his postgraduate studies. He also took part in the National University of Singapore's Lee Kuan Yew School of Public Policy's Executive Development Programme for Senior Government Officers (EDPSGO).

In 1994, Sufian began working for the ISD as a staff officer. Before being moved and given a promotion to become the deputy director of the Anti-Corruption Bureau (ACB) in 2017, he held a variety of important positions at the ISD, including that of deputy director of operations. He was elevated to director of ISD on 25 July 2020. Subsequently, on 31 July 2021, he was named permanent secretary (Security, Enforcement and Law) in the PMO, in addition to his role as Director of ISD.

Through the United Nations Office on Drugs and Crime (UNODC), Sufian received facial recognition hardware and software on 14 March 2022, from Japan's Ambassador Meada.

== Ministerial career ==
During a cabinet reshuffle on 7 June 2022, Sufian was named Deputy Minister in the PMO by order of Sultan Hassanal Bolkiah. In addition, he is concurrently appointed director of ISD. On 16 March 2023, at the 4th Sub-Regional Meeting on Counter Terrorism and Transnational Security (SRM) in Melbourne, he led the delegation from Brunei during the conference. During the 11th International Meeting of High-Ranking Officials Responsible for peace Matters in Russia on 23 May, Sufian stated that Brunei would keep highlighting the significance of ASEAN centrality in maintaining the peace and stability of this region.

During the 8th ASEAN Ministerial Meeting on Drug Matters (AMMD) in Vientiane in August 2023, Sufian, who was representing Brunei, underlined the Sultanate's commitment to supporting regional and international efforts aimed at addressing the challenges posed by drug misuse and smuggling. He declared the Royal Brunei Police Force (RBPF) Code of Ethics and Conduct to be in effect at a passing-out parade for trainee male police constables and probationary inspector cadet officers. In October 2023, he underlined the value of credibility and discipline among the force's employees. He called on senior government officials to participate in the 30th EDPSGO later in September in order to benefit from it.

== Personal life ==
Sufian and his wife, Datin Suriati binti Haji Abang, together have three children.

== Honours ==
He has earned the following honours:

- Order of Setia Negara Brunei First Class (PSNB; 15 July 2026) – Dato Seri Setia
- Order of Seri Paduka Mahkota Brunei First Class (SPMB; 15 July 2022) – Dato Seri Paduka
- Order of Seri Paduka Mahkota Brunei Second Class (DPMB; 15 July 2021) – Dato Paduka
- Order of Setia Negara Brunei Fourth Class (PSB)
- Meritorious Service Medal (PJK)
- Excellent Service Medal (PIKB)
