= Dani Ibrahim =

Bruneian politician (born 1949)

Yang Dimuliakan Pehin Orang Kaya Dewa Pahlawan Dato Paduka Dani Ibrahim DPMB SNB PJK PIKB PKL
- داني إبراهيم

3rd Deputy Minister of Home Affairs
- In office 24 May 2005 – 29 May 2010
- Monarch: Hassanal Bolkiah
- Minister: Adanan Yusof
- Preceded by: Badaruddin Othman
- Succeeded by: Halbi Mohammad Yussof

Personal details
- Born: 23 June 1949 (age 77) Brunei
- Spouse: Norhayati Abu Bakar
- Education: Kolej Islam Malaya; National University of Malaysia; University of Hull

Dani bin Haji Ibrahim (born 23 June 1949) is a Bruneian aristocrat and retired politician who was the Deputy Minister of Home Affairs between 2005 and 2010. He was also among the Takaful Bank Pembangunan Islam's Board of Directors.

== Education ==
Dani received his early education at Bendahara Sakam Primary School from 1956 to 1959, and later Sultan Omar Ali Saifuddien College from 1960 to 1962. He attended Madrasah Aljunied Al-Islamiah in Singapore from 1963 to 1967, Kolej Islam Malaya in Malaysia from 1967 to 1970, National University of Malaysia from 1971 to 1973, and University of Hull in the United Kingdom from 1976 to 1979.

== Career ==
Dani began working for the government as an Assistant Development Religious Officer within the Religious Affairs Department from 27 November 1973 to 17 July 1979; Administrative Officer Grade 1 within the Land Department on 17 July 1979; Deputy Controller of State Store and Supplies from 1982 to 1986; Assistant Director of Procurement at the Ministry of Defence from 1986 to 1990; Director of Administration and Manpower at the same ministry from 1990 to 1994; District Officer (DO) of Belait District from 1994 to 1999; DO of Brunei-Muara District from 1999 to 2001; permanent secretary at the Ministry of Culture, Youth and Sports from 2001 to 2003; and permanent secretary at the Prime Minister's Office (PMO) from 2003 to 2005.

On 24 May 2005, Sultan Hassanal Bolkiah announced a significant cabinet reorganisation and named a number of fresh faces to the ministerial lineup. At the Istana Nurul Iman on 1 June, the new cabinet was sworn in. Dani (as the Deputy Minister of Home Affairs) was one of the five new Deputy Ministers to be appointed. At the Dewan Muafakat of the Temburong District Office in Bangar Town, on 7 June 2005, Dani attended a meeting to discuss plans for the Temburong District's commemoration of His Majesty's 59th birthday. As the acting Minister of Home Affairs on 27 December, he rolled out the "Mutual Assistance in Criminal Matters Order, 2005" after seeking approval from the Sultan. His tenure ended in the 2010 Bruneian cabinet reshuffle on 29 May.

== Personal life ==
Dani was born on 23 June 1949. He has 4 sons and 2 daughters with Datin Hajah Norhayati binti Haji Abu Bakar.

Around 3.55 a.m. on 28 July 2010, in Kampong Bengkurong, a group of seven thieves carried out a gang robbery using a lethal weapon, such as a knife or screwdriver, and they took money from Pehin Dato Dani and the others living in his home.

== Titles, styles and honours ==
=== Titles and styles ===
On 17 April 2004, Dani was bestowed the Manteri title of Yang Dimuliakan (The Most Noble) Pehin Orang Kaya Dewa Pahlawan.

=== Honours ===
Dani has earned the following honours:

- Order of Seri Paduka Mahkota Brunei Second Class (DPMB; 15 July 1999) – Dato Paduka
- Order of Setia Negara Brunei Third Class (SNB; 15 July 1993)
- Excellent Service Medal (PIKB; 1984)
- Long Service Medal (PKL; 1994)
- Meritorious Service Medal (PJK; 1993)

Political offices
Preceded by Adanan Yusof	3rd Deputy Minister of Home Affairs; 24 May 2005 – 29 May 2010	Succeeded by Halbi Mohammad Yussof
