= Sidek Ali =

Bruneian diplomat

His Excellency Dato Paduka Sidek Ali DPMB
- صديق علي
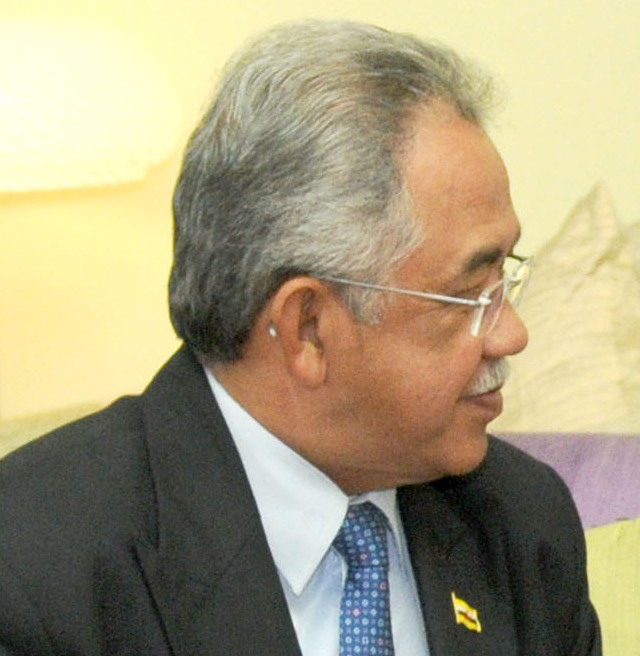
- Sidek in 2015

High Commissioner of Brunei to Singapore
- In office 29 September 2020 – 17 August 2024
- Preceded by: Saifulbahri Mansor
- Succeeded by: Noor Qamar Sulaiman

High Commissioner of Brunei to India
- In office 16 May 2008 – 2020
- Preceded by: Abdul Ghafar Ismail
- Succeeded by: Alaihuddin Taha

Ambassador of Brunei to Laos
- In office 2006–2008
- Succeeded by: Johan Thani Abdullah

Personal details
- Born: Brunei
- Spouse: Mariaratnah Mohd Apong
- Children: 5
- Occupation: Diplomat; civil servant

Sidek bin Ali is a Bruneian diplomat who formerly held the position of ambassador to Laos from 2006 to 2008, high commissioner to India from 2008 to 2020, and Singapore since 2020.

== Diplomatic career ==
In 1979, Sidek started working for the Ministry of Education as an education officer in the Brunei Civil Service. When Brunei gained independence in 1984, the Diplomatic Service Department, which he had joined in 1981, changed its name to the Ministry of Foreign Affairs. From 1997 to 1999, he was stationed in the Bruneian Embassy in Indonesia. Between 2006 and 2008, he served as Brunei's ambassador to Laos. In March 2006, he welcomed Crown Prince Al-Muhtadee Billah and Princess Sarah during their state visit to Laos.

=== India ===
From 2008 until 2020, he served as Bruneian high commissioner to India. During his tenure in India, he served as both the non-resident ambassador of Brunei to Nepal and the non-resident high commissioner of Brunei to Sri Lanka. When Sultan Hassanal Bolkiah and his delegation arrived at Palam Air Force Station on 20 December 2012, he welcomed them. He escorted Datin Romaizah to the 2018 ASIAN Summit on Education & Skills (ASES) in New Delhi. On 28 February 2019, Brunei's representative, Dato Sidek, signed the Agreement for the Exchange of Information and Assistance in Collection with regard to Taxes (TIEA) between India and Brunei. He also participated in the 2019 India ASEAN Expo and Summit on behalf of Brunei.

=== Singapore ===
As the newly appointed high commissioner to Singapore, Dato Sidek had a meeting with Al-Muhtadee Billah on 9 December 2020. On 29 September, he gave President Halimah Yacob his letter of credence during a ceremony held at the Istana. On 24 to 25 August 2022, he hosted Sultan Hassanal Bolkiah and Queen Saleha during their state visit to Singapore. On 18 July 2023, the Supreme Courts of Singapore and Brunei Darussalam signed a memorandum of understanding (MoU) to improve cooperation, communication, and coordination on matters pertaining to the avoidance and settlement of disputes. He was succeeded by Noor Qamar Sulaiman on 17 August 2024.

== Personal life ==
Datin Mariaratnah binti Haji Mohd Apong and Sidek are married, and together they have five children.

== Honours ==
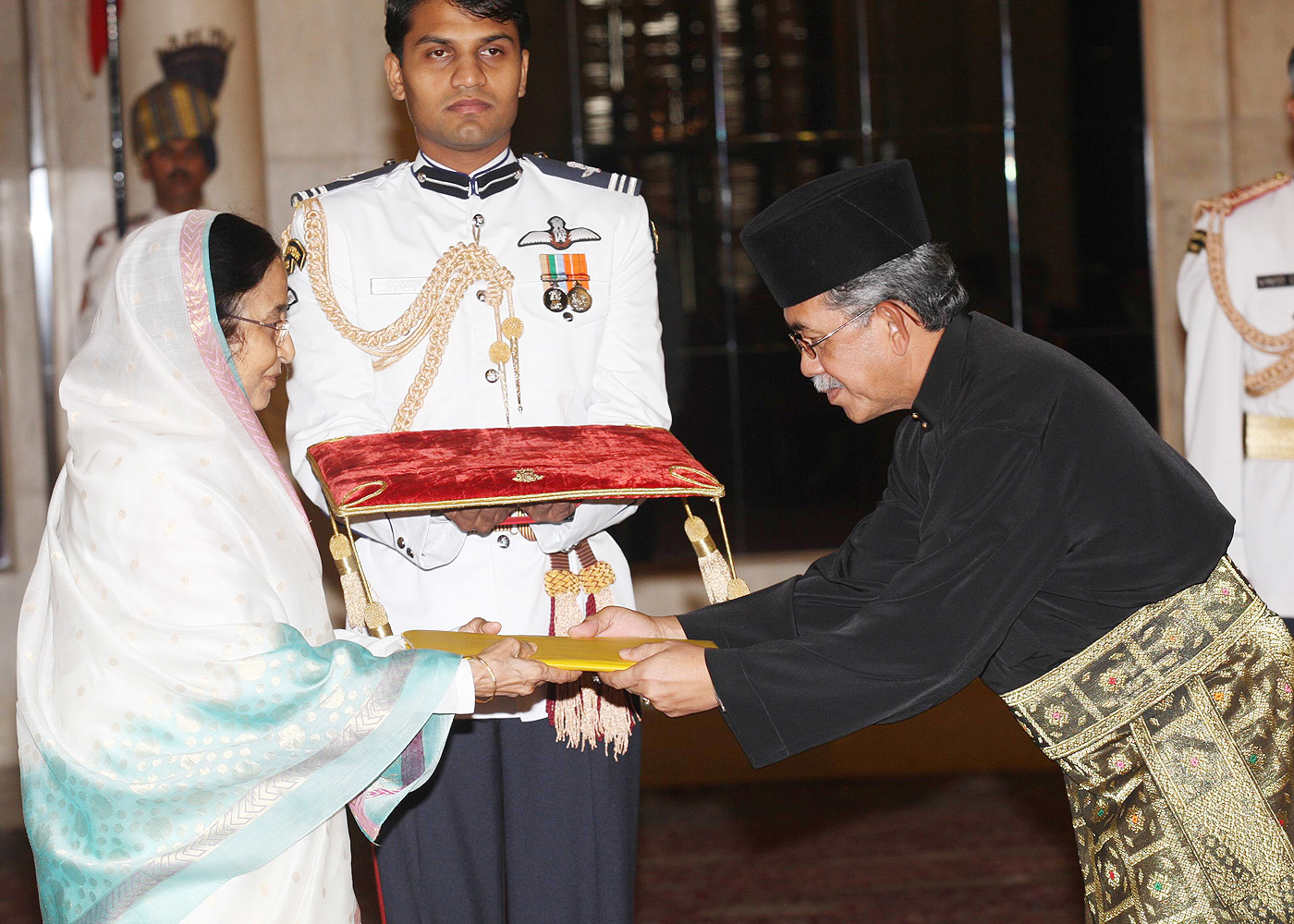
Sidek presenting his letters of credence to President Pratibha Patil in 2008

Sidek has earned the following honours;

National

- Order of Seri Paduka Mahkota Brunei Second Class (DPMB; 15 July 2010) – Dato Paduka
- Order of Seri Paduka Mahkota Brunei Third Class (SMB)
- Excellent Service Medal (PIKB)
- Long Service Medal (PKL)

Foreign

- Laos:
  - Friendship Medal Award

Diplomatic posts
Preceded by Saifulbahri Mansor	High Commissioner of Brunei to Singapore; 29 September 2020 – 17 August 2024	Succeeded by Noor Qamar Sulaiman
Preceded by Abdul Ghafar Ismail	High Commissioner of Brunei to India; 16 May 2008 – 2020	Succeeded by Alaihuddin Taha
Preceded by –	Ambassador of Brunei to Laos; 2006–2008	Succeeded by Johan Thani Abdullah
