= Abdul Ghafar Ismail =

Bruneian diplomat (born 1951)

Dato Paduka Abdul Ghafar Ismail DPMB
- عبد الغفار إسماعيل
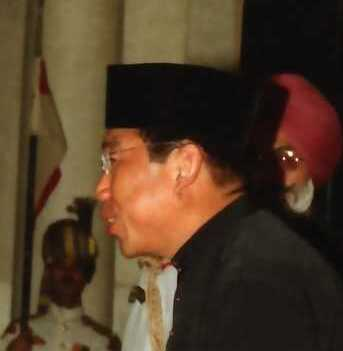
- Abdul Ghafar in 2001

Permanent Representative of Brunei to the United Nations
- In office 28 March 2013 – 2019
- Preceded by: Latif Tuah
- Succeeded by: Noor Qamar Sulaiman

High Commissioner of Brunei to Singapore
- In office 29 November 2007 – 2012
- Preceded by: Yusof Kula
- Succeeded by: Saifulbahri Mansor

High Commissioner of Brunei to India
- In office August 2001 – May 2007
- Preceded by: Abdul Mokti Daud
- Succeeded by: Sidek Ali

Personal details
- Born: 1 October 1952 (age 74) Kampong Danau, Tutong, Brunei
- Spouse: Aishah Husain
- Children: 3
- Education: Fletcher School of Law and Diplomacy (MA); University of Staffordshire (BA)
- Occupation: Diplomat; civil servant

Abdul Ghafar bin Haji Ismail (born 1 October 1952) is a retired Bruneian diplomat who formerly held the position of high commissioner to India from 2001 to 2007, Singapore from 2007 to 2012, and permanent representative of Brunei to the United Nations in New York from 2013 to 2019.

== Education ==
Abdul Ghafar graduated from the University of Staffordshire in the United Kingdom with a Bachelor of Arts (Hons) in geography from 1972 to 1975, and continued his PGCE studies at Reading University from 1981 to 1982. In 1985, he embarked on the Foreign Service & Diplomatic Course at the Australian National University and Ministry of Foreign Affairs and Trade, Australia. From Tufts University's Fletcher School of Law and Diplomacy in the United States with a Master of Arts (MA) in international law and diplomacy. In 1994, he studied at Maastricht, Netherlands's European Institute of Public Administration (EIPA).

== Diplomatic career ==
From 1978, Abdul Ghafar began his career in the Brunei Darussalam Government Service. After being posted abroad for the first time in 1984, to Bangkok, he worked as assistant director of economics from 1988 to 1989 and as second secretary from 1985 to 1987 after joining the ministry. From 1989 until 1991, he served as a first secretary in the Bruneian embassy in Riyadh. Between 1991 and 1995, he held the same position of responsibility for the ASEAN. From 1992 to 1995, he was appointed as the deputy director of Protocol and Consular Affairs.

From 1995 until 1998, Abdul Ghafar was Brunei's deputy grand chamberlain. He served as the Ministry of Foreign Affairs and Trade's (MOFAT) Director of Multilateral Economics from 1988 to 1999 and Director of Politics II from 1999 to 2001. He served as the Bruneian high commissioner to India from August 2001 to May 2007, while also holding accreditations in Nepal and Sri Lanka.

After being appointed as Brunei's high commissioner-designate to Singapore in August 2007, Abdul Ghafar took office as Brunei's high commissioner to Singapore on 29 November 2007, in addition to his dual roles as non-resident high commissioner to South Africa and the Maldives. During his tenure, he saw Prince Al-Muhtadee Billah's official state visit to the country in January 2012.

On 26 February 2013, Sultan Hassanal Bolkiah presented Abdul Gafar his letters of credence, as the newly appointed permanent representative of Brunei to the United Nations in New York. He was present when Sultan Hassanal Bolkiah and Queen Saleha attended the 70th Session of the UN General Assembly on 29 September 2015. With the signing of a joint declaration by representatives from Abdul Gafar and the Bahamas, Elliston Rahming, Brunei formally established diplomatic ties on 21 November 2016.

== Personal life ==
Abdul Ghafar is married to Datin Aishah Husain, together they have three children. He was born on 1 October 1952, in Kampong Danau, Tutong, Brunei. His hobbies included reading, jogging, golf and badminton.

== Honours ==
Abdul Ghafar has earned the following honours;

National

- Order of Seri Paduka Mahkota Brunei Second Class (DPMB; 15 July 2010) – Dato Paduka
- Order of Seri Paduka Mahkota Brunei Third Class (SMB; 1993)
- Meritorious Service Medal (PJK; 2000)
- Excellent Service Medal (PIKB; 1989)
- Long Service Medal (PKL; 2005)
- Sultan of Brunei Silver Jubilee Medal (5 October 1992)
- Proclamation of Independence Medal (1997)

Foreign

- France:
  - Commandeur of the Legion of Honour (1997)

Diplomatic posts
Preceded by Latif Tuah	Permanent Representative of Brunei to the United Nations; 28 March 2013 – 2019	Succeeded by Noor Qamar Sulaiman
Preceded by Yusof Kula	High Commissioner of Brunei to Singapore; August 2001 – 2012	Succeeded by Saifulbahri Mansor
Preceded by Abdul Mokti Daud	High Commissioner of Brunei to India; September 1994 – May 2007	Succeeded by Sidek Ali
