= List of ambassadors of Brunei to Russia =

Ambassador of Brunei to Russia
- Послы Брунея в России
- Emblem of Brunei
- Incumbent; Mahadi Wasli since 17 November 2022
- Style: His Excellency
- Residence: Moscow
- Appointer: Sultan of Brunei
- Term length: At His Majesty's pleasure
- Inaugural holder: Janin Erih
- Formation: 22 December 2004
- Website: Official website

The Bruneian ambassador in Moscow is the official representative of the Government in Bandar Seri Begawan to the Government of Russia.

== Background ==
On 1 October 1991, the USSR and Brunei established diplomatic ties. Since September 1996, Pengiran Maidin Hashim has held the position of non-resident ambassador to Russia. Mahadi Maidin served as advisor-envoy in Moscow from 1999 to 2002. In 2004, Russia received its first ambassador of Brunei. Since February 2010, Brunei has been home to the Embassy of the Russian Federation.

== List of ambassadors ==
Diplomatic agrément/Diplomatic accreditation	Ambassador	Observations	Prime Minister of Brunei	President of Russia	Term end
27 August 2001	Dato Paduka Haji Mahadi bin Haji Wasli		Hassanal Bolkiah	Vladimir Putin	2003
22 December 2004	Dato Paduka Mohd Janin bin Erih	The Sultan came to Russia at President Putin's invitation for a four-day formal visit.	Hassanal Bolkiah	Vladimir Putin	2007
29 May 2009	Emran bin Bahar		Hassanal Bolkiah	Dmitry Medvedev	2012
2012	Dato Paduka Haji Haini bin Haji Hashim	The Sultan was in Russia to attend the Asia-Pacific Economic Cooperation (APEC) Forum 2012, which will be held in Vladivostok. The Sultan landed in Saint Petersburg to attend the G20 Leaders' Summit, which took place from 5 to 6 September 2013.	Hassanal Bolkiah	Dmitry Medvedev	2022
6 April 2023	Pengiran Muhammad Husaini bin Pengiran Penggawa Laila Bentara Istiadat Diraja Dalam Istana Pengiran Haji Alauddin		Hassanal Bolkiah	Vladimir Putin	incumbent

== Gallery ==
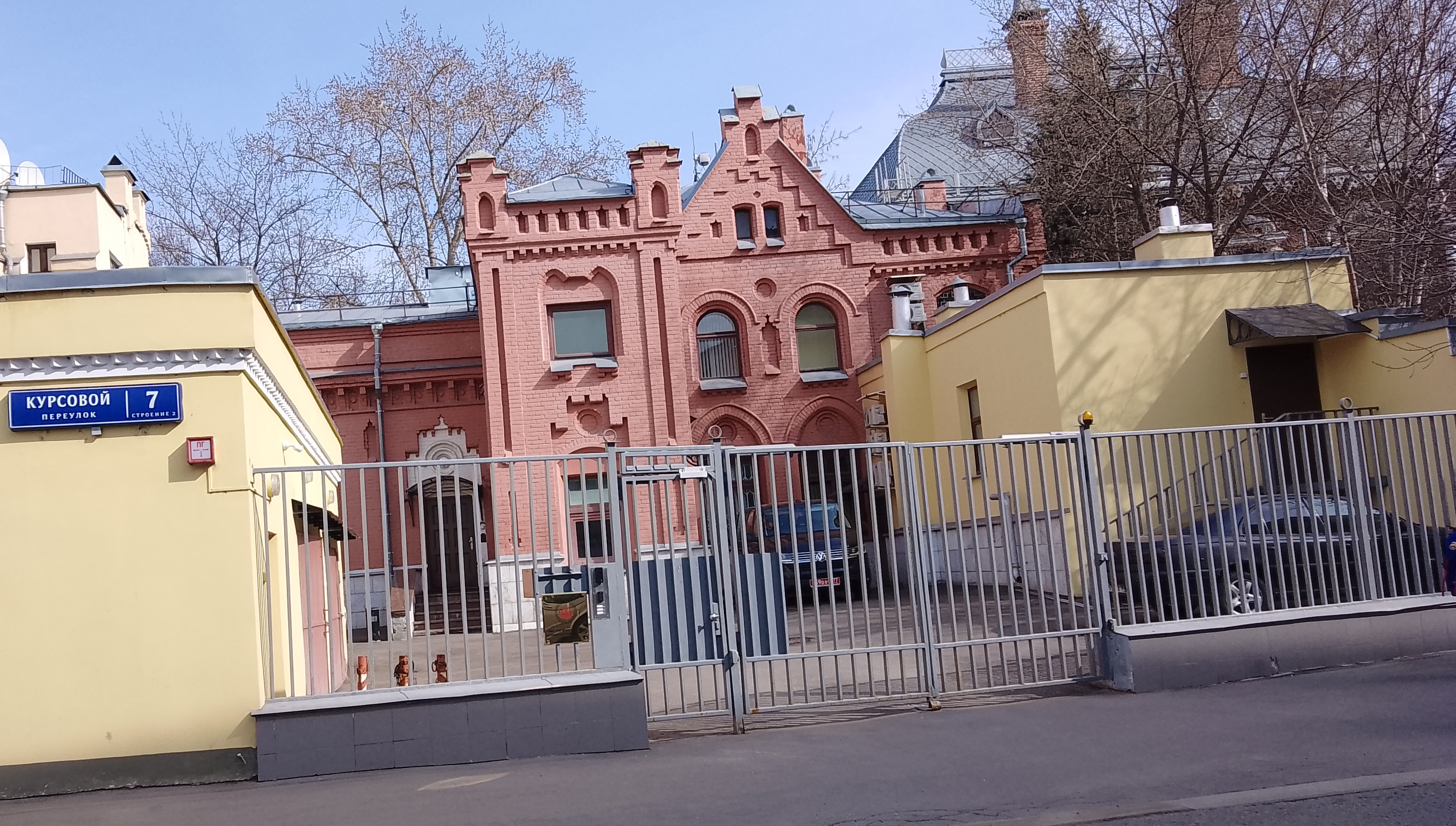
The Brunei Embassy's main gate

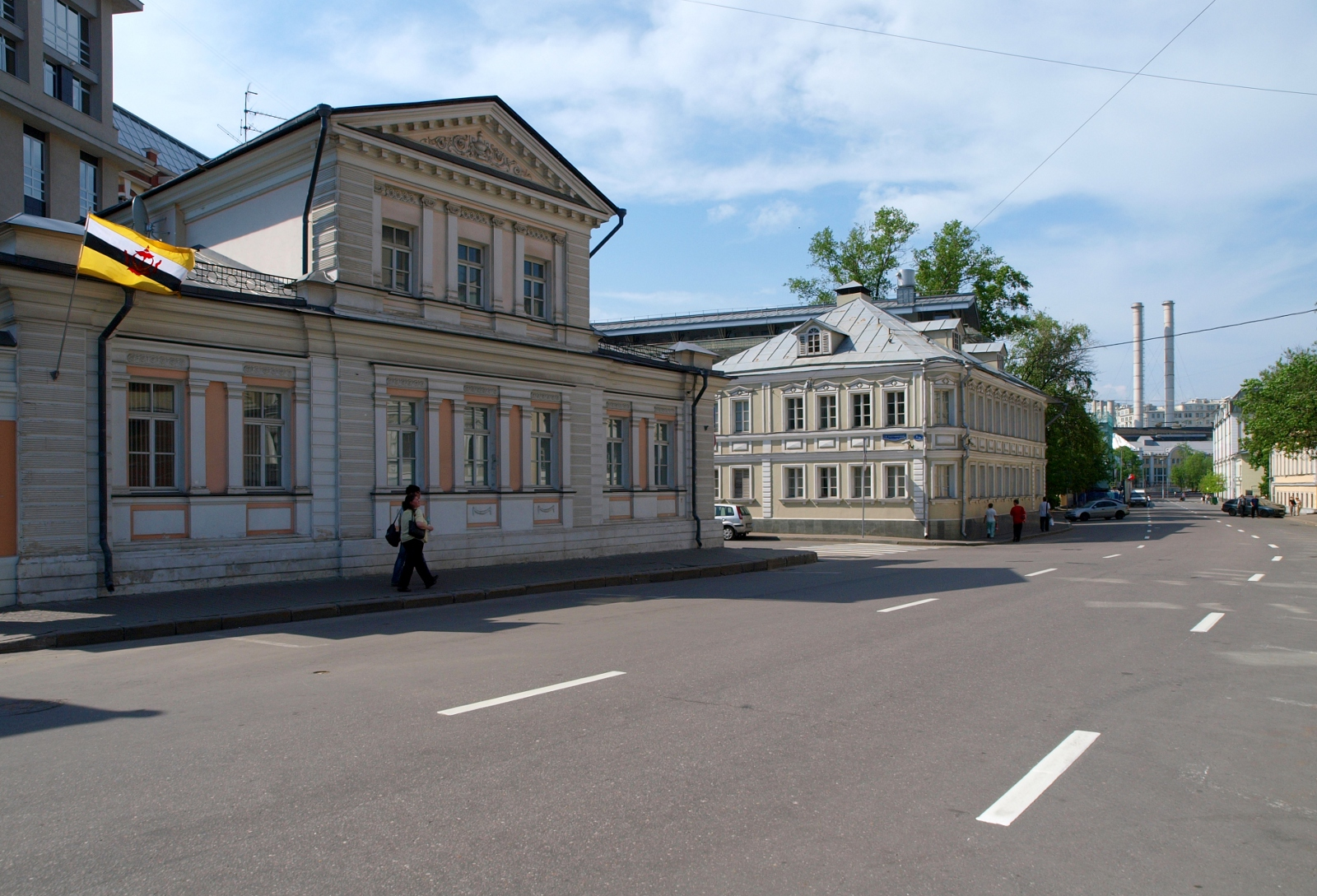
The old building of the Brunei Embassy on Bolshaya Yakimanka Street

== See also ==
- Foreign relations of Brunei
- Brunei–Russia relations
