= Mahadi Wasli =

Bruneian diplomat

Dato Paduka Mahadi Wasli DPMB
- مهاد وسلي

Ambassador of Brunei to Vietnam
- In office 20 July 2007 – 29 August 2013
- Preceded by: Mahdi Abdul Rahman
- Succeeded by: Sahari Salleh

Permanent Representative of Brunei to the United Nations in Geneva
- In office 28 August 2003 – July 2007
- Preceded by: Hamid Jaafar
- Succeeded by: Alaihuddin Taha

Ambassador of Brunei to Russia
- In office 27 August 2001 – 2003
- Succeeded by: Janin Erih

Ambassador of Brunei to Germany
- In office 1997–2001
- Preceded by: Pengiran Maidin
- Succeeded by: Adnan Buntar

Personal details
- Born: Brunei
- Education: MARA Institute of Technology
- Occupation: Diplomat

Mahadi bin Haji Wasli is a Brunei diplomat who became the Deputy Secretary-General of ASEAN from 1994 to 1997, ambassador to Russia from 2001 to 2003, Vietnam from 2007 to 2013, and the permanent representative to the United Nations (UN) in Geneva from 2003 to 2007. Notably, he also held non-resident ambassadorship to Ukraine from 2004 to 2007, and Switzerland.

== Diplomatic career ==
From 1994 to 1997, Mahadi held the position of Deputy Secretary-General of the Association of Southeast Asian Nations (ASEAN). Following this, from 1997 to 2001, he served as the ambassador of Brunei to Germany, with a residence in Bonn and later in Berlin. From 1999 to 2001, he concurrently served as the permanent representative of Brunei to the United Nations in Geneva, and holding the title of non-resident ambassador to Switzerland. He served as the Brunei ambassador to the Russian Federation from 2001 to 2007. Additionally, from 2004 to 2007, he served as the non-resident ambassador of Brunei to Ukraine, playing a crucial role in facilitating the visit of Sultan Hassanal Bolkiah to Ukraine in 2004.

From 10 July 2007 to 29 August 2013, he extended his diplomatic service as the Brunei ambassador to Vietnam. On 8 August 2010, he presented his letter of credential to President Nguyễn Minh Triết. Together with Mustappa Sirat, they attended the first ASEAN Defence Minister's Meeting – Plus (ADMM+) on 12 October 2010 in Hanoi. Later on 10 December 2020, General Ngô Xuân Lịch gave him the chairmanship of the ADMM and ADMM+.

== Honours ==
He has earned the following honours;

- Order of Seri Paduka Mahkota Brunei Second Class (DPMB; 15 July 2000) – Dato Paduka

Diplomatic posts
Preceded by Mahdi Abdul Rahman	Ambassador of Brunei to Vietnam; 20 July 2007 – 29 August 2013	Succeeded by Sahari Salleh
Preceded by Hamid Jaafar	Permanent Representative of Brunei to the United Nations in Geneva; 28 August 2003 – July 2007	Succeeded by Alaihuddin Taha
Preceded by –	Ambassador of Brunei to Russia; 27 August 2001 – 2003	Succeeded by Janin Erih
Preceded by Pengiran Maidin	Ambassador of Brunei to Germany; 1997–2001	Succeeded by Adnan Buntar
