= Noor Qamar Sulaiman =

Bruneian civil servant and diplomat

Her Excellency Noor Qamar Sulaiman SNB
- نور قمر سليمان
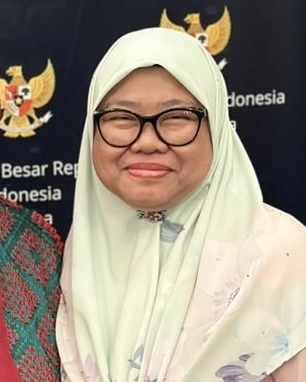
- Noor Qamar in 2023

High Commissioner of Brunei to Singapore
- Incumbent
- Assumed office 17 August 2024
- Preceded by: Sidek Ali

Permanent Representative of Brunei to the United Nations
- In office 18 February 2019 – 17 August 2024
- Preceded by: Abdul Ghafar Ismail
- Succeeded by: Vacant

High Commissioner of Brunei to New Zealand
- In office 1992–1994

Personal details
- Born: Brunei
- Relations: Mohd Rozan (uncle); Mohd Riza (uncle)
- Education: Universiti Brunei Darussalam
- Occupation: Civil servant; diplomat

Noor Qamar binti Haji Sulaiman is a Bruneian civil servant and diplomat who is currently the high commissioner of Brunei to the Republic of Singapore since 2024. She was Bruneian permanent representative to the United Nations (UN) in New York from 2019 to 2024, and high commissioner to New Zealand from 1992 to 1994.

== Education ==
Noor Qamar graduated from Universiti Brunei Darussalam (UBD) with a bachelor's degree in public administration and policy.

== Diplomatic career ==
Noor Qamar was previously employed with the Ministry of Foreign Affairs' Office of Princess Masna, Ambassador-at-Large. Between March 2006 to the time of her most recent assignment, she held a number of positions, her most recent one being senior special duties officer. She was first secretary from January 2002 till she was appointed special duties officer in March 2004–March 2006. She started working in the Foreign Ministry's International Department in December 1999 as the assistant director of protocol and consular before being appointed to that position.

One of Noor Qamar's previous overseas assignments was serving as second secretary at the Permanent Mission in New York from 1994 to 1998. From 1992 to 1994, she served in the same position as a non-resident at her nation's High Commission in New Zealand.

On 16 January 2019, Prince Al-Muhtadee Billah hosted newly appointed foreign and Bruneian envoys. Among the former were Noor Qamar, the permanent representative of Brunei Darussalam to the United Nations in New York. UN Secretary-General António Guterres received Noor Qamar's credentials, Brunei Darussalam's new Permanent Representative to the UN on 18 February.

On 9 December 2020, Brunei and the Government of Rwanda established diplomatic ties, with Noor Qamar represented the government of Brunei, and Valentine Rugwabiza represented Rwanda. On 12 May 2021, Noor Qamar gave her copy of her credentials as their respective nations' designated ambassadors to the Government of Cuba to Anayansi Rodríguez Camejo, the Deputy Minister of Foreign Affairs of Cuba.

Letters of credence were given by the Sultan to Noor Qamar, Brunei's recently appointed high commissioner to Singapore, at Istana Nurul Iman on 17 August 2024.

== Honours ==
Throughout her career, she has received the following honours;

- Order of Setia Negara Brunei Third Class (SNB; 15 July 2017)

Political offices
| Preceded by Sidek Ali | High Commissioner of Brunei to Singapore; 17 August 2024 – present | Succeeded by Incumbent |
| Preceded by Abdul Ghafar Ismail | Permanent Representative of Brunei to the United Nations; 18 February 2019 – 17 August 2024 | Succeeded by Vacant |
