= Shofry Abdul Ghafor =

Bruneian diplomat and artist (born 1958)

Dato Paduka Shofry Abdul Ghafor DPMB
- شوفري عبدالغافور
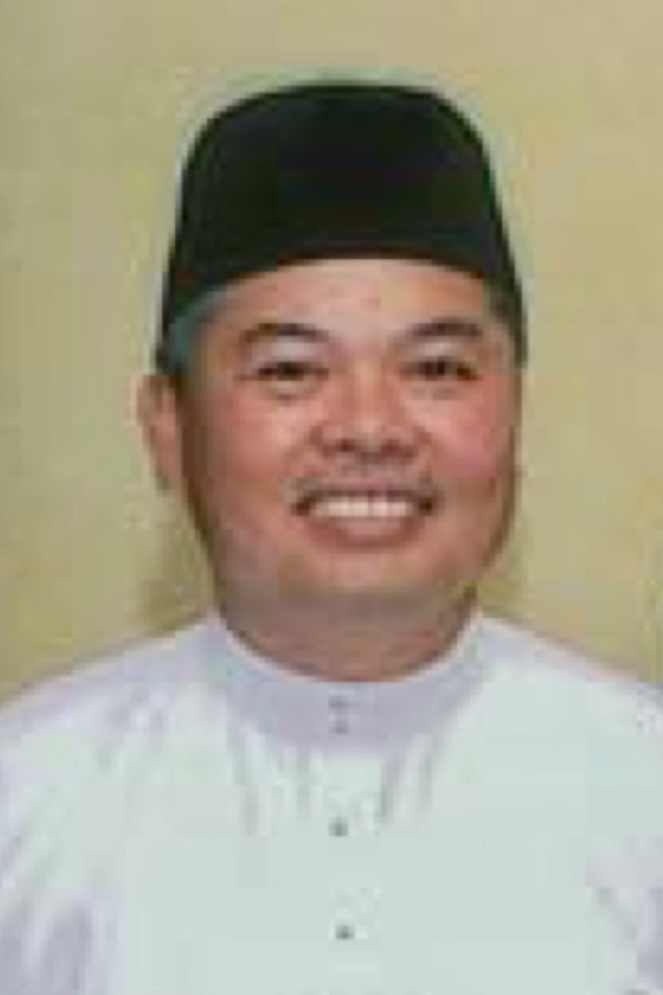
- Dato Shofry in 2004

Permanent Representative of Brunei to the United Nations
- In office 1 October 2002 – 9 July 2005
- Preceded by: Serbini Ali
- Succeeded by: Emran Bahar

Personal details
- Born: 21 October 1958 (age 67) Brunei
- Education: University of East Anglia (BA); Australian National University (MA)
- Occupation: Diplomat and artist

Shofry bin Haji Abdul Ghafor (born 21 October 1958) is a Bruneian diplomat and artist who served as Permanent Representative of Brunei Darussalam to the United Nations (UN) from 2002 to 2005. Additionally, he is the president of the Brunei Art Forum.

== Education ==
Shofry was educated at the University of East Anglia (BA, Development Studies) in 1981, and at the Australian National University (MA, International Studies) in 1992.

== Career ==
Shofry held the position of First Secretary at the Brunei Darussalam Permanent Mission to the United Nations in New York from 1993 to 1995. He served as the Ministry of Foreign Affairs' Assistant Director of the Association of South-East Asian Nations (ASEAN) Department between 1990 and 1993. He served as the Political Department's Assistant Director starting in 1986. He worked as the second secretary in the embassy of his nation in Jakarta, Indonesia, from 1983 until 1986. In 1981, he began working as an administrative officer for the Ministry of Foreign Affairs' Diplomatic Service Department.

The new Permanent Representative of Brunei Darussalam to the UN, Shofry, handed Secretary-General Kofi Annan his credentials on 1 October 2002. He worked in the Ministry of Foreign Affairs as the Director of the Department of Multilateral Economics from 2001. In addition to serving as Director of the Department of Politics at the same ministry from 1998 to 2001. He served as the Deputy Chief of Mission at the Brunei Darussalam Embassy in Washington, D.C., from 1995 to 1998.

After Shofry's tenure at the UN, he was reassigned to the position of permanent secretary at the Ministry of Foreign Affairs and Trade on 9 July 2005.

== Later life ==
Pehin Dato Halbi gave the Rainforest Gallery its official opening on 14 May 2014. Dato Shofry, the director and proprietor of the Rainforest Gallery, is also the president of the Brunei Art Forum and a well-known artist in Brunei. He gave Dato Mohd Isham BND10,180 in donations for the COVID-19 Relief Fund in Brunei.

== Personal life ==
Shofry was born on 21 October 1958. He is married to Datin Misnah Daud and has three daughters and one son.

== Honours ==
Throughout his career, he has earned the following honours:

- Order of Seri Paduka Mahkota Brunei Second Class (DPMB; 15 July 2006) – Dato Paduka

Diplomatic posts
Preceded by Serbini Ali	Permanent Representative of Brunei to the United Nations; 1 October 2002 – 9 July 2005	Succeeded by Emran Bahar
