= Alaihuddin Taha =

Bruneian diplomat (born 1958)

His Excellency Dato Paduka Alaihuddin Taha DPMB
- عليه الدين طه
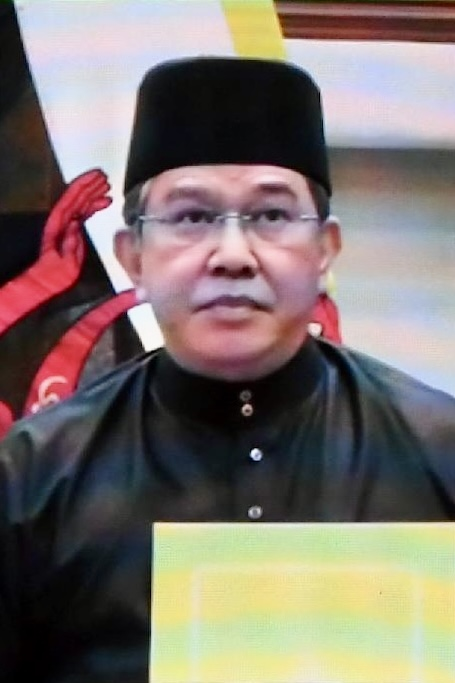
- Dato Alaihuddin in 2021

High Commissioner of Brunei to India
- Incumbent
- Assumed office 22 September 2021
- Monarch: Hassanal Bolkiah
- Preceded by: Sidek Ali

High Commissioner of Brunei to Malaysia
- In office 25 November 2014 – December 2020
- Preceded by: Ishaaq Abdullah
- Succeeded by: Mahmud Saidin

Permanent Representative of Brunei to the United Nations in Geneva
- In office July 2007 – 15 April 2008
- Preceded by: Mahadi Wasli
- Succeeded by: Janin Erih

Personal details
- Born: 29 May 1958 (age 68)
- Spouse: Mariani Bungsu
- Relations: Abu Hurairah (brother)
- Parent: Taha Hussain (father)
- Education: North Staffordshire Polytechnic
- Occupation: Diplomat; civil servant

Alaihuddin bin Haji Mohamad Taha (born 29 May 1958) is a Bruneian diplomat who has held the post of high commissioner to India since 2021. He was formerly the permanent representative to the United Nations at Geneva and high commissioner to Malaysia.

== Early life and education ==
Alaihuddin was born on 29 May 1958, to an aristocrat, Pehin Orang Kaya Digadong Seri Lela Dato Seri Utama Haji Mohamad Taha bin Pehin Orang Kaya Ratna Diraja Hussain. He has one child and is married to Datin Mariani Bongsu. He has a brother, Pehin Orang Kaya Setia Jaya Dato Paduka Haji Abu Hurairah. This made him the uncle of Huraini, clerk to the Legislative Council, and Hazarena, Intermediate Court Judge. He received a Bachelor of Arts (BA) degree in international studies from North Staffordshire Polytechnic in the United Kingdom in 1984.

== Diplomatic career ==
In 1986, Alaihuddin worked as the personal assistant to the Deputy Minister of Foreign Affairs, Zakaria Sulaiman, after joining the ministry in August 1984. He had two postings overseas: the Brunei high commission in New Zealand, where he worked as a second secretary in 1986, and the Brunei embassy in Washington, D.C., where he held the same position from 1987 to 1990. After his return to Brunei in 1990, he worked for the Ministry of Foreign Affairs' Southeast Asian political section in 1991. He headed the Brunei delegation to the fifty-fourth session of the General Assembly in 1994.

Alaihuddin was sent overseas once more in 1995, this time to work for the Brunei high commission in London as first secretary and then acting minister counselor. In the Ministry of Foreign Affairs, he was appointed deputy director of the Ministry of Foreign Affairs and Trade's (MOFAT) Department of International Organisations in 2001 and director of the department in 2003. In c. 2004, he was the Ministry of Communications' permanent secretary. He would then serve as the MOFAT's acting private and confidential secretary in January 2007. As the new Permanent Representative of Brunei to the United Nations Office at Geneva, Alaihuddin presented his credentials to Sergei Ordzhonikidze on 13 August 2007.

=== Malaysia ===
Alaihuddin was appointed as the Brunei high commissioner to Malaysia on 25 November 2014, with the Sultan consenting to give him his credentials at the Istana Nurul Iman on 14 September 2014. In September 2015, a group headed by Alaihuddin from Brunei paid a visit to Regional Corridor Development Authority's (RECODA) Kuching headquarters to discuss economic collaboration.

In 2019, Alaihuddin, during a Malaysia Healthcare Travel Council (MHTC)-hosted dinner in Kuala Lumpur, expressed hope for a friendship association between Brunei and Malaysian business owners to boost trade cooperation and leverage mutual strengths. He highlighted the importance of including both public and private sector members to sustain public-private partnerships as key economic growth drivers. This initiative aligns with Brunei's goal to strengthen economic ties within ASEAN.

Alaihuddin paid Muhyiddin Yassin a courtesy call on 7 December 2020. He arrived to say goodbye as his stay in Malaysia would expire later that month. In addition, he received praise from Al-Sultan Abdullah for his six years of service in Malaysia, particularly for fostering closer ties and collaboration between the two countries.

=== India ===
On 9 March 2021, Prince Al-Muhtadee Billah held separate audiences with the recently appointed envoys from Brunei, including Alaihuddin. On 22 September 2021, Alaihuddin gave the President Ram Nath Kovind a virtual ceremony in which he handed his credentials. He attended the 2nd Brunei Darussalam-India Joint Trade Committee Meeting on 11 March 2022. Later on 22 July, Kamalinne Pinitpuvadol, Secretary General of AALCO, paid him a courtesy call.

Alaihuddin also accompanied Halbi Mohd Yussof to the Ministerial Session of the Strategic Conference, India Energy Week 2023, and the 9th Asian Energy Ministerial Roundtable.

== Personal life ==
Alaihuddin is married to Datin Hajah Mariani binti Haji Bungsu, a patron of ASEAN Ladies' Circle (ALC) Brunei.

== Honours ==
Throughout his career, he has earned the following honours:

- Order of Seri Paduka Mahkota Brunei Second Class (DPMB; 15 July 2010) – Dato Paduka

Diplomatic posts
Preceded by Sidek Ali	High Commissioner of Brunei to India; 22 September 2021 – present	Succeeded by Incumbent
Preceded by Ishaaq Abdullah	High Commissioner of Brunei to Malaysia; 25 November 2014 – December 2020	Succeeded by Mahmud Saidin
Preceded by Mahadi Wasli	Permanent Representative of Brunei to the United Nations in Geneva; July 2007 – 15 April 2008	Succeeded by Janin Erih
