= Aziyan Abdullah =

Bruneian diplomat

Dato Paduka Aziyan Abdullah DPMB
- أزيان عبد الله
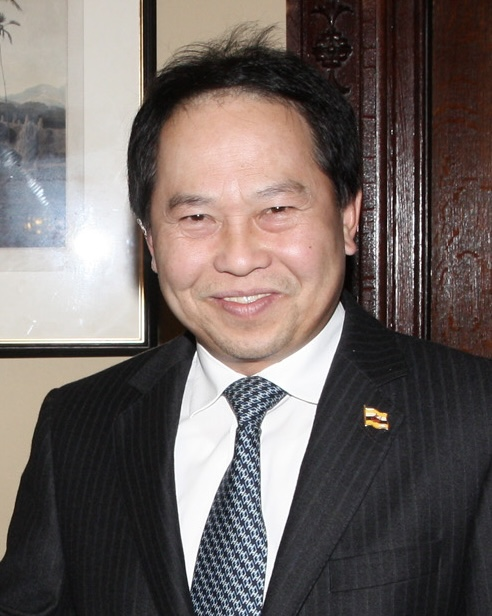
- Aziyan in 2012

High Commissioner of Brunei to the United Kingdom
- In office 10 December 2010 – 2014
- Preceded by: Pengiran Maidin
- Succeeded by: Aminuddin Ihsan

Personal details
- Born: Yong Foo Brunei
- Spouse: Nur Fadhlina Abdullah
- Occupation: Diplomat

Mohammad Aziyan bin Abdullah @ Yong Foo is a Bruneian diplomat of Chinese descent. He served as the high commissioner to the United Kingdom from 2010 to 2014, and as a non-resident ambassador to Greece.

== Diplomatic career ==
On 19 October 2010, Aziyan received his diplomatic credentials as Brunei's high commissioner to the United Kingdom from Sultan Hassanal Bolkiah at Istana Nurul Iman. A month later, on 18 November, he accompanied the then minister of development, Suyoi Osman, on a visit to Poundbury in Dorset. Subsequently, on 10 December, he was received in audience by Queen Elizabeth II at Buckingham Palace, where he formally presented the letters of recall of his predecessor, Pengiran Maidin, along with his own letters of commission as Brunei's high commissioner in London.

In an interview with Pelita Brunei on 26 April 2011, Aziyan shared that around 2,000 Bruneians residing in the United Kingdom and Ireland were expected to attend a Majlis Ramah Mesra with the sultan on 1 May at the Hilton Park Lane Hotel in London. Just over a month later, on 10 June, Aziyan was also present during the sultan's visit to the Household Cavalry Mounted Regiment at Hyde Park Barracks.

During his tenure, Aziyan witnessed several key developments in Brunei–United Kingdom relations. In 2012, Brunei contributed £1,000,000 to the Queen Elizabeth Diamond Jubilee Trust Fund, aimed at eliminating preventable cataracts and nurturing future leaders across the Commonwealth. That same year, the Commonwealth Charter, which had been passed in December, was formally approved—marking a significant milestone in reinforcing shared values among member states. On 30 December 2012, Aziyan was also on hand to the sultan and Queen Saleha at a Majlis Ramah Mesra with Bruneian students and citizens in the United Kingdom and Northern Ireland.

On 11 March 2013, Aziyan received the Commonwealth Charter from Commonwealth Secretary-General Kamalesh Sharma during the Commonwealth Day Reception, underscoring Brunei's commitment to the values enshrined in the document. During his tenure, he also met with Nikos Dendias to discuss strengthening bilateral relations, a shared commitment to international law and freedom of navigation, as well as Greece's candidacy for a seat on the United Nations Security Council. Aziyan concluded his service as Brunei's high commissioner to the United Kingdom in 2014, with Aminuddin Ihsan appointed as his successor.

== Later life ==
Following his diplomatic career, Aziyan is serving as the advisor of MPK Kampong Batang Mitus and Kampong Kebia.

== Personal life ==
Aziyan is married to Nur Fadhlina binti Abdullah, and the couple reside in Kampong Batang Mitus.

== Honours ==
Aziyan has been bestowed the following honours:

- Order of Seri Paduka Mahkota Brunei Second Class (DPMB; 15 September 2013) – Dato Paduka

Diplomatic posts
Preceded by Pengiran Maidin	High Commissioner of Brunei to the United Kingdom; 10 December 2010 – 2014	Succeeded by Aminuddin Ihsan
