= List of high commissioners of Brunei to the United Kingdom =

Coordinates: 51.4983549°N 0.1544540°E

High Commissioner of Brunei to the United Kingdom
- Emblem of Brunei

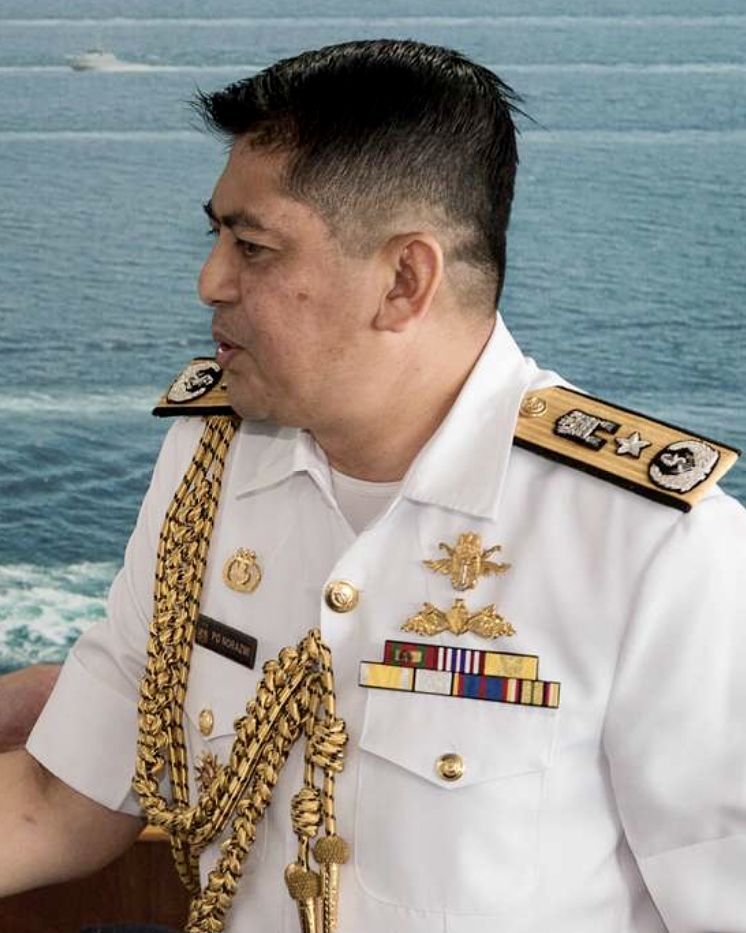
- Incumbent; Pengiran Norazmi since 20 June 2020
- Style: His Excellency
- Residence: London
- Appointer: Sultan of Brunei
- Term length: At His Majesty's pleasure
- Deputy: Noorfadlina Damit
- Website: Official website

The Bruneian high commissioner in London is the official representative of the Government in Bandar Seri Begawan to the Government of the United Kingdom. Prior to full independence in 1984, Brunei was a British protectorate, with international representation being the responsibility of the United Kingdom, in which its interests were represented by the "Brunei Government Agency" in London.

== List of high commissioners ==
Diplomatic agrément/Diplomatic accreditation	High Commissioner	Observations	Prime Minister of Brunei / Sultan of Brunei	Prime Minister of the United Kingdom	Term end
14 March 1984	Pengiran Setia Raja Pengiran Haji Jaya bin Pengiran Haji Rajid		Hassanal Bolkiah	Margaret Thatcher	1990
20 November 1990	Pengiran Dato Paduka Haji Mustafa bin Pengiran Metassan		Hassanal Bolkiah	Margaret Thatcher	1991
19 February 1991	Dato Seri Laila Jasa Haji Mohammad Kassim bin Haji Mohammad Daud		Hassanal Bolkiah	John Major	1993
8 December 1999	Dato Paduka Haji Yusoff bin Haji Abdul Hamid		Hassanal Bolkiah	Tony Blair	2001
21 February 2002	Pengiran Haji Yunus Pengiran Haji Mahmud	A memorandum of understanding (MoU) on defence was signed in Brunei on 31 December 2002. Brunei became a member of UNESCO on 17 March 2005, when the ambassador signed UNESCO's constitution.	Hassanal Bolkiah	Tony Blair	
7 June 2006	Pengiran Dato Paduka Haji Maidin bin Pengiran Haji Hashim	On 19 April 2007, a MoU was signed between the Ministry of Health and King's College London.	Hassanal Bolkiah	Tony Blair	
10 December 2010	Dato Paduka Haji Mohd Aziyan bin Abdullah	Brunei contributed £1,000,000.00 to the Queen Elizabeth Diamond Jubilee Trust Fund in 2012. It adopted the Charter of the Commonwealth in December 2012 and signed in 2013.	Hassanal Bolkiah	David Cameron	2014
12 November 2014	Major General (Retired) Dato Paduka Seri Haji Aminuddin Ihsan bin Pehin Orang Kaya Saiful Mulok Dato Seri Paduka Haji Abidin	Brunei joined the Queen's Commonwealth Canopy (QCC) in 2016, committing the Berakas Forest Recreation Park, Ulu Temburong National Park, and Pulau Selirong Forest Recreation Park.	Hassanal Bolkiah	David Cameron	30 January 2018
27 June 2019	Pengiran Hajah Rooslina Weti binti Pengiran Haji Kamaludin		Hassanal Bolkiah	Theresa May	
20 June 2020	First Admiral (Retired) Pengiran Dato Seri Pahlawan Norazmi bin Pengiran Haji Muhammad	In May 2023, the Sultan and Prince Abdul Mateen paid a state visit to London.	Hassanal Bolkiah	Boris Johnson	incumbent

== Gallery ==
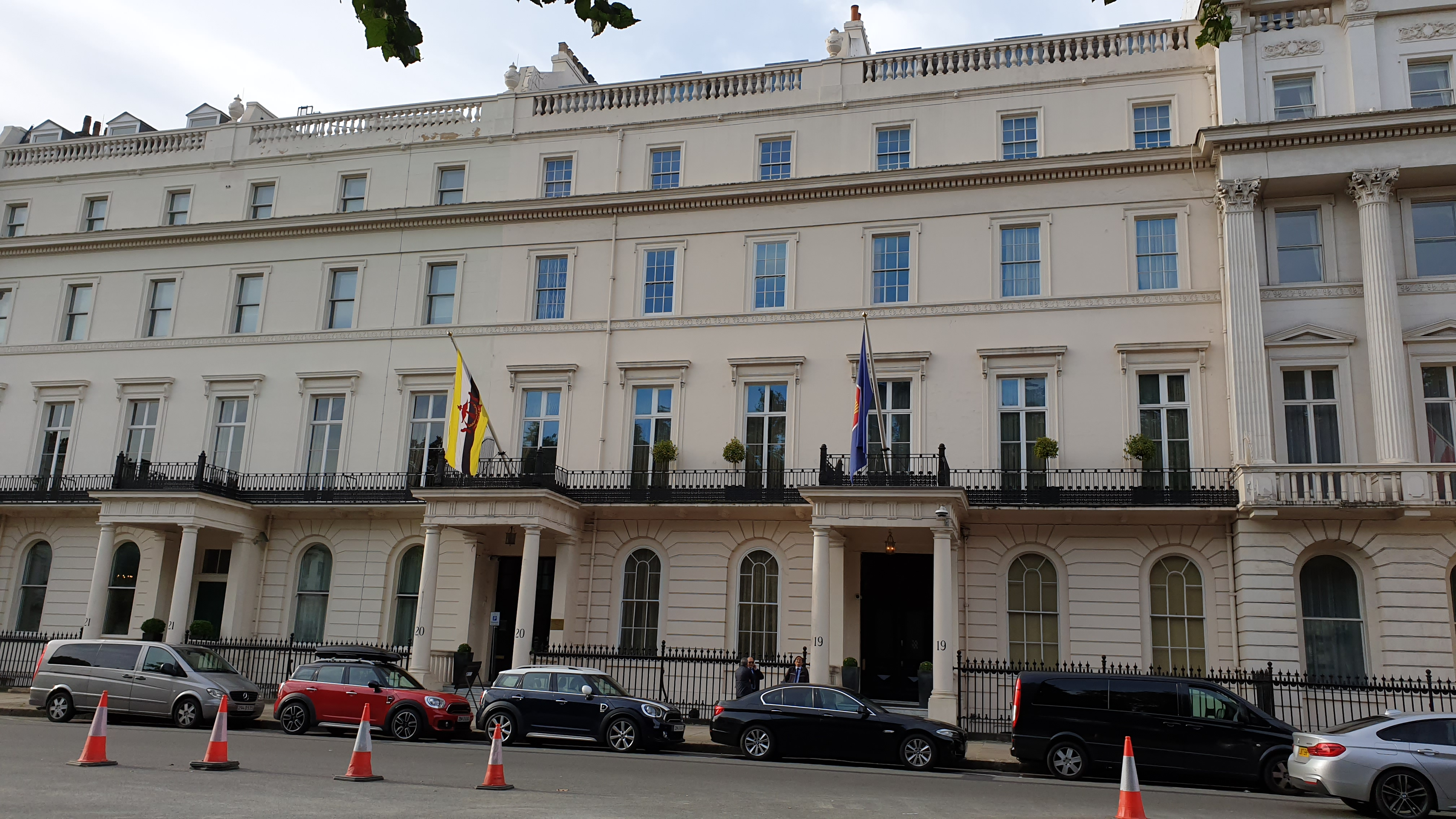
The Brunei High Commission building

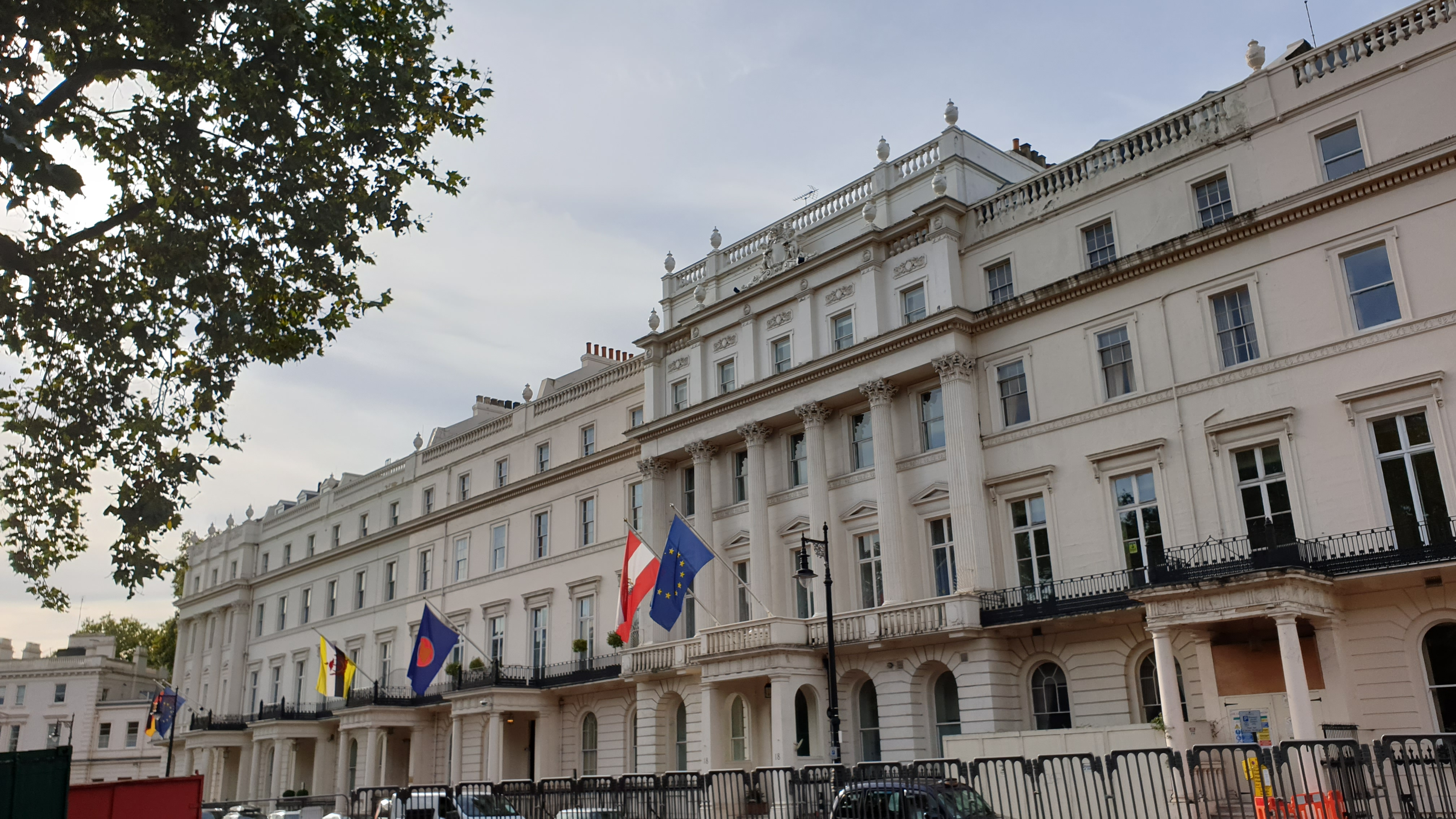
The Brunei High Commission next to the embassy of Austria

== See also ==
- Brunei–United Kingdom relations
- List of high commissioners of the United Kingdom to Brunei
