= Indians in Brunei =

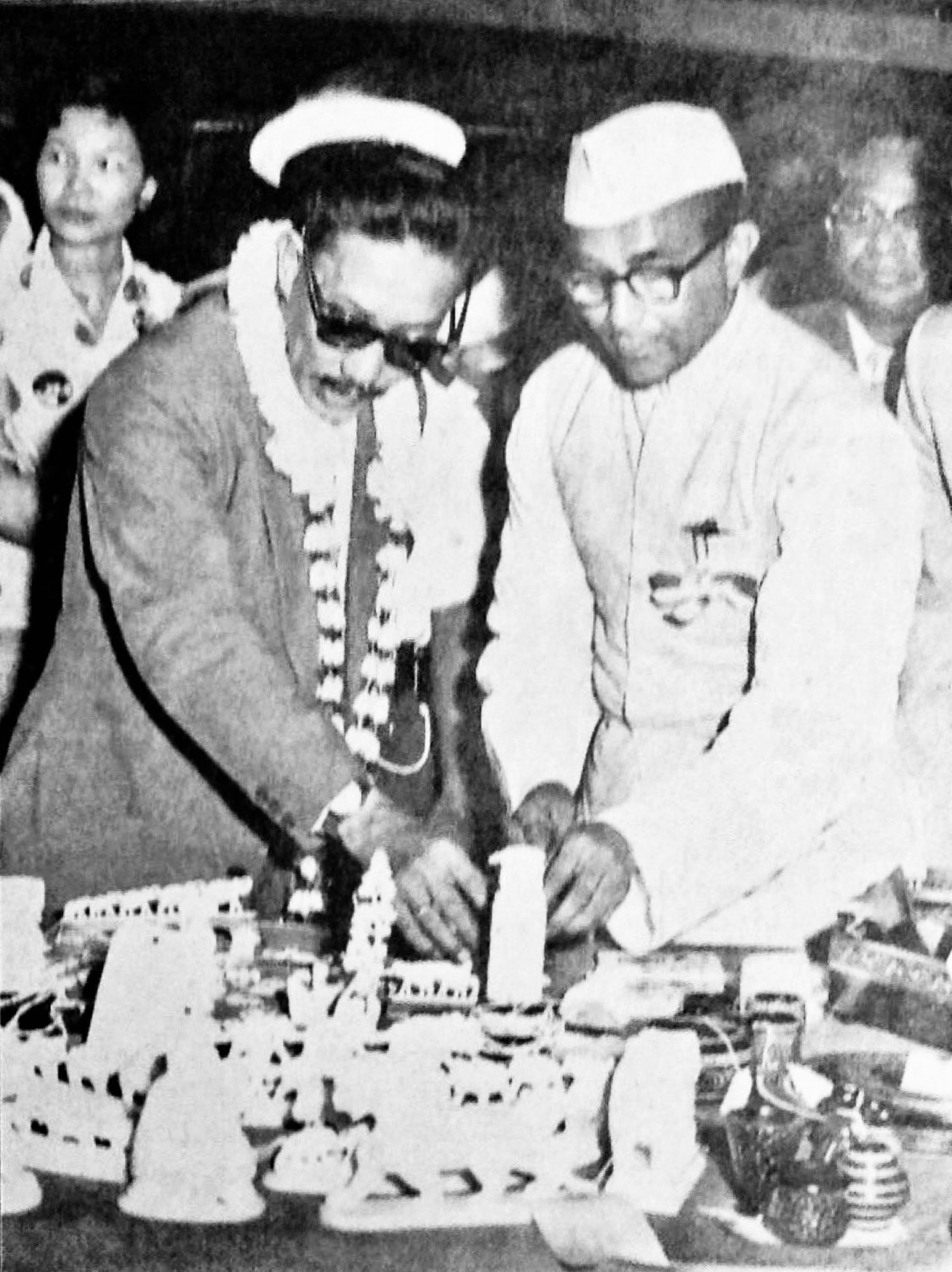
- Sultan Omar Ali Saifuddien III at a handicraft and Indian art exhibition in 1960

Total population
- 10,000; 2.3% of the Bruneian population (2012)

Regions with significant populations
- Bandar Seri Begawan and Kuala Belait

Languages
- Malay • Tamil • English

Religion
- Majority Islam and Hinduism; Minority Christianity · Sikhism • Buddhism

Related ethnic groups
- Indian Indonesians · Malaysian Indian · Indian Singaporeans

Indians in Brunei consist of Bruneians of Indian descent as well as expatriate professionals that have recently come to the country. According to the Government of India, there are 10,000 Indians living and working in the country.

== History ==
Indians in Brunei have had a notable presence in the country since the colonial days, however there are records from the Europeans who visited the region that there were people from the Indian Subcontinent already living there prior to European colonisation. According to United Nations statistics, the Indian population was counted in the Brunei census since the year of 1947. In 1971, Indians made up 1.6% of the population.

== Employment ==
The number of Indian nationals working in Brunei had increased since 2009. There are many Indian doctors and engineers working in Brunei and there are others working in the education sector, both at school and university or college level as professors and teachers as well as research personnel.

Other areas where Indians are employed include IT, oil and gas and mercantile.

== Ethnicity and Religion ==
Ethnic Tamils form the majority group of Indians in Brunei. The Indian community of Brunei consists of Muslims, Hindus, Christians and Sikhs. Islam is the dominant religion amongst the Indian community however Hinduism also forms a significant portion of the belief systems amongst the Indians. Brunei's 50-year-old Hindu Welfare Board functions as a Hindu religious organisation with approximately 3,000 members and there are two small Hindu temples in the country.

== See also ==
- Malaysian Indian
- Indian Indonesians
- Hinduism in Brunei
- Brunei–India relations
