= Haini Hashim =

Bruneian artist and diplomat

Dato Paduka Haini Hashim DPMB
- هايني هشيم
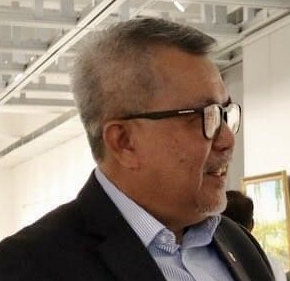
- Dato Haini at the Brunei Energy Hub in 2024

Ambassador of Brunei to Russia
- In office 2012–2022
- Preceded by: Emran Bahar
- Succeeded by: Husaini Alauddin

Personal details
- Born: Brunei
- Occupation: Artist; diplomat

Haini bin Haji Hashim is a Brunei artist and retired diplomat who became the ambassador to Russia from 2012 to 2022. He became the first Bruneian to be honored as a member of the Russian Academy of Arts in 2017.

== Diplomatic career ==
Earlier in Haiti's career, he took office as the head of protocol in the Ministry of Foreign Affairs and Trade (MOFAT). At MOFAT, he would also be the director of administration on 14 August 2005. The Russian Embassy held a celebration on 3 June 2012, in honour of Haini, the newly appointed ambassador of Brunei to Russia, who would be leaving for Moscow. On the 25th, Sultan Hassanal Bolkiah gave his approval for three recently chosen Brunei envoys—among them, Haini, the country's designated ambassador to Russia—to receive letter of credence. In December, he accompanied Mustappa Sirat on his working visit to the Russia.

In 2012, 2013, and 2016, the Sultan made three trips to Russia. Brunei was visited by Sergey Lavrov in 2012 and 2013. The two nations inked a number of Memorandum of Understandings (MoU) in the areas of commerce, energy, defense, education, and culture. Among Haini's major accomplishments during his ten years in Moscow were raising awareness of Brunei among the general public and officials, encouraging them to explore further avenues for cooperation, and establishing 14-day visa-free travel between Brunei and Russia in 2017, which in turn promoted tourism. Additionally, he built stronger understanding and improved cooperation in the area of Islamic faith and improved bilateral partnerships, particularly in the areas of education and tourism.

From 24 to 26 April 2018, he once again accompanied Halbi Mohammad Yussof to attend the 9th International Meeting of High-Ranking Officials Responsible for Security Matters in Sochi.

== Artistry ==
Haini claimed to be a self-taught artist who had never received any professional training or instruction in the arts. Through reading and observation, he developed his knowledge base, which in turn helped him to hone his unique visual aesthetic. In addition to his passion in abstract painting, he also likes painting landscapes and other natural subjects using oil paints. His career as a diplomat has provided him with significant benefits in exploring ideals and associated experiences in art. In order to foster bilateral collaboration between the two nations, he uses his art shows in Russia.

== Personal life ==
Haini runs a private gallery at his home in Kampong Sungai Tilong.

== Honours ==
In his fifth year as Brunei's ambassador, the Russian Academy of Arts gave him an honorary membership, making him the first Bruneian to earn such a distinction. He has earned the following honours;

National

- Order of Seri Paduka Mahkota Brunei Second Class (DPMB; 15 July 2017) – Dato Paduka

Foreign

- Russia:
  - Honorary Member of the Russian Academy of Arts (2017)

Diplomatic posts
Preceded by Emran Bahar	Ambassador of Brunei to Russia; 14 November 2005 – October 2008	Succeeded by Husaini Alauddin
