= Emran bin Bahar =

Bruneian diplomat (born 1961)

- امرن بن بهار
- Ambassador Emran in 2015

Ambassador of Brunei to Laos
- Incumbent
- Assumed office 29 March 2012
- Preceded by: Kasmirhan Tahir

Ambassador of Brunei to Russia
- In office 29 May 2009 – 2012
- Preceded by: Janin Erih
- Succeeded by: Haini Hashim

Permanent Representative of Brunei to the United Nations
- In office 27 April 2006 – 2008
- Preceded by: Shofry Abdul Ghafor
- Succeeded by: Latif Tuah

Personal details
- Born: 9 August 1961 (age 65) Brunei
- Education: Keele University (BA); Australian National University (MA; PhD)

Emran bin Bahar (born 9 August 1961) is a Bruneian diplomat and is currently the Ambassador Extraordinary and Plenipotentiary of Negara Brunei Darussalam to Laos. He was previously the Ambassador to the Russian Federation, the United Nations, and Cambodia.

== Education ==
Bahar was born on 9 August 1961. He completed his secondary education in Brunei before going abroad. Bahar graduated from Keele University with a B.A. in international relations and continued studies for his master's degree in international relations at the Australian National University in 1994; from which received his PhD in 1998.

== Career ==
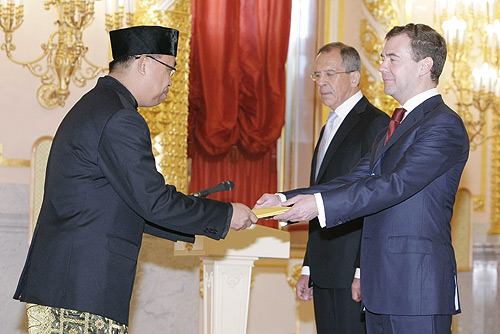
Emran presents his letter of credence to Russian president Dmitry Medvedev in 2009

In January 1986 he started working in the Ministry of Foreign Affairs as an Administrative officer before he went to complete his studies, and was then, from June to December 1992, the Assistant Director of the Political Affairs Department in the ministry. He then worked variously as an administrative officer as a deputy director and director for multiple department before becoming the secretary to the Minister of Foreign Affairs from 2002 to 2004. Afterward, from 2004 to 2006, he was the Ambassador of Brunei to Cambodia. He was then assigned as the ambassador to the United Nations (UN) from 2006 to 2008.

As of 2008, Emran was working as a Deputy Permanent Secretary 1 at the Ministry of Defence. On 9 April 2012, Prince Al-Muhtadee Billah granted permission for two recently appointed Brunei envoys, including Emran (Brunei Ambassador to Laos), to attend. Sultan Hassanal Bolkiah gave each envoy their individual letters of credentials on 29 March. In addition to this, he was the director of Policy Planning Department in 2013.

Diplomatic posts
Preceded by Kasmirhan Tahir	Ambassador of Brunei to Laos; 29 March 2012 – present	Incumbent
Preceded by Janin Erih	Ambassador of Brunei to Russia; 29 May 2009 – 2009	Succeeded by Haini Hashim
Preceded by Shofry Abdul Ghafor	Permanent Representative of Brunei to the United Nations; 27 April 2006 – 2008	Succeeded by Latif Tuah
