= Abdul Mokti Daud =

Bruneian politician and diplomat

Dato Seri Setia Abdul Mokti Daud PSNB SPMB PJK PKL
- عبدالموكتي داود
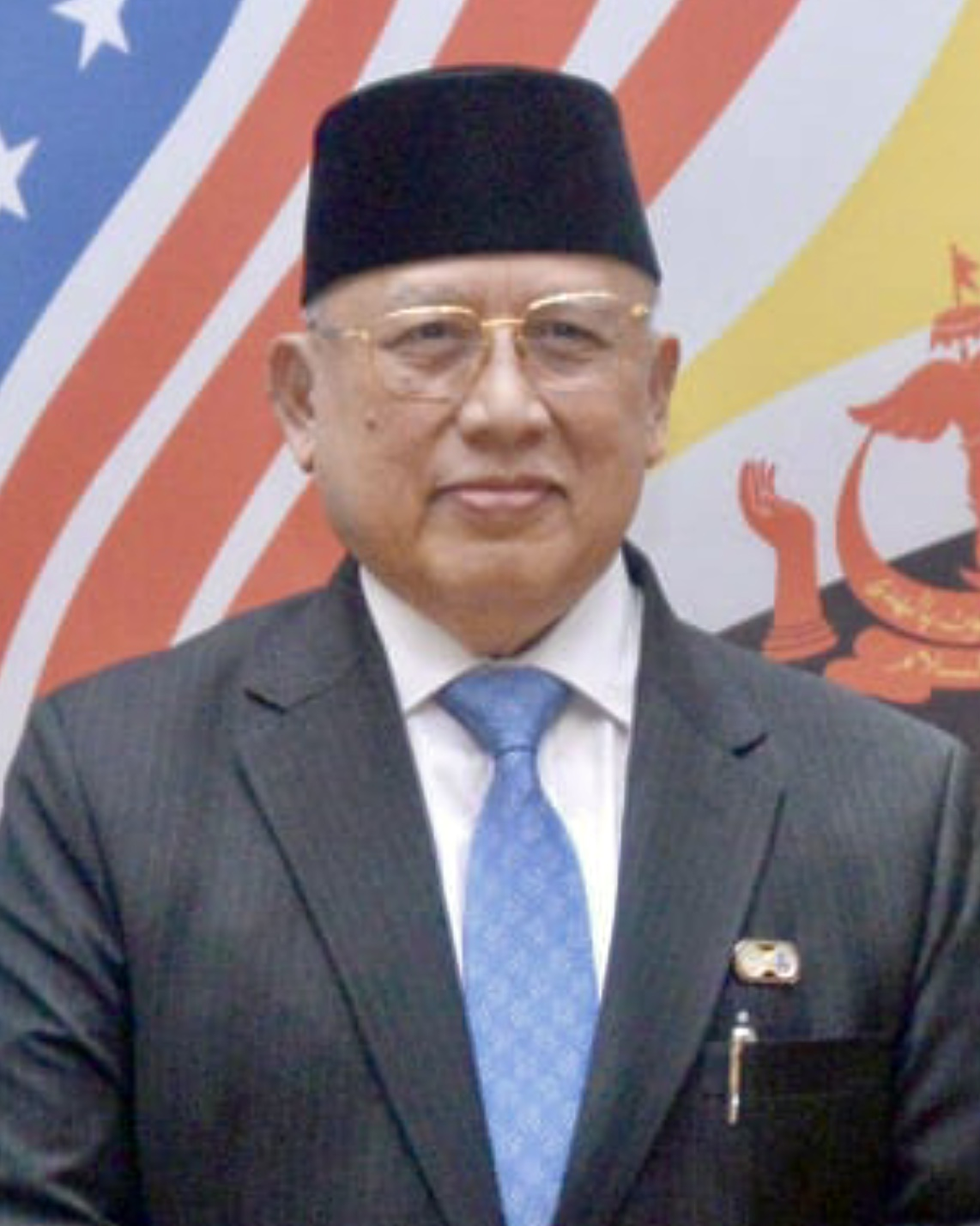
- Minister Abdul Mokti in 2021

Minister at the Prime Minister's Office
- In office 30 January 2018 – 7 June 2022 Serving with Isa Ibrahim and Amin Liew Abdullah
- Monarch: Hassanal Bolkiah
- Deputy: Elinda C.A. Mohammad
- Preceded by: Abdul Rahman Ibrahim; Lim Jock Seng
- Succeeded by: Halbi Mohammad Yussof

4th Deputy Minister of Religious Affairs
- In office 22 October 2015 – 30 January 2018
- Minister: Badaruddin Othman
- Preceded by: Pengiran Bahrom
- Succeeded by: Pengiran Bahrom
Diplomatic positions
Ambassador of Brunei to Saudi Arabia
In office 25 May 2013 – 22 October 2015
Preceded by	Pengiran Jaberuddin
Succeeded by	Yusoff Ismail
In office 1989–1999
Ambassador of Brunei to Jordan
In office 6 June 2006 – 14 November 2012
Preceded by	Husin Ahmad
Succeeded by	Nooradin Yaakob
High Commissioner of Brunei to Bangladesh
In office 19 September 2001 – 9 November 2005
Preceded by	Position established
Succeeded by	Abdul Rahman
High Commissioner of Brunei to India
In office 16 October 1997 – 2001
Preceded by	Adnan Buntar
Succeeded by	Abdul Ghafar Ismail
Ambassador of Brunei to Iran
In office April 1996 – August 1997

Personal details
- Born: 1946/1947 (age 79–80) Brunei
- Spouse: Zalina Omar
- Education: Sultan Omar Ali Saifuddien College
- Occupation: Politician; diplomat

Abdul Mokti bin Haji Mohd Daud (born 1946/1947) is a Bruneian retired politician and diplomat who served as the Deputy Minister of Religious Affairs (MoRA) from 2015 to 2018, and Minister at the Prime Minister's Office (PMO) from 2018 to 2022. Additionally, he was among the board of directors of the Monetary Authority of Brunei Darussalam (AMBD).

== Education ==
Abdul Mokti completed his early education at Muhammad Alam Malay School in Seria, Berakas Malay School, Sultan Muhammad Jamalul Alam Malay School and Sultan Omar Ali Saifuddien College. He then went on to earn degrees and diplomas from a number of universities, colleges, and educational institutions in Cairo, Birmingham, Selangor and Singapore.

== Early career ==
Abdul Mokti started working for the Bruneian government on 1 December 1971. He was the principal of the Hassanal Bolkiah Boys' Arabic Secondary School, the deputy director of the Islamic Da'wah Centre, the principal of the Seri Begawan Religious Teachers College, the chief religious development officer (propagation and tabligh), and the director of propagation and tabligh, among other positions. He also held a brief position as deputy director of Welfare, Youth and Sports at the Ministry of Culture, Youth and Sports from 1983 to 1985, in addition to his work at the MoRA.

== Diplomatic career ==
Serving at the then-Ministry of Foreign Affairs (MoFA) for over thirty years, he began as Director of Administration before moving up to the post of Private and Confidential Secretary to Prince Mohamed Bolkiah, who was the Minister of Foreign Affairs at the time. Abdul Mokti has extensive professional experience as well, having served for 26 years in a row as high commissioner, as well as ambassador extraordinary and plenipotentiary. He has been the Head of Brunei's diplomatic mission abroad for the longest.

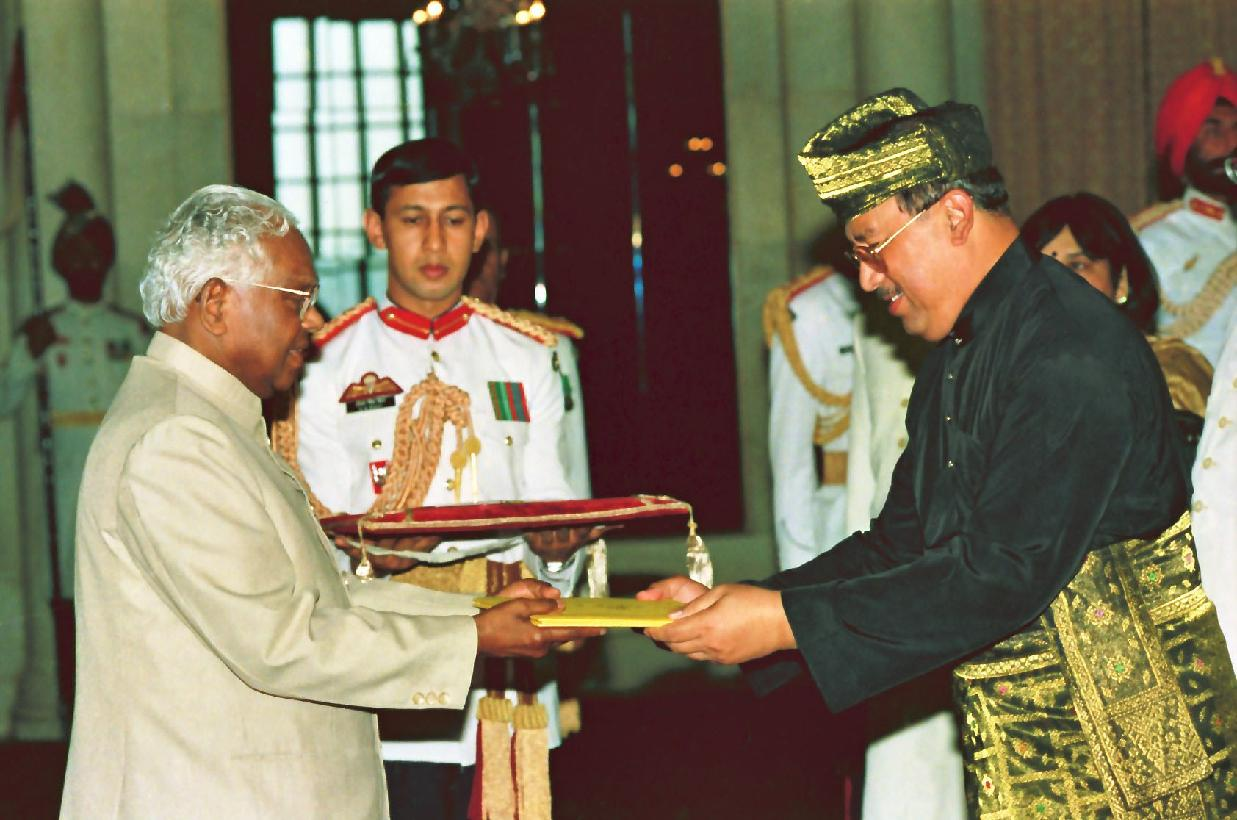
President K. R. Narayanan accepting Abdul Mokti's letter of credence in 1997

From 1994 to 1995, he was then designated as the chargé d'affaires high commissioner to Bangladesh. He was appointed as the ambassador to Iran from April 1996 to August 1997, and then as the high commissioner to India from 1997 to 2001, presenting his letter of credence to President K. R. Narayanan on 16 October 1997, at the Ashok Hall of Rashtrapati Bhavan in New Delhi. He was also designated as the plenipotentiary to Nepal and at the same time, non-resident high commissioner/ambassador extraordinary to Sri Lanka. He oversaw Bruneian government's diplomatic relations with the Maldives concurrently.

Abdul Mokti served as the first high commissioner to Bangladesh from 18 September 2001 to 9 November 2005. On 12 April 2006, the Sultan appointed him as the ambassador to Jordan, a position he held from 6 June 2006 to 14 November 2012. Abdul Mokti was also appointed as the non-resident ambassador to Turkey and Yemen. In addition, he oversaw official affairs for the Bruneian government in Syria, Lebanon, and Palestine.

On 25 May 2013, he was appointed to the position of ambassador to Saudi Arabia for a second time. At the OIC Headquarters on 20 May 2015, Ambassador Abdul Mokti signed the Framework Agreement on Trade Preferential System and the General Agreement on Economic, Technical, and Commercial Cooperation.

Around the world, Abdul Mokti has attended conferences and meetings in places like New York, Washington, D.C., Geneva, the United Kingdom, ASEAN countries, Cyprus, Pakistan, India, Sri Lanka, Malta, Morocco, Egypt, and other European countries. As a member of the delegation of Prince Mohamed Bolkiah, he also actively participates in attending international conferences and meetings that encompass the Middle East, Europe, Japan, Korea, and numerous other Asian nations.

== Ministerial career ==
During a cabinet reshuffle on 22 October 2015, he was appointed as deputy minister of religious affairs. In another cabinet reshuffle on 30 January 2018, Sultan Hassanal Bolkiah nominated Abdul Mokti as Minister at the PMO for a five-year tenure. Further solidifying bilateral ties, Minister Abdul Mokti was present at the groundbreaking ceremony on 27 August, for the new embassy of Saudi Arabia in Brunei.

On 9 January 2019, Abdul Mokti demanded that the Public Works Department reassess how it fulfills its mandates and adds value in areas like the department's framework projects, leadership development, succession planning, auditing of human resources, planning of training requirements for the public sector, and work ethics, discipline, and integrity.

Position freezes are no longer frozen at the moment, in addition to filling vacancies with extreme caution during the ongoing conversation between the PMO and the ministries is one of the actions that have been done, he revealed on 13 September 2019.

COVID-19 pandemic in 2020 affected the development of the ASEAN Community. Due to the worldwide shutdown, ASEAN's information sector not only became a crucial source of data but also had the duty to ensure that the information provided was accurate and timely. Abdul Mokti made this statement on 12 March 12, 2021, while participating by video conference in the 15th Conference of the ASEAN Ministers Responsible for Information (15th AMRI) and Related Meetings, which was held at the PMO.

According to Abdul Mokti on 26 February 2022, the ongoing COVID-19 pandemic has continued to have an influence on national budgetary allocation and revenue, which has unavoidably made it more difficult for the country to implement its plans for a sustainable economy and fiscal balance. According to Abdul Mokti, digital transformation activities have assumed a significant role and have drawn increased attention, particularly during the COVID-19 pandemic where they have been stepped up.

On 7 June 2022, Sultan Hassanal Bolkiah announced a cabinet reshuffle where several cabinet ministers were replaced including Abdul Mokti. He was succeeded as PMO Minister by Pehin Dato Halbi.

== Personal life ==
Abdul Mokti is married to Datin Hajah Zalina binti Haji Omar; together, they have six children and nine grandkids.

== Honours ==
Abdul Mokti has earned the following honours:

- Order of Setia Negara Brunei First Class (PSNB; 15 July 2018) – Dato Seri Setia
- Order of Seri Paduka Mahkota Brunei First Class (SPMB; 15 July 2017) – Dato Seri Paduka
- Meritorious Service Medal (PJK)
- Long Service Medal (PKL)
- Proclamation of Independence Medal (1997)

Diplomatic posts
Preceded by Pengiran Jaberuddin	Ambassador of Brunei to Saudi Arabia; 25 May 2013 – 22 October 2015	Succeeded by Yusoff Ismail
Preceded by Husin Ahmad	Ambassador of Brunei to Jordan; 6 June 2006 – 14 November 2012	Succeeded by Nooradin Yaakob
Preceded by Position established	High Commissioner of Brunei to Bangladesh; 19 September 2001 – 9 November 2005	Succeeded by Abdul Rahman
Preceded by Adnan Buntar	High Commissioner of Brunei to India; 16 October 1997 – 2001	Succeeded by Abdul Ghafar Ismail
Political offices
Preceded by Pengiran Bahrom	4th Deputy Minister of Religious Affairs; 22 October 2015 – 30 January 2018	Succeeded by Pengiran Bahrom
