= Janin Erih =

Bruneian diplomat (born 1949)

Dato Paduka Janin Erih DPMB
- جنين اراه
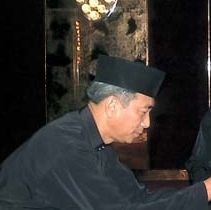
- Janin receives his credentials from Hassanal Bolkiah in 2004

Permanent Representative of Brunei to the United Nations in Geneva
- In office 15 April 2008 – 22 October 2011
- Preceded by: Alaihuddin Taha
- Succeeded by: Kasmirhan Tahir

Ambassador of Brunei to Russia
- In office 22 December 2004 – 2007
- Preceded by: Mahadi Wasli
- Succeeded by: Emran Bahar

Personal details
- Born: 18 June 1949 (age 77) Brunei
- Education: Universiti Brunei Darussalam
- Occupation: Lecturer; diplomat

Janin bin Erih (born 18 June 1949) is a retired Bruneian diplomat and educator who held the post of Permanent Representative of Brunei Darussalam to the United Nations at Geneva and the former Ambassador Extraordinary and Plenipotentiary of Brunei to the Russian Federation.

== Early life and education ==
Janin was born on 18 June 1949. He holds several academic credentials from British universities, including an MBA. He has spent the most of his career working in the educational sector, such as being a lecturer at the Sixth Form Centre in c. 1979. From 1986 until 2004, he worked at the University of Brunei Darussalam in a variety of roles, the last of which was Assistant Vice Chancellor from 2002 to 2004. From 1982 to 1986, he was employed by the Ministry of Education, serving from 1985 to 1986 as the unit's head of building planning. In 1976, he began working as an educational officer.

== Diplomatic career ==
Janin had been serving as Brunei's ambassador to Russia since 2004 prior to his appointment to Geneva. The Director-General of the United Nations Office at Geneva, Sergei Ordzhonikidze, received his credentials on 23 May 2008 as the next Permanent Representative of Brunei Darussalam. On 17 March 2010, at the 13th session of the Human Rights Council, Dian Triansyah Djani commended Janin for delivering an update on the initiatives of the Indonesian government is taking to advance and defend human rights in Brunei.

== Personal life ==
Janin has a daughter named Sarah and two sons named Liam, who resides in Brunei with his family and Keeran, who serves as the chief executive officer of Dart Logistics.

== Honours ==
Throughout his career, he has earned the following honours:

- Order of Seri Paduka Mahkota Brunei Second Class (DPMB; 15 July 2010) – Dato Paduka

Diplomatic posts
Preceded by Alaihuddin Taha	Permanent Representative of Brunei to the United Nations in Geneva; 15 April 2008 – 22 October 2011	Succeeded by Kasmirhan Tahir
Preceded by Mahadi Wasli	Ambassador of Brunei to Russia; 22 December 2004 – 2007	Succeeded by Emran Bahar
