= Aminuddin Ihsan =

Bruneian military officer (born 1966)

Major General (Retired) Dato Paduka Seri Aminuddin Ihsan DPKT SMB PJK
- أمين الدين إحسان
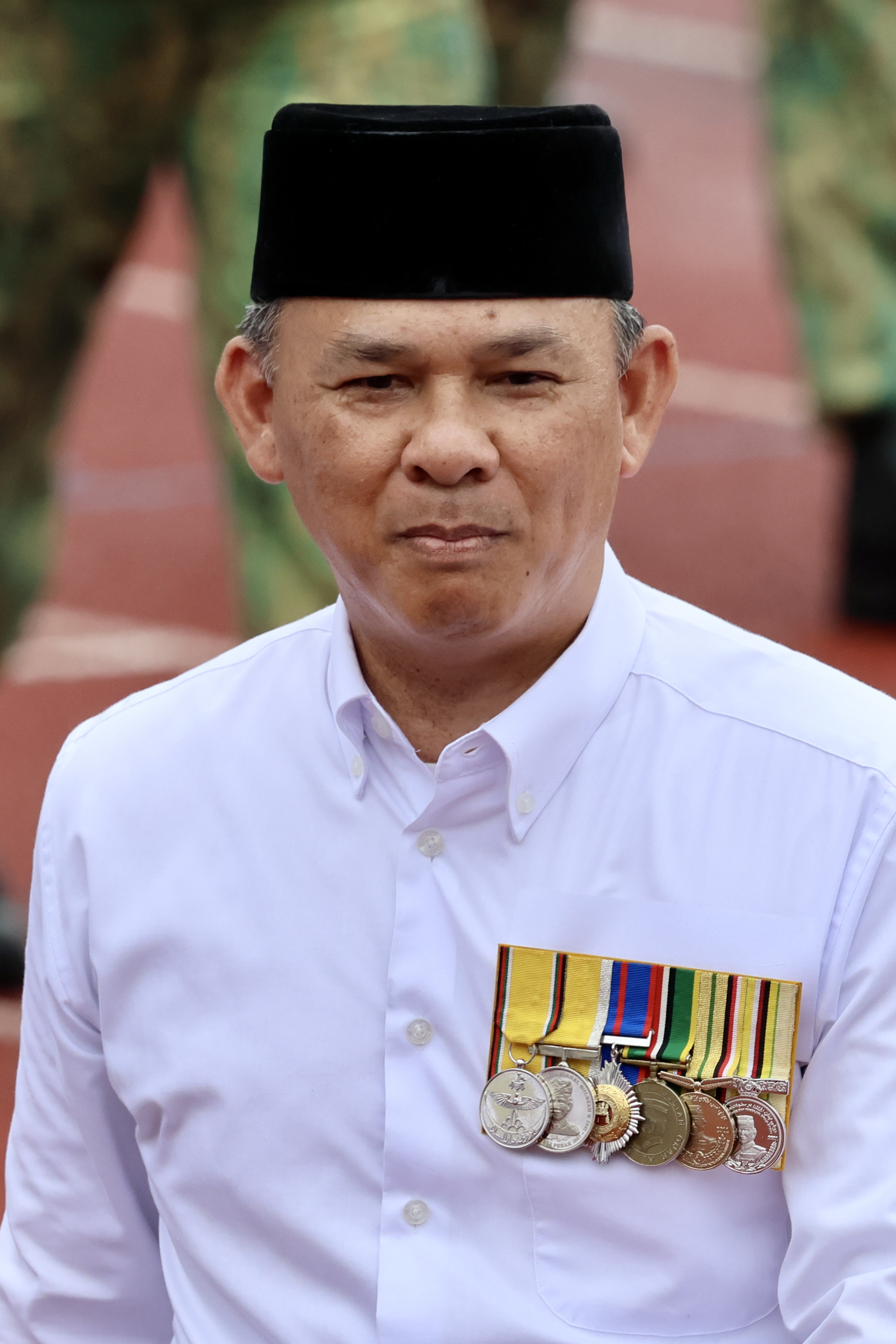
- Aminuddin Ihsan in 2024

7th Minister of Culture, Youth and Sports
- In office 30 January 2018 – 7 June 2022
- Monarch: Hassanal Bolkiah
- Preceded by: Halbi Mohammad Yussof
- Succeeded by: Nazmi Mohamad

8th Commander of the Royal Brunei Armed Forces
- In office 31 December 2009 – 29 January 2014
- Deputy: Mohammad Tawih
- Preceded by: Halbi Mohammad Yussof
- Succeeded by: Mohammad Tawih

7th Commander of the Royal Brunei Land Force
- In office 12 December 2008 – 13 November 2009
- Deputy: Yussof Abdul Rahman
- Preceded by: Rosli Chuchu
- Succeeded by: Yussof Abdul Rahman
Diplomatic positions
High Commissioner of Brunei to the United Kingdom
In office 15 May 2014 – 30 January 2018
Preceded by	Aziyan Abdullah
Succeeded by	Rooslina Weti

Personal details
- Born: 23 July 1966 (age 59) Brunei
- Spouse: Nurhayana Janis Abdullah
- Parent(s): Abidin Abdul Rashid (father); Fatimah Razali (mother)
- Education: Australian Defence College
- Profession: Military officer; diplomat

Military service
- Branch/service: Royal Brunei Land Force
- Years of service: 1988–2014
- Rank: Major General
- Unit: First Battalion RBLF; Auxiliary Battalion RBLF; International Monitoring Team
- Commands: Head of Research Wing; Strategic Planning Ministry of Defence; Second Battalion RBLF; Training Institute RBAF

Aminuddin Ihsan bin Haji Abidin (born 23 July 1966) is a Bruneian civil servant, diplomat, and military officer. He served as the commander of the Royal Brunei Land Force (RBLF) from 2008 to 2009 and later as the commander of the Royal Brunei Armed Forces (RBAF) from 2009 to 2014. Following his military career, he was appointed Brunei's high commissioner to the United Kingdom from 2014 to 2018 before serving as the minister of culture, youth, and sports (MCYS) from 2018 to 2022. Additionally, he led Brunei’s first contingent in the International Monitoring Team (IMT) in Mindanao.

== Early life and education ==
Aminuddin Ihsan was born on 23 July 1966 and is one of six children of Abidin Abdul Rashid, who served as deputy minister of home affairs from 1986 to 2002, and Fatimah Razali. He earned a Bachelor of Science (BSc) degree in civil engineering and a Master of Arts (MA) degree in military studies. Throughout his career, he pursued further professional development, attending courses such as the United Nations Military Observer and Staff Officer Course, the Battalion Tactics Course, and the Joint Staff Course in the United Kingdom. Notably, he also obtained a fellowship while attending the Defence & Strategic Studies Course at the Australian Defence College.

== Military career ==
Aminuddin Ihsan was officially commissioned into the RBLF as a lieutenant on 19 September 1988. Throughout his military career, he held various important positions, including platoon leader of Company 'D' in the 1st Battalion, troop leader of the Auxiliary Battalion, commanding officer in the Infantry Battalion, and deputy commanding officer and commanding officer of the 2nd Battalion. He also served as the commander of the Training Institute RBAF.

In 2004–2005, then-Colonel Aminuddin Ihsan led Brunei's IMT contingent, Batch 1, to Mindanao, Southern Philippines. His team was tasked with observing the peace negotiations between the government of the Philippines and the Moro Islamic Liberation Front. As part of his international duties, he played a vital role in monitoring the progress of these peace talks. Additionally, Aminuddin Ihsan was a key figure in the establishment of the Defence Academy RBAF in September 2008.

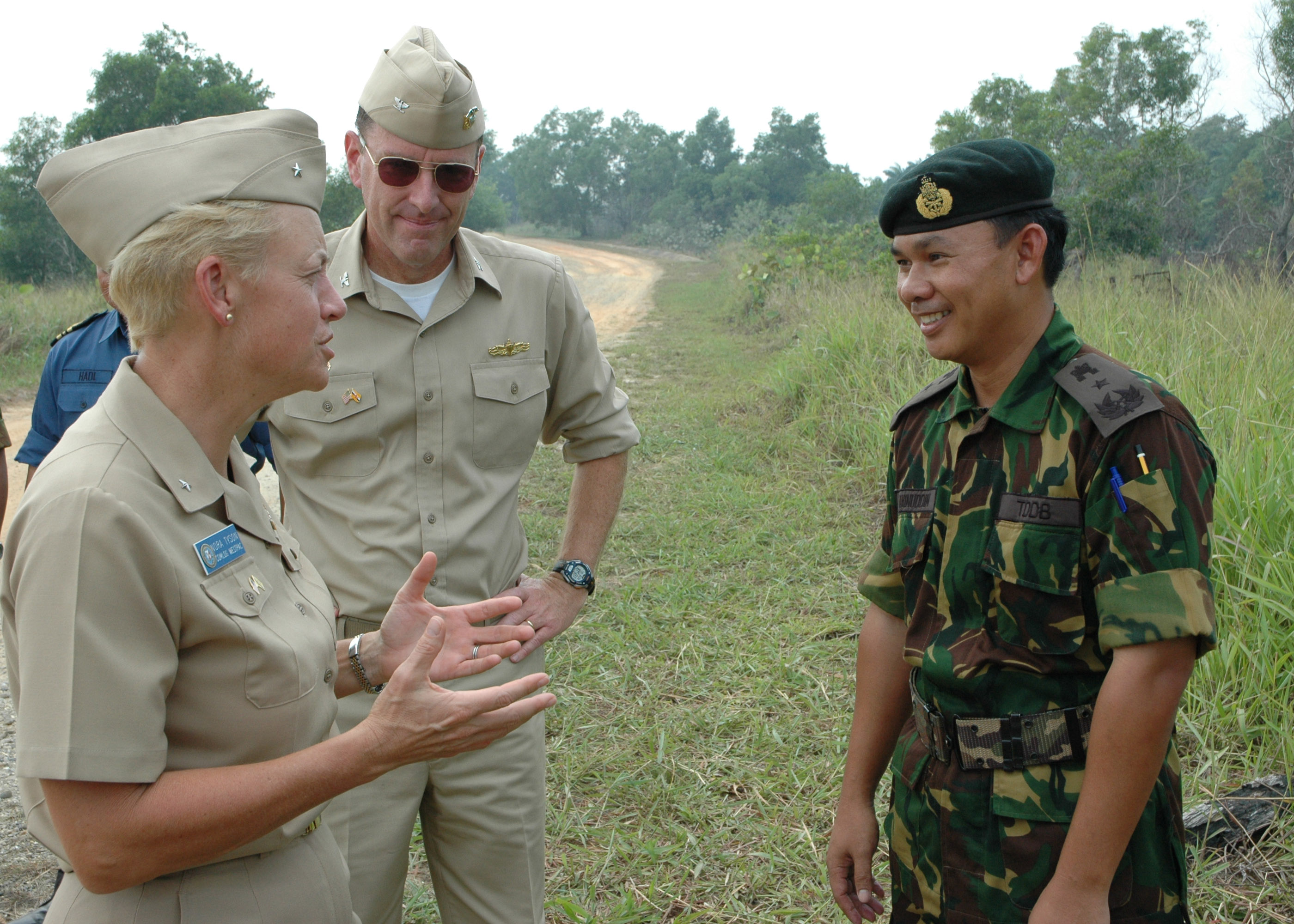
Nora Tyson (left) and Aminuddin Ihsan (right) during CARAT 2009

On 12 December 2008, Aminuddin Ihsan was appointed commander of the RBLF, a position he held until 13 November 2009. He succeeded Halbi Mohammad Yussof as the commander of the RBAF on 31 December 2009, marking a significant leadership transition. The handover ceremony took place at Tutong Camp, with RBAF officers and staff present to witness the change in command.

In March 2010, he attended the 7th ASEAN Chiefs of Defence Forces Informal Meeting in Hanoi, Vietnam, and in January 2011, he made an introductory visit to the Royal Thai Armed Forces Headquarters, where he was welcomed by Songkitti Jaggabatara, Chief of Defence Forces. Later that year, on 7 March, he visited Malaysia's Ministry of Defence, where he inspected a guard of honour, met with the Chief of Defence Forces, Azizan Ariffin, and visited key defence institutions.

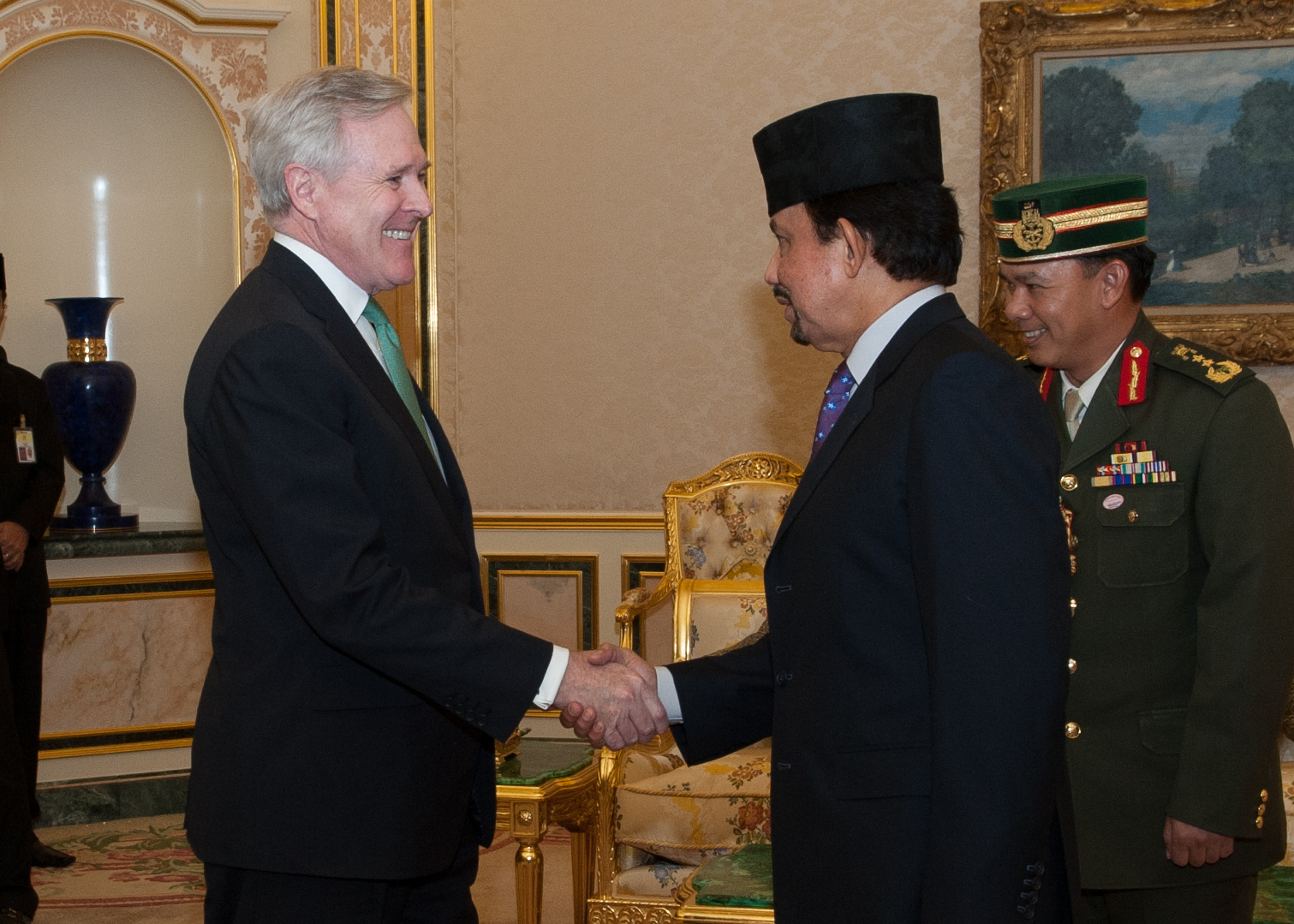
SECNAV Ray Mabus meets with Sultan Hassanal Bolkiah accompanied by Aminuddin Ihsan in 2012

In May 2011, Aminuddin Ihsan greeted Sultan Hassanal Bolkiah at the Berakas Garrison for the RBAF golden jubilee celebration, which featured a large parade of 1,250 personnel under the theme "Defending My Country - Brunei Darussalam." On 1 September 2012, he alongside Mustappa Sirat, convened a news conference at the Ministry of Defence at Bolkiah Garrison to announce the results of a five-week inquiry by the Supreme Board of Inquiry into the 2012 Rampayoh helicopter crash. On 12 November 2012, he visited the United Kingdom to strengthen defence ties, meeting with senior British military leaders including Mark Stanhope, Peter Wall, and Stephen Dalton during his four-day official visit.

On 23 January 2013, Aminuddin Ihsan visited Beijing, where he met with China's Minister of Defence, Liang Guanglie, and Chief of Joint Staff Department, Fang Fenghui, to discuss strengthening cooperation between the RBAF and the People's Liberation Army. Later that year, on 19 March, he led Brunei's delegation at the 10th ASEAN Defence Ministers' Meeting (ACDFIM), aiming to enhance regional military cooperation and maintain peace and stability.

Aminuddin Ihsan handed over his role as chairman of the RBAF Cooperative, KOWIRA, to Mohammad Tawih on 24 January 2014, expressing confidence in his successor's leadership. Shortly after, on 30 January, he officially handed over his duties as commander of the RBAF to Mohammad Tawih in a ceremony at Berakas Garrison.

== Diplomatic career ==
Aminuddin Ihsan, newly appointed as Brunei's high commissioner to the United Kingdom, was presented with the letter of credence by Sultan Hassanal Bolkiah at Istana Nurul Iman on 15 May 2014. Later that year, on 12 November, he presented his credentials to Elizabeth II at Buckingham Palace in London. On 15 February 2015, Aminuddin Ihsan was also present to greet Sultan Hassanal Bolkiah upon his arrival in London for a meeting with UK Prime Minister David Cameron, which included a signing ceremony for the exchange of notes and letters between Brunei and the UK.

== Political career ==
On 30 January 2018, Aminuddin Ihsan was appointed as the minister of culture, youth, and sports in a cabinet reshuffle announced by Sultan Hassanal Bolkiah, with his term set for five years. Later, on 5 December, he reminded Brunei's athletes participating in the 10th BIMPNT-EAGA Friendship Games to uphold the Melayu Islam Beraja philosophy, follow the rules, and maintain good conduct, encouraging them to compete with pride and professionalism.

Aminuddin Ihsan highlighted the crucial role of ASEAN youth in driving sustainable development and fostering regional integration during the 11th ASEAN Ministerial Meeting on Youth in Vientiane on 19 July 2019. He underscored their dynamic contribution to the region's progress, aligning with the theme of AMMY XI, and reaffirmed Brunei's commitment to youth empowerment through initiatives in engagement, entrepreneurship, and education under a Whole of Nation approach. Later, on 24 September 2020, Aminuddin announced updated guidelines for sports competitions, allowing six individual sports to resume under strict health protocols.

On 10 January 2021, Aminuddin Ihsan highlighted the importance of the newly appointed leadership of the Brunei–China Friendship Association in strengthening ties and expanding cooperation, particularly through youth and cultural initiatives, during the 6th Leadership Oath Ceremony for the 2021–2023 term. Additionally, he chaired the ASEAN Socio-Cultural Community Pillar in 2021 and attended the G20 Ministerial Conference on Women's Empowerment as an invited guest of Italy, where he stressed ASEAN's 2021 theme, "We Care, We Prepare, We Prosper," reaffirmed ASEAN's commitment to gender equality and women's empowerment, and discussed various regional initiatives.

Following another cabinet reshuffle on 7 June 2022, he was succeeded by Nazmi Mohamad as the minister.

== Personal life ==
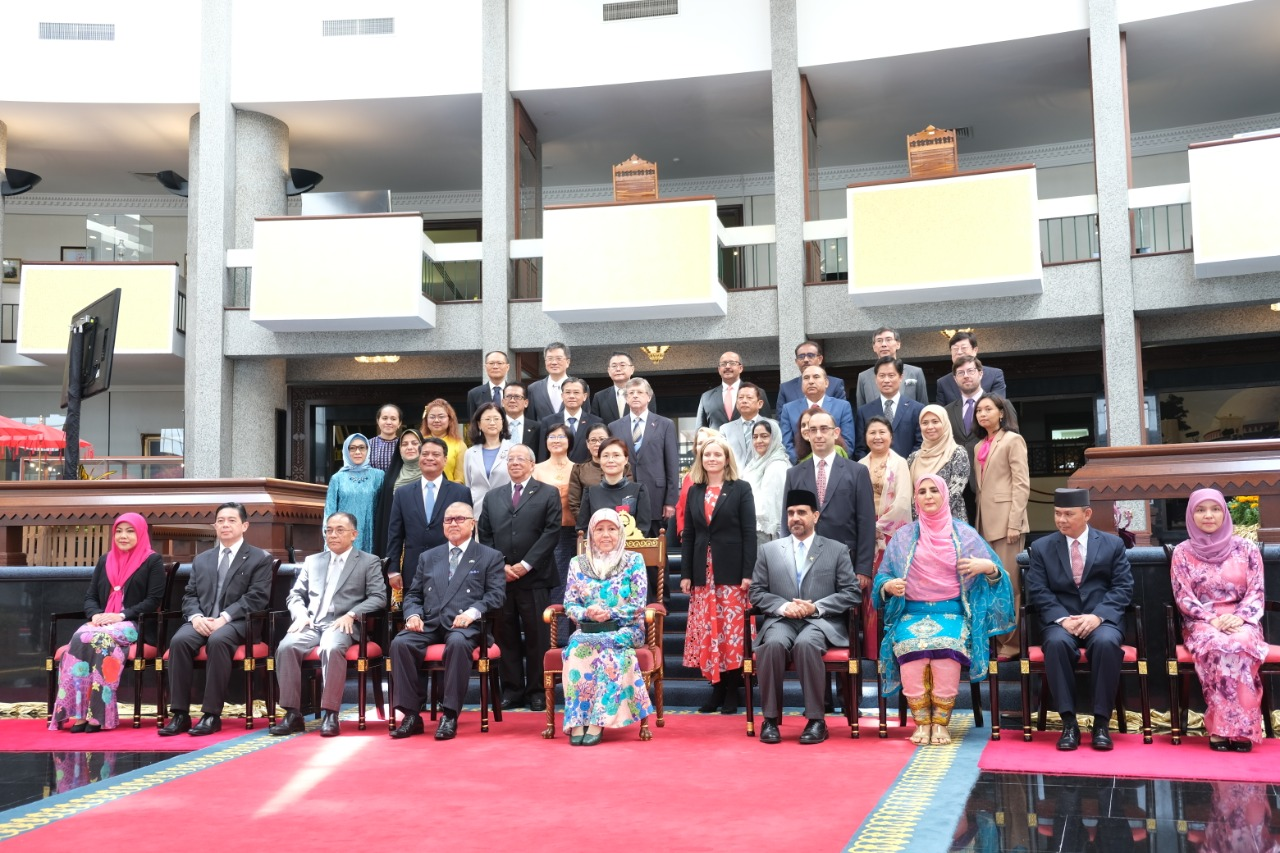
Aminuddin Ihsan and Nurhayana Janis (seated second and first from the right, respectively) at the Royal Regalia Museum in 2020

Aminuddin Ihsan is married to Nurhayana Janis binti Abdullah @ Janice Lim Liau Yan and they have three children together.

== Awards and honours ==
=== Awards ===
- 2017 Diplomat of the Year from Asia (24 April 2017)

=== Honours ===
Aminuddin Ihsan has been bestowed the following honours:

National

- Order of Paduka Keberanian Laila Terbilang First Class (DPKT; 15 July 2010) – Dato Paduka Seri
- Order of Seri Paduka Mahkota Brunei Third Class (SMB; 2003)
- Meritorious Service Medal (PJK; 2007)
- Sultan of Brunei Silver Jubilee Medal (5 October 1992)
- General Service Medal
- Long Service Medal and Good Conduct (PKLPB)
- Royal Brunei Armed Forces Golden Jubilee Medal (31 May 2011)
- Royal Brunei Armed Forces Diamond Jubilee Medal (31 May 2021)

Foreign

- Indonesia:
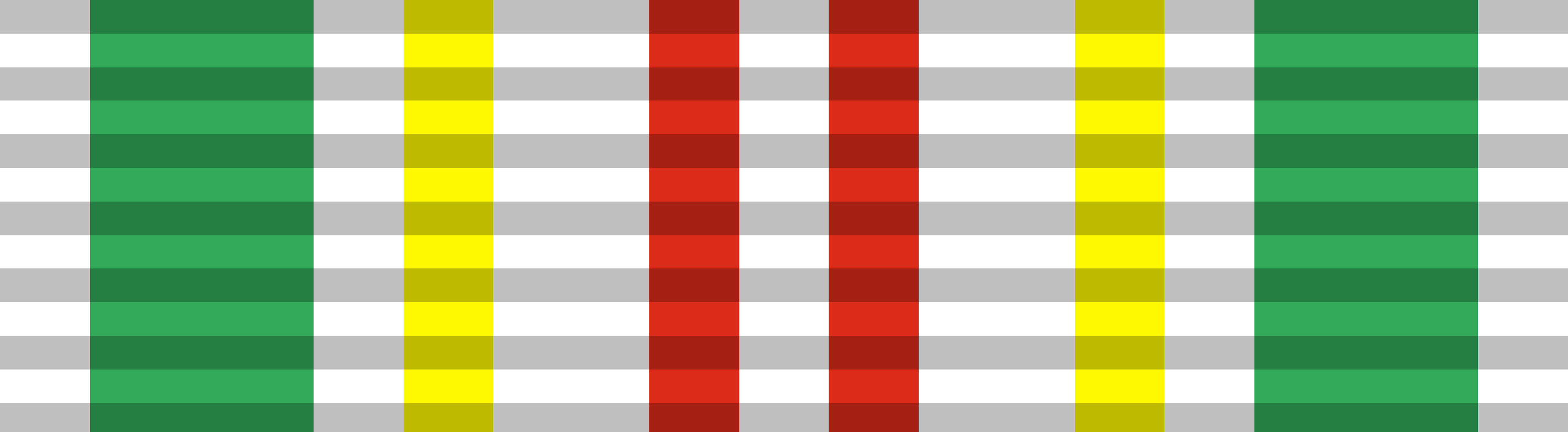
  - Bintang Yudha Dharma Utama (BYD; 22 August 2011)
- Malaysia:
  - Courageous Commander of the Order of Military Service (PGAT; 4 October 2011)
- Philippines:
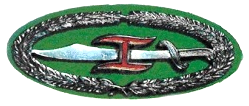
  - Combat Commander's Badge (2005)
- Singapore:
  - Pingat Jasa Gemilang (Tentera) (PJG; 9 June 2010)
  - Darjah Utama Bakti Cemerlang (Tentera) (DUBC; 12 April 2012)
- Thailand:
  - Knight Grand Cross of the Order of the Crown of Thailand (PM; 26 August 2011)

Political offices
Preceded by Halbi Mohd Yussof	8th Minister of Culture, Youth and Sports; 30 January 2018 – 7 June 2022	Succeeded by Nazmi Mohamad
Diplomatic posts
Preceded by Aziyan Abdullah	High Commissioner of Brunei to the United Kingdom; 15 May 2014 – 30 January 2018	Succeeded by Rooslina Weti
Military offices
Preceded by Halbi Yussof	8th Commander of the Royal Brunei Armed Forces; 31 December 2009 – 29 January 2014	Succeeded by Mohammad Tawih
Preceded by Rosli Chuchu	7th Commander of the Royal Brunei Land Forces; 12 December 2008 – 13 November 2009	Succeeded by Yussof Abdul Rahman
Preceded by Said Puteh	16th Commander of the Training Institute; 1 April 2007 – 26 November 2008	Succeeded by Mohammad Tawih
Preceded by Title established	Head of the 1st Brunei Darussalam International Monitoring Team; 2004–2005	Succeeded by Jol Jublee Bangkol
