= List of high commissioners of Brunei to India =

Coordinates: 28.5621936°N 77.1604626°E

High Commissioner of Brunei to India
- இந்தியாவுக்கான புருனே உயர் ஆணையர்
- Emblem of Brunei

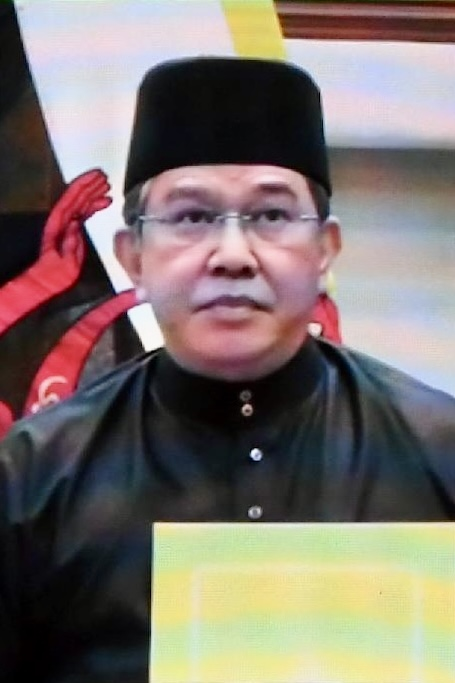
- Incumbent; Alaihuddin Taha since 22 September 2021
- Style: His Excellency
- Residence: New Delhi
- Appointer: Sultan of Brunei
- Term length: At His Majesty's pleasure
- Inaugural holder: Abdul Momin Ismail (non-resident); Adnan Buntar (resident)
- Formation: 12 August 1992
- Website: Official website

The Bruneian High Commissioner in New Delhi is the official representative of the Government in Bandar Seri Begawan to the Republic of India. Additionally, the high commission serves as the Asian-African Legal Consultative Organization's (AALCO) representative, with dual accreditation to Sri Lanka as High Commissioner and Nepal as Ambassador.

== History ==
During discussions at Commonwealth Heads of Government Meetings (CHOGM), among other events, the late Prime Minister Rajiv Gandhi and Sultan Hassanal Bolkiah expressed desire in improving bilateral relations. The Sultan made a state visit to India in September 1992 at the request of Prime Minister Gandhi, and on 18 May 1993, an Indian permanent diplomatic presence was established in Brunei. On 12 August 1992, Brunei opened its high commission in India.

== List of high commissioners ==
Diplomatic agrément/Diplomatic accreditation	High commissioner	Observations	Prime Minister of Brunei / Sultan of Brunei	President of India	Term end
1990	Pengiran Dipa Negara Laila Diraja Pengiran Haji Abdul Momin bin Pengiran Haji Ismail	Non-resident high commissioner	Hassanal Bolkiah	Ramaswamy Venkataraman	1993
8 August 1994	Dato Paduka Dr. Haji Mohd Adnan bin Buntar	An MoU on aviation services collaboration was signed by India and Brunei in January 1995. This agreement eventually developed into a bilateral air services agreement in November of the same year. For the Second Meeting of the Indo-Brunei Joint Committee, the secretary of the Ministry of External Affairs traveled to Brunei from 1–2 May 1996.	Hassanal Bolkiah	Shankar Dayal Sharma	1997
16 October 1997	Dato Seri Setia Haji Abdul Mokti bin Haji Mohd Daud	The secretary of Ministry of External Affairs visited Brunei in July 1998 for bilateral engagements on issues of mutual concern. In July 1999, Pehin Dato Abdul Aziz as well as the chairperson of the Brunei Investment Agency (BIA) traveled to India. India was visited by Princess Masna in April 2000.	Hassanal Bolkiah	K. R. Narayanan	2001
August 2001	Dato Paduka Haji Abdul Ghafar bin Haji Ismail	During the second ASEAN-India Summit in 2003, ASEAN and India signed the Framework Agreement on Comprehensive Economic Cooperation. On 2–4 March 2003, a group led by Dato Abdullah traveled to Bangalore to view Indian IT facilities. On 20 September 2004, a group of four scientists from the ISRO's TTC Center in Brunei successfully saw the Geosynchronous Satellite Launch Vehicle (GSLV) launch. In September 2006, Shakeel Ahmad traveled to Brunei to take part in the Second TELMIN + India Meeting.	Hassanal Bolkiah	K. R. Narayanan	May 2007
2008	Dato Paduka Haji Sidek bin Ali	A bilateral agreement on investment promotion and protection (BIPA) was already signed in 2008 between the two nations. Pehin Dato Yasmin paid visits to Raksha Mantri and the Minister of State for Defence while in India in 2010 and 2012 as part of the DEFEXPO displays. On 16 May 2018, the Indian Cabinet gave its approval for Brunei and India to execute an agreement on the exchange of tax information.	Hassanal Bolkiah	Pratibha Patil	2020
22 September 2021	Dato Paduka Haji Alaihuddin bin Pehin Orang Kaya Digadong Seri Lela Dato Seri Utama Haji Awang Mohd Taha	Pehin Dato Halbi was followed by Dato Alaihuddin to the 9th Asian Energy Ministerial Roundtable, India Energy Week 2023, and the Ministerial Session of the Strategic Conference.	Hassanal Bolkiah	Ram Nath Kovind	incumbent

== See also ==
- Brunei–India relations
