= List of permanent representatives of Brunei to the United Nations =

Permanent Representative of Brunei to the United Nations
- Wakil Tetap Brunei ke Pertubuhan Bangsa-Bangsa Bersatu
- Emblem of Brunei

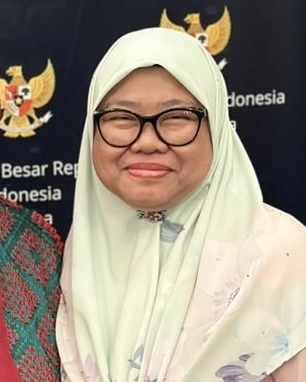
- Incumbent; Noor Qamar Sulaiman since 18 February 2019
- Ministry of Foreign Affairs; Department of International Organisations
- Style: Her Excellency
- Residence: New York City
- Appointer: Sultan of Brunei
- Term length: At His Majesty's pleasure
- Inaugural holder: Pengiran Abdul Momin
- Formation: 1994
- Website: Official website

The following are the list of Bruneian diplomats that served as Permanent Representative of Brunei Darussalam to the United Nations Headquarters in New York. The representative also have non-resident ambassadorship to Colombia, Costa Rica and Cuba.

== Background ==
Brunei joined the UN on 21 September 1984. The decision was aimed at gaining recognition for its sovereignty and full independence. Accession took place during the 39th Session of the United Nations General Assembly, with the Sultan Hassanal Bolkiah emphasising that UN membership would raise global awareness of the country's existence. Membership in the UN provided a platform for Brunei to voice its aspirations and views on international and local issues.

== List of representatives ==
Diplomatic agrément/Diplomatic accreditation	Permanent Representative	Observations	Prime Minister of Brunei	Secretary-General of the United Nations	Term end
1994	Pengiran Dipa Negara Laila Diraja Pengiran Haji Abdul Momin bin Pengiran Haji Ismail	First permanent representative to the UN in New York.	Hassanal Bolkiah	Boutros Boutros-Ghali	1995
14 February 1996	Pehin Orang Kaya Seri Dewa Major General (Retired) Dato Seri Pahlawan Haji Mohammad bin Haji Daud		Hassanal Bolkiah	Boutros Boutros-Ghali	April 1997
6 August 1997	Pengiran Dato Paduka Haji Maidin bin Pengiran Haji Hashim		Hassanal Bolkiah	Kofi Annan	1998
23 November 1998	Dato Paduka Haji Jemat bin Haji Ampal		Hassanal Bolkiah	Kofi Annan	2001
20 February 2001	Dato Paduka Haji Serbini bin Haji Ali		Hassanal Bolkiah	Kofi Annan	2002
1 October 2002	Dato Paduka Haji Shofry bin Haji Abdul Ghafor	The 2005 World Outcome Summit was adopted during the High-Level Plenary Meeting in New York from the 14 to 16 September 2005.	Hassanal Bolkiah	Kofi Annan	9 July 2005
27 April 2006	Emran bin Bahar		Hassanal Bolkiah	Kofi Annan	2008
8 October 2008	Latif bin Tuah		Hassanal Bolkiah	Ban Ki-moon	2013
28 March 2013	Dato Paduka Haji Abdul Ghafar bin Haji Ismail	On 29 September 2015, Sultan Hassanal Bolkiah and Queen Saleha attended the General Assembly of the UN’s 70th Session.	Hassanal Bolkiah	Ban Ki-moon	2019
18 February 2019	Hajah Noor Qamar binti Haji Sulaiman		Hassanal Bolkiah	António Guterres	Incumbent

== See also ==
- Foreign relations of Brunei
- Permanent representatives of Brunei to the UN in Geneva
