= Brunei–India relations =

- Brunei: India

Diplomatic mission
- High Commission of Brunei, New Delhi: High Commission of India, Bandar Seri Begawan

Envoy
- High Commissioner Alaihuddin Taha: High Commissioner Alok Amitabh Dimri

Brunei and India established diplomatic relations in 1984. Brunei has a high commission in New Delhi, and India has a high commission in Bandar Seri Begawan. Both countries are members of the Non-Aligned Movement and the Commonwealth of Nations.

== History ==
Bilateral relations between the countries were established on 10 May 1984. His Majesty Sultan Hassanal Bolkiah made a state visit to India in September 1992. Since the discovery of oil in Brunei in 1929, a number of Indians migrated to Brunei to work in the oil and allied services sectors; later, many arrived as teachers, with some of them inter-marrying with local Bruneian peoples. According to local government's official sources, there are around 10,000 Indians living in Brunei, as of 2013.

== Economic relations ==
Five memorandums of understanding were signed by both countries in May 2008, on issues such as Bilateral Investment Promotion and Protection Agreements (BIPA), Information and Communications Technology (ICT), culture, trade and space. The main export of Brunei to India is crude oil, while India has mainly exported its manpower to Brunei, both professionals and semi-skilled workers. Indian businessmen have a near monopoly in the textiles sector of Brunei, and the majority of doctors in Brunei are from India. Between 2010 and 2011, Indian exports to Brunei increased from $34.55 million to $36.77 million, and Bruneian exports to India rose from $674 million to $1266 million, which was mainly due to rise in petroleum off take by Indian petrochemical companies.
