= Brunei–Laos relations =

- Brunei: Laos

Part of the Embassy of Brunei in Vientiane

Brunei and Laos established diplomatic relations in 1993. Brunei has an embassy in Vientiane, and Laos has an embassy in Bandar Seri Begawan. Both countries co-operate in trade, education and defence.

== History ==
Relations between the two countries has been established since 27 July 1993. In 2010, President Choummaly Sayasone made a state visit to Brunei while His Majesty The Sultan of Brunei attended the 9 ASEM meeting which been held in Vientiane in 2012. Prime Minister Thongsing Thammavong also made an official visit to Brunei in 2013.

== Economic relations ==
In 1999, both countries has signed a memorandum of understanding on the establishment of a Joint Commission for Bilateral Cooperation (JCBC). While a MoU on sports co-operation been signed in 2013. Both countries also in the process to setting up a barter trade agreement where both countries can exchange their locally produced products in accordance with the needs of the two countries.
