= Pengiran Maidin =

Bruneian diplomat (born 1951)

Dato Paduka Pengiran Maidin DPMB PJK PIKB PKL
- محي الدين

High Commissioner of Brunei to the United Kingdom
- In office 7 June 2006 – 2010
- Preceded by: Yunus Mahmud
- Succeeded by: Aziyan Abdullah

Permanent Representative of Brunei to the United Nations
- In office 6 August 1997 – 1998
- Preceded by: Mohammad Daud
- Succeeded by: Jemat Ampal

Ambassador of Brunei to Germany
- In office September 1994 – 1997
- Succeeded by: Mahadi Wasli

Personal details
- Born: 13 March 1951 (age 75) Brunei
- Education: Fletcher School of Law and Diplomacy (MA); Oxford University; Hull University (BSc)
- Occupation: Diplomat; civil servant

Pengiran Maidin bin Pengiran Haji Hashim (born 13 March 1951) is a retired Bruneian diplomat who formerly held the position of permanent representative of Brunei to the United Nations from 1997 to 1998, high commissioner to the United Kingdom from 2006 to 2010, and ambassador to Germany in 1994.

== Education ==
At Tufts University in the United States' Fletcher School of Law and Diplomacy, Pengiran Maidin graduated with a Master of Arts (MA) in 1990. A Bachelor of Science (BSc) in economics from Hull University in 1976 and a certificate in diplomacy from Oxford University in the United Kingdom in 1984.

== Diplomatic career ==
Pengiran Maidin started his work at the government's Economic Planning Unit in 1976 as an administrative officer. Later, beginning in 1977, he was the Tutong District Assistant District Officer for Brunei. He had worked his way up to become deputy controller in the Royal Customs and Excise Department by 1982; he had served in that capacity since 1979.

Pengiran Maidin had several important roles in the Brunei Foreign Ministry (MFA). From August 1992 to September 1994, he was the Foreign Minister's private secretary. He has had a number of positions in the ministry, such as director of the Political Department (1990–1992) and director general of the ASEAN Department (1986– 1989).

Since September 1994 he has represented his nation as an ambassador to Germany; since September 1996, he has also represented his country as a non-resident ambassador to the Russian Federation. On 6 August 1997 Pengiran Maidin, the newly appointed permanent representative of Brunei Darussalam to the United Nations, gave Secretary-General Kofi Annan his letters of credence. He was well-suited for his new role because to his vast experience and academic background. Upon completing his tenure in 1998, he served as the permanent secretary at the Ministry of Finance and later chair of the Public Service Commission (PSC).

Sultan Hassanal Bolkiah gave his permission on 8 March 2006, to hand over credentials to Pengiran Maidin the recently appointed Brunei high commissioner to the United Kingdom.

== Personal life ==
Pengiran Maidin was born on 13 March 1951. He is married and has five kids.

== Honours ==
Pengiran Maidin has earned the following honours;

- Order of Seri Paduka Mahkota Brunei Second Class (DPMB) – Dato Paduka
- Order of Setia Negara Brunei Third Class (SNB)
- Meritorious Service Medal (PJK)
- Excellent Service Medal (PIKB)
- Long Service Medal (PKL)

Diplomatic posts
Preceded by Yunus Mahmud	High Commissioner of Brunei to the United Kingdom; 7 June 2006 – 2010	Succeeded by Aziyan Abdullah
Preceded by Mohammad Daud	Permanent Representative of Brunei to the United Nations; 6 August 1997 – 1998	Succeeded by Jemat Ampal
Preceded by –	Ambassador of Brunei to Germany; September 1994 – 1997	Succeeded by Mahadi Wasli
