= Brunei–Vietnam relations =

- Brunei: Vietnam

Brunei and Vietnam established diplomatic relations in 1992. Brunei has an embassy in Hanoi, and Vietnam has an embassy in Bandar Seri Begawan. Relations between the two countries have always been friendly especially in the political field.

== History ==
Relations between the two countries has been established since 29 February 1992. In 1998, His Majesty Hassanal Bolkiah paid an official visit to Vietnam while in 2001, President Tran Duc Luong paid an official visit to Brunei.

== Economic relations ==
Several agreements such as agreement on aviation has been signed by both countries. The two-way trade volume reached about U$1.5–2 million per year. In 2005, the trade volume was U$4.5 million. By the end of June 2007, Brunei had 37 investment projects in Vietnam with a total capital of U$125.8 million, ranking 29th among 74 countries and territories investing in Vietnam. While in 2012, Brunei ranked 12th among 94 foreign investors in Vietnam with US$48.5 billion poured into 124 projects. Brunei also annually grants the Vietnamese many scholarships for training in the fields of oil and gas engineering and English courses.

== Security relations ==
There is also co-operation between the navies of both countries in maintaining peace, stability and maritime security in the region.

== See also ==
- Foreign relations of Brunei
- Foreign relations of Vietnam
