= Brunei–Singapore relations =

- Brunei: Singapore

Diplomatic mission
- High Commission: High Commission

Envoy
- High Commissioner Noor Qamar Sulaiman: High Commissioner Lim Hong Huai

Brunei and Singapore established diplomatic relations in 1984. Brunei has a high commission in Singapore, and Singapore has a high commission in Bandar Seri Begawan. Brunei and Singapore have close and friendly relations with extensive defence co-operation. Both countries are members of ASEAN and Commonwealth of Nations.

== History ==
The official relations between the two countries were established on 1 January 1984. In 2012, His Majesty the Sultan of Brunei Hassanal Bolkiah attended the 3rd Singapore Airshow and met the then Prime Minister Lee Hsien Loong and the former Prime Minister Lee Kuan Yew, while Teo Chee Hean visited Brunei the same year.

== Economic and monetary relations ==
Several memoranda of understanding have been signed and there is a Currency Interchangeability Agreement between the two countries which makes both Brunei dollar and Singapore dollar banknotes and coins legal tender in either country.

== Security relations ==
The Singapore Armed Forces (SAF) has trained many Bruneian soldiers for a period of time. As compensation, Brunei granted the Singapore Armed Forces to build a permanent jungle training camp in Temburong, named Lakiun Camp and officially opened in 1977. Brunei and Singapore began Exercise Airguard in 1994, which involves joint training between the Royal Brunei Air Force and the Republic of Singapore Air Force, with the states alternating as hosts. The Republic of Singapore Navy also hosts exercises with Royal Brunei Navy every year named Exercise Pelican. Besides, the Singapore Police Force also deployed to Brunei to conduct Exercise Solar Wind. This exercise was jointly conducted by the Singapore Police Force (SPF) and the Royal Brunei Police Force (RBPF), supported by HTX (Home Team Science and Technology Agency). Some highly trained police officers from both forces continue to sharpen their post-blast investigation skills and hone their working relationship with their foreign counterparts. The joint training exercise is also an important platform for SPF to reinforce our strong training ties and relationship with the Royal Bruneian Police Force. The exercises usually involve around 70 personnel from both nations.

On 8 October 2026, Singapore Prime Minister Lawrence Wong visited Brunei to mark 50 years of defence ties between the two nations.
