= Masurai Masri =

Bruneian diplomat (born 1965)

- ماسوراي مسري
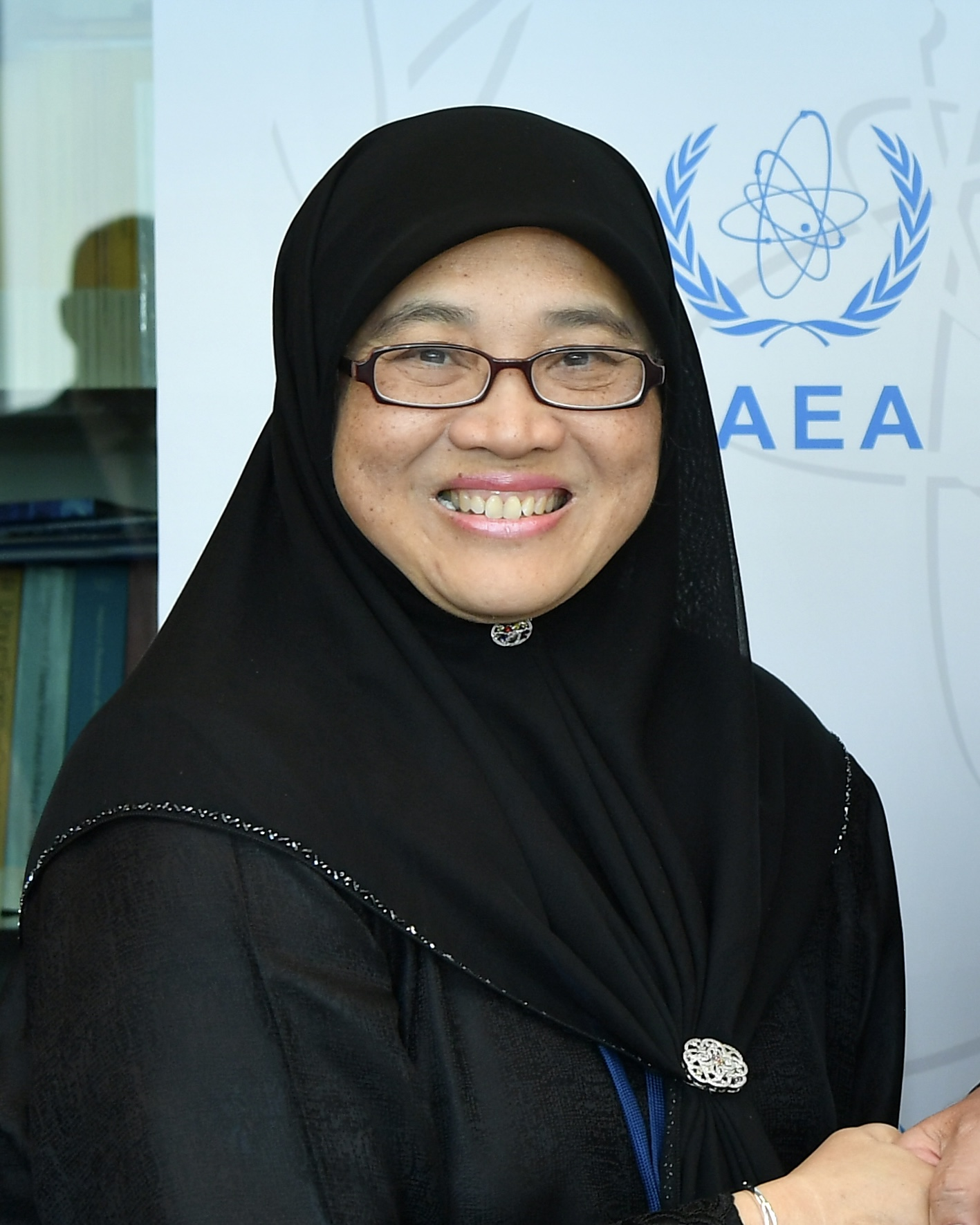
- Masurai in 2019

Permanent Representative of Brunei to the United Nations in Geneva
- In office 15 January 2019 – 22 September 2020
- Preceded by: Mahdi Abdul Rahman
- Succeeded by: Dayangku Mazlizah

High Commissioner of Brunei to Bangladesh
- In office 4 September 2016 – 2019
- Preceded by: Pengiran Abdul Haris
- Succeeded by: Haris Othman

Personal details
- Born: 26 May 1965 (age 61) Brunei
- Education: Universiti Brunei Darussalam
- Occupation: Diplomat

Hajah Masurai binti Haji Masri (born 26 May 1965) is a Bruneian diplomat who became the permanent representative to the United Nations (UN) from 2019 to 2020, and high commissioner to Bangladesh from 2016 to 2019.

== Education ==
Masurai attended Universiti Brunei Darussalam (UBD) from 1985 to 1989, for her bachelor's degree in management studies.

== Diplomatic career ==
Masurai began working for the Ministry of Foreign Affairs and Trade (MOFAT) in 1989. She held a number of positions over her career, including first secretary at the Brunei Darussalam High Commission in Canberra, Australia from December 2004 to July 2006; Deputy Head of Mission at the High Commission in Canberra from July 2006 to December 2007; and Second Secretary at the Brunei Darussalam High Commission in London, England, from October 1995 to October 1998.

She worked for the MOFAT from January 2013 to August 2016 as a Senior Special Duties Officer in the Technical Assistance Division and from December 2007 to January 2013 as the Deputy Head of the Department of International Organisations.

On 11 August 2016, Masurai was appointed as the high commissioner to Bangladesh. On the 13th, Sultan Hassanal Bolkiah awarded her the certificate of appointment as high commissioner to Bangladesh. She officially succeeded Pengiran Abdul Haris as Brunei's high commissioner to Bangladesh on 4 September 2016. From January to June 2017, she became the chairman of ASEAN Dhaka Commettee (ADC).

On 2 January 2019, the departing envoy met President Abdul Hamid at Bangabhaban in the city. According to Joynal Abedin, the President expressed gratitude to Masurai for concluding their terms in Bangladesh with success. Additionally, he expressed gratitude to the people for backing Bangladesh in various international fora pertaining to the Rohingya crisis.

On 16 January 2019, Prince Al-Muhtadee Billah held separate audiences with recently appointed Brunei Darussalam envoys. The audience featured the Permanent Representative of Brunei Darussalam to the United Nations in Geneva, Masurai. On 14 February, Michael Møller, the director-general of the United Nations Office at Geneva, received her credentials from Masurai, the newly appointed Permanent Representative of Brunei Darussalam. Haris Othman, her replacement, was only named high commissioner to Bangladesh on 14 April.

On 19 July, as Brunei Darussalam's new resident representative to the IAEA, she gave Mikhail Chudakov a presentation of her credentials at the organization's Vienna, Austria headquarters.

== Personal life ==
Masurai is married and together they have three children.

Political offices
Preceded by Mahdi Abdul Rahman	Permanent Representative of Brunei to the United Nations in Geneva; 15 January 2019 – 22 September 2020	Succeeded by Dayangku Mazlizah
Preceded by Pengiran Abdul Haris	High Commissioner of Brunei to Bangladesh; 4 September 2016 – 2019	Succeeded by Haris Othman
