= List of permanent representatives of Brunei to the United Nations in Geneva =

Permanent Representative of Brunei to the United Nations in Geneva
- Wakil Tetap Brunei ke Pertubuhan Bangsa-Bangsa Bersatu di Geneva
- Emblem of Brunei

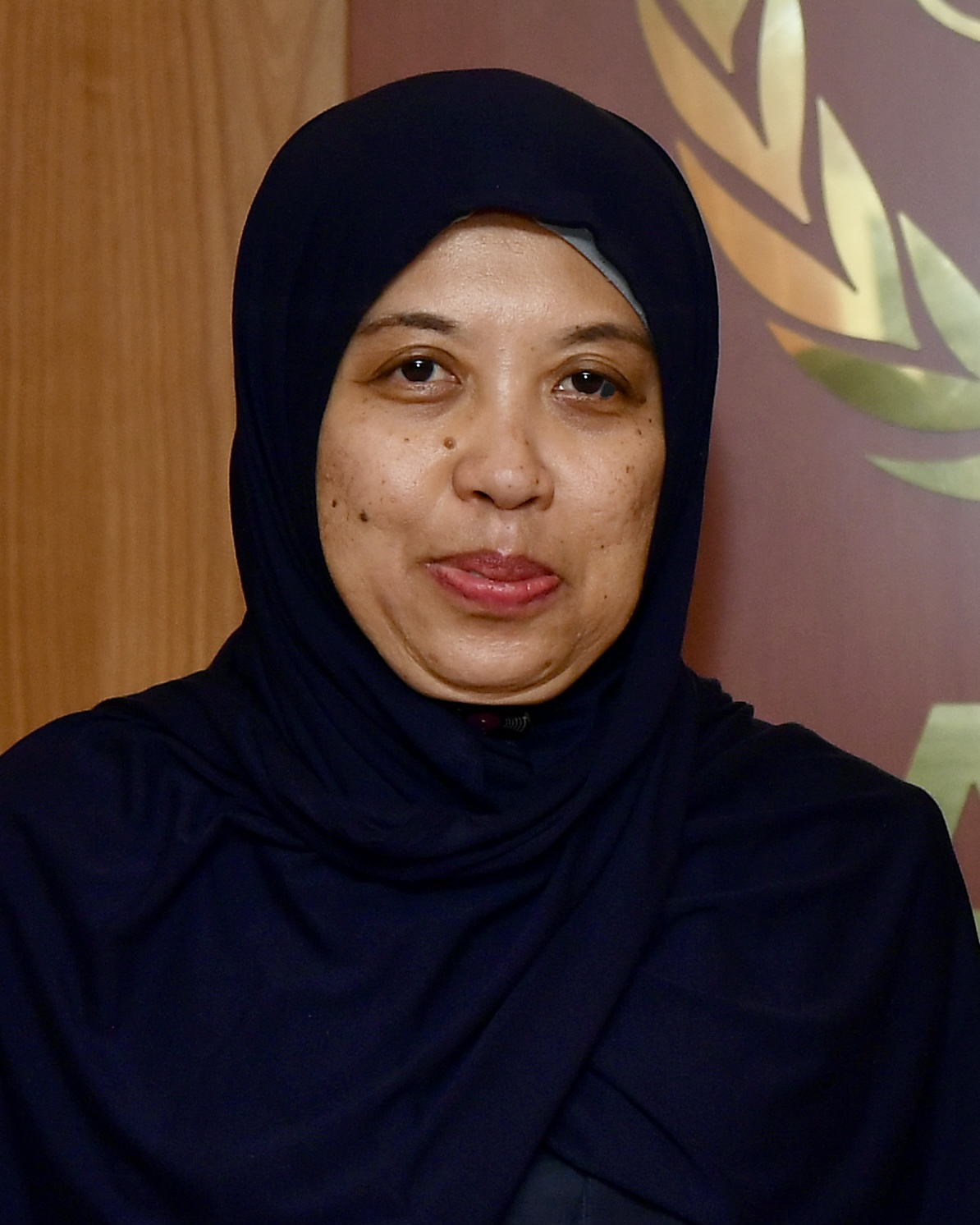
- Incumbent; Dayangku Mazlizah since 22 September 2020
- Ministry of Foreign Affairs; Department of International Organisations
- Style: Her Excellency
- Residence: Geneva
- Appointer: Sultan of Brunei
- Term length: At His Majesty's pleasure
- Inaugural holder: Pengiran Idris
- Formation: 1999
- Website: Official website

The following is the list of Bruneian diplomats that served as Permanent Representative of Brunei Darussalam to the United Nations (UN) Office in Geneva, World Trade Organization, and International Atomic Energy Agency.

== Background ==
Brunei joined the UN on 21 September 1984. The decision was aimed at gaining recognition for its sovereignty and full independence. Accession took place during the 39th Session of the United Nations General Assembly, with the Sultan Hassanal Bolkiah emphasising that UN membership would raise global awareness of the country's existence. Membership in the UN provided a platform for Brunei to voice its aspirations and views on international and local issues.

== List of representatives ==
Diplomatic agrément/Diplomatic accreditation	Permanent Representative	Observations	Prime Minister of Brunei	Director-General of the United Nations Office at Geneva	Term end
1999	Pengiran Dato Paduka Haji Idris bin Duli Pengiran Temenggong Pengiran Haji Mohammad	First permanent representative to the UN in Geneva.	Hassanal Bolkiah	Vladimir Petrovsky	2000
2000	Pengiran Dato Paduka Haji Sallehuddin bin Pengiran Haji Yusuf		Hassanal Bolkiah	Vladimir Petrovsky	2001
2001	Dato Paduka Haji Mohammad Hamid bin Haji Mohammad Jaafar		Hassanal Bolkiah	Vladimir Petrovsky	2002
28 August 2003	Dato Paduka Haji Mahadi bin Haji Wasli		Hassanal Bolkiah	Sergei Ordzhonikidze	July 2007
July 2007	Dato Paduka Haji Alaihuddin bin Pehin Orang Kaya Digadong Seri Lela Dato Seri Utama Haji Awang Mohd Taha		Hassanal Bolkiah	Sergei Ordzhonikidze	15 April 2008
15 April 2008	Dato Paduka Mohd Janin bin Erih	Dian Triansyah Djani complimented Janin for providing an update on the Indonesian government's attempts to enhance and protect human rights in Brunei during the 13th session of the Human Rights Council in 2010.	Hassanal Bolkiah	Sergei Ordzhonikidze	22 October 2011
22 October 2011	Pengiran Kasmirhan bin Pengiran Haji Tahir		Hassanal Bolkiah	Kassym-Jomart Tokayev	29 November 2012
29 November 2012	Abu Sufian bin Haji Ali		Hassanal Bolkiah	Kassym-Jomart Tokayev	25 November 2014
25 November 2014	Dato Paduka Haji Mohd Mahdi bin Pehin Orang Kaya Digadong Seri Diraja Dato Laila Utama Haji Awang Abdul Rahman		Hassanal Bolkiah	Michael Møller	15 January 2019
15 January 2019	Hajah Masurai binti Haji Masri		Hassanal Bolkiah	Michael Møller	22 September 2020
22 September 2020	Dayangku Hajah Mazlizah binti Pengiran Haji Mahalee		Hassanal Bolkiah	Tatiana Valovaya	Incumbent

== See also ==
- Foreign relations of Brunei
- Permanent representatives of Brunei to the UN in New York
