= Elhadj As Sy =

Senegalese humanitarian aid expert (born 1958)

Elhadj As Sy (born 1958 ) is a Senegalese humanitarian aid expert who served as the Secretary General of the International Federation of Red Cross and Red Crescent Societies (IFRC) from 2014 until 2019.

== Education ==
Sy studied Arts and Human Sciences at the University of Dakar. He then pursued Master’s studies in Arts and Germanistik at the University of Graz, and graduated from the Diplomatic Academy of Vienna. He was also awarded a post graduate diploma in Education from the École normale supérieure in Dakar.

Sy speaks English, French and German. He currently resides in Geneva.

== Career ==
From 1988 to 1997, Sy served as Director of Health and Development Programmes with Environment and Development Action in the Third World in Dakar, Senegal. He later worked with The Global Fund to Fight AIDS, Tuberculosis and Malaria as its Africa Regional Director and as Director of Operational Partnerships and Country Support in Geneva. Mr. Sy has also held the position of UNAIDS Representative in New York and Director of the New York Liaison Office.

From 2005 to 2008, Sy was Director, HIV/AIDS Practice with the United Nations Development Programme in New York City and, before joining the IFRC in 2014, he worked as Director of Partnerships and Resource Development for UNICEF. He has also served as UNICEF Regional Director for Eastern and Southern Africa and Global Emergency Coordinator for the Horn of Africa.

Sy is a member of the Independent Oversight and Advisory Committee for the WHO Health Emergencies Programme. In January 2016, he was appointed by United Nations Secretary-General Ban Ki-moon to the High-level Advisory Group for Every Woman Every Child. In response to the West African Ebola virus epidemic, Ban also appointed him to the Global Health Crises Task Force in 2016 for a period of one year; the group was jointly chaired by Jan Eliasson, Jim Yong Kim, Margaret Chan and Helen Clark. From 2018 to 2022, he co-chaired (alongside Gro Harlem Brundtland) the joint World Bank/WHO Global Preparedness Monitoring Board (GPMB). On 16 October 2024, Sy was appointed as the first Chancellor of the Liverpool School of Tropical Medicine.

== Other activities ==
=== Corporate boards ===
- Volkswagen, Member of the Sustainability Council (since 2016)

=== Non-profit organizations ===
- Interpeace, Member of the Governing Board (since 2020)
- UNAIDS, Member of the Advisory Group (since 2020)
- Wellcome Trust, Member of the Board of Governors (since 2020)
- World Health Summit, Co-Chair of the Council (since 2020)
- Kofi Annan Foundation, Chair of the Board (since 2019)
- International Gender Champions (IGC), Member
- RBM Partnership To End Malaria, Member of the Board
