= Brunei–Timor-Leste relations =

- Brunei: Timor-Leste

Diplomatic mission
- Embassy: Embassy

Envoy
- Ambassador Wan Hadfi Lutfan: Ambassador Abel Guterres

Brunei–Timor-Leste relations refer to foreign relations between Brunei and Timor-Leste. Diplomatic relations were established in 2002 after Timor-Leste was granted independence.

== Diplomatic missions ==
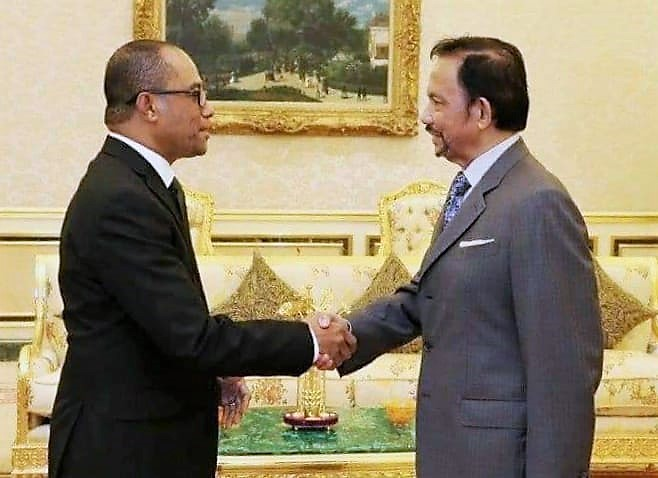
Timor-Leste's Foreign Minister Dionísio Babo visits Sultan Hassanal Bolkiah of Brunei (2019)

Timor-Leste's first ambassador to Brunei, Roberto Soares, was still based in Singapore from 2009. Marçal Avelino Ximenes was appointed the first East Timorese ambassador based in Brunei in 2016.

Brunei has maintained an embassy in Dili since 2015. Brunei's first ambassador to Timor-Leste was Paduka Hj Abdul Salam Momin until 2016.

== Economy ==
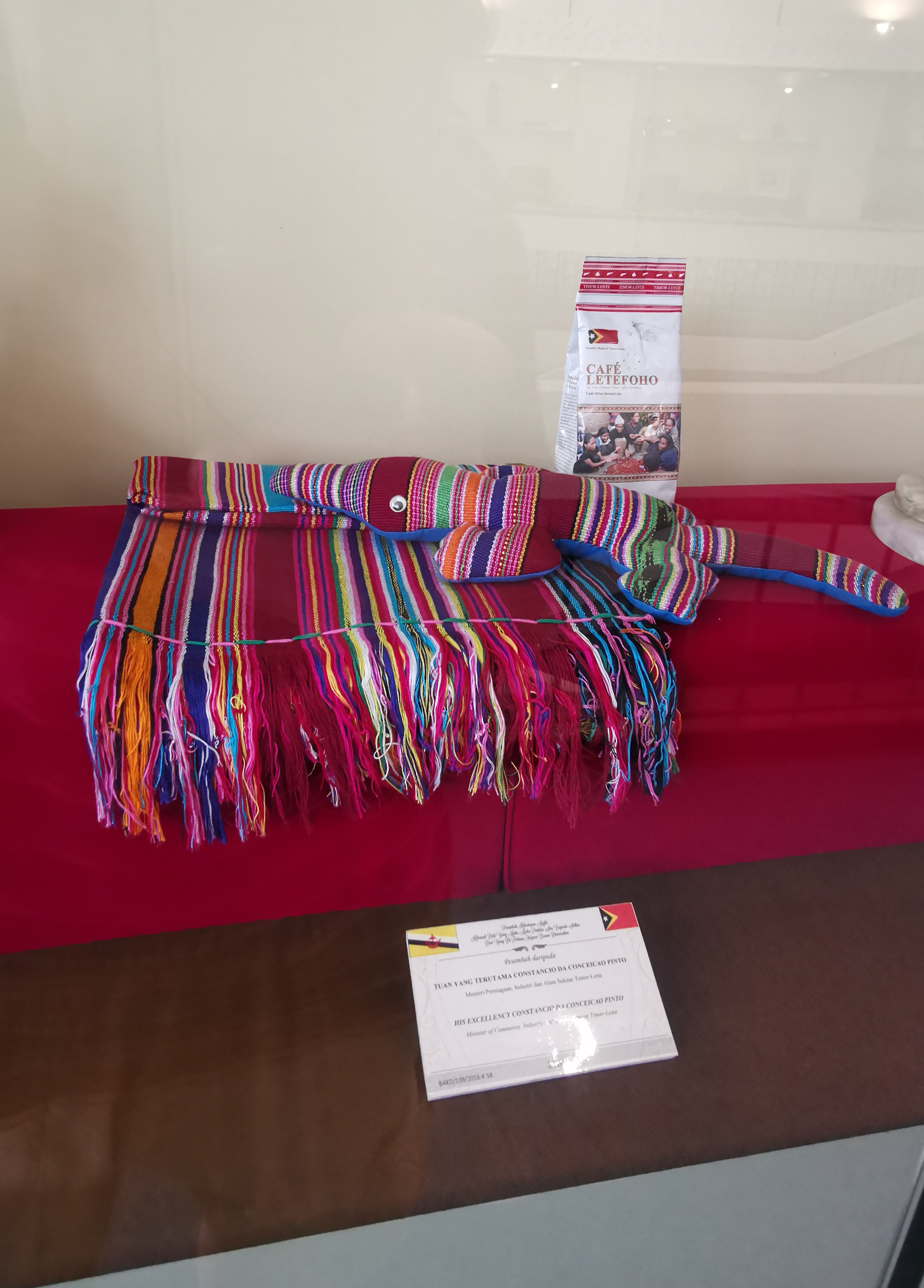
Gift from the East Timorese Minister of Trade during his visit to the Sultan of Brunei (displayed at the Royal Regalia Museum)

Brunei and Timor-Leste are members of ASEAN. Both countries generate the majority of their gross domestic product from oil revenues. Brunei is counting on opportunities in the import of Halāl foodstuffs in Timor-Leste. The sultanate would like to sell poultry from farms in Darwin, Australia, to Timor-Leste. This food would be of interest to Muslim tourists, for example. Brunei could also help Timor-Leste with the vocational training of its population, for example with scholarships for students at schools in Brunei. Brunei's canned fish industry could expand to Timor-Leste.

In June 2017, there is only one businessman from Brunei operating in Timor-Leste. He is one of the main suppliers of oxygen for medical and industrial purposes.

For 2018, the Statistical Office of Timor-Leste registered the import of components for prefabricated houses from Brunei worth US$5,436.
