= Jocklin Kongpaw =

2nd Commander of the Royal Brunei Air Force, and Bruneian diplomat

Colonel (Retired) Dato Seri Laila Jasa Jocklin Kongpaw DSLJ PANB PHBS PIKB
- جوچكلين كوڠڤاو
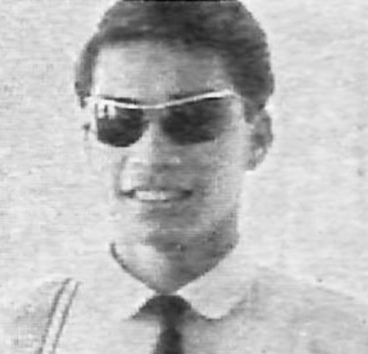
- Jocklin in 1966

Commander of the Air Wing, Royal Brunei Malay Regiment
- In office 27 March 1986 – 1990
- Monarch: Hassanal Bolkiah
- Preceded by: Pengiran Abidin
- Succeeded by: Office abolished
Diplomatic positions
High Commissioner of Brunei to Canada
In office 10 January 1998 – 2001
Succeeded by	Magdalene Teo
High Commissioner of Brunei to Australia
In office 2001–2004
Preceded by	Malai Ahmad Murad
Succeeded by	Adnan Mohd Ja'afar

Personal details
- Born: 12 November 1944 Tutong, Brunei
- Died: 21 April 2025 (aged 80) Brunei
- Spouse: Meliah binti Lungkau
- Occupation: Military officer; diplomat

Military service
- Allegiance: Brunei
- Branch/service: Royal Brunei Air Force
- Years of service: 1965–1996
- Rank: Colonel
- Commands: Air Wing RBMR; Director of Personnel

Jocklin bin Kongpaw (12 November 1944 – 21 April 2025) was a Bruneian military officer and diplomat who became the high commissioner to Canada from 1998 to 2001, and Australia from 2001 to 2004.

Being one of the first military pilots in the Royal Brunei Air Force (RBAirF), he and Pengiran Abidin had indirectly aided the expansion and development of the RBAirF.

== Military career ==
Junior Lieutenants Abidin and Jocklin completed a two-month Royal Air Force (RAF) Air Crew Selection training at RAF Biggin Hill, Westerham in England, and returned to Brunei on 11 September 1966. After completing all domestic and foreign flight training, two local officers, Second Lieutenants Abidin and Jocklin were given the pilot badge for the first time by Sultan Hassanal Bolkiah on 6 August 1968, marking a very significant moment for the Royal Brunei Malay Regiment (RBMR). This event is also remembered by the AMDB as the first in the history of the organisation for having produced two successful local military pilots. The presentation ceremony was further enhanced at that time by a flight display at Istana Darul Hana that utilised a Bell 206B helicopter. The two pilots from the area had shown a very high level of skill and effectiveness.

RBMR created history on 14 August 1967, when the two pilots were sent to British Executive Air Services Limited at Kidlington in Oxfordshire, England, for basic flight training. Before going to training in the United Kingdom, the two officers also completed flying school in Sabah, Malaysia, to obtain a pilot's license. After completing basic training, the two pilots underwent ninety hours of advanced flight training on a Bell 206B helicopter under the supervision of Major Herbert Marshall, the commander of the Helicopter Platoon, RBMR. Both pilots have subsequently flown a range of RBAirF aircraft in various capacities and have served as officers.

Colonel Jocklin was also the second indigenous officer to be appointed the Air Branch, RBMR's commander on 27 March 1986, succeeding Lieutenant Colonel Abidin. After being advanced to the rank of Colonel in 1990, he assumed the position of Director of Membership and Administration within the Ministry of Defence. From 4 January 1994 to 31 January 1996, he was appointed the Director of Personnel. He spent 31 years working for the ABDB.

== Diplomatic career ==
On 10 January 1998, he was presented his credentials by the Sultan, as the high commissioner to Canada until 2001. He would be reappointed the high commissioner to Australia from 2001 to 2004.

== Family ==
Colonel (Retired) Dato Seri Laila Jasa Jocklin was married to Datin Meliah binti Lungkau and blessed with 4 children.

== Death ==
Colonel (Retired) Dato Seri Laila Jasa Jocklin died on Monday morning, 21 April 2025 at his home in Brunei Darussalam. He was buried in Kampung Bukit Udal, Brunei Darussalam.

== Honours ==
A road within the Royal Brunei Air Force Base, Rimba was named Jocklin Drive on 22 April 2022. Examples of honours awarded to him;

- Order of Paduka Seri Laila Jasa Second Class (DSLJ) – Dato Seri Laila Jasa
- Order of Perwira Agong Negara Brunei First Class (PANB)
- Sultan Hassanal Bolkiah Medal (PHBS)
- Excellent Service Medal (PIKB)
- Sultan of Brunei Silver Jubilee Medal (5 October 1992)
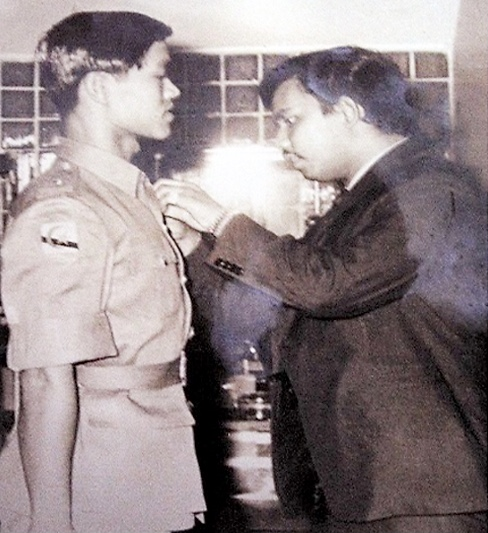
  Junior lieutenant Jocklin being awarded his pilot badge by Sultan Hassanal Bolkiah in 1968
- Royal Brunei Armed Forces Silver Jubilee Medal (31 May 1986)
- General Service Medal

Diplomatic posts
Preceded by —	High Commissioner of Brunei to Canada; 10 January 1998 – 2000	Succeeded by Magdalene Teo
Preceded by Malai Ahmad Murad	High Commissioner of Brunei to Australia; 2001 – 2003	Succeeded by Adnan Mohd Ja'afar
