= Julia Imene-Chanduru =

Namibian diplomat (born 1979)

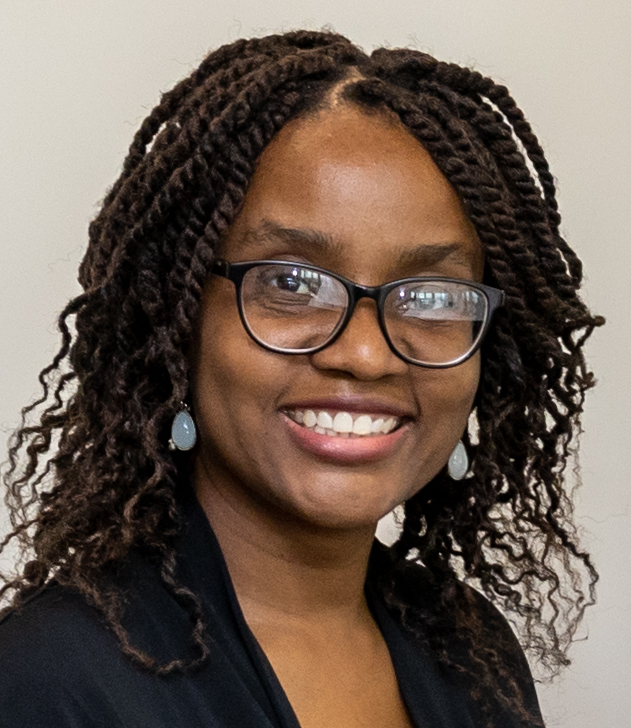
- Imene-Chanduru in 2022

Permanent Representative of Namibia to the United Nations Office in Geneva
- Incumbent
- Assumed office January 2021

Personal details
- Born: 10 September 1979 (age 47) Namibia
- Education: University of Namibia; American University

Julia Imene-Chanduru (born 10 September 1979) is a Namibian diplomat. She has served as Deputy Permanent Representative of Namibia to the United Nations in New York and as Permanent Representative of Namibia to the United Nations Office in Geneva.

== Biography ==
Imene-Chanduru was born on 10 September 1979. She achieved a bachelor's degree in economics from the University of Namibia in 2005, then studied towards a master's degree in international service from the American University in Washington D.C., United States.

Imene-Chanduru joined the Ministry of Foreign Affairs of Namibia in 2004. She was First Secretary at the Embassy of Namibia in Washington, D.C. from January 2007 to December 2011.

Imene-Chanduru served as Counsellor and Deputy Permanent Representative of Namibia to the United Nations in New York from December 2018 to November 2020. In January 2021, she was appointed as Permanent Representative of Namibia to the United Nations Office at Geneva and Ambassador to Switzerland, presenting her credentials to Director General Tatiana Valovaya.

In 2021, Imene-Chanduru represented the Chair of the Joint United Nations Programme on HIV/AIDS (UNAIDS) Programme Coordinating Board. In 2023, Imene-Chanduru was appointed as President of the Government Group of the UN International Labour Organization (ILO).

In 2024, Imene-Chanduru chaired the Geneva Support Group for the Protection and Promotion of Human Rights in the Western Sahara. She also presented on negotiations on the Pact for the Future to the United Nations Summit of the Future at the South Centre and Transnational Institute (TNI).

In 2024, Imene-Chanduru was sued by a former employee in the United States. She continued to work as a diplomat. In 2025, Imene-Chanduru spoke at the 66th Session of the World Intellectual Property Organisation (WIPO) General Assemblies, negotiating on copyright and calling for the adoption of an international legal instrument on limitations and exceptions for libraries, research, museums, educational institutions, and archives, in order to improve access to knowledge across Africa.

In August 2025, Imene-Chanduru deposited the instruments for ratifications to the International Labour Organisation (ILO) Convention No. 156 on workers with family responsibilities.

Imene-Chanduru has supported the International Gender Champions pledges against gender-based violence and for gender parity.
