= Adnan Mohd Ja'afar =

Bruneian diplomat

His Excellency Adnan Mohd Ja'afar
- عدنان محمد جعفر
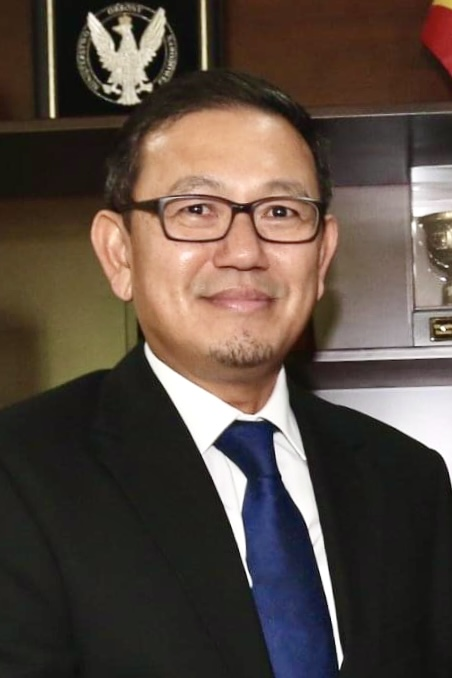
- Ambassador Adnan in 2019

Ambassador of Brunei to Belgium
- Incumbent
- Assumed office 20 April 2022
- Preceded by: Abu Sufian Ali

Ambassador of Brunei to East Timor
- In office 28 February 2019 – 16 November 2020
- Preceded by: Norazlianah Ibrahim
- Succeeded by: Wan Hadfi Lutfan

High Commissioner of Brunei to Australia
- In office 2008–2008
- Preceded by: Jocklin Kongpaw
- Succeeded by: Sharip Othman

Personal details
- Born: Brunei
- Occupation: Diplomat

Adnan bin Haji Mohd Ja'afar is a diplomat from Brunei who is the incumbent ambassador to Belgium since 2022, East Timor from 2019 to 2020, and high commissioner to Australia in 2008. Additionally, he is also representative to the Organisation for the Prohibition of Chemical Weapons (OPCW) since 2022.

== Diplomatic career ==
On 29 October 2008, Sultan Hassanal Bolkiah handed over Adnan's letter of credentials, amid his appointment as the new high commissioner to Australia. He previously served as Director of the Department of International Organizations at the Ministry of Foreign Affairs and Trade and as Deputy Permanent Representative at Brunei Darussalam's Permanent Mission to the United Nations in New York.

After being appointed as the new ambassador to East Timor, on 15 January 2019, Adnan again received his letter of credentials at the Istana Nurul Iman. Adaljiza Magno's remarks at the farewell reception on 16 November 2020 noted that Ambassador Adnan has strongly advocated for Timor-Leste's ASEAN membership since its inception.

On 8 March 2021, Sultan Hassanal Bolkiah handed over Adnan's letter of credentials, which would officially be handed over to King Willem-Alexander on 20 April 2022. On the same day, he handed over his credentials to the OPCW. As the non-resident ambassador to Luxembourg, he presented his credentials to Grand Duke Henri on 16 March 2022. At the same time, he was the non-resident ambassador to Hungary.

== Personal life ==
Dayangku Salina Binti Pengiran Haji Alli is Adnan's wife.

Diplomatic posts
Preceded by Abu Sufian Ali	Ambassador of Brunei to Belgium; 20 April 2022 – present	Succeeded by Incumbent
Preceded by Norazlianah Ibrahim	Ambassador of Brunei to East Timor; 28 February 2019 – 17 November 2020	Succeeded by Wan Hadfi Lutfan
Preceded by Jocklin Kongpaw	High Commissioner of Brunei to Australia; 2008–2008	Succeeded by Sharip Othman
