= Abu Sufian Ali =

Bruneian diplomat (born 1966)

Abu Sufian Ali PSB SMB
- ابو سفيان علي
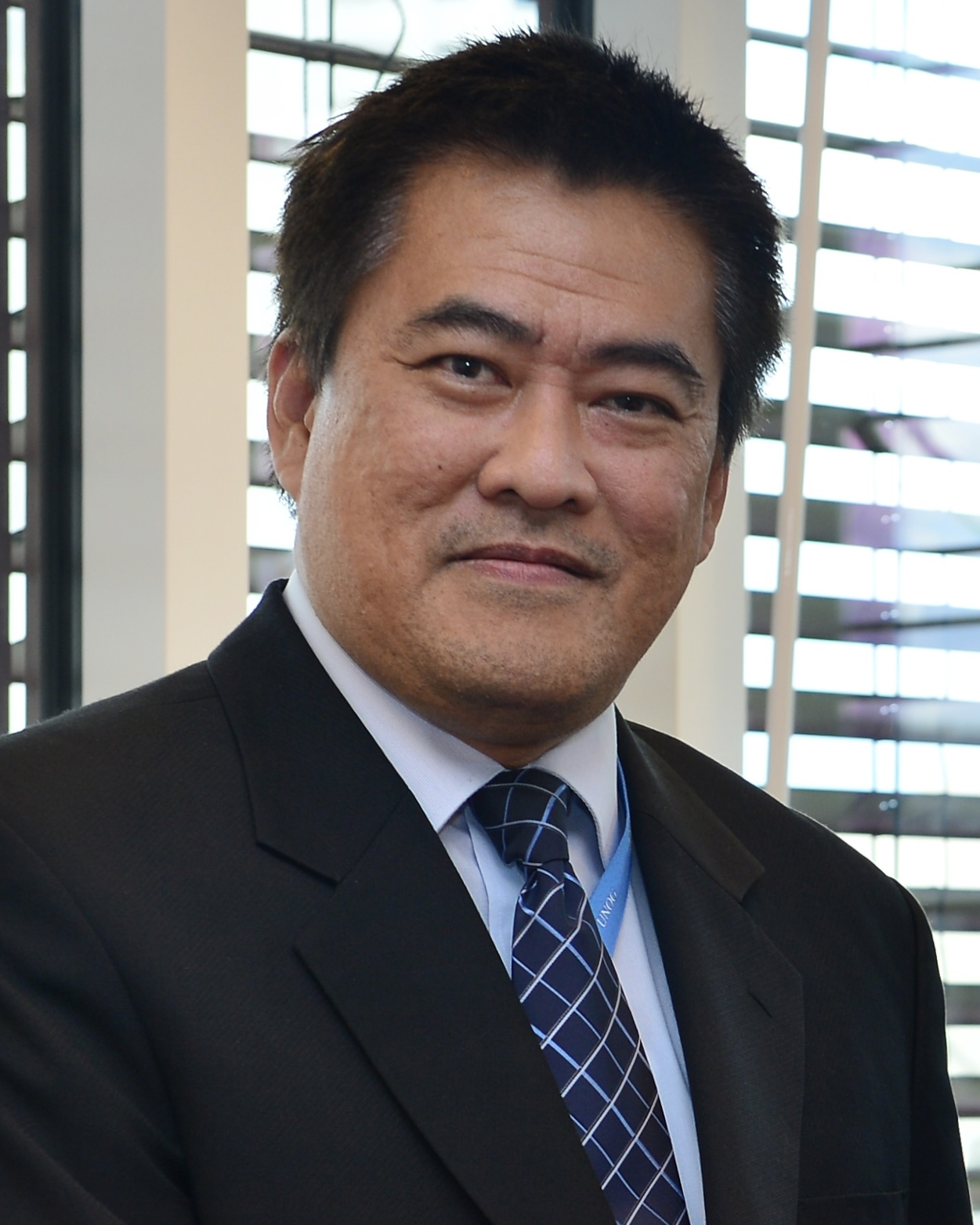
- Abu Sufian in 2013

Ambassador of Brunei to Belgium
- In office 22 February 2017 – 2021
- Preceded by: Serbini Ali
- Succeeded by: Adnan Mohd Ja'afar

Permanent Representative of Brunei to the United Nations in Geneva
- In office 29 November 2012 – 25 November 2014
- Preceded by: Kasmirhan Tahir
- Succeeded by: Mahdi Abdul Rahman

Personal details
- Born: 23 March 1966 (age 60) Kuala Belait, Belait, Brunei
- Spouse: Anisamawati Osman
- Education: Staffordshire Polytechnic (BA)
- Occupation: Diplomat

Abu Sufian bin Haji Ali (born 23 March 1966) is a Brunei diplomat who became the ambassador to Belgium from 2017 to 2021, and the permanent representative to the United Nations (UN) in Geneva.

== Education ==
Abu Sufian received his Bachelor of Arts in international relations from Staffordshire Polytechnic in the United Kingdom in 1990. Additionally, he has attended several courses, including the 7th Annual Young Professional Conference in San Francisco, the 7th Special Training on WTO Dispute Settlement and Practices in Geneva, a Programme on Preventive Diplomacy and Conflict Resolution in Washington, D.C, and an Executive Development Programme at the Ministry of Defence.

== Diplomatic career ==
From 1990 to 1994, Abu Sufian served as a researcher at the Department of Economy within the Ministry of Foreign Affairs. Subsequently, in 1994–1995, he continued his research role at the China and ASEAN Department of Political Affairs within the same ministry. His diplomatic assignments include being a Second Secretary at the Brunei Permanent Mission to the UN and other international organisations, including the World Trade Organization (WTO) in Geneva, from 1995 to 1998. Following this, he held the position of First Secretary at the same mission from 1998 to 2000.

From 2000 to 2001, Abu Sufian took on the role of chargé d'affaires. He served as the Deputy Director of the Policy Planning Department at the Ministry of Foreign Affairs from 2001 to 2004. In 2004–2005, he held the position of Deputy Director of the Department of International Organisation, followed by his role as Deputy Director of the Department of Multilateral Economy from 2005 to 2008. During 2006–2007, he temporarily assumed the role of Acting Director of the Department of International Trade.

His involvement in international negotiations includes being a member of the Brunei delegation for the Brunei-Japan Economic Partnership Agreement (BJEPA) from 2006 to 2008. During these negotiations, he served as Co-Chair of the Group on Improving the Business Environment and the Chapter on Cooperation. Simultaneously, he played a significant role in BJEPA energy negotiations. In the period of 2006–2009, he served as the chief negotiator for Brunei on the ASEAN-India Free Trade Agreement. From 2008 to 2012, he finally was promoted to the position of Director of the Department of International Trade.

Additionally, from 2008 to 2012, he was part of the delegation negotiating an agreement between Brunei, ASEAN, Australia, and New Zealand on free trade. He played a key role in the final negotiations for the creation of the Free trade agreement (FTA) and assumed the role of co-chair of the Committee on Commodities Trade under the ASEAN-Australia-New Zealand (AANZ) FTA during the early stages of its implementation.

=== United Nations ===
Not long after being presented his letter of credential on 29 November 2012, Abu Sufian was approved by Prince Al-Muhtadee Billah for a meeting with him at Qashr Al-Meezaan on 8 December. Later on the 20th, he submits his credentials to Kassym-Jomart Tokayev. From 5 July 2013, he obtained non-resident ambassadorship to Ukraine. Concurrently, he held the important positions of permanent representative to the Comprehensive Nuclear-Test-Ban Treaty (CTB) and International Atomic Energy Agency (IAEA) in Vienna. On 19 September 2013, he met IAEA Director General Yukiya Amano bilaterally during the IAEA's 57th General Conference in Vienna.

=== Belgium ===
Transitioning to his role in defence, from 2014 to 2016, he served as the Deputy Permanent Secretary with a focus on Defense Policy and Development at the Ministry of Defense. After being appointed as the new ambassador to Belgium, Abu Sufian received his new letter of credential from Sultan Hassanal Bolkiah at Istana Nurul Iman on 13 August 2016. At this capacity, he would hold accredations to Benelux countries, the European Union (EU), the Organisation for the Prohibition of Chemical Weapons (OPCW), Hungary, Sweden, and Denmark. He would also on 22 February 2017, present his credentials to King Willem-Alexander at the Noordeinde Palace. Additionally, he replaced Serbini Ali as the new Head of Mission of Brunei to the European Union. In 2017, he was also the chairman ASEAN Brussels Committee. During his tenure, he saw the Sultan's visit to Brussels to attend the 12th Asia-Europe Summit Meeting in October 2018.

== Personal life ==
Abu Sufian was born in Kuala Belait on 23 March 1966, married to Anisamawati Osman and together they have three children. His hobbies included playing golf, jogging, badminton and football.

== Honours ==
Throughout his career, he has earned the following honours;

- Order of Setia Negara Brunei Fourth Class (PSB; 15 July 2006)
- Order of Seri Paduka Mahkota Brunei Third Class (SMB; 15 July 2010)
- Excellent Service Medal (PIKB)
- Long Service Medal (PKL)

Diplomatic posts
Preceded by Serbini Ali	Ambassador of Brunei to Belgium; 22 February 2017 – 2021	Succeeded by Adnan Mohd Ja'afar
Preceded by Kasmirhan Tahir	Permanent Representative of Brunei to the United Nations in Geneva; 29 November 2012 – 25 November 2014	Succeeded by Mahdi Abdul Rahman
