= Wan Hadfi Lutfan =

Bruneian diplomat

His Excellency Wan Hadfi Lutfan
- وان حدفي لطفان
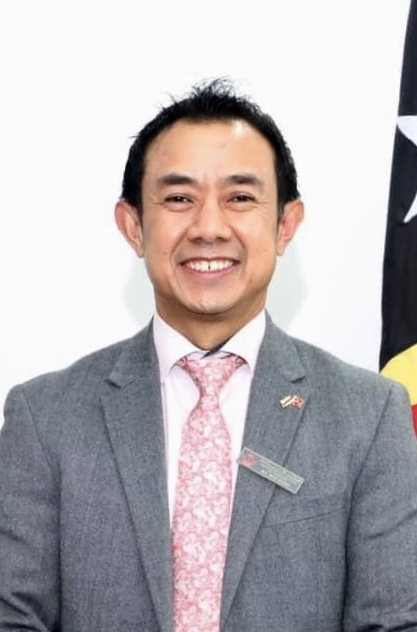
- Wan Hadfi Lutfan in 2022

Ambassador of Brunei to East Timor
- In office 15 July 2022 – 30 May 2025
- Preceded by: Adnan Mohd Ja'afar

Personal details
- Born: Brunei
- Occupation: Diplomat

Wan Hadfi Lutfan bin Haji Abdul Latif is a Bruneian diplomat who has served as the ambassador to East Timor since 2022.

== Diplomatic career ==
=== Ministry of Foreign Affairs ===
Ardasher Qodiri met virtually with Wan Hadfi Lutfan, Director of the Department of Asia-Africa of Brunei Darussalam's Ministry of Foreign Affairs on 30 April 2022. The main topic of discussion was the impending Second High-Level International Conference on the International Decade for Action "Water for Sustainable Development" (2018-2028), which will take place in Dushanbe on 6–9 June 2022.

=== East Timor ===
On the 24 May 2022, Wan Hadfi Lutfan was presented his letter of credentials by Sultan Hassanal Bolkiah at Istana Nurul Iman. On the following day, Prince Al-Muhtadee Billah agreed to meet several newly appointed envoys, including him. He would present his letter of credentials to President José Ramos-Horta on 15 July.

Wan Hadfi Lutfan visited the President of the National Council of Islam in Timor–Leste (CONISTIL) in Dili on 14 September 2022, to discuss the position of Timorese Muslims in Timor-Leste. He vowed to inform the Brunei government of the Muslim Authority in Timor-Leste's desire to assist the East Timorese Muslim economy and company in order to strengthen their economy and contribute to the country's economic progress.

Ágio Pereira welcomed Wan Hadfi Latif on 28 September 2023, to deepen and broaden connections of friendship and collaboration between the two nations. He also emphasised the parallels between Brunei and Timor-Leste, noting that both are small and the youngest ASEAN member states. Furthermore, he added both countries' reliance on the gas and oil industries, as well as their determination to diversifying their economies.

Diplomatic posts
Preceded by Adnan Mohd Ja'afar	Ambassador of Brunei to East Timor; 15 July 2022 – present	Succeeded by Incumbent
