= Dayangku Mazlizah =

Bruneian civil servant and diplomat

Her Excellency Dayangku Mazlizah
- دايڠكو مذليزاه
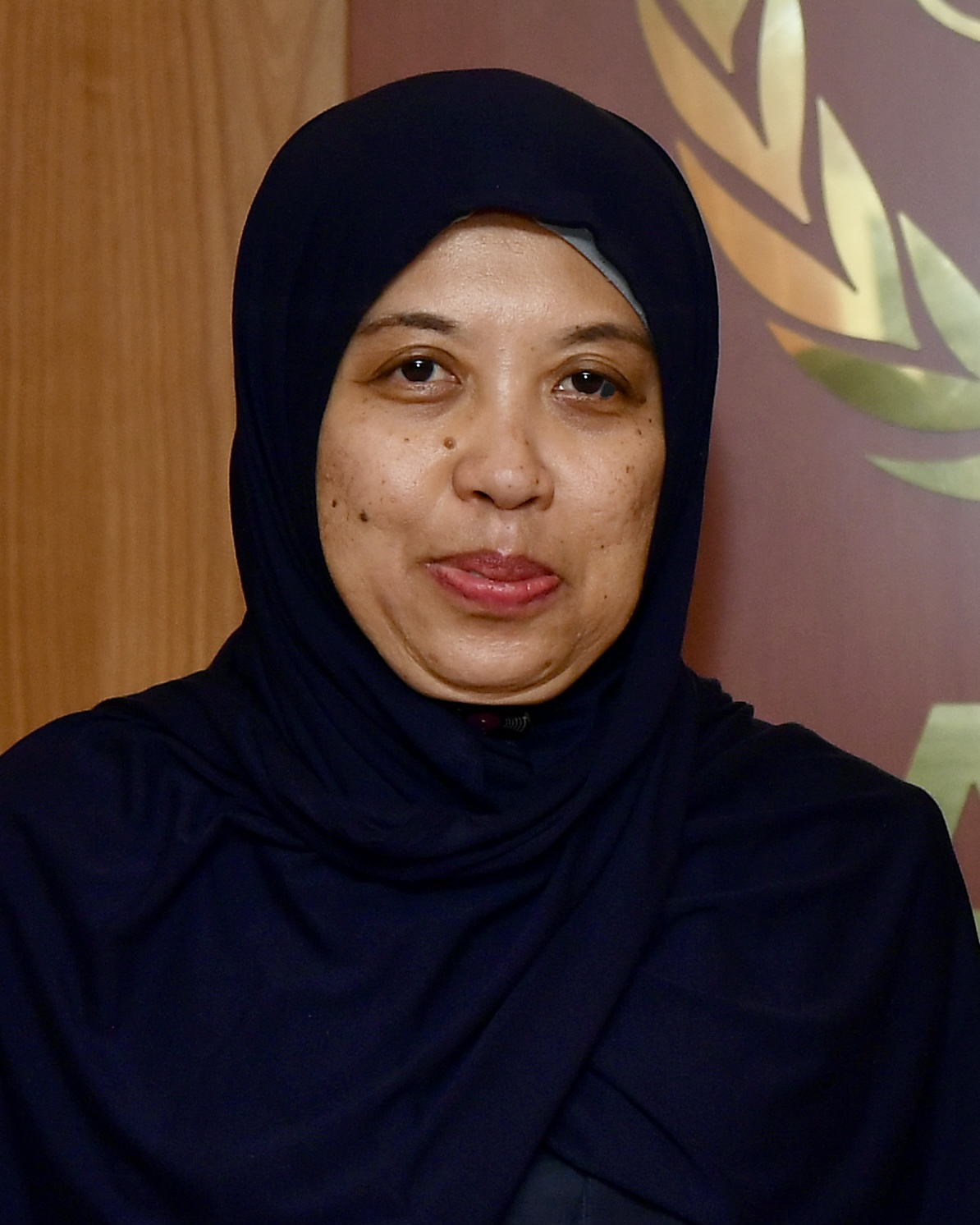
- Dayangku Mazlizah in 2020

Permanent Representative of Brunei to the United Nations in Geneva
- Incumbent
- Assumed office 22 September 2020
- Preceded by: Masurai Masri

Personal details
- Born: Brunei
- Occupation: Diplomat

Dayangku Mazlizah is a Bruneian civil servant and diplomat who became the permanent representative to the United Nations (UN) since 2020.

== Diplomatic career ==
The Public Service Department has been notified that, as of 29 June 2015, Sultan Hassanal Bolkiah has granted approval for Dayangku Mazlizah, the deputy director of the Ministry of Foreign Affairs and Trade (MOFAT), to be promoted to the position of Director of International Trade.

On 13 June 2020, at Qashr Al-Meezaan, Prince Al-Muhtadee Billah had separate audiences with the recently appointed foreign envoys to Brunei Darussalam and the newly appointed Brunei Darussalam envoys, including Dayangku Mazlizah. On Tuesday, 22 September, she gave Lassina Zerbo of the Comprehensive Nuclear-Test-Ban Treaty Organization her credentials. Three days later, she arrives to the Agency Headquarters in Vienna, Austria, and was greeted by Rafael Mariano Grossi. Lê Thị Tuyết Mai gave Mazlizah the ASEAN Committee in Geneva Chairmanship at the conclusion of a meeting on 14 December. She was among the delegation from Brunei attending the World Health Assembly from 21 to 30 May 2023.

Political offices
Preceded by Masurai Masri	Permanent Representative of Brunei to the United Nations in Geneva; 22 September 2020 – present	Succeeded by Incumbent
