= Kofi Annan Foundation =

Swiss nonprofit organization

- Founded: 2007; 19 years ago
- Founder: Kofi Annan
- Type: NGO
- Location: Geneva
- Chair of the board: Elhadj As Sy
- Executive director: Corinne Momal-Vanian
- Website: kofiannanfoundation.org

The Kofi Annan Foundation is an independent, not-for-profit organisation whose mission is to help build peaceful, democratic and resilient societies. It was founded and legally incorporated in Switzerland in 2007 by Kofi Annan, former secretary general of the United Nations.

Kofi Annan believed that "there can be no long-term development without security and no long-term security without development. Nor will any society remain prosperous for long without the rule of law and respect for human rights". Accordingly, the Kofi Annan Foundation believes that fair and peaceful societies rest on three pillars: Peace and Security, Sustainable Development and Human Rights and the Rule of Law, and they have made it their mission to mobilise the leadership and the political resolve needed to tackle threats to these three pillars ranging from violent conflict to flawed elections and climate change, with the aim of achieving a fairer, more peaceful world.

== Board members ==
The Foundation is made up of 10 board members:

- Elhadj As Sy, Secretary General of the International Federation of Red Cross and Red Crescent Societies (IFRC)
- Kojo Annan, Entrepreneur and Investor
- Bernard Mensah, Bank of America President of the UK and Central Eastern Europe, the Middle East and Africa (CEEMEA) and co-head of Global Fixed Income, Currencies and Commodities (FICC) Trading.
- Michael Møller, former under-secretary-general of the United Nations and the 12th director-general of the United Nations Office at Geneva.
- Ghassan Salamé, Lebanese academic, politician and diplomat.
- Samson Itodo, Samson is a lawyer from Nigeria and Founder of Yiaga Africa, an NGO whose mission is to promote democracy in Africa.
- John Nagulendran, Business leader, lawyer, philanthropist.
- Neha Sanghrajka, Negotiator, mediator, and author
- Ivan Pictet, Former Senior Partner of Swiss multinational private bank Pictet & Cie and former President of Fondation pour Genève.
- Nane Annan, Board Member Emerita, nutrition advocate, artist, and former lawyer

== Principles ==
The Kofi Annan Foundation presses for peaceful and equitable solutions to critical global issues through mediation, political mentoring, advocacy and advice. Their core work areas are 1) youth and peace, 2) elections and democracy and 3) international cooperation.

The Kofi Annan Foundation:

- brings experts together to address global challenges,
- facilitates transitions to peace and promote dialogue and reconciliation to build trust,
- puts forward recommendations to governments, civil society and business to protect democracy,
- creates and select initiatives that promote Kofi Annan's values.

== Activities ==
The Kofi Annan Foundation works closely with partners from international and regional organizations, foundations, universities and civil society. They channel expertise, convene all stakeholders around the table and forge coalitions of trusted influence that can make change happen.

=== Promoting Youth Leadership ===
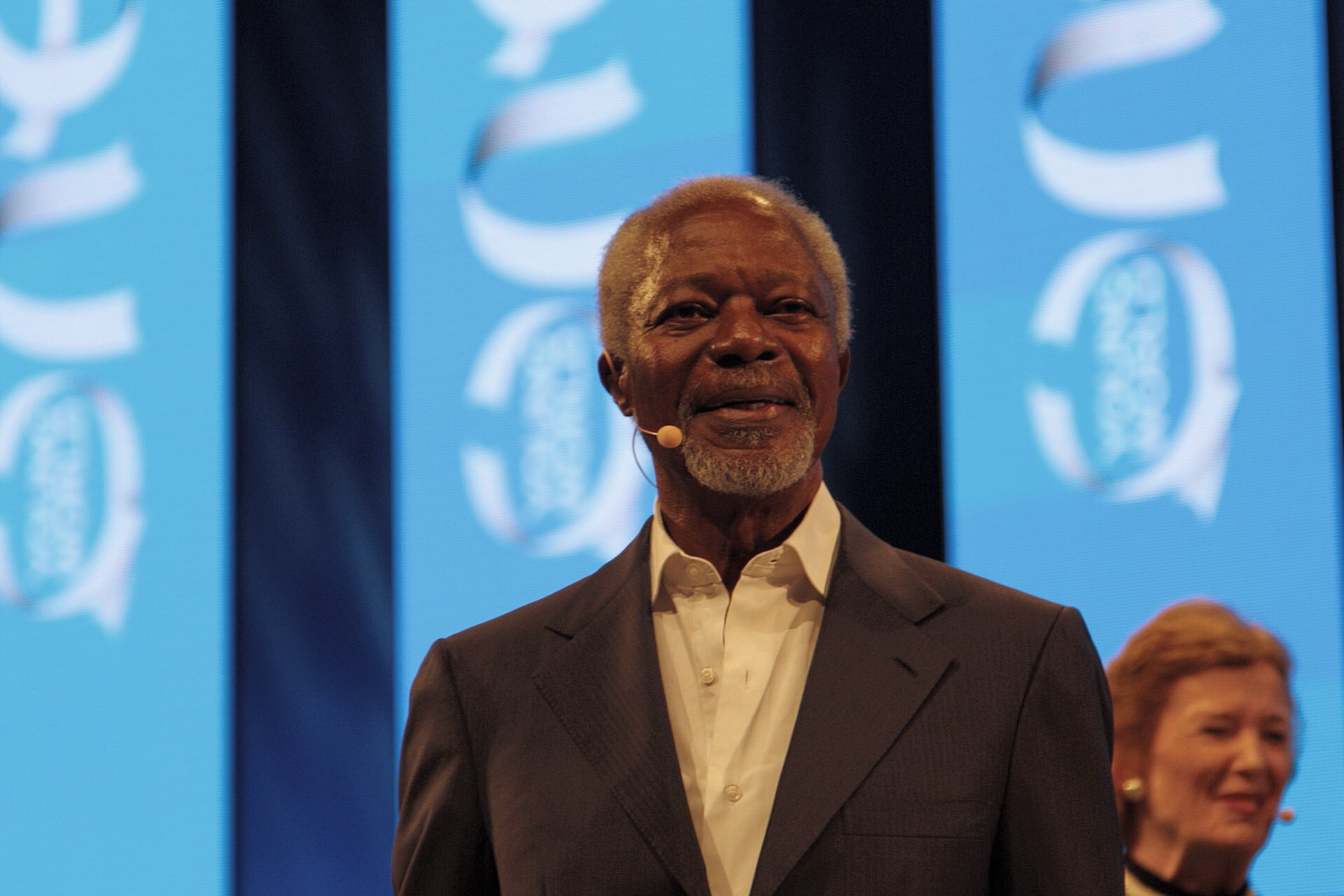
Kofi Annan at the 2014 One Young World Conference

The Kofi Annan said that "young people today are truly citizens of the world. Whatever they are working on, whatever their ambitions for the years ahead, they have to think globally – even when they act locally. Sadly, young people are often overlooked during discussions and decision-making at the national and international level. They have the power to make choices, step forward and take a role in leadership and advocacy. We must listen to the future leaders of the world and empower them to bring about real and necessary change".

One of the Foundation's main focus is fostering dialogue and leadership amongst young people by offering a platform for their ideas and proposed solutions to major public issues. Kofi Annan has been a long time supporter of One Young World, an organisation that provides opportunities for young adults to join in a global network of socially committed people with leadership potential, and was a Counsellor at the inaugural Summit in 2010 and in 2012 in Pittsburgh. In 2013, the Kofi Annan Foundation launched a series of dialogues with youth from the four corners of the world called The Kofi Annan Dialogues: LIVE, on the topics of young people, leadership, unemployment, democracy and elections, and young peoples' priorities for the post 2015 development agenda.

In 2023, Kofi Annan launched the Kofi Annan NextGen Democracy Prize, with the goal of recognizing and supporting prominent youth activists who had advanced democracy in some way. The first winner was the Zimbabwean human rights activist Namatai Kwekweza.

=== Elections and Democracy ===
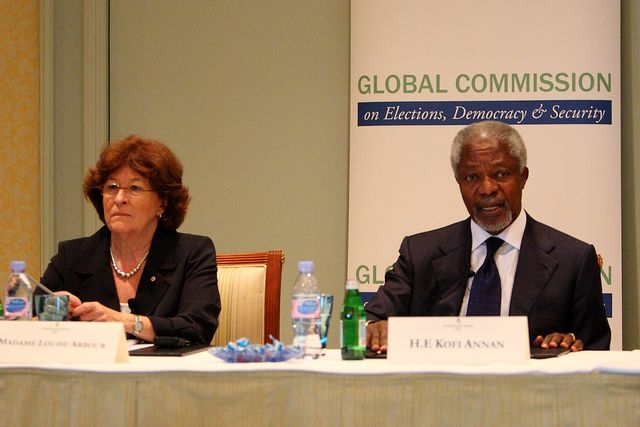
Kofi Annan and Louise Arbour at the 2012 launch of the report

The Foundation advises countries on how to strengthen the integrity and legitimacy of their electoral processes and avoid elections related violence. This builds on the work of the Global Commission on Elections, Democracy and Security, a commission jointly created by the Kofi Annan Foundation and the International Institute for Democracy and Electoral Assistance (International IDEA) which aims to highlight the importance of the integrity of elections to achieving a more secure, prosperous and stable world. Indeed, Kofi Annan is quoted as saying that "uncontrolled, unregulated and opaque political finance has also compromised the equal opportunities of citizens to influence political outcomes, leading to voter apathy and distrust. In many countries, elections continue to be associated with a 'winner-takes-all' approach, fuelling the potential for conflict and violence. At the same time, elections have been used to perpetuate the rule of dictators by giving a veneer of democratic legitimacy to autocratic regimes" and these concerns are what led him to convene a group of experts and distinguished former leaders to explore how to promote and protect the integrity of elections".

In 2012, the Commission launched its report entitled Deepening Democracy: a Strategy for Improving the Integrity of Elections Worldwide which addresses challenges to electoral integrity and distills recommendations to governments, regional and international organisations, electoral management bodies and civil society to enhance the integrity of electoral processes. In the foreword to the report, Kofi Annan is quoted as saying that "elections are the indispensable root of democracy. They are now almost universal. Since 2000, all but 11 countries have held national elections. But to be credible, we need to see high standards before, during and after votes are cast".

In 2015, Kofi Annan said that "supporting the integrity of elections in Africa and elsewhere will be an area, like all these challenges, I and my Foundation sees as particular priorities this year".

In April 2024, The Kofi Annan Commission on Food Security (KACFS) was launched to confront the challenges of food insecurity and hunger. Comprising seven global leaders in food security and governance, the KACFS created a roadmap to address these systemic failures and redefine how the multilateral world can address one of humanity’s most pressing challenges. In February 2025, the Kofi Annan Foundation released the final report from the Kofi Annan Commission on Food Security.

== Funding ==
The Kofi Annan Foundation is an independent not-for-profit foundation funded by a mix of public and private donors. The Foundation takes particular care to ensure that funding sources are beyond reproach and that contributions are politically untied.
