= Norazlianah Ibrahim =

Brunei diplomat

- نورازلينه إبراهيم
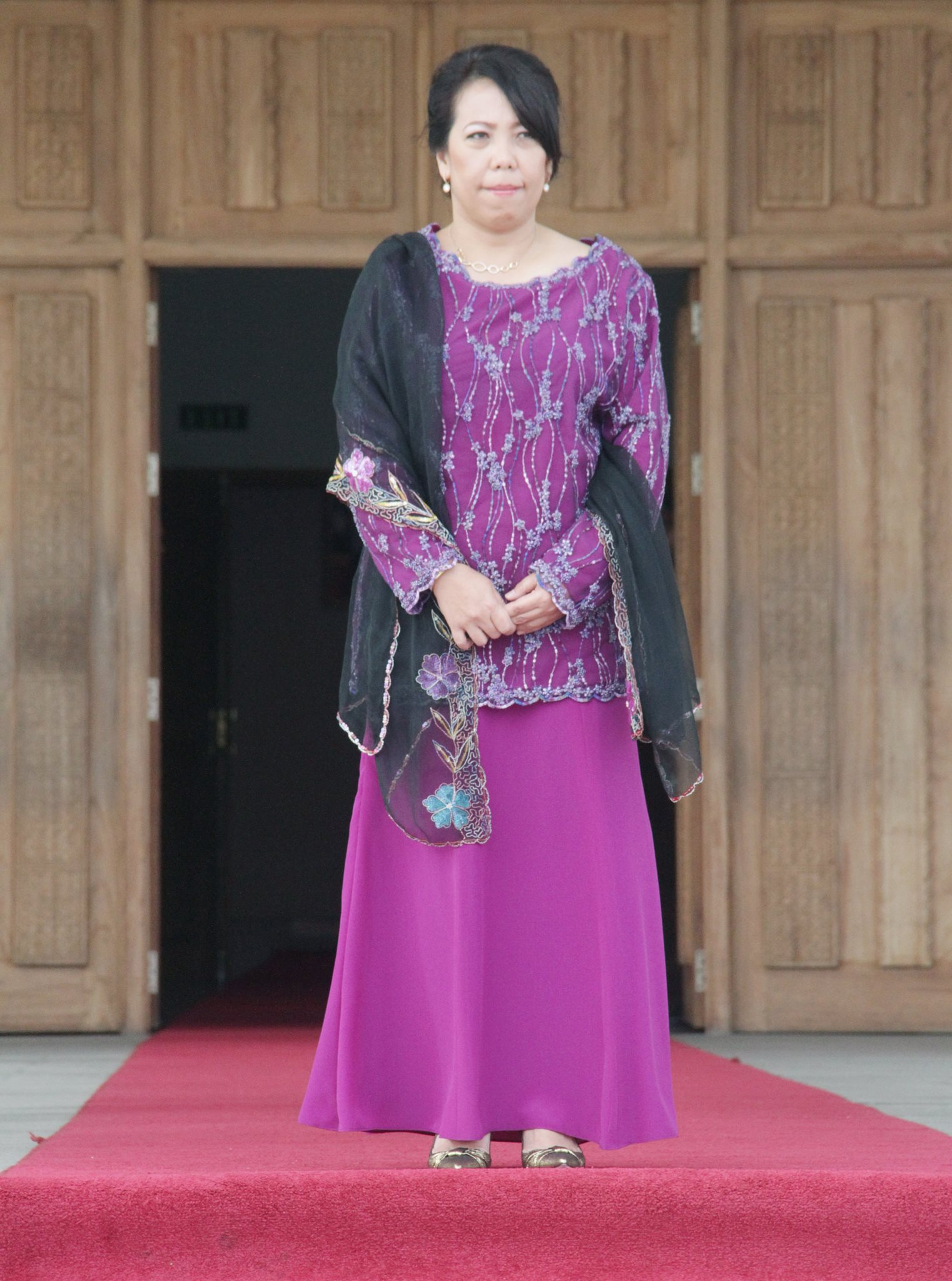
- Norazlianah in 2016

Ambassador of Brunei to East Timor
- In office 13 August 2016 – 2018
- Preceded by: Abdul Salam Momin
- Succeeded by: Adnan Mohd Ja'afar

Personal details
- Born: Brunei
- Education: Universiti Brunei Darussalam (BA); Tufts University (MA)
- Occupation: Diplomat

Norazlianah binti Haji Ibrahim is a diplomat from Brunei who became the ambassador to East Timor from 2016 to 2018. Additionally, she is the Minister-Counsellor and Deputy Permanent Representative of Brunei to the United Nations (UN).

== Education ==
Norazlianah obtained her Bachelor of Arts from the Universiti Brunei Darussalam in September 2008, and Master of Arts from Fletcher School of Law and Diplomacy at Tufts University.

== Career ==
=== Diplomatic career ===
On 22 August 2016, Sultan Hassanal Bolkiah handed over Norazlianah's letter of credentials, amid her appointment as the new ambassador to East Timor. According to Norazlianah at her meeting with President Francisco Guterres on 31 August 2017, the Brunei government will continue to support East Timor in the areas of education and the formation of a new government. As the Director of the Asia-Africa Department, she was promoted as Deputy Permanent Secretary (International Organisations) in the Ministry of Foreign Affairs in 2018.

Members of the Bangladesh community, a few Indian community members, diplomats (including Norazlianah), and some local Bruneians took part in Eid-al-Fitr celebrations held inside the chancery premises by the Bangladesh High Commission in Brunei in May 2022.

=== Activism ===
On 8 March 2022, the Bangladesh High Commission in Brunei sponsored an online event commemorating International Women's Day with the subject "Break the Bias." Norazlianah discussed the resilience and preparedness that girls in diplomatic careers require, as well as the willingness to be taught and fixed inventiveness in carrying their jobs. She has been a SSEAYP International Brunei Darussalam (BERSATU) member since 1993, assisting in the organisation of a number of the association's social and charitable activities.

Diplomatic posts
Preceded by Abdul Salam Momin	Ambassador of Brunei to East Timor; 13 August 2016 – 2018	Succeeded by Adnan Mohd Ja'afar
