= List of ambassadors of Brunei to Timor-Leste =

Coordinates: 8.5538312°S 125.5415748°E

Ambassador of Brunei to East Timor
- Emblem of Brunei

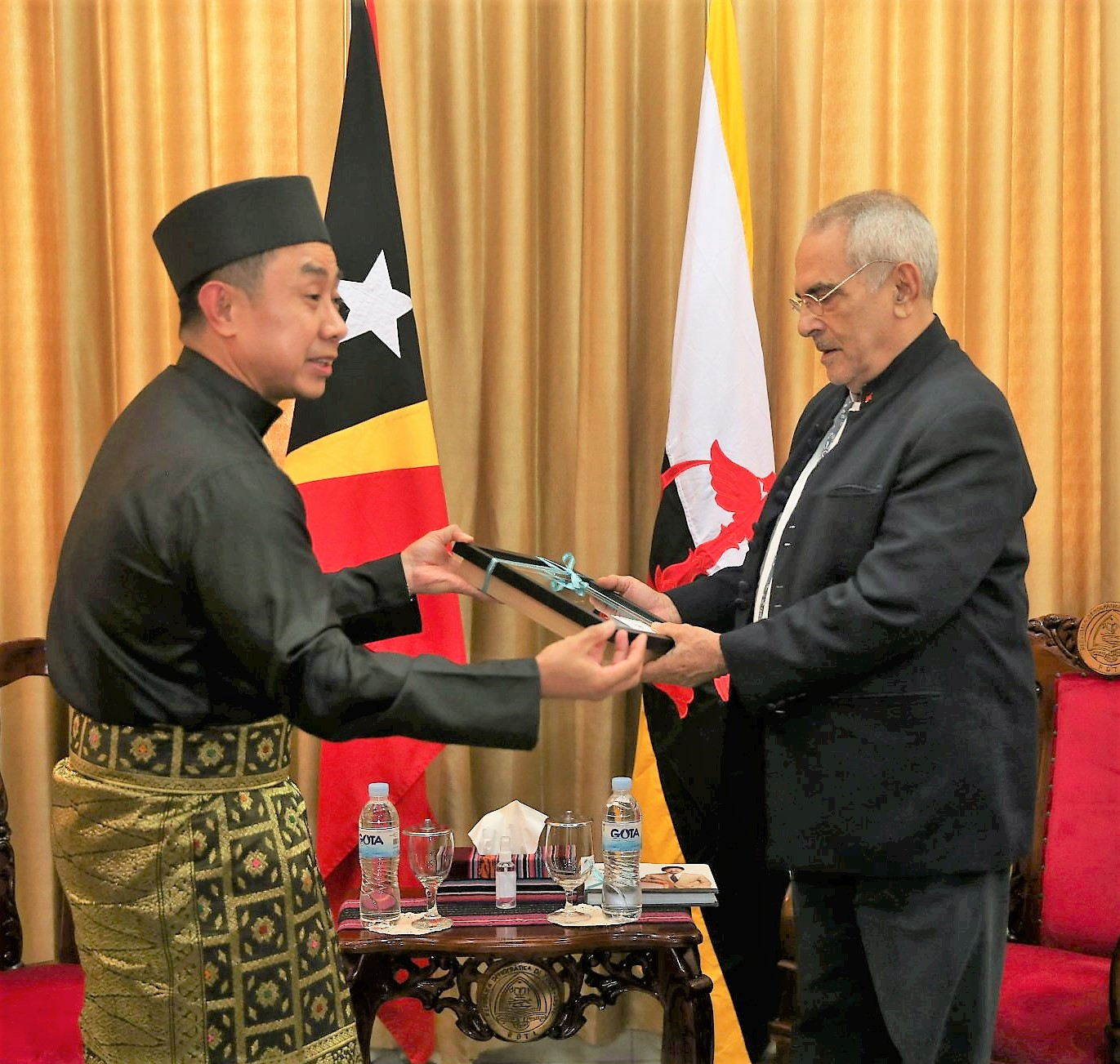
- Incumbent; Wan Hadfi Lutfan since 15 July 2022
- Style: His Excellency
- Residence: Dili
- Appointer: Sultan of Brunei
- Term length: At His Majesty's pleasure
- Inaugural holder: Abdul Salam Momin
- Formation: 10 March 2015
- Website: Official website

The Bruneian ambassador in Dili is the official representative of the Government in Bandar Seri Begawan to the Government of the East Timor.

== Chronology ==
Representation is as follows (years refer to dates of actual service):

- Governments in Dili and Bandar Seri Begawan established diplomatic relations: 2015
- Ambassador Extraordinary and Plenipotentiary to East Timor: since 2015

== List of ambassadors ==
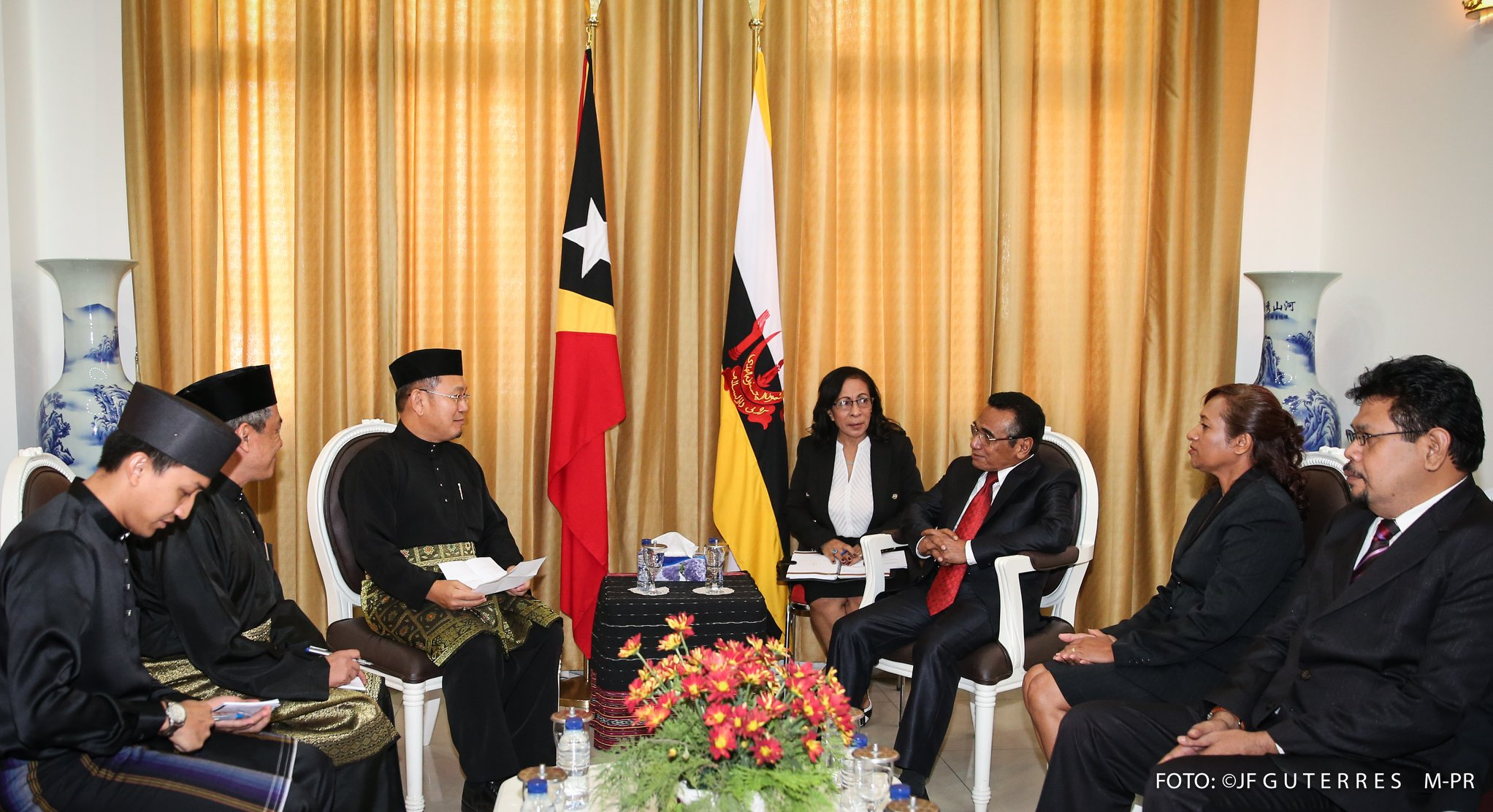
Ambassador Haji Adnan Bin Haji Mohd Jafar and President Francisco Guterres (2019)

Diplomatic agrément/Diplomatic accreditation	Ambassador	Observations	Prime Minister of Brunei	President of East Timor	Term end
9 June 2016	Dato Paduka Haji Abdul Salam bin Abdul Momin	First ambassador of Brunei to East Timor, since the creation of Brunei's diplomatic mission in Timor-Leste in 2015. Appointed by the Sultan on 10 March 2015.	Hassanal Bolkiah	Taur Matan Ruak	2016
13 August 2016	Hajah Norazlianah binti Haji Ibrahim	The official visit of Prime Minister Xanana Gusmão to Brunei in 2017 reaffirmed the two countries' mutual commitment to forging more substantive collaboration.	Hassanal Bolkiah	Taur Matan Ruak	2018
28 February 2019	Haji Adnan bin Haji Mohd Ja'afar	After meeting the Sultan on 3 July 2019, Dionísio Babo Soares stated that Brunei has "given assurance" that it will assist the country's application to join ASEAN, which the tiny nation hopes will happen shortly.	Hassanal Bolkiah	Francisco Guterres	17 November 2020
15 July 2022	Wan Hadfi Lutfan bin Haji Abdul Latif	President Jose Ramos-Horta arrived in Brunei on 5 November 2023, for a 4-day state visit. Timor-Leste wants to work with Brunei on forest conservation and the oil and gas industry. The ambassador Wan Hadfi Latif welcomed by Ágio Pereira on 28 September 2023.	Hassanal Bolkiah	José Ramos-Horta	incumbent

== See also ==
- East Timor–Brunei relations
