= Serbini Ali =

Bruneian diplomat (born 1955)

His Excellency Dato Paduka Serbini Ali DPMB
- سربيني علي
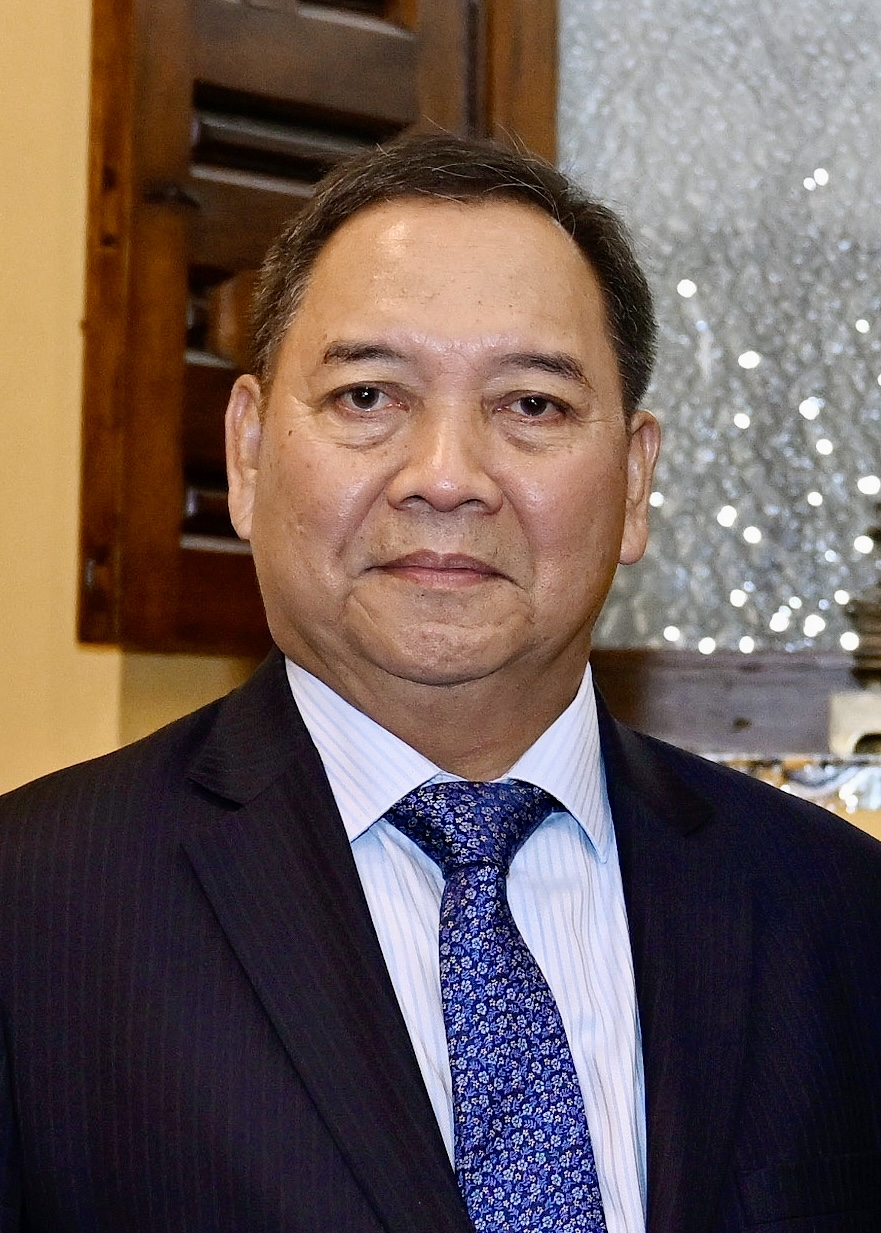
- Ambassador Serbini in 2024

Ambassador of Brunei to the United States
- Incumbent
- Assumed office 28 January 2016
- Monarch: Hassanal Bolkiah
- Preceded by: Yusoff Abdul Hamid

Ambassador of Brunei to Belgium
- In office 30 September 2010 – January 2016
- Preceded by: Alihashim Yussof
- Succeeded by: Abu Sufian Ali

Permanent Representative of Brunei to the United Nations
- In office 20 February 2001 – 2002
- Preceded by: Jemat Ampal
- Succeeded by: Shofry Abdul Ghafor

Personal details
- Born: 10 April 1955 (age 71) Brunei
- Spouse: Rafiah Ariff
- Children: 4
- Education: The Fletcher School at Tufts University

Serbini bin Haji Ali (born 10 April 1955) is Brunei's ambassador to the United States.

== Education and early career ==
Ali earned a master's degree in law and diplomacy from The Fletcher School at Tufts University. With effect from 13 December 2004, Serbini, the Deputy permanent secretary at the Ministry of Foreign Affairs, assumed the role of acting permanent secretary at the Ministry of Health.

== Diplomatic career ==
Ali started his diplomatic career at the Ministry of Foreign Affairs in 1980. Two years later, following his service at the Ministry of Foreign Affairs, he acted as second secretary in the High Commission in Singapore. After serving as first secretary at the Bangkok Embassy in 1984, he returned to Brunei as deputy director for protocol and consular affairs. In 1989, Ali was appointed first secretary in Tokyo and returned home in 1992 to serve as deputy director of the Economic Affairs Department. In 1996, following his appointment as director of Asian and Pacific Affairs, he moved to the ministry's policy division. The following year, he transferred to the Multilateral Economic Affairs Division.

Ali was appointed director of the Asia-Pacific Economic Cooperation Secretariat in 2000 after serving as its deputy director for a year. Later, as Brunei's permanent representative to the United Nations and ambassador to Colombia, he relocated to New York, and in 2002 he returned home to serve as deputy permanent secretary in the Ministry of Foreign Affairs. Two years later, he was appointed permanent secretary of the Ministry of Foreign Affairs, and in 2008 he served as permanent secretary of the Ministry of Interior. In the same year, he returned to diplomatic service as permanent representative to the European Union and ambassador to Belgium and Luxembourg.

Since 2016, Ali has been the ambassador of Brunei to the United States of America.

== Personal life ==
Ali is married with four children.

== Honours ==
- Order of Seri Paduka Mahkota Brunei Second Class (DPMB; 15 July 2005) – Dato Paduka

Diplomatic posts
| Preceded by Yusoff Abdul Hamid | Ambassador of Brunei to the United States; 28 January 2016 – present | Incumbent |
| Preceded by Alihashim Yussof | Ambassador of Brunei to Belgium; 30 September 2010 – January 2016 | Succeeded by Abu Sufian Ali |
| Preceded by Jemat Ampal | Permanent Representative of Brunei to the United Nations; 20 February 2001 – 2002 | Succeeded by Shofry Abdul Ghafor |
