= List of ambassadors of Brunei to Belgium =

Coordinates: 50.7982574°N 4.3946228°E

Ambassador of Brunei to Belgium
- Embajadores de Brunéi en Bélgica
- Emblem of Brunei

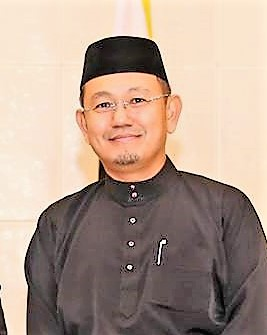
- Incumbent; Adnan Mohd Ja'afar since 20 April 2022
- Style: His Excellency
- Residence: Brussels
- Appointer: Sultan of Brunei
- Term length: At His Majesty's pleasure
- Inaugural holder: Mustapha Metasan
- Website: Official website

The Bruneian ambassador in Brussels is the official representative of the Government in Bandar Seri Begawan to the Government of Belgium. The ambassador in Brussels is accredited to the European Commission on a regular basis.

== Background ==
Brunei and Belgium established diplomatic relations on 3 May 1984. Brunei established an embassy in Brussels in 1992, whereas Belgium established an Honorary Consulate in Brunei in 1990.

== List of ambassadors ==
Diplomatic agrément/Diplomatic accreditation	Ambassador	Observations	Prime Minister of Brunei	Prime Minister of Belgium	Term end
16 September 1991	Pengiran Dato Paduka Haji Mustapha bin Pengiran Metassan	First ambassador of Brunei to Belgium	Hassanal Bolkiah	Wilfried Martens	1994
1 June 1995	Dato Seri laila Jasa Haji Mohammad Kassim bin Haji Mohammad Daud	In 1996, the Sultan paid a working visit to Belgium.	Hassanal Bolkiah	Jean-Luc Dehaene	
18 April 2002	Pengiran Dato Paduka Mashor bin Pengiran Ahmad		Hassanal Bolkiah	Guy Verhofstadt	2003
25 October 2004	Dato Paduka Haji Yusoff bin Haji Abdul Hamid		Hassanal Bolkiah	Guy Verhofstadt	
6 November 2006	Pengiran Haji Yunus bin Pengiran Haji Mahmud		Hassanal Bolkiah	Guy Verhofstadt	February 2007
29 May 2008	Pengiran Haji Alihashim bin Pengiran Haji Yussof		Hassanal Bolkiah	Yves Leterme	
30 September 2010	Dato Paduka Haji Serbini bin Haji Ali	On 3 October 2010, the Sultan met bilaterally with Yves Leterme to discuss measures to strengthen bilateral relations. That same trip, he also attended the 8th Asia-Europe Meeting (ASEM) in Brussels.	Hassanal Bolkiah	Yves Leterme	January 2016
22 February 2017	Abu Sufian bin Haji Ali	On 19 October 2018, the Sultan and Prince Abdul Mateen arrived in Brussels to attend the 12th Asia-Europe Meeting Summit.	Hassanal Bolkiah	Charles Michel	2021
20 April 2022	Haji Adnan bin Haji Mohd Ja'afar	Sultan has left for Brussels to attend the ASEAN-EU Commemorative Summit on 14 December 2022.	Hassanal Bolkiah	Alexander De Croo	incumbent

== See also ==
- Foreign relations of Brunei
