= Jemat Ampal =

Bruneian diplomat (born 1954)

Dato Paduka Jemat Ampal DPMB PSB PIKB PKL
- جيمت امڤال

Permanent Representative of Brunei to the United Nations
- In office 23 November 1998 – 2001
- Preceded by: Pengiran Maidin
- Succeeded by: Serbini Ali

Personal details
- Born: 18 February 1954 (age 72)
- Education: Paul H. Nitze SAIS (MSc); Edge Hill College (BEd)
- Occupation: Diplomat; restaurateur

Jemat bin Haji Ampal (born 18 February 1954) is a retired Bruneian diplomat, civil servant and restaurateur who became the permanent representatives of Brunei to the United Nations (UN) in New York City from 1998 to 2001.

== Education ==
Jemat completed his early education at Anthony Abell College, Seria in 1973. He later attended Southamption Technical College for a Bachelor of Arts in English. graduated with honors from Lancaster University School of Education in the UK's Edge Hill College of Higher Education and Johns Hopkins University's Paul H. Nitze School of Advanced International Studies with a master's degree in international public policy and a bachelor's degree in education.

== Career ==
In 1978, Jemat started working for the Bruneian government as an education officer in the Ministry of Education. He was hired six years later as a diplomatic officer in the Research Department by the Ministry of Foreign Affairs (MFA). He was the second local principal of the Perdana Wazir Secondary School (SMPW) from 1982 to 1984. For four years beginning in 1989, he served as the Political Department's deputy director. His appointment as Brunei's deputy permanent representative to the UN in the United States, took place in 1993.

Jemat was appointed as the MFA's private and confidential secretary to Prince Mohamed Bolkiah upon his return to Brunei in 1996. Two years later, he received a new assignment to serve as Brunei's permanent representative to the UN in New York City, where he officially presented his credentials to Secretary-General Kofi Annan on 23 November 1998. He returned to Brunei in July 2000 to assume the role of director of the MFA' Research Department. He was appointed director of the Prime Minister's Office's (PMO) Internal Security Department in May 2001. He served as permanent secretary in the PMO from January 2003 until January 2004. He later served as the permanent secretary at the Ministry of Culture, Youth and Sports.

In 2008, the co-chairman of China's Earthquake Aid Fund and the Myanmar Typhoon Nargis Humanitarian Fund, Jemat, clarified that the committee is composed of several individuals from the business sector, non-governmental organizations, and government agencies. Additionally as the head of the Brunei Darussalam Relief Fund for Aceh tsunami victims, he said that the funds will be used to buy medication and other medical supplies in 2005.

== Later life ==
Jemat would go on to own the Nurwanita Restaurant in Brunei.

The director of Kreuz Subsea, Jemat, signed on behalf of Kreuz Subsea at the signing ceremony between the two joint venture partners, Kreuz Subsea and SPHI Marine, and the launch of the vessel, Kreuz Challenger, at Muara Port's Cruise Ship Center in Muara on 19 April 2018.

On 11 October 2021, he was among the speakers to give a motivational talk in the to goal of advocating youth leadership and entrepreneurship at the Kampong Bolkiah Community Centre.

== Personal life ==
Jemat enjoys playing badminton, windsurfing, golfing, and reading.

== Honours ==
Jemat is known to be awarded the following honours:

- Order of Seri Paduka Mahkota Brunei Second Class (DPMB; 15 July 2006) – Dato Paduka
- Order of Seri Paduka Mahkota Brunei Third Class (SMB)
- Order of Setia Negara Brunei Fourth Class (PSB)
- Excellent Service Medal (PIKB)
- Long Service Medal (PKL)

Diplomatic posts
Preceded by Pengiran Maidin	Permanent Representative of Brunei to the United Nations; 23 November 1998 – 2001	Succeeded by Serbini Ali
