= Bangladesh–Brunei relations =

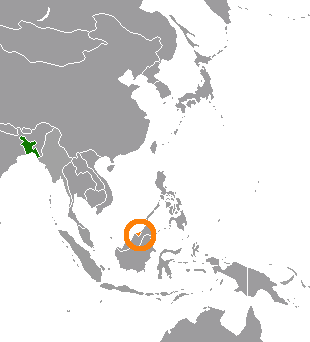

- Bangladesh: Brunei

Bangladesh and Brunei established diplomatic relations in 1984. Brunei has a high commission in Dhaka and Bangladesh has one in Bandar Seri Begawan. Air Vice Marshal Mahmud Hussain is the Bangladeshi High Commissioner to Brunei. Bangladesh is a source of workers for Brunei.

Both Bangladesh and Brunei are members of the Commonwealth of Nations.

== History ==
Historically, the Bengal Sultanate and the Bruneian Empire had maritime links and political contacts.

Modern Bangladesh and Brunei established diplomatic relations on 5 May 1984 after the independence of Brunei. President Hussain Mohammad Ershad appointed Iftekhar Karim the first ambassador of Bangladesh to Brunei. Karim was an executive of Bank of Credit & Commerce International stationed in Paris and married to Nasrine R Karim who was the daughter of Foreign Minister of Bangladesh Humayun Rashid Choudhury.

Bangladesh established a High Commission in Brunei Darussalam in July 1985 and Brunei established an embassy in Dhaka on 29 July 1999.

Bangladesh's High Commission in Brunei was closed in 1988 and in 1997 it was reopened. Bangladesh and Brunei both participated in the November 2017 Cooperation Afloat Readiness and Training naval exercise. Bangladesh and Brunei both do not have allow Israeli citizens entry to their countries. They are both members of the Organisation of Islamic Cooperation.

== Economic relations ==
In 2008, Brunei asked Bangladesh for workers. Brunei is the second largest destination of Bangladeshi expatriate workers in Southeast Asia, and in 2013 Brunei recruited 5,038 Bangladeshi workers.
