= Instituto Nacional de Estatística de Timor-Leste =

Statistical service of East Timor

The building of National Institute of Statistics in Dili, Timor-Leste

The National Institute of Statistics of Timor-Leste (pt. Instituto Nacional de Estatística de Timor-Leste) is the national government agency for statistics of East Timor. It is responsible for compiling and disseminating data on the people, society, economy and environment of the nation and the national censuses.

The agency was formed in 2023 as the successor to the Direcção Nacional de Estatística (Portuguese for National Directorate of Statistics). The DNE was a state department under the Directorate-General of Analysis and Research of the Ministry of Finance.
