= Tatiana Valovaya =

Russian journalist, economist and diplomat (born 1958)

Tatyana Dmitrievna Valovaya
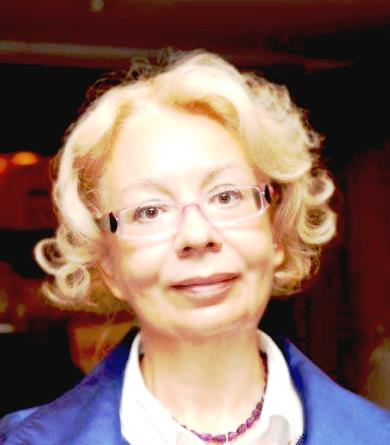
- Valovaya in 2013

13th Director General of the United Nations Office at Geneva (UN Geneva)
- Incumbent
- Assumed office May 2019
- Preceded by: Michael Møller

Minister for Integration and Macroeconomics of the Eurasian Economic Commission (EEC)
- In office 2014–2017

Personal details
- Born: April 11, 1958 (age 68) Moscow, Soviet Union
- Education: Moscow Financial Institute

Tatyana Dmitrievna Valovaya (Russian: Татьяна Дмитриевна Валовая; born 11 April 1958) is a Russian journalist, economist, politician and diplomat. Since 2019 she has served as the Director General of the United Nations Office at Geneva (UN Geneva). She has previously held roles in the Government of the Russian Federation and the Eurasian Economic Commission (EEC).

== Biography ==
Valovaya was born on 11 April 1958 and was raised in Moscow in the Soviet Union. She studied a PhD at the Moscow Financial Institute, graduating in 1980. Valovaya worked at The Economic Gazette in Moscow from 1984 to 1989. She wrote articles about international monetary relations and European economic integration.

From 1989 to 1994, Valovaya served as Third then Second Secretary at Russia’s Permanent Mission to the European Union (EU) in Brussels, Belgium. She was Director of the Department of International Cooperation of the Government of the Russian Federation from 1999 to 2012.

From 2014 to 2017, Valovaya was a Board Member and Minister for Integration and Macroeconomics of the Eurasian Economic Commission (EEC), which includes the countries of Armenia, Belarus, Kazakhstan, Kyrgyzstan and Russia. In this position, she spoke at events in Cambodia and has stated that the EEC does not need to introduce a single currency similar to the Euro.

On 30 May 2019, Valovaya was appointed Director General of the United Nations Office at Geneva (UN Geneva), succeeding Danish diplomat Michael Møller. She is 13th Director General and is the first woman to hold this position. Valovaya also became Secretary-General of the multilateral Conference on Disarmament (CD) and Personal Representative of the UN Secretary-General to the CD. She is a member of the Honorary Committee of the Diplomatic Club of Geneva.

In these roles, Valovaya has defended the credibility of United Nations Charter and Universal Declaration of Human Rights, but has been criticised by French publications for her silence on the Russo-Ukrainian War and how this reflects on the United Nations. She has also spoken on the financial challenges facing the UN Secretariat, for example due to electricity costs, and the future on multilateralism.

In September 2022, Valovaya was a member of the panel which relaunched the International Gender Champions "I Say No To Sexism Campaign."

== Awards ==
Nizami Ganjavi International Award (2021)
