= International Gender Champions =

Organization for gender equality

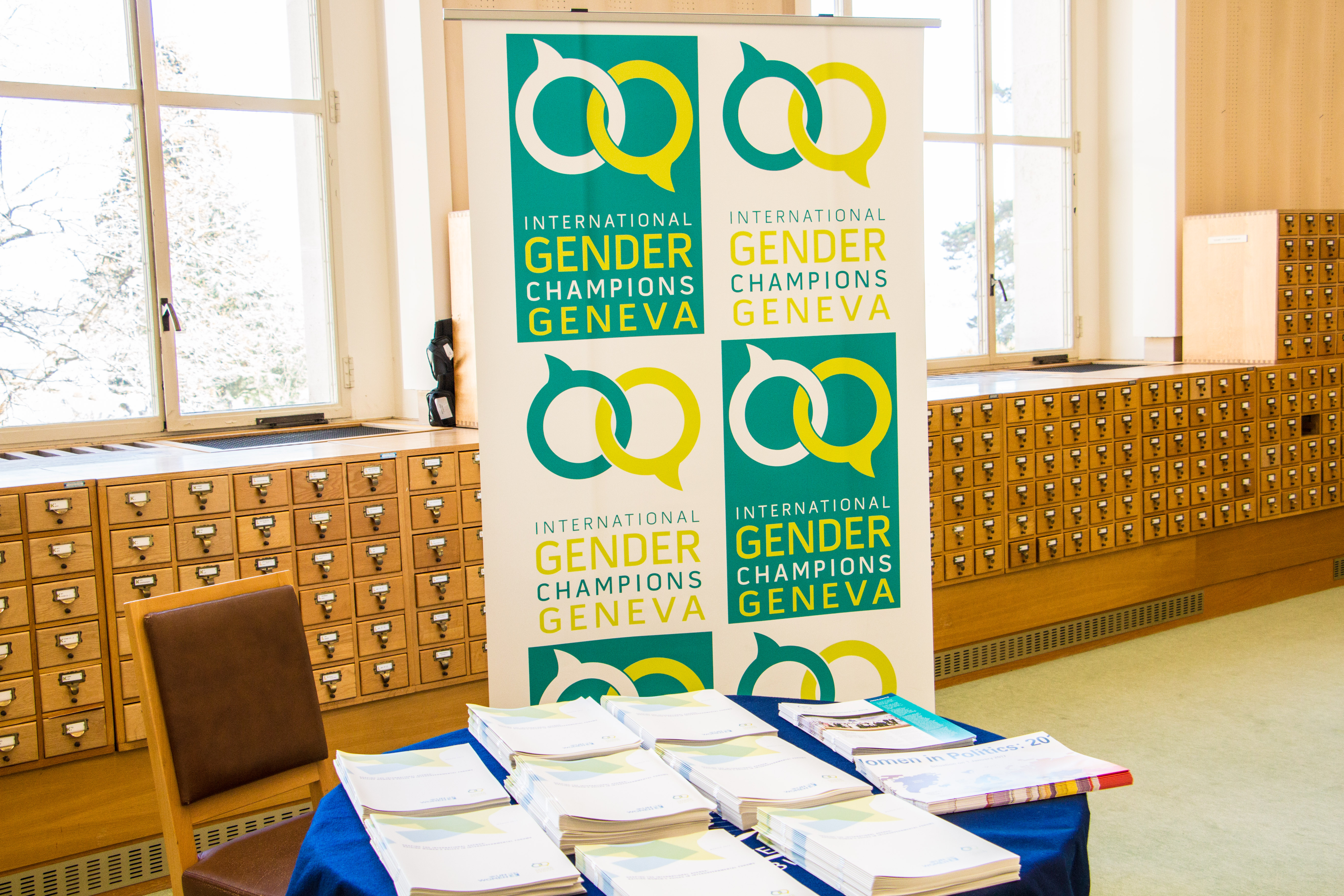
Sign showing ICG logo in a library setting

International Gender Champions (IGC) is a network of female and male leaders of member states, international organizations, and civil society working for gender equality. It is an initiative of Women@TheTable, and was founded in 2015 by Caitlin Kraft-Buchman of Women@TheTable, Ambassador Pam Hamamoto, Permanent Representative of the United States to the United Nations in Geneva, and Michael Møller, the Under-Secretary-General of the United Nations and current Director-General of the United Nations Office at Geneva.

== Purpose ==
Champions pledge to no longer sit on single sex panels, and commit to implementing two individual institutional commitments for gender equality in their work. According to co-founder Caitlin Kraft-Buchman, International Gender Champions' strategy is to help make a wide range of organizations make "huge changes through tiny steps" by committing to realistic, achievable transformations for gender equality.

At the IGC launch in 2015, Møller stated, "With the unique concentration of Member States, international organizations, civil society, research and academic institutions and private sector entities, International Geneva provides an ideal platform to show that leadership in a most practical way. Together, our actions have a truly global impact, making a difference for peace, rights and well-being for all people across the plant. We have a special responsibility to capitalize on this potential for greater gender equality."

== Network ==
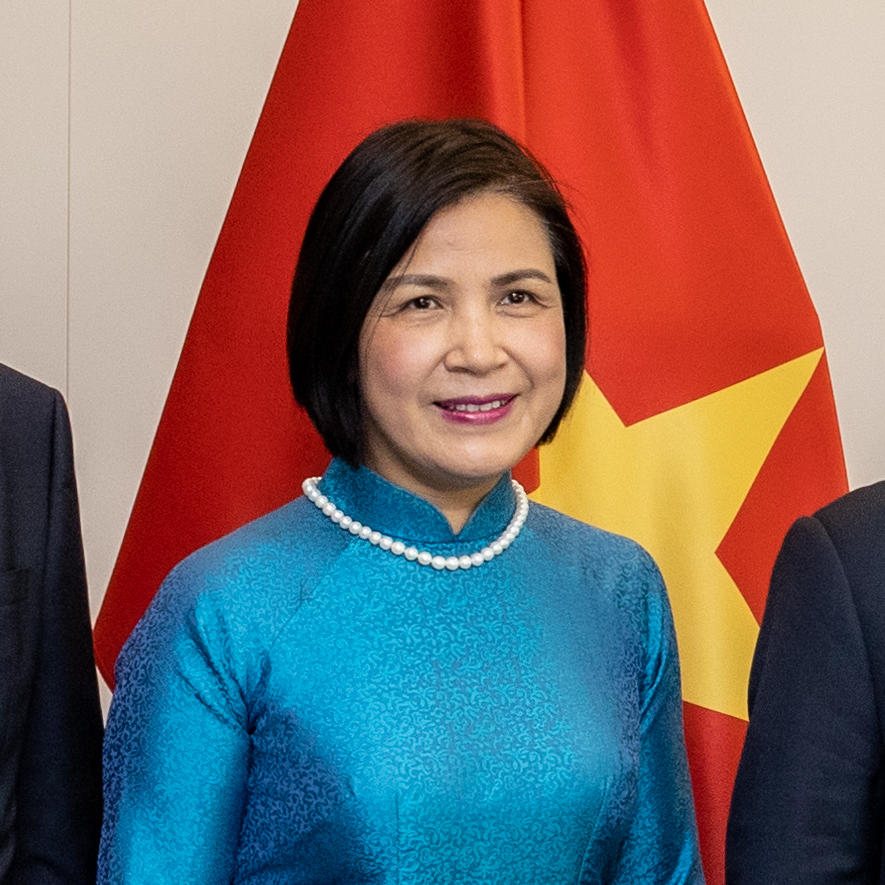
Vietnam's Le Thi Tuyet Mai

There are currently over 200 International Gender Champions in Geneva, New York, Vienna, and Nairobi. Champions include UN Secretary General António Guterres, the heads of UN Offices at Geneva, Vienna, and Nairobi, the ILO, WHO, WTO, WIPO, ITU, UNHCR, OHCHR, IPU, UNIDO, and other member states and civil society groups.

After joining IGC, Secretary General Guterres stated, "I encourage other senior leaders to be part of this campaign for equality. (…) "In a male dominated world, the empowerment of women must be a key priority. (…) Women’s rights are human rights – and attacks on women are attacks on all of us. (…) Our world needs more women leaders. And our world needs more men standing up for gender equality".

Other supporters include:

- Julia Imene-Chanduru, former Permanent Representative of Namibia to the United Nations Office in Geneva
- Le Thi Tuyet Mai, Ambassador and Permanent Representative of the Permanent Mission of Viet Nam to the United Nations Office and the World Trade Organization.
- Frances Lanitou, Ambassador of the Republic of Cyprus to countries including Belgium, Bosnia and Herzegovina, China, Hungary, the Grand Duchy of Luxembourg, Moldova and the Netherlands.
- Maira Mariela Macdonal Alvarez, Permanent Representative of Bolivia to the United Nations in Geneva and Vice-President of the United Nations Human Rights Council.
- Tatiana Molcean, Executive Secretary of the United Nations Economic Commission for Europe (UNECE).

== Impact Groups ==
IGC has organized impact groups, led by Champions which channel sector knowledge in greater detail on Representation, Trade, Change Management, Disarmament, and Standards. On the occasion of the World Trade Organization's Ministerial Conference in Buenos Aires in December 2017, the IGC Trade Impact Group was joined by 120 WTO members and observers to issue the historic Joint Declaration on Trade and Women's Economic Empowerment, the first international declaration to explicitly link women's economic empowerment and trade. Susana Malcorra, who presided over the conference, called the Declaration a "great success… Collectively, we were able to recognize the key role women can play in a fair, just and sustainable international trade system. The fact that so many countries, both members and observers of the WTO, rallied behind women's empowerment in this field signifies that not everything is lost."

== Events ==
In 2017 and 2018, Geneva's Jet d'Eau was illuminated on International Women's Day with the turquoise of the International Gender Champions logo.
