= Australia–Brunei relations =

- Australia: Brunei

Diplomatic mission
- High Commission: High Commission

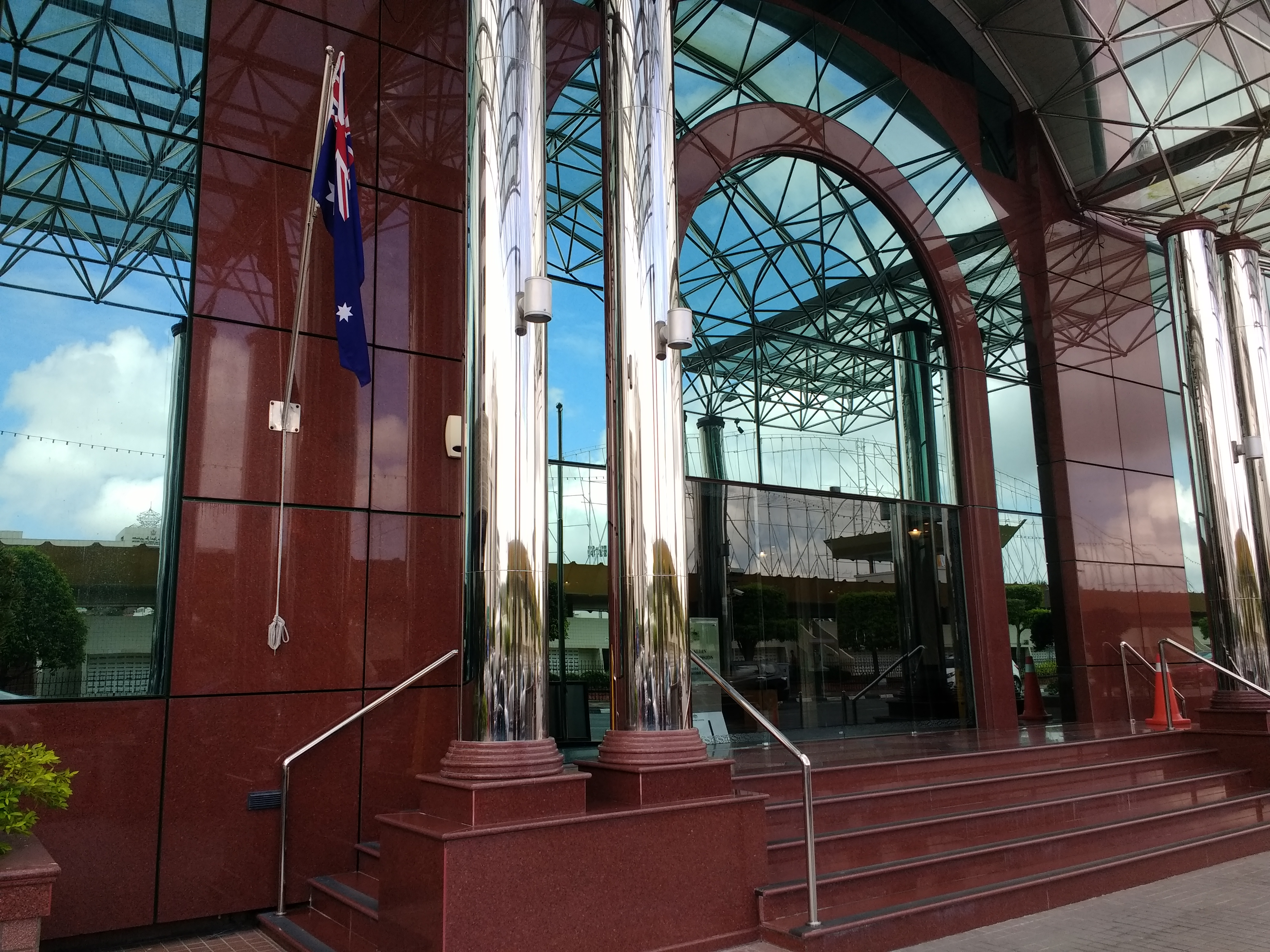
Australian High Commission in Bandar Seri Begawan

Australia and Brunei established diplomatic relations in 1984. Australia has a high commission in Bandar Seri Begawan, and Brunei has a high commission in Canberra.

== History ==
Relations between the two countries can be traced back during World War II when the Australian Army played a crucial role to liberating Brunei from Japanese occupation in 1945. While the present relations between the two countries were established since 1984 when Australia became one of the first countries to establish diplomatic relations with Brunei. Both countries had enjoyed a warm relationship before 1959 when Brunei achieved self-government, after which relations became mainly focused on defence and security, education, as well as on trade.

== Economic relations ==
Monthly value (A$ millions) of merchandise imported to Australia from Brunei since 1988

Monthly value (A$ millions) of merchandise exported from Australia to Brunei since 1988

From 2012 to 2013, Brunei was ranked as Australia's 39th largest trading partner with the total bilateral trade between the two countries reached U$1.026 billion. Brunei crude petroleum comprising U$978 million of the total trade. There is also a number of Australian teachers and other professionals work in Brunei while Australia became one of the destination for Bruneian students.

In response to disruptions caused by the 2026 Iran War, Sultan of Brunei Hassanal Bolkiah and Australian Prime Minister Anthony Albanese signed an agreement to supply Bruneian oil and fertilisers to Australia.

== Security relations ==
Both countries enjoy defence relations particularly in military exercises and trainings.
