= Michael Møller =

Danish diplomat

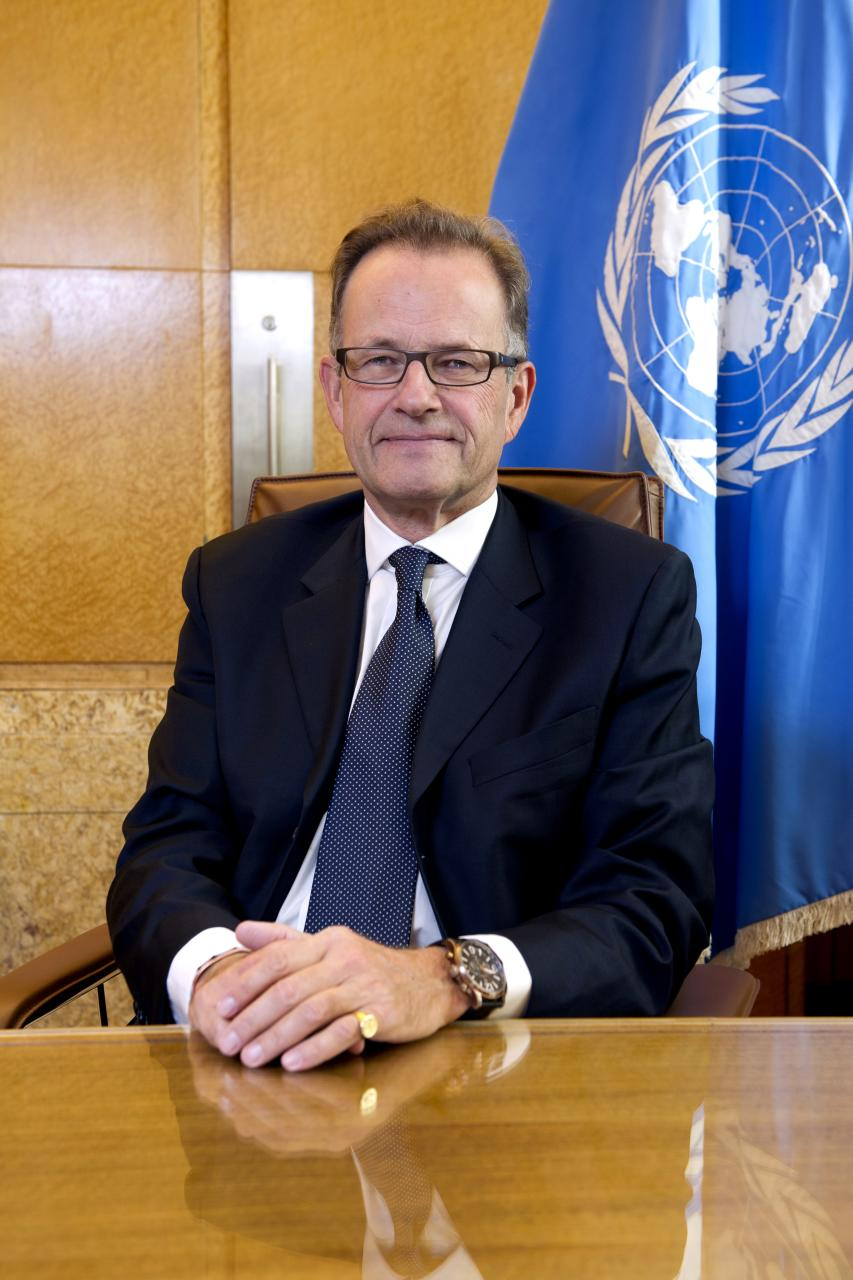
- Møller in 2013

12th Director-General of the United Nations Office at Geneva
- In office 2013–2019
- Preceded by: Kassym-Jomart Tokayev
- Succeeded by: Tatiana Valovaya

Personal details
- Born: 9 November 1952 (age 73)

Michael Møller (born 9 November 1952) is president of the Diplomatic Forum of the Geneva Science and Diplomacy Anticipator Foundation, principal advisor at Macro Advisory Partners and member of the boards of several foundations, including the Kofi Annan Foundation. He is Honorary President of the Association of Former International Civil Sevants for Development (Greycells). He is a Danish former Under-Secretary-General of the United Nations and the 12th director-general of the United Nations Office at Geneva (UNOG). He was also the secretary-general of the Conference on Disarmament and the United Nations Secretary-General's personal representative to the conference. He was appointed to these roles by Secretary-General Ban Ki-moon in November 2013 and was reappointed by Secretary-General António Guterres in February 2017 for another year. Møller has over 40 years of experience as an international civil servant in the United Nations System, serving in different roles in New York, Iran, Mexico, Haiti and Geneva. Prior to his tenure as director-general, he was the executive director of the Kofi Annan Foundation from 2008 to 2011.

== Education ==
Born in Copenhagen in 1952, Møller took courses in political science at the Institute for Political Science of the University of Aarhus, in Denmark. In 1976, he received his B.A. in international relations at the University of Sussex, in the United Kingdom. He earned his M.A. in international relations in 1978 from Johns Hopkins University, where he specialized in international organizations and the European Economic Community. He was enrolled at the European campus of the Paul H. Nitze School of Advanced International Studies, in Bologna, Italy.

== United Nations career ==
Møller began his career in 1979 with the United Nations High Commissioner for Refugees (UNHCR) as a programme officer and legal officer at its headquarters in Geneva. He was soon after appointed assistant to the director of the Division of International Protection. In 1982 he was promoted to second officer of the UNHCR Regional Office in New York, where he stayed until 1984. This period proved highly formative for his later career, having witnessed war and human suffering first-hand.

After the UNHCR, Møller went on to hold various roles within the United Nations System, in Iran, Mexico, Haiti, Cyprus, New York and Geneva. Møller has held the following positions:

=== New York, United States ===
- Assistant representative, UNHCR Liaison Office and Regional Office for the Caribbean, New York (1982–1985)
- Special assistant to the assistant secretary-general, Office of Secretariat Services for Economic and Social Matters (1985–1987)
- Special assistant to the assistant secretary-general in charge of the Centre against Apartheid, Department of Political Affairs (UN-DPA) (1988–1992)
- Special assistant to the assistant secretary-general for Political Affairs, UN-DPA (1992)
- Deputy director, Americas Division, UN-DPA (1994)
- Senior political affairs officer, Office of the Special Advisor to the Secretary-General (1994–1995)
- Principal officer, Office of the Under-Secretary-General for Political Affairs (1997–2001)
- Director for political, peacekeeping and humanitarian affairs, and deputy chef de cabinet, Executive Office of the Secretary-General (2001–2006)

=== Geneva, Switzerland ===
- Programme officer and legal officer, UNHCR (1979)
- Assistant to the director, Division of International Protection, UNHCR (1979–1982)
- Senior political adviser to the director-general of the United Nations Office at Geneva (1995–1997)

=== Other ===
- Political advisor to the United Nations Military Inspection Team of Iran (1985)
- Head of Sub-Office for Southern Mexico, UNHCR (1987–1988)
- Head of the United Nations Component, Joint UN/OAS Civilian Mission in Haiti (MICIVIH)(1993)
- Assistant Secretary-General of the United Nations, special representative of the secretary-general and chief of mission, United Nations Peacekeeping Force in Cyprus (2006–2008)
- Executive director, Kofi Annan Foundation (2008–2011)

== Tenure as director-general of the UN Office at Geneva ==
On 5 November 2013, Secretary-General Ban Ki-moon appointed Møller as the acting head of the United Nations Office at Geneva (UNOG), succeeding Kassym-Jomart Tokayev. He was confirmed in that position in June 2015.

As director-general, Møller oversees all activities at UNOG. He represents the secretary-general. He fosters cooperation with specialized agencies and programmes in Switzerland and Europe, as well as intergovernmental, non-governmental organizations and other established institutions, including research and academic institutions. As director-general, Møller has sought to deepen collaboration across Geneva and to communicate the importance of the work done in that city. In recognition of his work to promote International Geneva and break down barriers between international and local Geneva, the City of Geneva awarded Møller in May 2016 its Médaille Genève reconnaissante. In October 2016, the Union Suisse des Attachés de Presse (USAP) awarded Møller its Excellence in Communication award, while the Fondation pour Genève awarded him its Prize in March 2017 in recognition of his work in promoting International Geneva.

Møller also serves as the secretary-general of the Conference on Disarmament. Because he is convinced that the conference is capable of moving forward on multilateral disarmament, Møller has often expressed disappointment with the body's failure to forge a substantive consensus over the past two decades. In Møller's opinion, states must be committed now, more than ever, to establish a safer world for everyone.

=== Sustainable development ===
Since the General Assembly adopted the 2030 Agenda for Sustainable Development on 25 September 2015, Møller has promoted Geneva as the operational hub of the Global Goals, pointing out that over 70 organizations in Geneva are directly working to achieve the 17 Sustainable Development Goals. According to Møller, Geneva not only brings to bear an unprecedented wealth of technical expertise and institutional know-how, but is also uniquely suited to forge the kinds of partnerships needed to reach the SDGs. Under his leadership, pursuing the Global Goals has become a priority for UNOG.

To that end, Møller established in December 2016 the SDG Lab, a unit within his office to support the range of stakeholders in Geneva working to advance the 2030 Agenda by further leveraging their "expertise and knowledge into policy, practice and action".

According to the SDG Lab website: "The Lab works with a diverse ecosystem of actors that are focused on delivering the SDGs and identifies strategic opportunities for convergence in order to energize and maximize the added-value of International Geneva in supporting implementation of the SDGs, including but not limited to United Nations & Intergovernmental Organizations, Member States, Civil Society and NGOs, Academia, and the Private Sector".

=== Perception Change Project ===
As director-general, Møller has sought to correct misconceptions about the work of the United Nations and its partners in Geneva. Although it often goes unnoticed, the decisions taken and the regulations forged in that city help make everyone's lives safer and healthier. In an interview from April 2014, Møller said, "Everything that is done here in Geneva has a direct impact on every person on the planet, in any 24 hour period."

To help convey the impact and relevance of the work done in Geneva, Møller launched the Perception Change Project in his office in 2014. As of June 2017, the project has over 100 partners, including UN and other international organizations, NGOs, permanent missions and foundations, working together to convey the importance of the work done in Geneva and beyond and to facilitate the sharing of knowledge.

=== Strategic Heritage Plan ===
The Strategic Heritage Plan was a priority Møller inherited upon his appointment as director-general of UNOG. Built in the 1930s, the Palais des Nations has never been completely renovated and substantial repairs are needed. This is particularly vital at a time when the Palais des Nations is one of the busiest conference centres in the world, hosting or supporting over 12,000 meetings every year. Møller spearheaded the renovation planning process, and in September 2015 he confirmed that the Swiss Federal Council would provide an interest-free loan of 400 million Swiss francs for the renovation. The total cost of the renovation is estimated at 837 million Swiss francs. The project is intended to be completed by the end of 2023.

=== Geneva Gender Champions ===
On 1 July 2015, Møller teamed up with US Ambassador Pamela Hamamoto and Caitlin Kraft-Buchman, executive director of Women@TheTable, to launch the International Geneva Gender Champions, a leadership network committed to accomplishing meaningful change in the pursuit of gender equality. Like every other Gender Champion, Møller pledged not to participate in panels that failed to ensure both gender representatives. He also committed to the creation of a comprehensive gender policy framework for UNOG. In 2016, Møller delivered on this promise when he unveiled UNOG's new gender policy. Also in 2016, the Geneva Gender Champions became the International Gender Champions when it unveiled a branch in New York City. Other Gender Champions branches are opening in Bonn/Berlin, Vienna, Rome, Nairobi and elsewhere. Secretary-General Gutteres is a Champion as are a host of other senior UN officials.

== Personal life ==
Having a father who was a Danish diplomat, Møller started travelling at the age of five. He has lived in Denmark, the United Kingdom, Germany, France, Czechoslovakia, Italy, Greece, Algeria, Switzerland, Iran, Haiti, the United States, Mexico, and Cyprus for various periods of time. He has described himself as a “perpetual migrant”. His mother tongue is Danish and he speaks fluent French, English, Spanish, German, Italian and Greek. Møller has long had a passion for the arts and he is the honorary president of Art for The World, a non-governmental organization associated with the United Nations Department of Public Information (UNDPI) that seeks to create meaningful dialogue on human rights and development through the universal language of art.
