= Order of Islam Brunei =

Order of Brunei

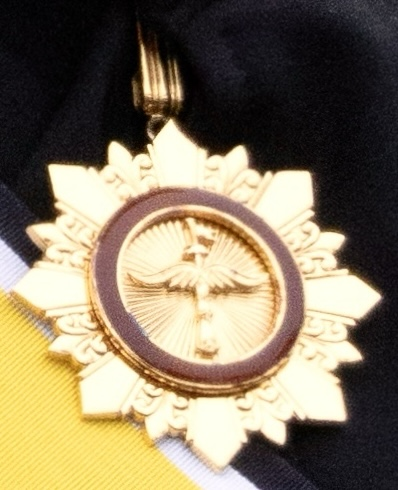
- DSSUB neck decoration

Awarded by the Sultan of Brunei
- Type: Order of chivalry
- Established: 1968
- Country: Brunei
- Awarded for: For service in the propagation, preservation and strengthening of Islam
- Status: Currently constituted
- Sovereign: Hassanal Bolkiah
- Grades: Grand Commander (PSSUB); Commander (DSSUB); Companion (SSUB); Officer (SUB); Member (PUB)

Precedence
- Next (higher): Family Order of Seri Utama
- Next (lower): Order of Paduka Laila Jasa Keberanian Gemilang
- (PSSUB) (DSSUB) (SSUB) (SUB) (PUB)

The Most Eminent Order of Islam Brunei (Malay: Darjah Seri Ugama Islam Negara Brunei Yang Amat Bersinar), also translated as The Most Illustrious Islamic Religious Order of the State of Brunei, is an order of Brunei. It was established on 1 August 1968 by Sultan Hassanal Bolkiah for service in the propagation, preservation and strengthening of the Islamic religion.

== Current classes ==
The five classes of appointment to the Order are, from highest grade to lowest grade:

Class	Post-nominal	Title	Ribbon bar
Grand Commander	PSSUB	Dato Paduka Seri Setia	
Commander	DSSUB	Dato Seri Setia	
Companion	SSUB	—	
Officer	SUB	—	
Member	PUB	—	

== Recipients ==
=== First Class ===
- Unknown – Omar Ali Saifuddien III – Sultan of Brunei
- Unknown – Ismail Omar Abdul Aziz – State Mufti
- Unknown – Yahya Ibrahim – Deputy Minister of Religious Affairs
- Unknown – Yusoff Ismail – Deputy Minister of Education
- Unknown – Mahmud Saedon – Muslim scholar
- 1972 – Zain Serudin – Minister of Religious Affairs
- 1976 – Abdul Hamid Bakal – Member of the Legislative Council
- 1976 – Metali Matyassin – Manteri Ugama
- 1984 – Abdul Aziz Juned – State Mufti
- 1998 – Badaruddin Othman – Minister of Religious Affairs

=== Second Class ===
- 1972 – Abdul Rahman Taha – Member of Privy Council
- 1990 – Abang Razali Abang Zainuddin
- 1990 – Mohd Tamin Abdul Hamid
- 2002 – Adam Ahmad – Director of Pusat Da'wah Islamiah
- 2002 – Rajid Abdul Kadir – Director of Mosque Affairs
- 2003 – Pengiran Mohammad Abdul Rahman – Minister of Religious Affairs
- 2013 – Abdul Aziz Yusof – Permanent Secretary at the Ministry of Religious Affairs
- 2017 – Pengiran Mohammad Tashim – Judge of the Syariah High Court
- 2017 – Mazanan Yusof – Head of Research at the State Mufti Office
- 2022 – Dennie Abdullah – Assistant Mufti Ifta
- 2024 – Norarfan Zainal – Rector of Universiti Islam Sultan Sharif Ali

=== Third Class ===
- Unknown – Zasia Sirin – Member of the Legislative Council
- 2010 – Pengiran Bahrom – Deputy Minister of Religious Affairs
- 2011 – Mail Besar – Speaker from the Islamic Da'wah Centre
- 2011 – Mahani Musa – Acting Deputy Secretary of Brunei Islamic Religious Council
- 2011 – Rusma Kepli – Head of the Policy and Meeting Section of the Policy, Planning and Research Division
- 2017 – Siti Noor Dzuhairah – Champion of the National Musabaqah Al-Quran
- 2017 – Rosle Jumat – Acting Director of Administration at the State Mufti Office
- 2017 – Mas Raduan Jumat – Head of Buhuth at the State Mufti Office
- 2017 – Siti Noor Dzuhairah – Qariah runners-up at the 59th International Level Al-Quran Recitation Ceremony in Kuala Lumpur
- 2022 – Muhammad Bahrin Alias – Chief Registrar of the Syariah Appeal Court
