= Sultan Hassan Secondary School =

Government school in Bangar, Brunei

- Sekolah Menengah Sultan Hassan

Location
- Kampong Batu Apoi, Temburong, PC1151; Brunei
- Coordinates: 4°43′06″N 115°06′53″E

Information
- Former names: Sultan Hassan Malay School; Sultan Hassan Malay Secondary School
- School type: Government
- Established: c. 1962
- School district: Cluster 1
- Authority: Ministry of Education
- Principal: Helmy bin Abdul Rahman (Acting)
- Grades: Years 7-11
- Gender: Coeducational
- Affiliation: CIE
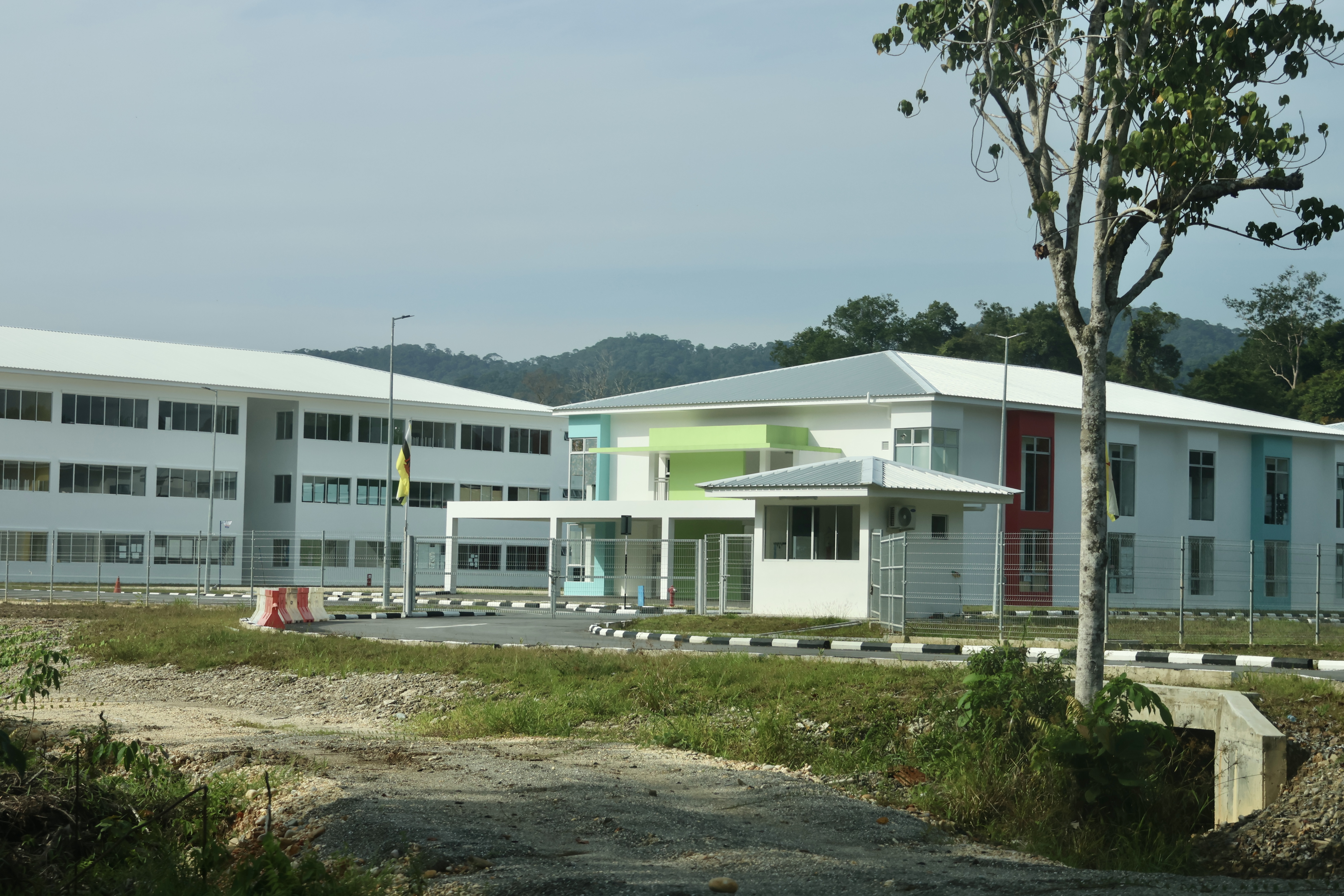
- Batu Apoi complex in 2023

Sultan Hassan Secondary School (Malay: Sekolah Menengah Sultan Hassan; SMSH) is a government secondary school located in Kampong Batu Apoi of Temburong District, Brunei. It is the only secondary school in the district, and the first school in the district to offer adult education in 1968.

== History ==
In 1962, the school was first established as Sultan Hassan Malay School (SMSH) in the Bruneian town of Bangar, named after Sultan Muhammad Hasan. A hostel that was planned and then under construction was delayed in 1967. As of that same year, the school had only two classes and was under the leadership of the acting principal of Sekolah Menengah Melayu Pertama (First Malay Secondary School). In c. 1972, it was renamed to Sultan Hassan Malay Secondary School. The school moved to a new building, which was built around 1984 and began operation in 1986.

In accordance with the National Development Plan, Abu Bakar Apong revealed plans for a new secondary school in Kampong Rataie on 12 November 2011. He clarified that after it was finished, pupils from SMSH would be able to attend. He added that the Ministry of Education was considering options and talked about efforts to keep an institution in the area, either a secondary or vocational school. He examined SMSH's facilities during his visit in response to complaints of hazardous circumstances, such as unstable soil in the administrative buildings. Classrooms were equipped with portable cabins as a safety precaution, and more cabins are planned in the future. He emphasized plans to add these new facilities and move SMSH to a single school session.

Beginning on 1 March 2023, classes would be held in the new SMSH facility in Kampong Batu Apoi. The renovation project aligned with the Ministry of Education's (MoE) long-term goals and desire to offer a more hospitable and high-quality educational infrastructure. Earlier on 20 February, the new building was turned over to the ministry. There are 714 pupils, 80 teachers, and 16 support staff members in attendance at the new building.

The school provides five years of secondary education, leading up to GCE 'O' Level qualification.

== Facilities ==
Facilities at the Batu Apoi complex include a football field, a parking lot, a drop-off area, an assembly area, a multipurpose hall, classrooms, a science lab, a library, a surau, canteens, and dining halls.

== Notable alumni ==
- Pengiran Mohammad Abdul Rahman, Deputy Minister of Religious Affairs and 2008 S.E.A. Write Award recipient

== See also ==
- List of secondary schools in Brunei
