= Zain Serudin =

Bruneian writer and politician (1936–2025)

Yang Dimuliakan Pehin Jawatan Luar Pekerma Raja Dato Seri Utama Zain Serudin DK PSSUB DSLJ PHBS PBLI PJK PKL
- زاين سرودين
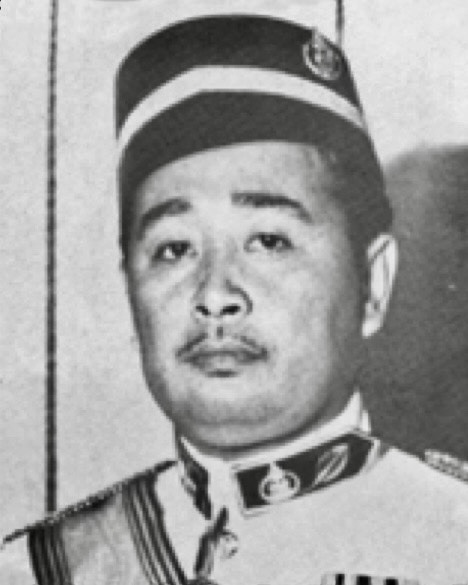
- Zain, c. 1970

1st Minister of Religious Affairs
- In office 20 October 1986 – 29 May 2010
- Monarch: Hassanal Bolkiah
- Deputy: Yahya Ibrahim; Badaruddin Othman
- Preceded by: Office established
- Succeeded by: Pengiran Mohammad

3rd State Religious Affairs Officer
- In office 1 November 1970 – 1 January 1984
- Preceded by: Pengiran Anak Kemaluddin
- Succeeded by: Office abolished

Personal details
- Born: 30 August 1936 Kampong Lurong Sikuna, Kampong Ayer, Brunei
- Died: 1 June 2025 (aged 88) Kampong Jerudong, Brunei–Muara, Brunei
- Party: PRB (1962)
- Spouse: Yukmas Mohammad (m. 1964)
- Education: Madrasah Aljunied Al-Islamiah; Kolej Islam Malaya
- Alma mater: Al-Azhar University (BA)
- Profession: Politician; poet
- Awards: Mastera Literary Award; S.E.A. Write Award

Mohammad Zain bin Haji Serudin (30 August 1936 – 1 June 2025), also known by his pen name Shukri Zain, was a Bruneian aristocrat, poet and politician. He served as minister of religious affairs from 1986 to 2010 and was president of the Brunei Youth Council (MPPB) between 1968 and 1976. From 2011 until his death, he was also a member of the Privy Council.

Zain made contributions to Islamic literature, religious discourse, and culture. His impact on Malay-Islamic literature was particularly evident through his Islamic poetry, which reflects his deep engagement with Islamic themes. Using the Malay language as a medium for his poetic expression, Zain has contributed extensively to Islamic literary traditions. His influence was further underscored by his publications, travels, and involvement in shaping the Islamic philosophy of the Melayu Islam Beraja (MIB) in the early 1970s.

== Early life and education ==
Zain bin Haji Serudin was born on 30 August 1936 in Kampong Lurong Sikuna, a village within Kampong Ayer. He was the son of Haji Serudin bin Hashim and Hajjah Tikah bte Merali. Zain has several brothers, including Dato Paduka Haji Mohammad, who served as the land commissioner from 1976 to 1983, Dato Paduka Haji Omar, the permanent secretary at the Ministry of Home Affairs, and Dato Paduka Haji Abas, the permanent secretary at the Ministry of Law.

He began his early education in Brunei before pursuing further studies at Madrasah Aljunied Al-Islamiah in Singapore from 1950 to 1955 and later at Kolej Islam Malaya in Klang from 1956 to 1959. In 1960, he became the first Bruneian sent by the government to Al-Azhar University in Cairo, where he earned a bachelor's degree in shariah, graduating in 1963.

== Political career ==
=== Early career ===
Upon returning from Egypt, Zain won the Tanjong Maya seat with 277 votes as a Partai Rakyat Brunei candidate during the 1962 Bruneian district council election. In November 1963, Zain began working with the government and was appointed deputy chief kadi in December 1963. He quickly gained recognition as an influential public speaker and became one of the newly educated ulama who began taking on significant roles in Brunei's religious institutions. This marked a gradual shift from the traditional leadership dominated by the Pengiran social class to positions held by those with modern Islamic education.

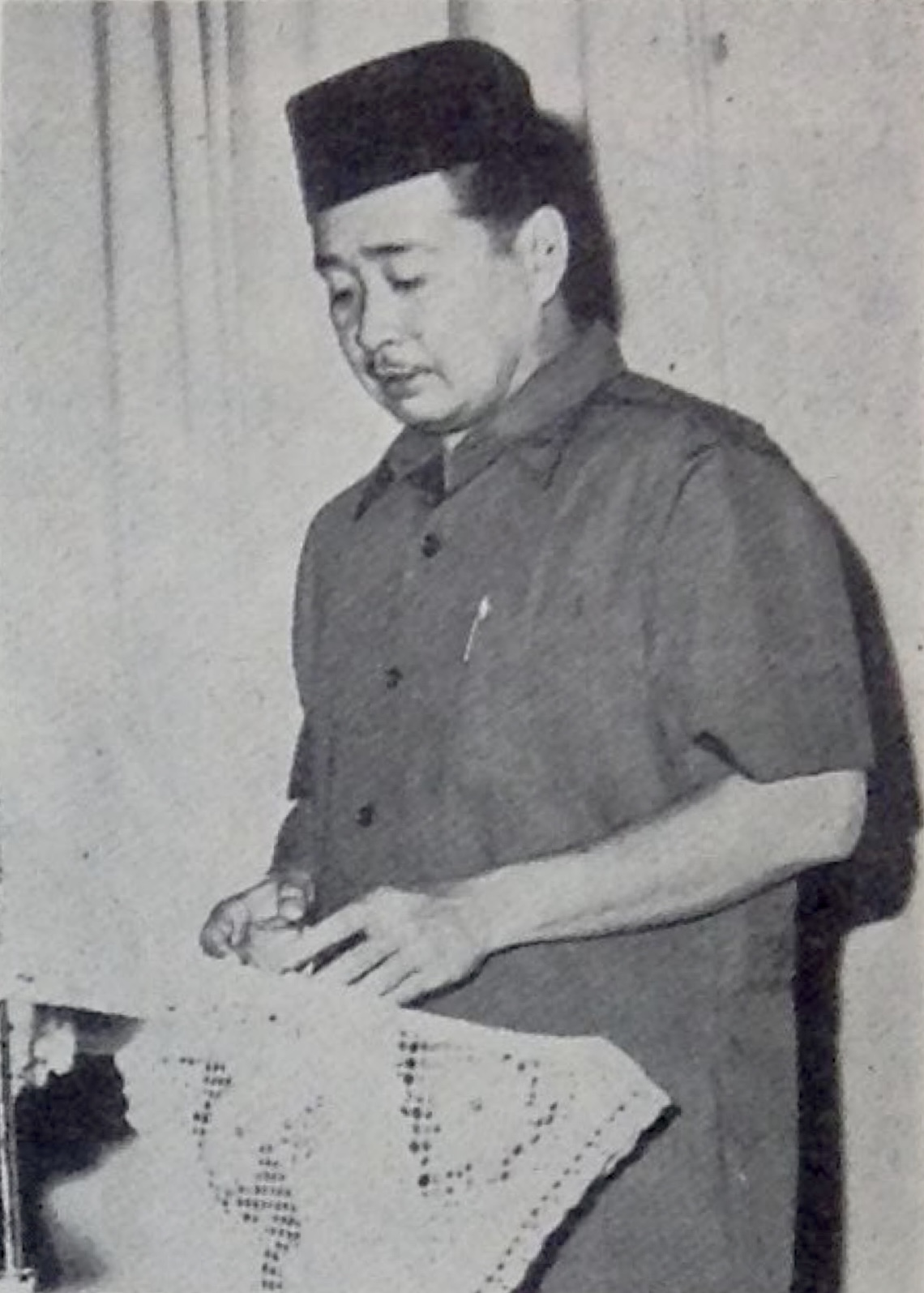
Zain speaking at a Nuzul Al-Quran celebration in 1973

In 1965, Zain was appointed secretary to the Department of Religious Affairs and was later promoted to grand kadi in October 1967. In 1968, he became president of the MPPB, a position he held until 1976. From 1 November 1970 to 1 January 1984, he served as the state religious affairs officer. During this time, the religious primary school curriculum in Brunei was considered lengthy and disorganised, resulting in many students failing their exams due to the extensive reading requirements. This led to reforms in the curriculum and textbooks from the mid-1970s. Zain, along with Yahya Ibrahim and Amin Abdul Rahim, played a key role in developing new textbooks. He authored works such as Tarikh I, Kitab Pelajaran Ibadat Siri I–III, and Zainuttalib Siri I–VII, replacing the previously used Kitab Matla'al Al-Badrain.

=== Minister of Religious Affairs ===
After the death of his father, Sultan Hassanal Bolkiah revealed a new cabinet on 20 October 1986 through Radio Television Brunei. This reshuffle led to the creation of thirteen ministerial positions, with Zain appointed minister of religious affairs. Despite the changes, the sultan reaffirmed that government policies would remain consistent.

In his Borneo Bulletin speech on syariah law on 14 June 1995, Zain highlighted how Brunei's legal system was shaped by the MIB worldview. In an effort to lessen the power of the secular common law courts left over from colonial control, he promoted the elevation of Islamic laws to their proper place as the main body of law. MIB's overarching objective of bolstering Brunei's Islamic identity and sovereignty is reflected in this position.

Zain announced that the government had allocated B$11.3 million to supply computers to every school in Brunei, a move he highlighted during the tenth Teachers' Day celebration on 23 September 2000. He also supported the idea of streamlining academic and religious education under the Ministry of Education to unify the country's educational system. On 26 March 2001, Zain enacted the Islamic Adoption of Children Order.

On 24 May 2005, Zain retained his position as minister of religious affairs following a cabinet reshuffle by the sultan. In 2008, he made several appearances on Brunei's radio and television, emphasizing the importance of religious principles. Under the 2007–2012 National Development Plan, the Ministry of Religious Affairs (MoRA) began preparations to build eight mosques and six religious schools, with a budget exceeding B$42 million. Zain also welcomed Ahmad Zahid Hamidi and other high-ranking officials during their visit to MoRA in July 2008.

On 22 March 2010, Zain rejected a proposal by Goh King Chin to create a tourist "alcohol zone," warning that such a move would provoke Allah's wrath, affecting not only those who drink but the entire nation. He reiterated that public alcohol consumption is prohibited in Brunei, with the exception of non-Muslim tourists who are allowed to bring in small amounts for personal use. Zain cautioned that establishing an alcohol zone would tarnish Brunei's reputation as a deeply pious nation and could lead to further unwelcome proposals, such as areas for clubs or prostitution. He stressed the importance of preserving Brunei's image as the "Abode of Peace." Following a cabinet reshuffle, Zain was replaced by Pengiran Mohammad as minister of religious affairs on 29 May 2010.

== Later life ==
After his tenure as minister, Zain continued to contribute significantly to Brunei's religious and cultural landscape. On 16 February 2011, he was the honoured guest at the Dikir Syarafil Anam event at Universiti Brunei Darussalam (UBD), where he delivered a lecture celebrating the Prophet Muhammad's legacy. Later, on 7 April, he was appointed a member of the Privy Council. As a member of the MIB Supreme Council, Zain actively promoted the MIB philosophy through seminars in Bangar and Belait in November 2011. He emphasised loyalty to leadership, the importance of just governance, and fostering community cohesion. His efforts aimed to deepen public understanding of the MIB concept while instilling patriotism and unity in the nation.

On 28 February 2012, at the MIB International Conference, Zain presented a paper on the MIB concept's historical and constitutional roots, linking it to Sultan Muhammad Shah's conversion to Islam, and emphasised its role in fostering cohesion and moderation. On 4 July 2013, in Kuala Belait, he urged parents, especially mothers, to instil moral and religious values in their children, inspired by Qur'anic figures like Siti Maryam, reflecting his commitment to Brunei's vision as a "Negara Zikir."

== Personal life and death ==
Zain was fluent in Malay, Arabic, and English. He married Datin Seri Laila Jasa Hajah Yukmas binti Mohammad in 1964, and together they have three children. He resided at No. 166, KM 8.5, Jalan Pasir Berakas, Lambak Kanan.

On the evening of 1 June 2025, Zain died at the Pantai Jerudong Specialist Centre, at the age of 88. The following day, funeral prayers were held at Kampong Lambak, led by Salim Besar. Crown Prince Al-Muhtadee Billah attended the prayers and carried the casket of the late minister. Also present were the minister of religious affairs, Badaruddin Othman, along with senior government officials.

== Literacy career ==
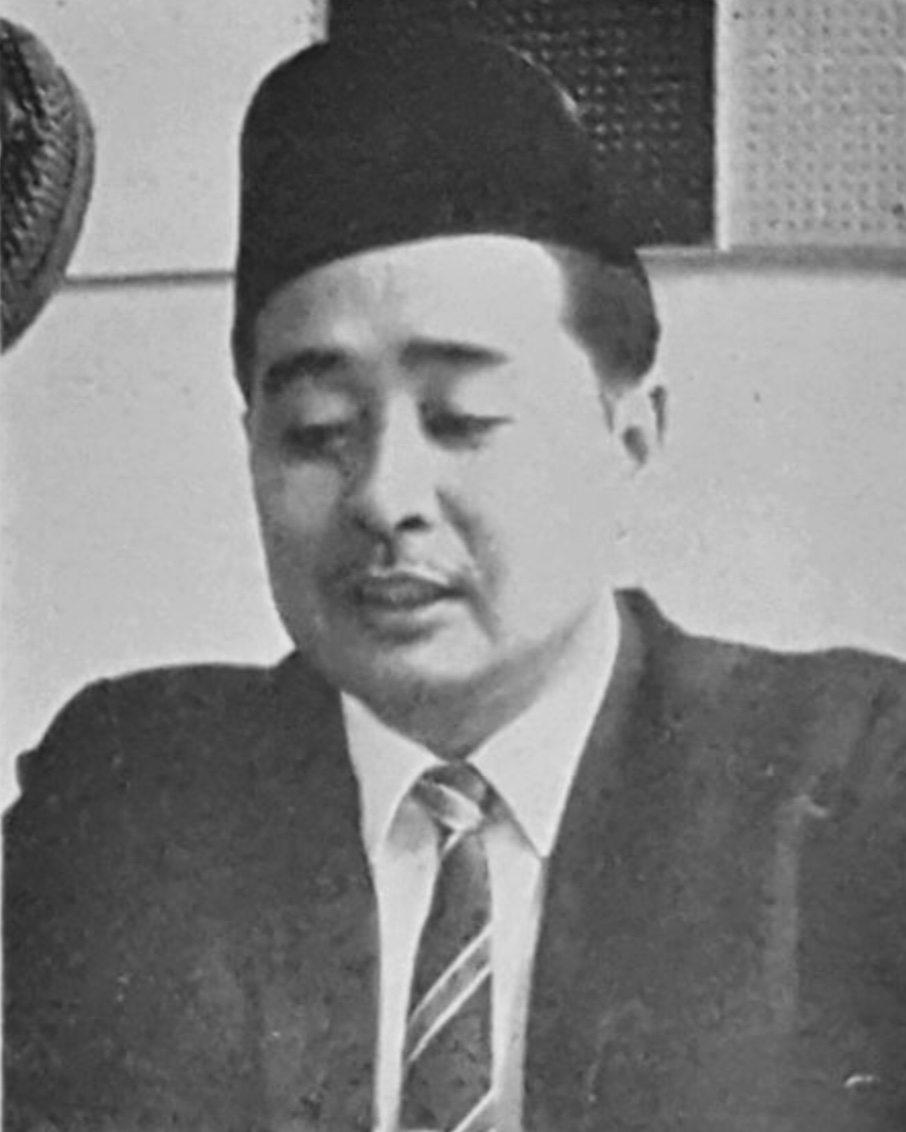
Zain, c. 1971

=== Themes ===
Zain wrote under various pseudonyms, including Md. Zain Brunei, Mara Siswa, and Shukri Zain, the latter being the most widely recognised. His poetry extols religious virtues, praises the Creator, and supports Islamic teachings. His works have been published in Brunei, Singapore, and Malaysia, with the Language and Literature Bureau in both Brunei and Malaysia, as well as the MoRA in Brunei, publishing his poems.

Islamic literature encourages piety, good deeds, healthy living, and values rooted in the Quran and Sunnah. Zain's talent in Islamic poetry aligns with these ideals. His works, which emphasise monotheism, faith in the prophethood of Muhammad, and the defence of justice, truth, and integrity, reflect Islamic values. Zain's writings uphold religious principles by highlighting the importance of spiritual growth, social responsibility, and self-awareness. For Zain, Islamic poetry serves as both a form of literary enjoyment and a reminder of one's obligations to the Creator, others, and oneself. His poetry reflects his belief that art must uphold moral values and truth, encouraging a lifestyle aligned with Islamic teachings.

Zain's poetry addresses a broad spectrum of themes, including marital love, the beauty of nature, human tragedy, and Islamic subjects such as prayer, purposeful living, closeness to Allah, resisting evil desires, and patriotism. His approach was moderate, making his works accessible and enjoyable. Even in poems not strictly Islamic, he weaves in Islamic elements, such as in his portrayal of the Taj Mahal and Kashmir, where he references Quranic verses and Islamic values. Zain also critiques societal issues, such as the destruction of food and the starvation in Africa, contrasting this with Islamic charity practices. His explicitly Islamic poems, like Not for Nothing and Work Ethics, encourage readers to lead purposeful, ethical lives in accordance with Islamic principles. Zain's poetry acts as a form of dakwah, gently persuading readers to live with faith, sincerity, and compassion, reflecting his belief in the importance of gratitude and kindness toward others.

=== Selected works ===
Zain authored several books, with some of his selected works including:

- Lambaian Islam. Bandar Seri Begawan: Jabatan Hal-Ehwal Ugama. 1971.
- Peranan Ugama Dalam Pentadbiran Kerajaan. Bandar Seri Begawan: Bahagian Penerangan, Jabatan Setiausaha Kerajaan. 1982.
- Sembahyang: Kadza Dan Sunat. Bandar Seri Begawan: Jabatan Hal Ehwal Ugama. 1982.
- Brunei Darussalam: Persepsi Sejarak dan Masyarakatnya. Bandar Seri Begawan: Azza Press. 1992.
- Pengajian Islam Di Brunei: Satu Tinjauan. Bandar Seri Begawan: Pusat Da'wah Islamiah. 1998.
- Melayu Islam Beraja: Satu Pendekatan. Bandar Seri Begawan: Dewan Bahasa dan Pustaka. 1998. ISBN 978-99917-0-092-2.
- Brunei an Islamic Nation: Islamic Background. Bandar Seri Begawan: Islamic Da'wah Centre. 2000. ISBN 978-99917-35-16-0.
- Mengangkat Martabat Bangsa. Bandar Seri Begawan: Pusat Da'wah Islamiah. 2007. ISBN 978-99917-35-46-7.
- Zikir Menjana Masyarakat Bertaqwa. Bandar Seri Begawan: Pusat Da'wah Islamiah. 2009. ISBN 978-99917-35-99-3.
- Penghayatan Sastera Menjana Pemikiran Ummah. Bandar Seri Begawan: Pusat Da'wah Islamiah. 2011. ISBN 978-99917-55-33-5.

== Titles, styles and honours ==
=== Titles and styles ===
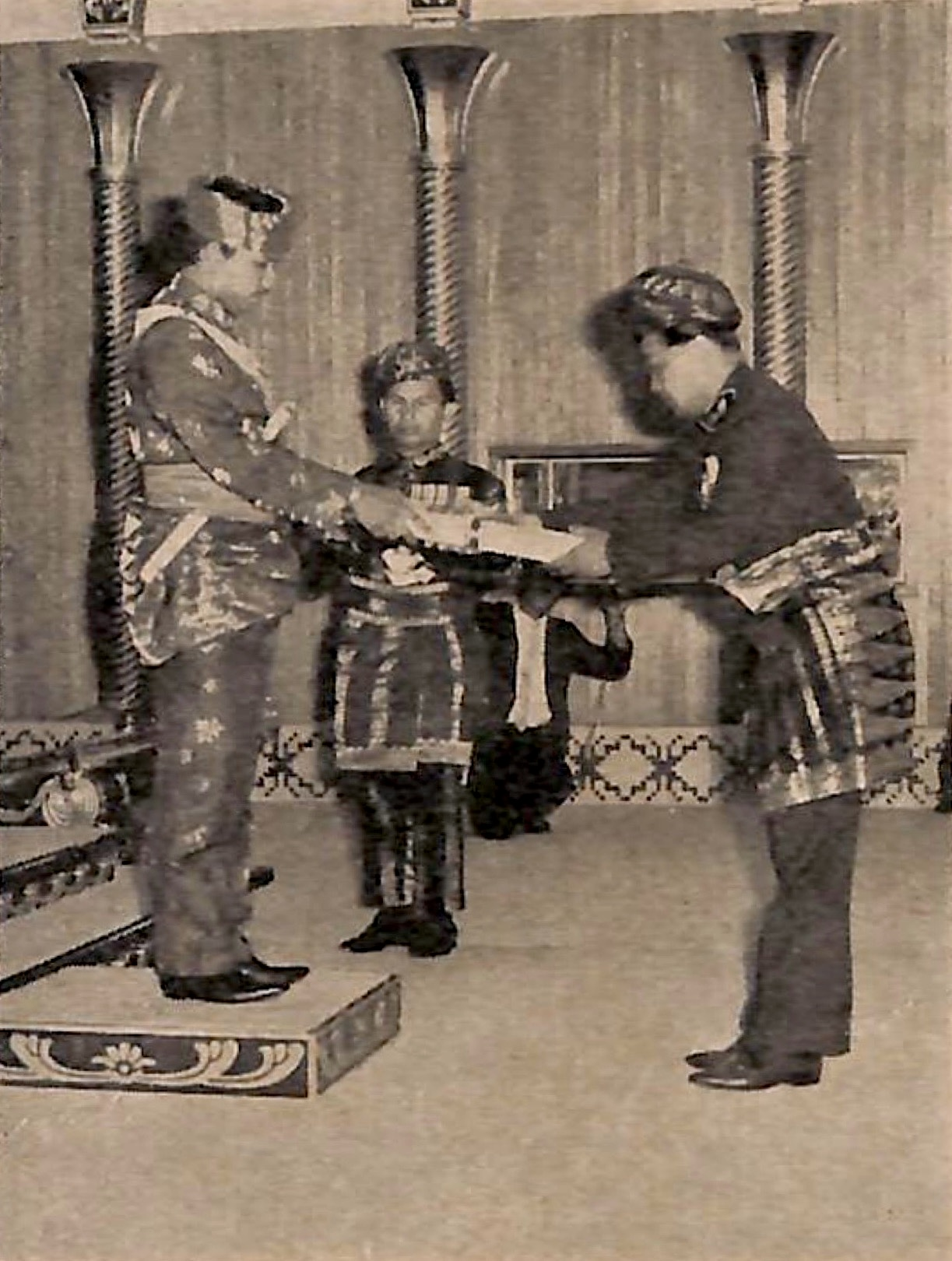
Zain (right) at the title bestowment ceremony held at the Lapau in 1969

On 31 January 1968, Zain was honoured by Sultan Hassanal Bolkiah with the manteri title of Pehin Orang Kaya Laila Wangsa. He was later elevated to the title of Pehin Orang Kaya Ratna Diraja on 15 July 1969, and eventually to Pehin Jawatan Luar Pekerma Raja on a subsequent date. Each of these titles carries the style Yang Dimuliakan.

=== Awards ===
Zain has been given the following awards:

- SEA Write Award (1991)
- Belia Berjasa (2006)
- Anugerah Penulisan Islam (API) (2011)
- Mastera Literary Award (2011)

=== Honours ===
Zain has been bestowed the following honours:

- Family Order of Seri Utama (DK; 7 January 1970) – Dato Seri Utama
- Order of Islam Brunei First Class (PSSUB) – Dato Paduka Seri Setia
- Order of Paduka Seri Laila Jasa Second Class (DSLJ; 17 May 1969) – Dato Seri Laila Jasa
- Sultan Hassanal Bolkiah Medal First Class (PHBS; 12 February 1969)
- Pingat Bakti Laila Ikhlas (PBLI; 20 February 2008)
- Meritorious Service Medal (PJK)
- Long Service Medal (PKL)
- Sultan of Brunei Silver Jubilee Medal (5 October 1992)

Political offices
Preceded by Office established	1st Minister of Religious Affairs; 20 October 1986 – 29 May 2010	Succeeded by Pengiran Mohammad
Preceded by Pengiran Anak Kemaluddin	3rd State Religious Affairs Officer; 1 November 1970 – 1 January 1984	Succeeded by Office abolished
