= Pengiran Mohammad Abdul Rahman =

Bruneian politician and writer

Dato Seri Setia Pengiran Mohammad PSNB DSSUB PIKB PKL
- ڤڠيرن محمد
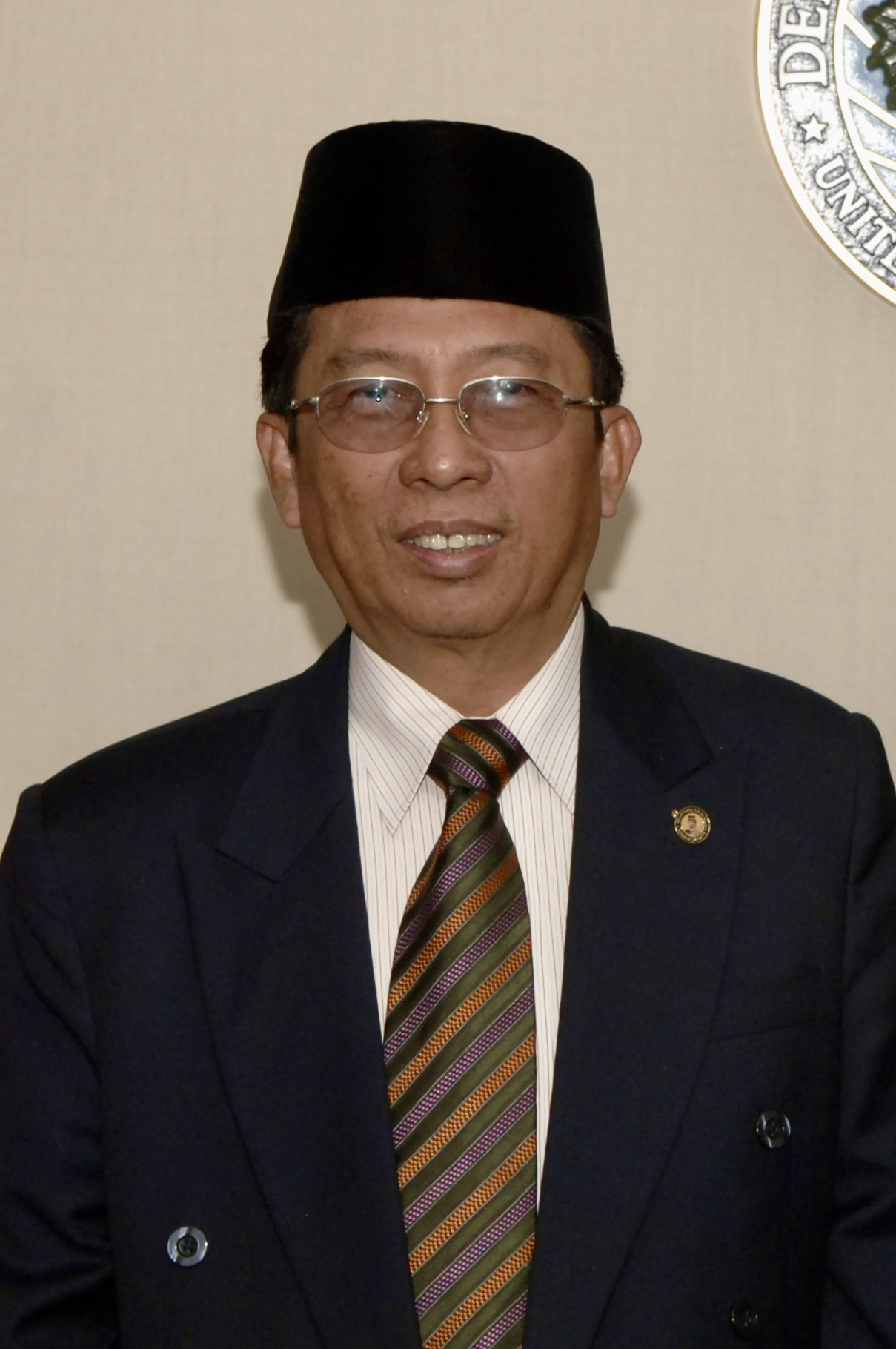
- Pengiran Mohammad in 2007

2nd Minister of Religious Affairs
- In office 29 May 2010 – 22 October 2015
- Monarch: Hassanal Bolkiah
- Deputy: Pengiran Bahrom
- Preceded by: Zain Serudin
- Succeeded by: Badaruddin Othman

3rd Deputy Minister of Education
- In office 24 May 2005 – 29 May 2010
- Minister: Abdul Rahman Taib
- Preceded by: Suyoi Osman
- Succeeded by: Yusoff Ismail

Personal details
- Born: Awangku Mohammad bin Pengiran Abdul Rahman; 1948 Kampong Menengah, Temburong, Brunei
- Education: Sultan Hassan Malay School
- Alma mater: Al-Azhar University (BA); National University of Malaysia (MA); University of Malaya (PhD)
- Profession: Politician; teacher; writer
- Awards: S.E.A. Write Award

Pengiran Mohammad bin Pengiran Haji Abdul Rahman (born 1948), pen name Zairis M.S., is a Bruneian politician and writer in the Government of Brunei whole formerly took office as the second Minister of Religious Affairs from 2010 to 2015, and Deputy Minister of Education from 2005 to 2010.

== Education ==
Awangku Mohammad is born in 1948, at Kampong Menengah of Temburong District. He was educated at Sultan Hassan Malay School from 1956 to 1959; Sultan Omar Ali Saifuddien College in 1959; Madrasah Alsagoff Al-Arabiah Arabic Singapore in 1959; Madrasah Aljunied Al-Islamiah Singapore from 1960 to 1965; Islamic College of Malaysia from 1965 to 1968; Malayan Islamic College from 1969 to 1970. He obtained his bachelor's degree, Usuluddin Faculty majoring in Creed and Philosophy at the Al-Azhar University Egypt from 1975 to 1979; master's degree in Islamic Studies at the National University of Malaysia from 1983 to 1986; Doctor of Philosophy at the University of Malaya from 1987 to 1992.

== Career ==
Pengiran Mohammad's career began as a religious teacher at the Raja Istri Pengiran Anak Damit Arabic Girls' Middle School in 1971. He would go on to serve several other positions such as a religious officer in 1979; Acting Superintendent of Preaching and Tabligh from 1981 to 1983; Senior Religious Officer in 1985; deputy director of the Ministry of Religious Affairs's (MORA) Institute of Islamic Studies in 1991; Director of the Institute of Islamic Studies in 1996; First Dean of the Sultan Haji Omar 'Ali Saifuddien Institute of Islamic Studies from 1999 to 2002; and Special Duties Officer (National Education Council) Ministry of Education in 2003.

In the 2010 Bruneian cabinet reshuffle, Pengiran Mohammad was appointed Deputy Minister of Education from 24 May 2005 to 29 May 2010; Interim Rector of Sultan Sharif Ali Islamic University in 2007.

On 29 May 2010, Hassanal Bolkiah, the Sultan of Brunei, announced the new cabinet shift and fresh appointments for a second five-year term. At 4 o'clock in the afternoon, it was declared in a titah that Pengiran Mohammad would be in charge of managing the duties of the new Minister of Religious Affairs. He spoke in the UNISSA Auditorium as part of the Center for the Advancement of Knowledge and Language's Special Malay Islamic Monarch (MIB), which was titled "History of the Arrival of Islam to Brunei Darussalam."

On 31 July 2015, Muhammad said that one must do the Hajj according to Islamic requirements in order to have a blessed Hajj. The ministry went on to say that when doing the Hajj, one should be extremely mindful of all rules, pillars, mandates, and prohibited behaviors. To provide instructions on how to carry out various Haj rites, including Tawaf, Sa'ie, Stoning of the Jamrah, and the proper manner to put on the ihram garment, six Haj practical facilitators have been selected.

Following the 2015 Bruneian cabinet reshuffle on 22 October, his tenure as minister came to an end.

== Personal life ==
Pengiran Mohammad is married to Datin Hajah Alimah binti Mohd Taib. Together they have 3 children; 2 sons and 1 daughter (Dayangku Saadatul Hannan). Additionally, his hobbies included reading, writing and table tennis.

Despite no official announcement being made, the Dewan Bahasa dan Pustaka website has labeled him as deceased, followed by another 2022 article.

== Books ==
He has co-authored several scholarly works and poetry anthologies alongside other authors and poets. at addition, he represented Brunei at the 10th World Poetry Festival in Kuala Lumpur, Malaysia, in 2004.

- Harga waktu (in Malay). Dewan Bahasa dan Pustaka Brunei. 1993.
- Islam di Brunei Darussalam (in Malay). Dewan Bahasa dan Pustaka Brunei. 2001. ISBN 9789991701813.
- Sastera Islam (in Malay). 2001.
- Salam takwa (in Malay). Dewan Bahasa dan Pustaka Brunei. 2006. ISBN 9789991704760.
- Madah remaja (in Malay). Dewan Bahasa dan Pustaka Brunei. 2006.
- Haji Othman, Badaruddin (2006). Madah remaja (in Malay). Dewan Bahasa dan Pustaka Brunei.
- Islam di Brunei Darussalam zaman British, 1774-1984 (in Malay). Dewan Bahasa dan Pustaka Brunei. 2007. ISBN 9789991705576.
- Kupasan puisi pilihan (in Malay). Dewan Bahasa dan Pustaka Brunei. 2008. ISBN 9789991705620.
- Rinduku (in Malay). Dewan Bahasa dan Pustaka Brunei. 2008. ISBN 9789991705682.
- Belia dan pendidikan Islam di Brunei Darussalam (in Malay). Pusat Daʼwah Islamiah. 2011. ISBN 9789991755434.
- Tamadun Melayu Islam di alam Melayu (in Malay). Pusat Daʼwah Islamiah. 2011. ISBN 9789991755410.
- 3 penyair pemikir Muslim (in Malay). Pusat Daʼwah Islamiah. 2011. ISBN 9789991755427.
- Kegemilangan Islam di Brunei Darussalam (in Malay). Pusat Penerbitan. 2012.
- Ikhtisar kefahaman Ahli sunnah wal jama'ah dan kesan-kesannya di Negara Brunei Darussalam (in Malay). Pusat Da'wah Islamiah. 2012. ISBN 9789991755250.
- Puisi dan intisari (in Malay). Pusat Daʼwah Islamiah. 2014. ISBN 9789991762395.
- Puisi dan intisari (in Malay). Fajar Islam di Borneo. 2015. ISBN 9789991762685.

== Awards and honours ==
Pengiran Mohammad has earned the following awards and honours:

=== Awards ===
- S.E.A Write Award (30 September 2008)
- Islamic Literature Award Finalist (5 November 2008)

=== Honours ===
- Order of Setia Negara Brunei First Class (PSNB) – Dato Seri Setia (15 July 2011)
- Order of Islam Brunei Second Class (DSSUB) – Dato Seri Setia (15 July 2003)
- Excellent Service Medal (PIKB)
- Long Service Medal (PKL)
- Silver Jubilee Medal (5 October 1992)
- Sultan of Brunei Golden Jubilee Medal (5 October 2017)

Political offices
Preceded by Zain Serudin	2nd Minister of Religious Affairs; 29 May 2010 – 22 October 2015	Succeeded by Badaruddin Othman
Preceded by Suyoi Osman	3rd Deputy Minister of Education; 24 May 2005 – 29 May 2010	Succeeded by Yusoff Ismail
Academic offices
Preceded by Office established	Rector of Sultan Sharif Ali Islamic University; 2007–2009	Succeeded by Yusop Damit
