= Duli Pengiran Muda Al-Muhtadee Billah College =

College in Gadong, Brunei

- Maktab Duli Pengiran Muda Al-Muhtadee Billah

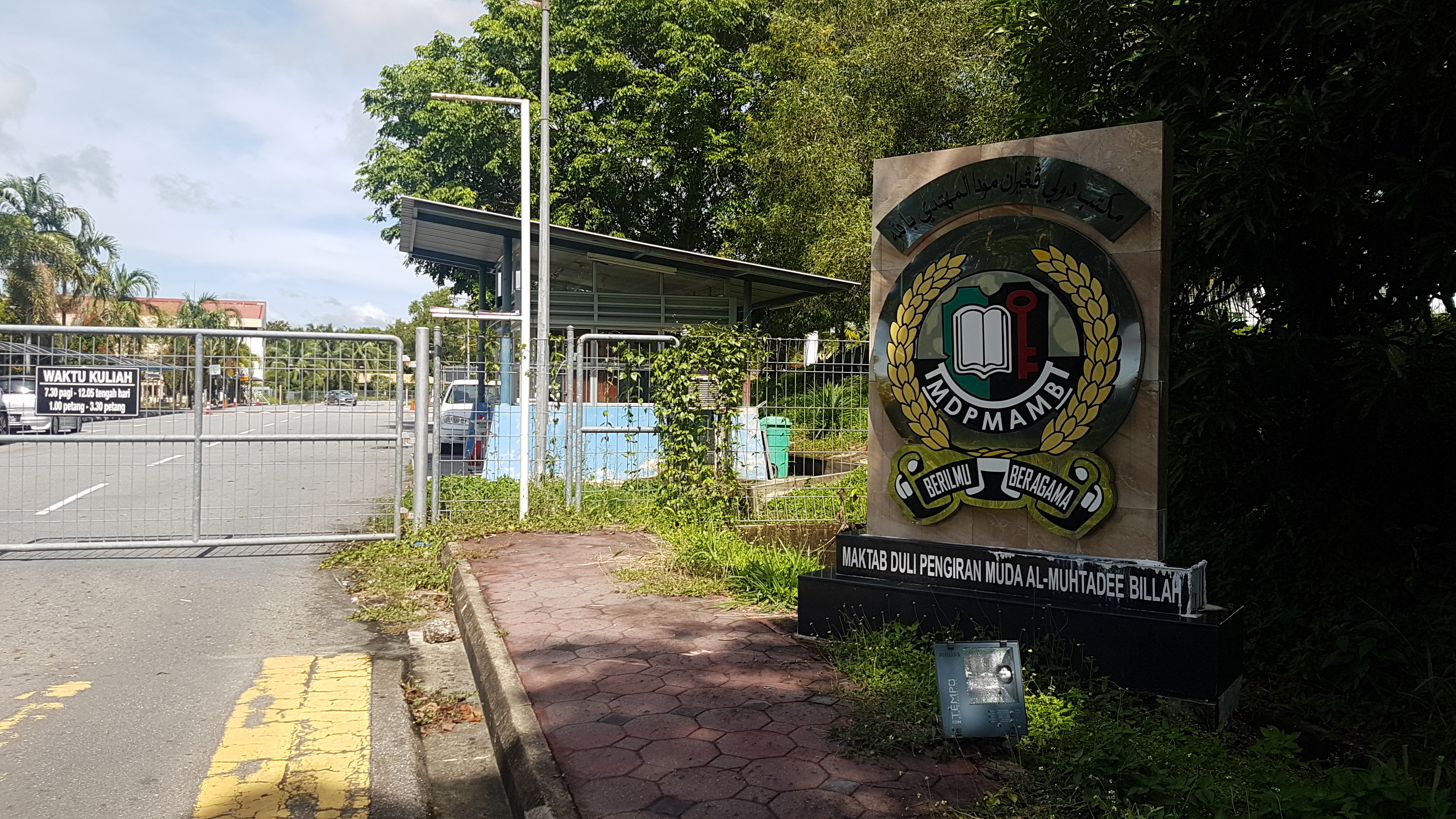
- The college's entrance

Location
- Simpang 373–17, Jalan Pasar Gadong, Bandar Seri Begawan, BE1318; Brunei
- Coordinates: 4°54′09.0″N 114°54′47.0″E

Information
- Former name: Sixth Form Centre (1974–1986)
- School type: Public sixth form
- Motto: Berilmu, Beragama (Knowledgeable, Religious)
- Established: 1974
- School district: Cluster 1
- Authority: Ministry of Education
- Principal: Monaliza Abdul Halim
- Years offered: 12-13
- Gender: Coeducational
- Houses: 4
- Yearbook: Memori MD
- Affiliation: CIE
- Website: Official Instagram

The Duli Pengiran Muda Al-Muhtadee Billah College (MDPMAMB or Maktab Duli Pengiran Muda Al-Muhtadee Billah), colloquially known as Maktab Duli (MD), is a government sixth form college located at Jalan Pasar Gadong in Bandar Seri Begawan, Brunei. Established in 1974, it is the first sixth form centre in the country, and has since provided sixth form education leading up to GCE A Level qualification.

== Etymology ==
Al-Muhtadee Billah, the oldest son of Sultan Hassanal Bolkiah and Queen Saleha, was born on 17 February 1974, and is honoured with the college's name. As the first in Succession to the Bruneian throne, he has the title of Duli Yang Teramat Mulia Paduka Seri Pengiran Muda Mahkota. He is considered the second most important person in the political structure and will eventually head the state and government.

== History ==
In 1974, the Sixth Form Centre (Pusat Tingkatan Enam) was established in order to accept pupils who have finished Form 5 in secondary education. On 5 January 1975, A. D. Bumford announced that the first intake of 245 students, who were graduates of Sultan Omar Ali Saifuddien College, Paduka Seri Begawan Malay College, and Arabic Secondary School, would be attending classes at a temporary site at Jalan Muara, which was shared with Paduka Seri Begawan Malay College. The new institution, which will include a 40 acres (16 ha) university college and a 35 acre sixth form center, will be built on a 75 acre plot of land next to Sultan Hassanal Bolkiah Teachers College in Gadong.

Abdul Saman Kahar is the centre's first principal, while Awangku Mat Zain Lampoh is the deputy principal. Additionally, it was stated that the institution has hired 40 qualified sixth form instructors from the United Kingdom; of these, 20 are anticipated to arrive in Brunei during the same month, while the other 12 are anticipated to come in February. The government has given the centre B$10,000,000 to pay the operating costs. In 1976, the school commemorated a momentous event when 26 Malay-medium students from the initial intake were awarded government scholarships by Sultan Hassanal Bolkiah to pursue further education in the United Kingdom. The centre moved to its current B$26,000,000 campus in Gadong, an 88 acres (36 ha) property, in 1979.

On 17 April 1986, the centre formally changed its name to Duli Pengiran Muda Al-Muhtadee Billah College (Maktab Duli Pengiran Muda Al-Muhtadee Billah). There were 1100 college students enrolled in 2015. The college stated on 4 January 2022, that the Student Learning Center (SLC) was renamed as Student Learning Service Center (SLSC).

== Academic life ==
Maktab Duli marked the beginning of pre-university studies with a three-day orientation event for incoming students, which is conducted at the college auditorium. The curriculum attempts to provide pupils a head start and an overview of the academic and social activities of the sixth form institution. Parents are present for the first-day event, which featured readings from the Quran, the college principal's address, and the national hymn and alma mater music. In addition, students received a tour of the institution and an overview of Maktab Duli's policies, resources, and services.

The Higher Education Unit (HEU) hosts the Maktab Duli Studyrama every year as a higher education and career fair to inform institutions' students about the courses that are available after finishing their A-level. A one-day Knowledge Educators Symposium with the topic "Quality Education as the Core of Learners' Excellence" was organized by Maktab Duli in 2022. The purpose of the event, which was organized by the MDPMAMB Teachers' Professional Development (TPD) Section and hosted at the SLSC, was to advance knowledge via the exchange of professional and scientific information.

Maktab Duli has collaborated with several organisations and institutions, including the JENESYS Programme (Japan-East Asia Network of Exchange for Students and Youths), the Brunei Students' Union in the UK and Eire (BSU), the Brunei Religious Officers' Students Association (BruROSA), Northumbria University, and the Study in Professional Institutions (SPIN) initiative under the Manpower Planning and Employment Council (MPEC).

The four sporting houses of Maktab Duli are Putera Negara, Indera Negara, Setia Negara, and Kesuma Negara. Sports like tug of war are played on the college field.

== Campus ==
On 6 June 2011, the Maktab Duli PMAMB library moved to the new Library, Science, and ICT building (SIT). Previously, it was housed in the SLC building next to the administrative building. Lending, self-checkout, book drop service, reservations, OPAC, photocopying, reading/study areas, computers, cyberzone, binding, printing services, gallery, archive, viewing/audiovisual, and prayer rooms are just a few of the many amenities and services that the library provides.

The Ministry of Education's Department of Special Education has several units based at Maktab Duli, including the Training and Resources Unit, Data Management Unit, Assessment and Evaluation Unit, Learning Support Unit (Secondary), Curriculum Unit, Support Services for Hearing Impairment (HI), and Support Services for Visual Impairment (VI).

== Notable people ==
=== Notable staff ===
- Janin Erih, lecturer at Sixth Form Centre
- Yusoff Ismail, head religious teacher at Sixth Form Centre
