= Pengiran Bahrom =

Bruneian politician and educator (born 1963)

Dato Seri Paduka Pengiran Bahrom SPMB SSUB SUB PJK
- ڤڠيرن بهروم
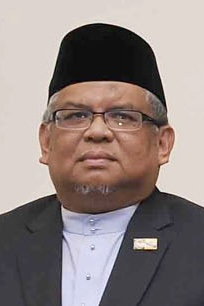
- Pengiran Bahrom in 2016

3rd Deputy Minister of Religious Affairs
- In office 30 January 2018 – 7 June 2022
- Monarch: Hassanal Bolkiah
- Minister: Badaruddin Othman
- Preceded by: Abdul Mokti Daud
- Succeeded by: Pengiran Mohammad Tashim
- In office 29 May 2010 – 22 October 2015
- Minister: Pengiran Mohammad
- Preceded by: Badaruddin Othman
- Succeeded by: Abdul Mokti Daud

5th Deputy Minister of Education
- In office 22 October 2015 – 30 January 2018
- Minister: Suyoi Osman
- Preceded by: Yusoff Ismail
- Succeeded by: Romaizah Salleh

Personal details
- Born: 21 December 1963 (age 62) Tasek Meradun, Brunei Town, Brunei
- Education: Madrasah Aljunied Al-Islamiah
- Alma mater: Al-Azhar University; Universiti Brunei Darussalam; University of Jordan
- Profession: Politician; civil servant; educator

Pengiran Bahrom bin Pengiran Haji Bahar (born 21 December 1963) is a politician and educator from Brunei who served as the country's Deputy Minister of Religious Affairs twice, from 2010 to 2015 and from 2018 to 2022, as well as Deputy Minister of Education from 2015 to 2018. Additionally, he was the deputy chairman of Seri Begawan Religious Teachers University College (KUPU SB), Institut Tahfiz Al-Quran Sultan Haji Hassanal Bolkiah in c. 2013 and a member of Sultan Haji Hassanal Bolkiah Foundation's board of directors from 2021 to 2023.

== Early life and education ==
Pengiran Bahrom bin Pengiran Haji Bahar, born on 21 December 1963, is originally from Kampong Tasek Meradun, Brunei Town.

His educational journey began at Bendahara Sakam Bunut Malay School from 1967 to 1972, followed by Raja Isteri Pengiran Anak Damit Girls' Arabic Religious School from 1973 to 1976, and Hassanal Bolkiah Boys' Arabic School from 1977 to 1979. He then attended Madrasah Aljunied Al-Islamiah in Singapore from 1980 to 1982. He earned his Bachelor of Arts in Usuluddin, Tafsir from Al-Azhar University in Cairo, Egypt, from 1983 to 1987, and later obtained a Postgraduate Certificate in Education (PGCE) from Universiti Brunei Darussalam (UBD) from 1993 to 1994. He completed his Master of Arts in Usuluddin, Hadith at University of Jordan in Amman, Jordan, from 1997 to 2001.

== Early career ==
Pengiran Bahrom worked as a Religious Education Officer at the Ministry of Religious Affairs (MoRA) from January 1988 until April 1995, where he served as teaching staff at the Bandar Seri Begawan Arabic Preparatory School from 1988 to 1989. He then taught at the KUPU SB from 1989 to 1991. He also served as the Principal of Ma'had Islam Brunei from 1991 to 1993.

After that, he was appointed Secretary of the Brunei Islamic Religious Council (MUIB) at MoRA in April 1995 and held that position until July 2003. From August 2003 to October 2005, he was the assistant director of Mosque Affairs at MoRA. He was a minister in the Bruneian government before becoming the Deputy Permanent Secretary at MoRA. Prior to holding ministerial roles in the Bruneian administration, he worked as the Deputy Permanent secretary at MoRA.

== Ministerial career ==
The appointment of Pengiran Bahrom as deputy minister of religious affairs in the 2010 Bruneian cabinet reshuffle on 29 May, marked a major change in his professional career. He delivered his inaugural lecture to new students during UBD's orientation week on 5 January 2011, marking the first time he addressed students in this capacity at the monthly Ulum Ad-Din Talk.

On 22 October 2015, Pengiran Bahrom was reappointed as Deputy Minister of Education, succeeding Yusoff Ismail, following a cabinet reshuffle announced by Sultan Hassanal Bolkiah. On 19 January 2016, he underlined the value of incorporating 21st century abilities into the curriculum to prepare students for global competitiveness while emphasising the significance that historical knowledge has in moulding the future.

On 6 July 2017, Pengiran Bahrom stressed the importance of developing speaking and listening skills as fundamental to enhancing critical thinking and communication, while encouraging students to participate in events like the Malay Forum Competition to further their potential and acquire essential soft skills for future success. Later on the 10th, he oversaw the flag handover ceremony for Brunei's contingent participating in the 9th ASEAN School Games in Singapore, which involved 18 athletes competing in ping pong, sepak takraw, and tenpin bowling. In September, he attended the opening ceremony of the 23rd ASEAN Council of Japan Alumni (ASCOJA) Conference in Brunei, which focused on strengthening ASEAN–Japan relations through discussions on culture, education, and the Halal industry.

On 30 October 2017, Pengiran Bahrom stated the crucial role of school leaders in implementing national education policies and fostering the values of the Malay Islamic Monarchy philosophy, while highlighting the Ministry of Education's (MoE) effort to refresh leadership by appointing and transferring new principals and headmasters for 2018. As Acting Minister of Education, he stressed the importance of school leadership in putting into practice successful education programs and initiatives at the 2017 Opening of the School Leaders Conference. He underlined the need for leaders to uphold the values of Islam and the Melayu Islam Beraja (MIB), drive quality education, and align with the national education agenda.

During the closing of the 5th International Conference on Islamic Education and Arabic Language Research on 25 January 2018, Pengiran Bahrom underlined the need for educators to integrate strong faith and global awareness in shaping individuals and society.

On 30 January 2018, Pengiran Bahrom was reappointed as Deputy Minister of Religious Affairs during a cabinet reshuffle announced by Sultan Hassanal Bolkiah. In a ceremony held at Istana Nurul Iman on 1 February, he took the oath of office as the deputy minister for Brunei's new cabinet. On 8 February, he visited flood-hit mosques in Tutong District, where he met with displaced families at Tanjong Maya Mosque. There, he gave the afflicted people the daily essentials. He urged aspiring pilgrims to enroll in the 12-week hajj courses offered in all four districts in April 2018 to prepare for their journey to Makkah.

At the 2019 Knowledge Council Forum, Pengiran Bahrom led the welcome prayer and highlighted the theme "Islamic Manuscripts as a Landmark of Human Civilisation," highlighting the significance of these manuscripts as intellectual treasures and reflections of past civilisations. During the Annual Haj Management Meeting in Makkah on 18 December, the Bruneian delegation was headed by him to thank the Saudi Arabian government for their exceptional hajj management and hospitality.

As part of MUIB's strategic investment strategy for socioeconomic development in Brunei Darussalam, Pengiran Bahrom attended the foundation stone laying ceremony for a new two-story home in Kampong Mumong on 13 February 2020, in his capacity as chairman of the Tanmiah Property Agency's Steering Committee. On 11 June, he visited the newly re-opened Arabic Preparatory School Bandar Seri Begawan and Hassanal Bolkiah Arabic Boys' Secondary School to review their operations following a two-month closure due to the COVID-19 pandemic. On 13 July, Pengiran Bahrom inaugurated the new Jalan Bedil Religious School building in Kampong Lambak after receiving the keys from the Deputy Minister Marzuke Mohsin during a handover ceremony.

Pengiran Bahrom was replaced as Deputy Minister of Religious Affairs by Pengiran Mohammad Tashim in a cabinet reshuffle ordered by Sultan Hassanal Bolkiah on 7 June 2022.

== Other works ==
Pengiran Bahrom has actively participated in numerous seminars, conventions, conferences, and forums both locally and internationally. He has presented papers at various significant events, including the 2005 Youth Seminar in Brunei, the 2006 Mosque and Surau Management Convention in Sarawak, the International Halal Seminar in Brunei, and the National Waqf Convention in Malaysia. Other notable contributions include presentations at the Southeast Asia Zakat Seminar in Indonesia, the Islamic Education Convention in Brunei, and the School Leaders Conference in 2017.

== Honours ==
In June 2022, MoRA held an appreciation ceremony for Pengiran Bahrom, recognising his service as Deputy Minister of Religious Affairs from January 2018 to June 2022. Additionally, he has earned the following honours;

- Order of Seri Paduka Mahkota Brunei First Class (SPMB; 15 July 2017) – Dato Seri Paduka
- Order of Seri Paduka Mahkota Brunei Second Class (DPMB; 15 July 2011) – Dato Paduka
- Order of Islam Brunei Third Class (SSUB; 15 July 2010)
- Order of Islam Brunei Fourth Class (SUB; 2003)
- Meritorious Service Medal (PJK; 2007)

Political offices
Preceded by Abdul Mokti Daud; Badaruddin Othman	3rd Deputy Minister of Religious Affairs; 30 January 2018 – 7 June 2022; 29 May 2010 – 22 October 2015	Succeeded by Pengiran Mohammad Tashim; Abdul Mokti Daud
Preceded by Yusoff Ismail	5th Deputy Minister of Education; 22 October 2015 – 30 January 2018	Succeeded by Romaizah Salleh
