= Seri Begawan Religious Teachers University College =

Public university college in Brunei

- Kolej Universiti Perguruan Ugama Seri Begawan (Malay) كوليج اونيۏرسيتي ڤرڬوروان أڬام سري بيڬاوان (Jawi)
- Logo of KUPU SB
- Motto: علم الإنسان ما لم يعلم (Qur'an 96:5)
- Motto in English: He (Allah) teaches man what he does not know (Qur'an 96:5)
- Type: Public teacher-training university college
- Established: 20 January 2007
- Founder: Sultan Hassanal Bolkiah
- Affiliations: APUCEN; CAPEU
- Religious affiliation: Sunni Islam
- Chairman: Pengiran Mohammad Tashim
- Chancellor: Sultan Hassanal Bolkiah
- Ra'es: Dr. Haji Arman bin Haji Asmad
- Academic staff: 50 (2024)
- Undergraduates: 779 (2024)
- Postgraduates: 33 (2024)
- Doctoral students: 32 (2024)
- Location: KM 2, Jalan Raja Isteri Pengiran Anak Saleha, Bandar Seri Begawan, BA 2111, Brunei Darussalam; 4.8857°N 114.9286°E
- Campus: Metropolitan
- Colours: Green, white, yellow and maroon
- Website: www.kupu-sb.edu.bn

The Kolej Universiti Perguruan Ugama Seri Begawan (KUPU SB or Seri Begawan Religious Teachers University College) is a public teacher-training university college situated in Bandar Seri Begawan, the capital of Brunei, founded in 2007. The institution aims to improve the standing of religious education in Brunei and create educators by integrating research and teaching knowledge based on Islamic principles and the Melayu Islam Beraja (MIB) concept.

== Etymology ==
The university is named in honour of Sultan Omar Ali Saifuddien III. Brunei had significant transformations during the 17-year reign of the late Sultan. He was also responsible for developing the MIB philosophy, which functions as the country's governing ideology. In order to prepare his people for the restoration of the state's sovereign powers, which had been started by his predecessor and ignited by the Brunei nationalist movement around the conclusion of World War II. He also launched social and economic reform. After his abdication on 4 October 1967, he assumed the title of Duli Yang Teramat Mulia Paduka Seri Begawan Sultan.

== History ==
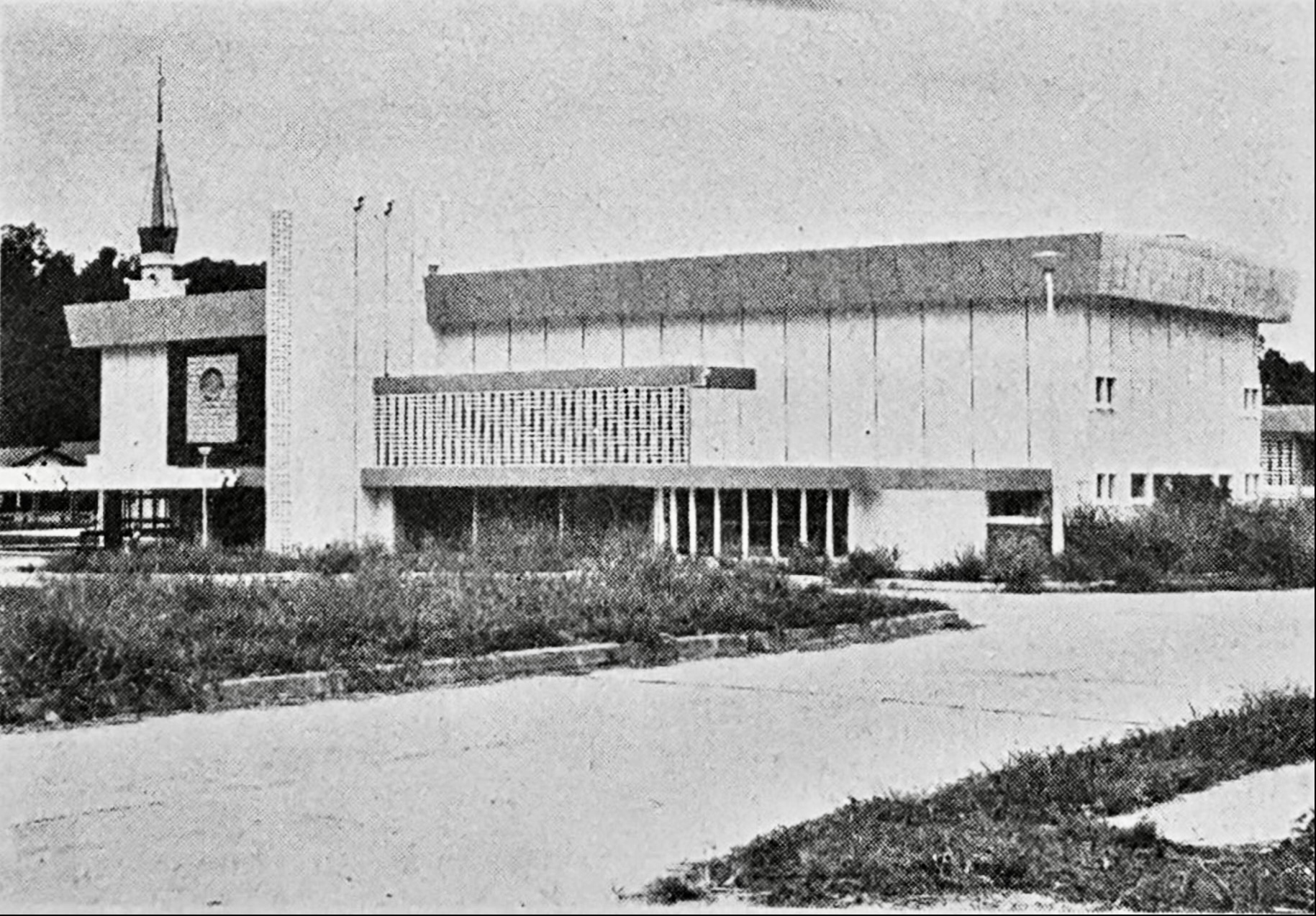
Religious Teachers College

In the Bruneian educational history, the Religious Teachers College at Batu Satu, Jalan Tutong, represents a significant advancement. Construction of the college was approved by Sultan Omar Ali Saifuddien III in 1964. A Religious Education Planning Committee was founded in 1968 with the intention of proposing the establishment of the Religious Teachers' College. Later on 8 July, the Religious Teachers College (Maktab Perguruan Ugama) was established by Sultan Hassanal Bolkiah. The Sultan underlined the need of higher education institutions, especially for teacher preparation, in addition to elementary and secondary schools. The building was finished in 1970, and the Department of Religious Affairs received it at the beginning of 1971. In June 1971, the college's principal was Othman Bidin.

A Teachers' College Council was to be established to supervise policy and advancement, and by the end of 1970, a Special Committee had been established to prepare for the college's founding and develop its governing regulations. The renaming to Seri Begawan Religious Teachers College (MPUSB or Maktab Perguruan Ugama Seri Begawan), and new regulations were authorised by the Sultan. Early in 1971, thirty probationary religious teachers who had completed the Malaysian Lower Certificate were chosen to start a three-year program at MPUSB. The government also authorised a pay scale for teachers who have received training. The religious and Quran lessons in the college's adult education program are separated into levels of primary, secondary, and higher education, according to a set curriculum. The development of the college later underwent two more phases. The second phase began on 5 July 1975, with the formal inauguration of MPUSB.

During the 1428 Hijrah commemoration on 19 January 2007, Sultan Hassanal Bolkiah declared that the educational institution had been granted university status and was now known as Seri Begawan Religious Teachers University College (KUPU SB), with the declaration coming into effect on the following day. Graduate and undergraduate degree holders were expected to be produced by the university college, with classes starting in August 2007.

== Organisation and administration ==
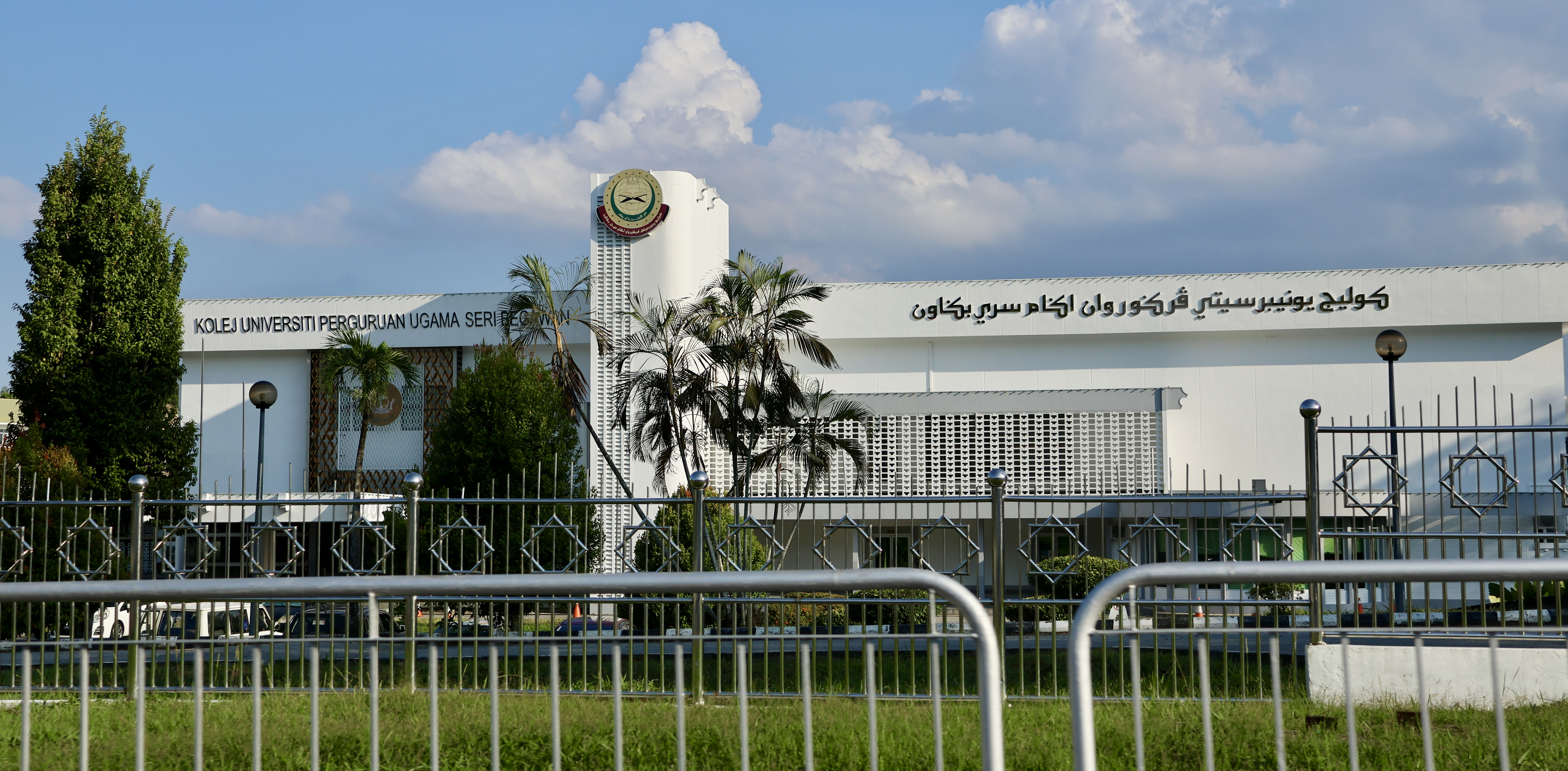
KUPU SB building in 2024

=== Governance ===
The following are the higher administration positions at KUPU SB:

- Ra'es
- Acting Deputy Ra'es
- Registrar

=== Faculties and programmes ===
The Faculty of Education, originally established as the Education Department, was upgraded to a full faculty in 2008. As one of the three faculties at KUPU SB, it offers a range of educational programs and short courses related to teaching. The faculty is dedicated to providing educational courses tailored to teaching and learning needs. It offers five study programs: the Doctor of Philosophy Degree in Religious Education (Islamic Education), the master's degree in Religious Education (Islamic Education), the Post Graduate Religious Teaching Diploma (Islamic Education), the bachelor's degree in Religious Education (Islamic Education) with a Minor, and the Higher Diploma in Religious Education (Islamic Education).

Established in August 2007, the Faculty of Sharia offer various disciplines related to Islamic Sharia since it began its first study program. Its primary objectives are to provide education in Islamic Sharia to both male and female students, enhance their understanding and appreciation of Sharia through exceptional teaching and learning, and consolidate their expertise in the field. The faculty offers a range of programs, including the Doctor of Philosophy Degree in Religious Education (Sharia), Master's Degree in Religion (Sharia), Diploma in Fiqh Studies, and Diploma in Jurisprudence & Usul Fiqh.

Established in August 2007, the Faculty of Usuluddin offer various disciplines related to Usuluddin. Its primary objectives include providing academic and teacher training programs to meet the needs of religion, the nation, and the country; developing pious, authoritative, proactive, and human resources; and producing valuable research and publications for the global community. The faculty is responsible for preparing, offering, and evaluating Usuluddin-related programs, with instruction primarily in Malay, except for the Doctor of Philosophy and Master's degrees, which use Arabic. The four programs offered are the Doctor of Philosophy Degree in Religious Education (Usuluddin), Master's Degree in Religious Education (Usuluddin), Diploma in Monotheistic Studies, and Diploma in Tafsir and Hadith Studies.

The Faculty of Social Science Education was established following the approval of the Sultan during the 11th convocation ceremony on 17 February 2022. This faculty offers advanced programs including a Doctor of Philosophy in Religious Education and a Master's in Religious Education with specialisations in Islamic History and Civilization as well as Literature. Additionally, it provides a Diploma in Religious Teacher Leadership Professional Certificate in collaboration with the Aminuddin Baki Institute of Malaysia. The faculty also features a range of undergraduate programs through its Twinning Program with international universities, including Bachelor's Degrees in Religious Education with specialisations in Physical and Health Education, Techno-Entrepreneurship, Digital Entrepreneurship, Sports Science and Coaching, and Halal Entrepreneurship. Furthermore, it offers short-term in-service courses aimed at enhancing knowledge and skills in Brunei.

== Academic profile ==
=== International partnerships ===
KUPU SB has international membership Asia-Pacific University-Community Engagement Network (APUCEN) and Consortium of Asia Pacific Education Universities (CAPEU). Partnerships have also been signed with Tazkia Internasional Islamic Boarding School in 2019. The list of partnerships was expanded to include Mindanao State University, Dharmawangsa University, Islamic Religious Institute of Hamzanwadi Nadhatul Wathan, Nusa Putra University, Selangor Islamic University College, Nippon Muslim Corporation, Japan Da'wah Center, and Markfield Institute of Higher Education at the 12th Convocation Ceremony in 2022. On 7 May 2024, an agreement was signed with Nahdlatul Ulama University of West Kalimantan.

== Student life ==
As of 2 March 2024, 32 students are studying doctorate in religious education, 71 in master's, 33 in postgraduate diploma, 321 in bachelor's degree, 295 in higher diploma and six in diploma. Some 103 women and 79 men stay at the hostels. Approximately 779 undergraduates are enrolled at the educational institution with an educational staff of 50.

The task of spreading Islamic eminence throughout the Sultanate via education that will be passed down to future generations and elevate mosques across the Sultanate falls on the students who have been chosen to continue their study at KUPU SB.

The KUPU SB Help Desk, an online resource created to help students and the university community with problems pertaining to services, facilities, and instruction, would open for business on 1 August 2024. By resolving complaints, the Help Desk seeks to enhance overall planning at KUPU SB and collect feedback.

== Notable people ==
=== Principals ===
- 1972–1976: Dato Othman Bidin
- 1976–1978: Dato Malai Ahmad Murad
- 1978–1980: Dato Amin Abdul Rahim
- 1980–1982: Dato Abdul Mokti Daud
- 1982–1983: Yahya Ahmad
- 1983–1984: Dato Jali Abdul Latif
- 1984–1986: Tengah Abdul Latif
- 1986–1987: Datin Norzainah Tahir
- 1987–1988: Dato Ishaaq Abdullah
- 1988–1989: Noor Mohadi
- 1989–1995: Datin Maznah Muhammad
- 1995–1998: Kasmah Siput
- 1998–2007: Abdul Rahim Gantang

=== Notable staff ===
- Asri Aspar, facility manager at KUPU SB
- Pengiran Bahrom, teacher at KUPU SB

== Controversies ==
=== Corruption and mismanagement ===
On 2 March 2024, Sultan Hassanal Bolkiah addressed various crucial concerns during an unplanned visit to KUPU SB. In his titah (speech), he noted persistent challenges with financial management and governance that had surfaced since his previous visit in 2020. He voiced worries about weak auditing processes, which impair quality, trust, and openness. He questioned the persistent employment of specific contractors for university maintenance and restoration, despite greater expenses compared to rivals. He criticised the honesty of university executives and workers managing financial concerns and tendering processes, underlining the necessity for respect to laws.

Additionally, the Sultan criticised the practice of selling services or items such as sedekah (donation) or waqaf (endowment), perceiving it as potentially corrupt. He also noted difficulties related scholarships, highlighting disorganisation and inappropriate conversations on scholarship approvals, which have led to overdue tuition costs reaching half a million dollars. The Sultan highlighted that scholarship awards must undergo thorough scrutiny by law enforcement agencies for national security considerations.
