= Sultan Alam Shah Islamic College =

College in Klang, Selangor, Malaysia

Kolej Islam Sultan Alam Shah
- KISAS

Location
- Peti Surat 64, Jalan Kota Raja, 41906; Klang, Selangor; Malaysia

Information
- Type: Premier boarding secondary school owned by the Government
- Motto: Bersama Merangkul Keunggulan (Together Embracing Excellence)
- Religious affiliation: Islam
- Established: 4 April 1955
- School district: Klang
- Principal: Abd Ghani Bin Abidin
- Grades: Form 4 to Upper Form 6
- Enrollment: Approx. 700
- Language: Malay, English and Arabic
- Colors: Green & Yellow
- Yearbook: RESTU
- Affiliations: SBP, SBT
- School Code: BRA 0001
- Special student bodies: Board of Student Leaders (LKM); Peer Counsellors (PRS); Dakwah and Spirituality Body (BADAR); Student Librarians' Body (PerKISAS); Pre-University Representative Council (MPPU); KISAS RESTU Media Team (KMT); PERKISAS TV Media Team (TVPSS); Food and Beverages Committee (KOMETRA/I); Council of Class Leaders (MKT); Cooperative Board
- Alumni: ALKIS
- Website: https://sites.google.com/view/perkisasdigital/laman-utama

Kolej Islam Sultan Alam Shah (English: Sultan Alam Shah Islamic College; abbreviated KISAS; formerly known as Kolej Islam Klang) is an Islamic boarding school in Klang, Selangor. Initially named as Kolej Islam Malaya, it is the first institution for Islamic higher education in Malaya

It was bestowed the title Sekolah Berprestasi Tinggi (High Performing School) in 2010 by the Ministry Of Education. Among others, the school is noted for its Silat and Nasheed teams. The school has also played host for bench marking visits on areas such as Arabic Language, Public Speaking and Silat. In the 2013 Sijil Pelajaran Malaysia (SPM), the school obtained GPS of 1.27.

== History ==
Islamic College of Malaya (Malay: Kolej Islam Malaya, KIM) was founded in 1955 (1374 AH). The institution were built by the efforts of Malaya Muslim scholars as early as the 1920s and with support from the Malay Sultan. KIM was built on a plot of land measuring approximately 14.3 acres located at Jalan Kota Raja, about half a mile from Klang.

The college originated as a palace known as Istana Jamaiah, later donated by Sultan Hisamuddin Alam Shah Al-Haj, hoping that it would give birth to scholars who follow Allah's guidance, illuminating society with the spirit of Islam and to eliminate every form of injustice and ignorance. Back then, KIM function as the main gate for Malay students to pursue studies to Al Azhar University. It also serve as an avenue for Singaporean Malay and Bruneian Malays that unable to continue their studies at the Middle East. The education consist of two years preparatory curricula and five years of higher studies. The first batch of students (consist of fifty students) were under directorship of Haji Ismail Omar, a religious teacher from Johor assisted by two Egyptian Al Azhar scholars. Graduate will received diploma, allowing them to become religious teacher.

In 1957, the school entered into formal agreement with University of Malaya which enabled qualified students to matriculate for Arts programme at the university. In 1961, Mahmud Saltut, rector for Al Azhar University, was invited to Kolej Islam and he agreed that the higher certificate by KIM is similar with Al Azhar bachelor degree and allow those with the certificate to enroll into Al Azhar master program. In 1963, ten graduate students from KIM pursue their master at Al Azhar University.

In 1966 (1386 AH), the college moved to a new building in Petaling Jaya (the current International Islamic University Malaysia Centre for Foundation Studies) and Bangi (the current National University of Malaysia Faculty of Islamic Studies), yet still continued its preparation courses in Klang.

In 1967, the college, taken by the Ministry of Education was converted into a government-aided school known as Klang Islamic College (Malay: Kolej Islam Klang, KIK) and become a feeder for Kolej Islam Malaya. Finally, in 1972, it was turned into a fully residential school with great facilities until today. The school were noted for influencing the standardization of religious school curriculum in Malaysia.

In 1989, KIK was renamed Sultan Alam Shah Islamic College (Malay: Kolej Islam Sultan Alam Shah, KISAS) by Sultan Salahuddin Abdul Aziz Shah al-Haj. Until now, the former Sultan's palace is still standing.

KISAS was recognised as a Cluster School in 2007 and as a High-Performing School in 2010.

== Notable alumni ==
- Noor Hisham Abdullah - Director General, Ministry of Health - One of the most prominent leaders in the fight against the COVID-19 pandemic in Malaysia.
- Anas Alam Faizli - Chief Executive Officer, ProtectHealth - One of the most prominent leaders in the COVID-19 vaccination program in Malaysia
- Haron Din - Malaysian Islamic Party former spiritual adviser.
- Shamsul Iskandar Md. Akin - Former Deputy Minister of Plantation and Commodities (Malaysia)
- Faisal Tehrani - Award-winning novelist.
- Lo' Lo' Mohd Ghazali - Former member of Parliament of Malaysia for the Titiwangsa constituency in Kuala Lumpur.
- Mohd Na'im Mokhtar - former Minister in Prime Minister's Department (Malaysia) for Islam.
- Mohd Hayati Othman - Member of Parliament for Pendang constituency.
- Harussani Zakaria - Former Mufti of Perak.
- Mohd Asri Zainul Abidin - Current mufti of Perlis.
- Juanda Jaya - Islamic preacher and educationist, Member of Sarawak State Assembly for Jemoreng
- Takiyuddin Hassan - Member of Parliament of Kota Bharu, former Minister in Prime Minister's Department (Malaysia) for Law and Parliamentary Affairs, Secretary-General of the Pan-Malaysian Islamic Party
- Yusoff Ismail - Bruneian politician and diplomat
- Yahya Ibrahim - Bruneian first Deputy Minister of Religious Affair, Chief Syar’ie Judge, aristocrat and poet
- Badaruddin Othman- Bruneian 3rd Minister of Religious Affairs, writer
- Tun Faisal Ismail Aziz - politician

== See also ==
- Kolej Islam Malaya - Predecessor of Sultan Alam Shah Islamic College
- List of schools in Selangor
