= Yusoff Ismail =

Bruneian politician and diplomat (born 1952)

Dato Seri Setia Yusoff Ismail DSSUB PJK PKL
- يوسف اسماعيل

Ambassador of Brunei to Saudi Arabia
- In office 23 March 2016 – 17 February 2024
- Preceded by: Abdul Mokti Daud
- Succeeded by: Harun Junid

4th Deputy Minister of Education
- In office 29 May 2010 – 22 October 2015
- Monarch: Hassanal Bolkiah
- Minister: Abu Bakar Apong
- Preceded by: Pengiran Mohammad
- Succeeded by: Pengiran Bahrom

Personal details
- Born: 2 July 1952 (age 74) Kampong Sumbiling, Brunei Town, Brunei
- Education: Sultan Omar Ali Saifuddien College; Madrasah Aljunied Al-Islamiah; Klang Islamic College; Al-Azhar University; National University of Malaysia
- Profession: Politician; civil servant; diplomat

Yusoff bin Haji Ismail (born 2 July 1952) is a Bruneian politician and diplomat who was the Deputy Minister of Education from 2010 to 2015, and the Ambassador of Brunei to Saudi Arabia from 2016 to 2024.

== Early life and education ==
Yusoff bin Haji Ismail, born on 2 July 1952, is originally from Kampong Sumbiling, Brunei Town.

Yusoff began his education at Ahmad Tajuddin Malay School in Kuala Belait in 1959, followed by Sultan Omar Ali Saifuddien College in Brunei Town from 1963 to 1965. He then attended Madrasah Aljunied Al-Islamiah in Singapore from 1965 to 1969 and continued his studies at Klang Islamic College in Malaysia from 1970 to 1973. He later earned a Bachelor of Sharia Wal Qanun from Al-Azhar University in 1979 and completed a Diploma of Education from the National University of Malaysia in 1983.

== Career ==
=== Early career ===
Yusoff began his government career as a Religious Education Officer in 1979 and was later appointed as the Head Religious Teacher at the Sixth Form Centre in 1980. In 1985, he became the Principal of the Raja Isteri Pengiran Anak Damit Girls' Arabic Religious School and subsequently served as the Principal of the Hassanal Bolkiah Boys' Arabic School from 1986 to 1990. Following this, he was appointed as the Principal of Ma'had Islam Brunei from 1990 to 1992.

Yusoff was appointed as the Head of the Secretariat for the Southeast Asia and Pacific Islamic Youth Conference held in Brunei in conjunction with the 1st Brunei Independence Day Celebration in 1984. He attended several regional and international conferences, such as MABIMS, OIC, ISESCO, and IIFSO, and in 2001, he presented a paper in Malaysia entitled "Implementation of Zakat Collection and Distribution – Brunei Darussalam's Experience."

In 1993, he was loaned to serve at Islamic Bank of Brunei (IBB) until 1995, after which he returned to the Ministry of Religious Affairs (MoRA) as the assistant director of Mosque Affairs. He then advanced to the position of Senior Special Duties Officer at the Ministry in 1997. His career progressed further when he was appointed Deputy Permanent Secretary at the MoRA on 10 July 2003, and later became the Permanent Secretary in 2004. In 2005, he was appointed as the Permanent Secretary at the Ministry of Internal Affairs, where he served until 2007. During this time, he also held significant roles such as Member of the Public Service Commission from 2007 to 2010, chairman of the Board of Directors of Darussalam Holdings from 2003 to 2010, and deputy chairman of the Board of Directors of Brunei Islamic Trust Fund from 2007 to 2010.

=== Ministerial career ===
In the 2010 Bruneian cabinet reshuffle on 29 May, Yusoff was appointed deputy minister of education, replacing him as permanent secretary at the Ministry of Home Affairs.

On 9 April 2014, the first Joint-Working Group Meeting between Brunei and Vietnam was co-chaired by Yusoff, who spoke about possible partnerships in fields including English language, mathematics, and technical and vocational education and training (TVET) as well as enhancing educational linkages. Additionally, he discussed the advancements in education that Brunei has made, such as the conversion of TVET into the Institute of Brunei Technical Education (IBTE) and other programs sponsored by the National Education System for the 21st Century (SPN21).

Yusoff underlined on 26 March 2015, the significance of Islamic Tasawwur in moulding human nature and conduct via a revelation-based educational approach. He stressed that in order to guard against ignorance and erroneous interpretations of religious teachings, successful education incorporates spirituality and knowledge. In order to attend the first Joint-Working Group Meeting between the education ministries of Vietnam and Brunei, Yusoff flew to Hanoi. The conference, which took place from 2 to 3 April, was an extension of a collaboration established in 2014 through a Memorandum of Understanding. It focused on many educational projects and included visits to neighboring educational institutions.

On 19 May 2015, Yusoff reiterated that the government's dedication to appreciating contributions from both the public and private education sectors is demonstrated by the Excellent Student Award Committee's acknowledgment of private schools. He pointed out that the achievement of a Tionghua student from Maktab Ilmu Paduka Seri Begawan Sultan in Islamic Religious Knowledge (PUI) shows how studying Islam may help non-Muslim students comprehend the faith better. From 14 to 15 October 2015, he attended the OECD Higher Education Conference in Singapore, where the main topics of discussion were how to align educational systems with industry demands and adjust to changing social, economic, and technological circumstances.

Following a cabinet reshuffle on 22 October 2015, his tenure as minister came to an end.

=== Diplomatic career ===
Yusoff was given the letter of credence by Sultan Hassanal Bolkiah on 23 March 2016, designating him as Brunei Darussalam's Ambassador to Saudi Arabia. Three foreign envoys to Brunei also presented their inaugural letters to the Sultan at the occasion at Istana Nurul Iman. After his recent appointment, Crown Prince Al-Muhtadee Billah welcomed him on 29 March.

On 15 March 2017, Ambassador Yusoff gave a presentation of his credentials to the OIC, reiterating Brunei's commitment to the organization and indicating his intention to work closely with the OIC General Secretariat, Yousef Al-Othaimeen. The official appointment of him as Ambassador of Brunei Darussalam to the Kingdom of Saudi Arabia took place on 23 March 2017, when he received his letter of credence from Sultan Hassanal Bolkiah. Later on 23 April, he noted that the recent visit by King Salman to Brunei signalled the beginning of a new chapter in the two countries' bilateral ties.

Ambassador Yusoff took part in a virtual Haj Management meeting on 27 December 2022, with the Saudi Arabian Ministry of Hajj and Umrah. The topics of discussion included Brunei's pilgrim quota, accommodations, transportation, and safety protocols for the approaching hajj season. On 20 October 2023, he was present to witness the Sultan Hassanal Bolkiah's departure for the ASEAN–Gulf Cooperation Council Summit in Riyadh.

He said final farewell to Minister Adel al-Jubeir on 25 January 2024, in Riyadh, following Al-Jubeir's resignation from the position. On 17 February 2024, the Sultan presented letter of credence to the newly appointed Brunei Darussalam envoys, including Harun Junid, who succeeded Yusoff as Ambassador to Saudi Arabia.

== Personal life ==
Yusoff is married to Datin Hajah Samsiah binti Haji Abdul Rahman.

== Honours ==
Yusoff has earned the following honours;

- Order of Islam Brunei Second Class (DSSUB) – Dato Seri Setia
- Order of Islam Brunei Third Class (SSUB)
- Order of Islam Brunei Fourth Class (SUB)
- Meritorious Service Medal (PJK)
- Long Service Medal (PKL)
- Proclamation of Independence Medal (1997)
- National Day Silver Jubilee Medal (23 February 2009)

Political offices
| Preceded by Pengiran Mohammad | 4th Deputy Minister of Education; 29 May 2010 – 22 October 2015 | Succeeded by Pengiran Bahrom |
Diplomatic posts
| Preceded by Abdul Mokti Daud | Ambassador of Brunei to Saudi Arabia; 23 March 2016 – 17 February 2024 | Succeeded by Harun Junid |
