= Badaruddin Othman =

Bruneian poet and politician (born 1942)

Yang Berhormat Pehin Udana Khatib Dato Paduka Seri Setia Badaruddin Othman PSSUB DPMB PHBS PBLI PJK PKL
- بدرالدين عثمان
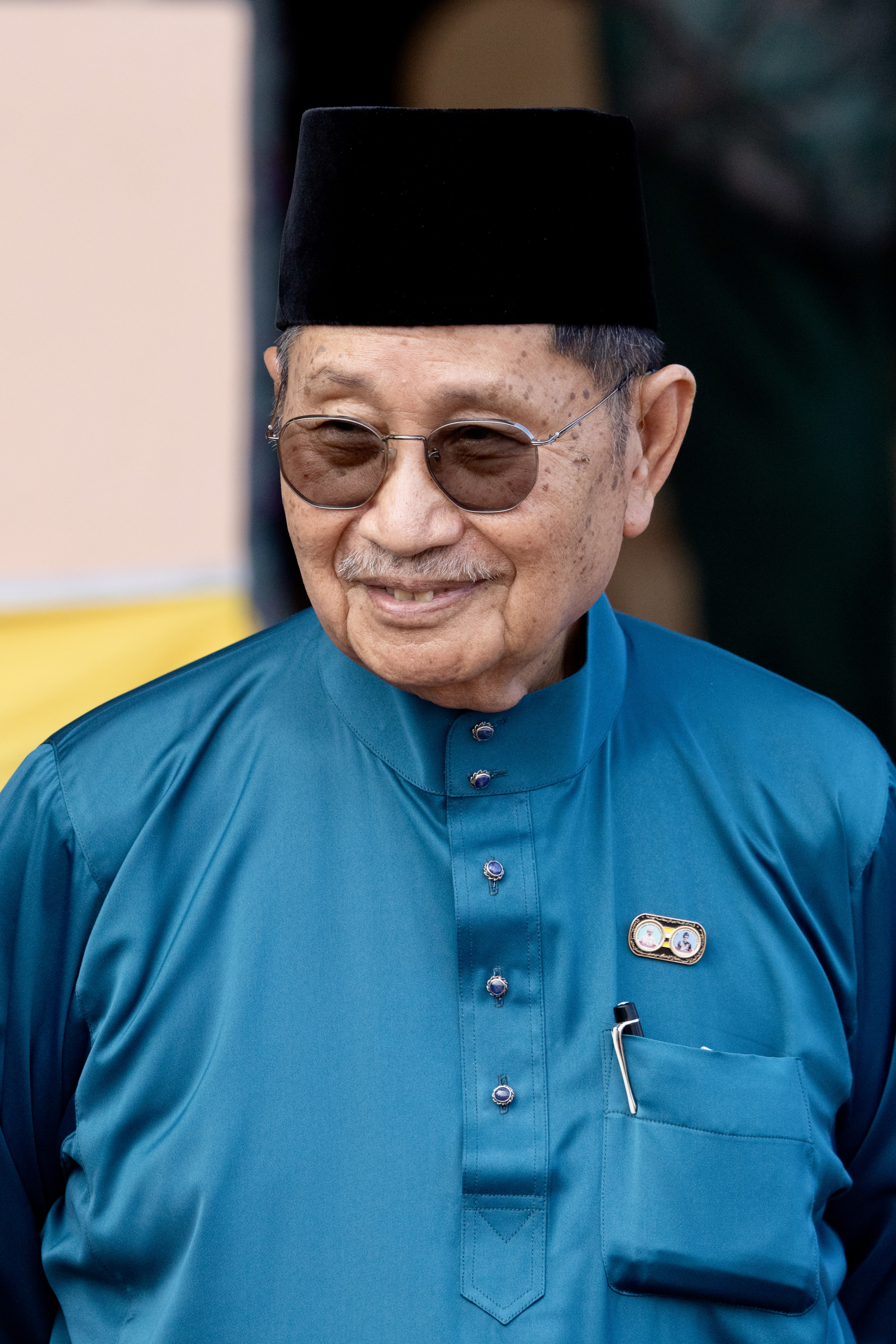
- Badaruddin in 2024

3rd Minister of Religious Affairs
- In office 22 October 2015 – 4 June 2026
- Monarch: Hassanal Bolkiah
- Deputy: Abdul Mokti Daud; Pengiran Bahrom; Pengiran Mohammad Tashim
- Preceded by: Pengiran Mohammad
- Succeeded by: Pengiran Mohammad Tashim

4th Minister of Home Affairs
- In office 29 May 2010 – 22 October 2015
- Deputy: Halbi Mohammad Yussof
- Preceded by: Adanan Yusof
- Succeeded by: Abu Bakar Apong

2nd Deputy Minister of Religious Affairs
- In office 25 May 2005 – 29 May 2010
- Minister: Zain Serudin
- Preceded by: Yahya Ibrahim
- Succeeded by: Pengiran Bahrom
Diplomatic positions
Ambassador of Brunei to Indonesia
In office August 1986 – March 1987
Succeeded by	Pengiran Abdul Momin

Personal details
- Born: 23 September 1942 (age 83) Kampong Burong Pingai, Kampong Ayer, Brunei
- Education: Madrasah Aljunied Al-Islamiah; Kolej Islam Malaya
- Alma mater: Al-Azhar University
- Occupation: Poet; politician; teacher
- Awards: S.E.A. Write Award; Mastera Literary Award

Badaruddin bin Haji Othman (born 23 September 1942), known by his pen name Badaruddin H.O., is a Bruneian aristocrat, poet, and politician. He has served as the minister of religious affairs since 2015. Previously, he held several prominent roles, including ambassador to Indonesia from 1986 to 1987, deputy minister of religious affairs from 2005 to 2010, and minister of home affairs from 2010 to 2015.

In 1983, Badaruddin embraced the Melayu Islam Beraja (MIB) philosophy, which emphasised Islamic values to strengthen support for Brunei's monarchy. During the 1990s, he became a key proponent of MIB as the leader of Brunei's conservative Islamic political movement. His advocacy extended to encouraging non-Muslims to convert to Islam to integrate into Bruneian society, while also seeking to counter materialistic and consumer-driven cultural trends.

== Early life and education ==
Badaruddin bin Pengarah Dato Paduka Haji Othman was born on 23 September 1942 in Kampong Burong Pingai, a part of Kampong Ayer. He pursued his education at several notable institutions, including Brunei Town Malay School from 1950 to 1956, Madrasah Aljunied Al-Islamiah in Singapore from 1956 to 1961, and Kolej Islam Malaya in Klang, Selangor, from 1962 to 1967. Between 1968 and 1971, he earned a master's degree in Islamic legal policy from Al-Azhar University in Egypt.

== Political career ==
=== Director of Information ===
Badaruddin's career began in 1968 as a teacher before being appointed by the Brunei government in 1971 as a religious officer at the Arabic Secondary School. He then became the head of broadcasting and information in 1976, head of information officer in 1979, and subsequently promoted to director of Information at the State Secretary's Office in 1980.

On 16 March 1983, Badaruddin praised the monarchy for promoting and defending religion, emphasising the importance of implementing Islamic principles in daily life and applauding Brunei's moderation in religious sentiment. He also highlighted the significance of societal harmony in achieving the government's goals and stressed the authority of the 1959 Constitution, especially its legislative aspects. In June 1983, Badaruddin expressed concerns that the public might not fully align their self-interest with the government's development goals, urging citizens to actively participate in progress and contribute to independence. He encouraged the public to adapt to new challenges, protect Brunei's sovereignty, and not relinquish responsibility to the state. Through Pelita Brunei, he played a key role in shaping the government's narrative, ensuring the publication aligned with the monarchy's views and served as a vital tool during Brunei's transition from British protection.

Badaruddin played a role in preparing the public for Brunei's transition to independence, addressing confusion and concerns through speeches in July and August 1983. He stressed the importance of presenting an open and honest view of Brunei's political system to protect the country’s identity and unity. Badaruddin highlighted the distinct political structure based on the monarchy and the shared experiences of the people, which were vital for maintaining sovereignty and preventing unrest. He also addressed the legitimacy of Brunei's democratic system, emphasising the need for broad support rooted in the people's self-interest. Recognising the challenges posed by foreign values, Badaruddin noted that ASEAN membership could foster regional growth and stability while preserving Brunei's unique system. He stressed the importance of the public's patriotic support for the government and justified the use of Emergency Laws to maintain stability. While acknowledging press censorship, he affirmed that local media should regulate themselves while directing public opinion towards constructive goals.

In 1984, Badaruddin expressed concerns about the Western media misrepresentation of ASEAN states, particularly the use of the term "absolute monarchy" to describe Brunei and other ASEAN members. Speaking at a symposium on ASEAN–EEC ties in Jakarta, he criticised the term for distorting the reality of governance, implying an arbitrary rule against the people's will. In 1985, Badaruddin played a key role in establishing Brunei as a MIB. He clarified that while Brunei had historically been a Malay sultanate, the 1959 Constitution explicitly enshrined Islamic principles and Malay culture, which are central to Bruneian identity. He emphasised that being "Bruneian" is shaped by Islamic and Malay traditions, and as such, Brunei should not be regarded as a multiracial or multi-religious society. Furthermore, he highlighted that non-Malay Muslims in Brunei were expected to adhere to the Malay language and customs as integral aspects of nationhood. Badaruddin's tenure as director of information ended in November 1985.

=== Deputy Minister of Religious Affairs ===
Before embarking on his ministerial career, Badaruddin was appointed director of the Islamic Da'wah Centre in 1985. He went on to serve as ambassador to Indonesia and non-resident high commissioner to Papua New Guinea from August 1986 to March 1987. From 1 January 1989 to 1999, he held the position of permanent secretary at the Prime Minister's Office. During this time, there were differing views within official circles on the application of the MIB concept, with Badaruddin advocating for a moderate approach to Islam in Brunei, emphasising its role as a unifying force for the nation. He also served as acting chairman of the Public Service Commission from 19 May 2001 to 23 May 2005.

On 24 May 2005, Badaruddin was appointed deputy minister of religious affairs by the sultan as part of a cabinet reshuffle. To transform Brunei into a nation aligned with Allah's will, the sultan conceived the idea of Negara Zikir on 19 December 2007, with Badaruddin playing a key role in its development. In 2008, Badaruddin described Negara Zikir as a country where the people recognise Allah's blessings and maintain a constant awareness of him. He also noted that religious programming on television and radio had reached a level of daily prominence, highlighted by the establishment of the TV Dakwah Unit and the Nur Islam radio channel. Despite variations in content, the radio networks consistently featured religious programming.

=== Minister of Home Affairs ===
As part of a cabinet reshuffle, Badaruddin was appointed minister of religious affairs on 29 May 2010. He took the oath of office later that year on 9 June at Istana Nurul Iman, with his appointment set for a five-year term according to Brunei's constitution.

On 28 March 2011, Badaruddin led a selection committee that reviewed the results of the nomination and voting process for Brunei's Legislative Council (LegCo). The procedure, which took less than 30 minutes, was efficient and resulted in the transmission of the results to the sultan's officials for the declaration of the winners. Among the newly selected council members were the sultan, ministers, titled individuals, and district representatives. Despite the election, the 2011 Freedom House "Freedom in the World" report noted that Brunei's civil liberties and political rights were ranked low.

Badaruddin spoke at the Regata Brunei Darussalam on 21 January 2012, highlighting its aim to revive Bruneians' sentimental ties to Kampong Ayer and the Brunei River. On 25 February 2012, Badaruddin highlighted the importance of both new and experienced municipal board members in enhancing local government effectiveness. He encouraged the sharing of ideas and suggested focusing on maintaining a clean environment, improving business property fee collection, and managing arrears more effectively. He also acknowledged efforts to facilitate business permits and welcomed suggestions to streamline the business licensing process.

On 19 December 2014, Badaruddin emphasised the need to evaluate the success of the "Bahasa Jiwa Bangsa" initiative, which had been launched five years earlier by Dewan Bahasa dan Pustaka (DBP). With over 50 years of experience, he expressed confidence that DBP was prepared to implement necessary changes, including adopting new strategies for its language campaigns. Speaking at the 2014 Literary Essay and Short Story Writing Award Ceremony, he stressed DBP’s role in standardising and promoting Malay as the official language of Brunei since its establishment. He also highlighted the importance of assessing DBP's initial goals, particularly in the fields of language and literature.

In February 2015, under Badaruddin's leadership, the Ministry of Home Affairs announced that the Brunei government had imposed stringent restrictions on Chinese New Year performances as part of a gradual effort to limit non-Muslim cultural and religious activities in the country. Lion dances would only be allowed for a brief period over three days (19–21 February) and at three designated locations: temples, Chinese homes, and school hallways. Holding performances in public spaces or commercial establishments was strictly prohibited.

=== Minister of Religious Affairs ===
On 22 October 2015, Badaruddin was appointed minister of religious affairs as part of a broader cabinet reshuffle, during which several senior officials were reassigned to new positions. He succeeded Pengiran Mohammad Abdul Rahman in the role. During his tenure, Badaruddin was most notably recognised for overseeing the complex implementation of Brunei's Syariah Penal Code Order (SPCO) 2013. (Note: According to Badaruddin, the nation sought to impose Islamic rule as early as 1974, which was ten years prior to gaining independence from Britain. But at the time, he said, the nation lacked the necessary number of qualified individuals to move on with it. Instead, they gathered the required information and sought advice from experts, and in 2007 they were able to produce a draft of the Syariah penal code.)

During a royal speech in May 2014, the sultan underlined that the Ministry of Religious Affairs (MoRA), led by Badaruddin, was one of the authorities responsible for putting the SPCO law into effect. With its gradual implementation of Shariah laws for both Muslims and non-Muslims, this law represented a dramatic change. Citing organisational difficulties, Badaruddin issued a public apology in January 2016 for the delays in completing the Syariah Courts CPC. During a surprise visit to MoRA in February 2016, the sultan had publicly criticised MoRA, demanding explanations from the authorities, including the Attorney General's Chambers, for the 2-year delays in completing the CPC, which was a crucial stage in the SPCO's second phase. The sultan bemoaned the ministry's emphasis on outside activities rather than office work and voiced his displeasure with bureaucratic inaction. In response, Badaruddin said that the second phase would begin in June 2016 after the finalised CPC was delivered. He explained that final changes were being made to ensure the SPCO's enforcement was fair and in line with Islamic law. He also mentioned ongoing training programs and staff exchanges with foreign institutions experienced in Islamic criminal law. Even so, there were still delays in the process as MoRA dealt with implementation and training issues.

Badaruddin retained his position in the 2018 Bruneian cabinet reshuffle, which replaced six ministers. He later criticised remarks made by non-LegCo parties who argued that the increased budget allocation for his ministry was wasteful and impeded the nation's development strategy. During his motion of adjournment on the final day of the 15th LegCo session on 22 March 2019, he described these views as unwise and unaligned with local ideology, attributing them to a lack of understanding of the national education policy and objectives.

On 20 November 2021, Badaruddin urged the public to get vaccinated against COVID-19, addressing concerns about the relatively low number of MoRA employees and members of the public who were hesitant to receive the vaccine.

In response to the 2023 Turkey–Syria earthquake, he participated as a special advisor in the national committee for Turkiye and Syria Earthquake Humanitarian Fund. Alongside Nazmi Mohamad, he attended a committee meeting on 14 February at Digadong Hall after the sultan granted permission for the establishment of the fund.

On 1 March 2022, during the fifth day of the 18th LegCo Meeting, Badaruddin warned that social media posts containing disparaging or slanderous remarks against the MoRA could undermine Islamic principles and noted that individuals making such statements might face legal consequences. He retained his position as minister of religious affairs during the 2022 cabinet reshuffle on 7 June.

== Literary career ==
Writing under the pen name Badaruddin H.O., Badaruddin's poetry is notable for its Islamic themes and frequent references to God. Works such as "Though Your Home in the Hereafter" (Meski Rumah Mu Di Akhirat), Istighfar Rejab, "This Is Not My Baby" (Ini Zat Bukan Bayangku), "Tsunami's Episodes" (Episod-Episod Tsunami), "It’s Fate" (Takdir Itu Begini), "In the Holy Night of Ramadan" (Di Malam Kudus Ramadan), and "White Stick" (Tongkat Putih) exemplify his artistry. His poetry is often analysed using a da'wah theoretical framework, highlighting elements of divine majesty and employing a gentle linguistic style to convey religious messages effectively.

Badaruddin is also locally recognised for his patriotic poetry, particularly "Di Bawah Sedar." Inspired by his experiences during the 1960s while studying in Singapore and Kuala Lumpur, his work reflects themes of nationalism and incorporates the MIB ideology. In this poem, he critically and satirically examines colonial exploitation, challenging the claims of colonial powers who justified their ownership of seized territories as legitimate rather than acts of conquest. His poetry consistently engages with themes of cultural preservation and national identity, demonstrating a deep commitment to Brunei's values and sovereignty.

== Personal life ==
Badaruddin is married and has six children, including Nabil Daraina. (Note: Nabil Daraina and his wife, Ramzidah Abdul Rahman, have been charged with 152 counts of corruption relating to stealing more than B$7 million from Brunei's judicial system. Up until January 2018, they were both senior judges in Brunei's judicial system. Police detained them in relation to the theft of money from the Bankruptcy Office of the High Court. The funds were reportedly used to purchase high-end vehicles and other valuable items worth $3.2 million. Nabil was charged with eight counts of money laundering; he was found guilty on six of them and exonerated on the other two owing to inadequate evidence.) His home is located at Daraina 8, Spg 530, Jalan Kota Batu, Kampong Sungai Besar.

== Titles, styles and honours ==
=== Titles and styles ===
On 6 November 1984, Badaruddin was honoured by Sultan Hassanal Bolkiah with the manteri title of Pehin Udana Khatib, bearing the style Yang Dimuliakan.

=== Awards ===
Badaruddin has been given the following awards:

- ASEAN-COCI (Information) (1993)
- Lee Kuan Yew Fellowship (1995)
- S.E.A Write Award (1998)
- Mastera Literary Award (1999)

=== Honours ===
Badaruddin has been bestowed the following honours:

- Order of Islam Brunei First Class (PSSUB; 1998) – Dato Paduka Seri Setia
- Order of Seri Paduka Mahkota Brunei Second Class (DPMB; 1987) – Dato Paduka
- Sultan Hassanal Bolkiah Medal First Class (PHBS; 15 July 2010)
- Pingat Bakti Laila Ikhlas (PBLI; 2002)
- Meritorious Service Medal (PJK; 1998)
- Long Service Medal (PKL; 1999)
- Sultan of Brunei Silver Jubilee Medal (5 October 1992)
- National Day Silver Jubilee Medal (23 February 2009)
- Proclamation of Independence Medal (1997)
- Police Diamond Jubilee Medal

== Notes ==
Diplomatic posts
Preceded by –	Ambassador of Brunei to Indonesia; August 1986 – March 1987	Succeeded by Pengiran Abdul Momin
Political offices
Preceded by Pengiran Mohammad	3rd Minister of Religious Affairs; 22 October 2015 – present	Succeeded by Incumbent
Preceded by Adanan Yusof	4th Minister of Home Affairs; 29 May 2010 – 22 October 2015	Succeeded by Abu Bakar Apong
Preceded by Yahya Ibrahim	2nd Deputy Minister of Religious Affairs; 25 May 2005 – 29 May 2010	Succeeded by Pengiran Bahrom
