= Madrasah Aljunied Al-Islamiah =

Madrasah Aljunied al-Islamiah
- مدرسة الجنيد الإسلامية

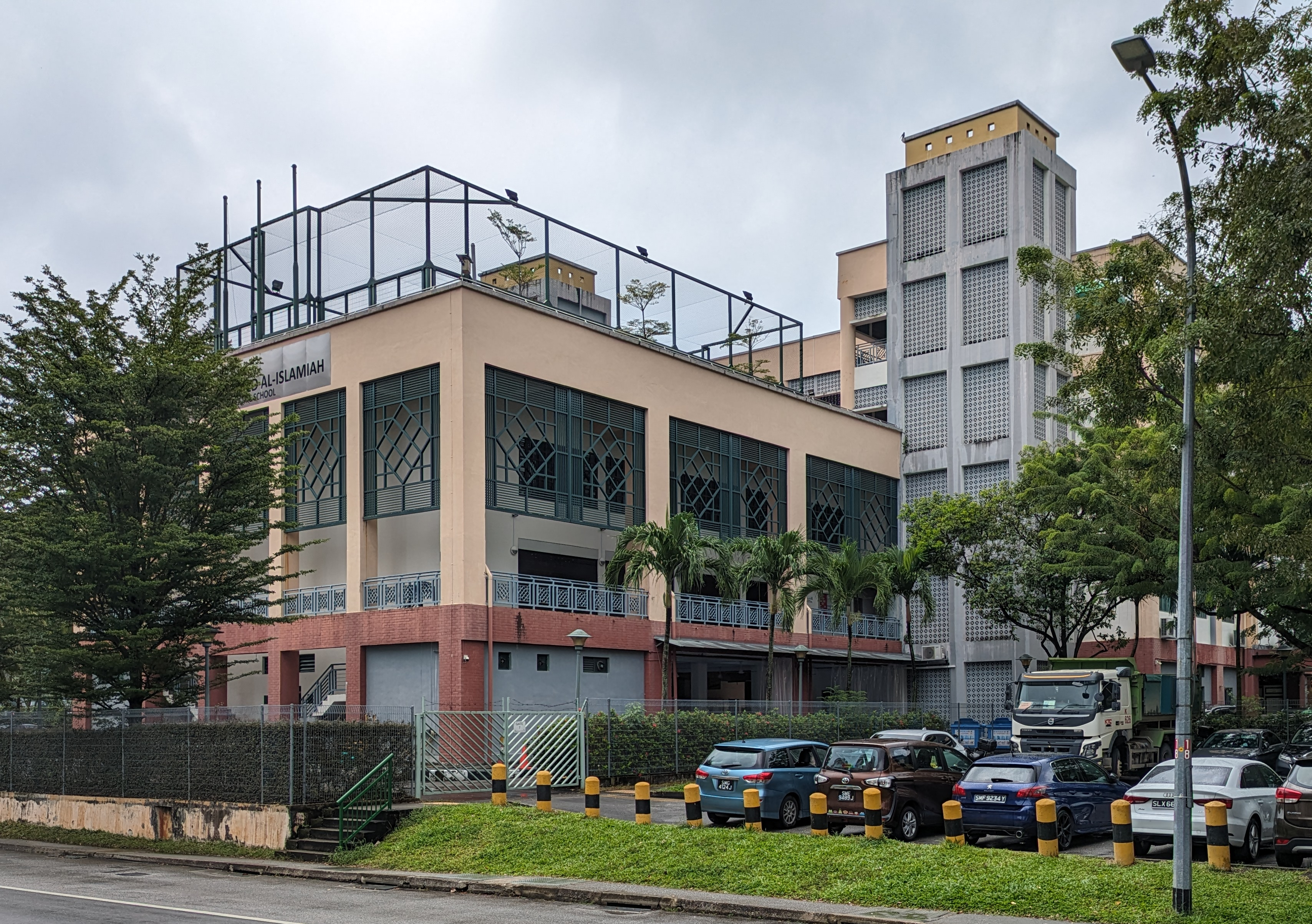

Location
- 30 Victoria Lane; 198424; Singapore; 1.30458°N 103.85771°E

Information
- Type: Independent, madrasah
- Motto: العلم نور (Knowledge is Light)
- Founded: 1927
- Founder: Syed Abdul Rahman Aljunied
- Session: Single session
- Principal: Herman Cher Ma'in
- Gender: Coeducational (gender segregated)
- Area: Bugis
- Colours: Navy blue, white
- Website: www.aljunied.edu.sg

Madrasah Aljunied Al-Islamiah is a full-time, private Islamic institution of learning in Singapore, one of the six madrasahs in Singapore. Madrasah Aljunied is one of the oldest surviving madrasahs in Singapore. Through its years, it has gained eminence for its high standard of Arabic language and Islamic scholarship in the region. Madrasah Aljunied has line of alumni of prominent Islamic religious leaders in Singapore and Southeast Asia.

== Leadership ==
Principal : Mr Herman Cher Ma'in

Vice Principal : Dr. Afif Pasuni

Assistant Vice Principal (Curriculum) : Ustaz Abdul Mukhsien Mohd Shariff

IBDP Coordinator : Mr. Akbar Hussain Abdul Ali

== History ==
Madrasah Aljunied is located next to the historical Jalan Kubor Cemetery.

Madrasah Aljunied is the second oldest Islamic school in Singapore after Madrasah Alsagoff. It was founded in 1927 by a philanthropist, Syed Abdul Rahman Aljunied. The school's original two-storey building stood on a 4.4-hectare (11-acre) plot of land. The new building, however, sits on a mere 0.52 hectare of land.

Madrasah Aljunied's founder, Syed Abdul Rahman Aljunied, observed that Abu Bakar bin Taha was the most eligible candidate for the position of Headmaster. Abu Bakar agreed but on two conditions: that the Arabic language be used as the medium of instruction; and that its educational system and pedagogy must be modern.

Abu Bakar's conditions were well-received, and he ran the Madrasah with tight discipline as Headmaster from 1927 to 1955.

Through the years, Madrasah Aljunied's reputation as a premier Islamic educational institution in South East Asia was solidified. An apocryphal account states that Abu Bakar even allowed a section of his house at Java Road to be used as free accommodation for his students.

== Curriculum ==
The school employs a dual-curriculum system that balances both religious and non-religious subjects. The school's objective means that emphasis is given to Islamic subjects.

For Islamic subjects, the school uses a variant of Al-Azhar curriculum, which also ensures accreditation and direct entry to the University of Al-Azhar.

Secular subjects are largely taught as part of the local curriculum and gain MOE-recognised qualifications. Students are either in the four-year "Express" stream and take the "O" Levels at Secondary 4 or in the five-year "Normal" (Academic) stream and take the "O" Levels as well.

The school is also an IB World School and offers the IB Diploma Program for its students.

== Notable alumni ==
- Nazirudin Mohd Nasir, current Mufti of Singapore
- Fatris Bakaram, former Mufti of Singapore
- Syed Isa Mohamed Semait, former Mufti of Singapore.
- Salim Jasman, former President of the Syariah Court.
- Abu Bakar Hashim, former President of the Syariah Court, and a key actor in negotiations with terrorists during the Laju incident in 1974.
- Syed Ahmad Syed Mohamed and Pasuni Maulan, Registrars of Muslim Marriages.
- Ahmad Sonhaji, a prominent religious leader
- Syed Abdillah Aljufri, a prominent religious leader
- Yahya Ibrahim, Brunei's Deputy Minister of Religious Affairs and a recipient of the S.E.A. Write Award in 1987
- Zain Serudin, Brunei's Minister of Religious Affairs and first Bruneian to graduate from the prestigious Al-Azhar University in 1963
- Pengiran Mohammad Abdul Rahman, Brunei's Minister of Religious Affairs
- Pengiran Bahrom, Brunei's Deputy Minister of Education and Religious Affairs
- Mahmud Saedon, Bruneian muslim scholar
- Yusoff Ismail, Brunei's Deputy Minister of Education
- Hassan Azhari, Malaysian Muslim educator and scholar
- Ahmad Abdurrahman, one of the two madrasah students who were offered places in the highly competitive Yong Loo Lin School of Medicine in National University of Singapore for the first time in 2015. The other is Amalina Ridzuan, a graduate of Madrasah Al-Ma'arif Al-Islamiah.
- Irwan Hadi Bin Mohd Shuhaimy, President of Singapore Syariah Court
