= Pengiran Mohammad Tashim =

Bruneian syariah judge and politician (born 1970)

Dato Seri Setia Pengiran Mohammad Tashim PSNB SPMB DSSUB SSUB SUB PKL
- ڤڠيرن محمد تاشيم
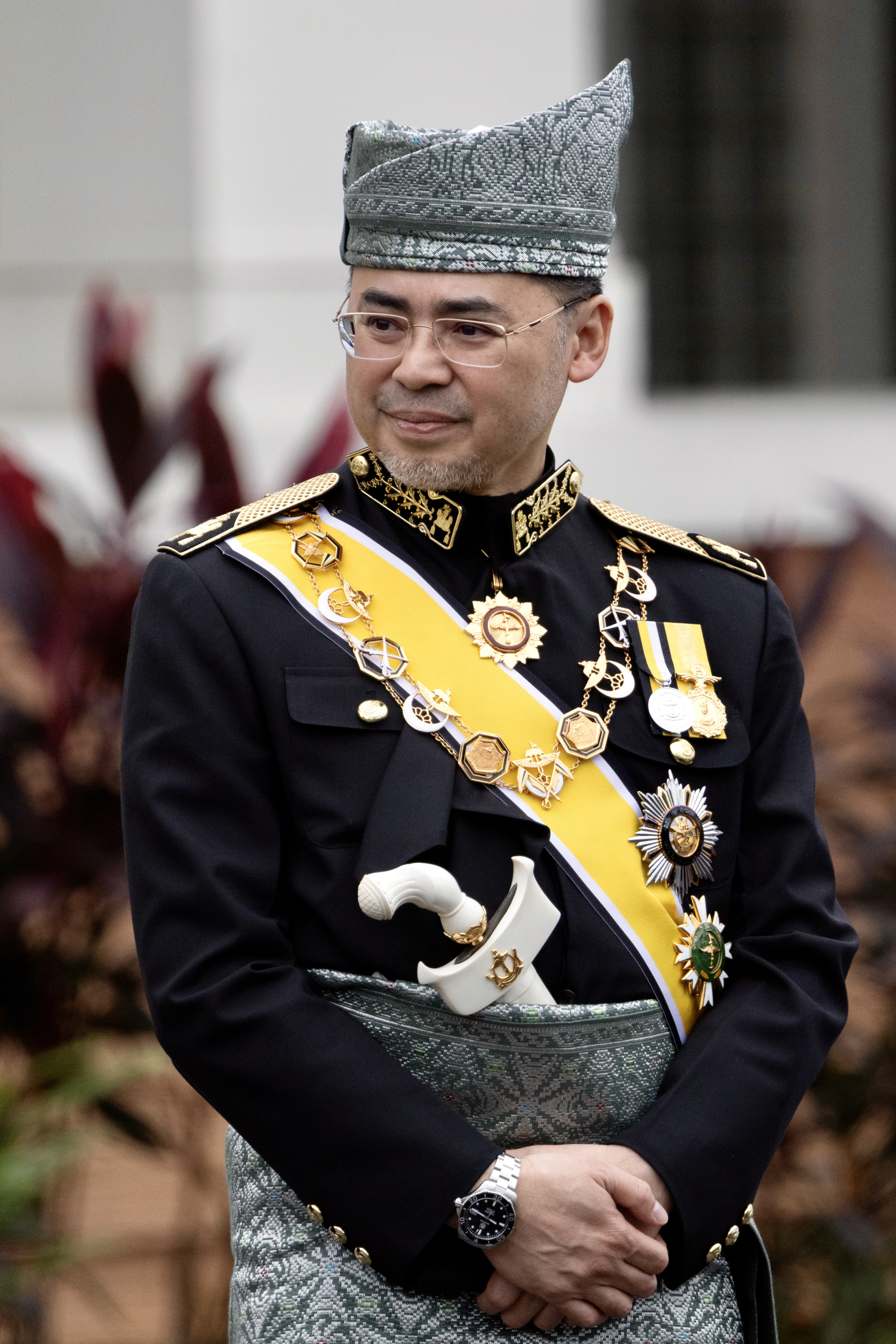
- Pengiran Mohammad Tashim in 2024

4th Minister of Religious Affairs
- Incumbent
- Assumed office 4 June 2026
- Monarch: Hassanal Bolkiah
- Preceded by: Badaruddin Othman

Personal details
- Born: 12 January 1970 (age 56) Kota Batu, Bandar Seri Begawan, Brunei-Muara, Brunei
- Spouse: Norazimah Ramlee
- Education: Al-Azhar University; International Islamic University Malaysia; National University of Malaysia
- Occupation: Syariah judge; politician

Pengiran Mohammad Tashim bin Pengiran Haji Hassan (born 12 January 1970) is a Bruneian politician and former syariah judge who served as the incumbent Minister of Religious Affairs (MoRA) since 4 June 2026. Previously, he was Deputy Minister of Religious Affairs (MoRA) since 2022. He is also a member of the Universiti Brunei Darussalam (UBD) council, Manpower Planning & Employment Council (MPEC), deputy chairman of Seri Begawan Religious Teachers University College and chairman of Badan Tanmiah Brunei.

== Education ==
Pengiran Mohammad Tashim attended Sengkurong Religious School from 1977 to 1979 and Sengkurong Malay School from 1976 to 1979 for his early education before continuing his studies at Hassanal Bolkiah Boys' Arabic Secondary School from 1980 to 1988. He continued his further studies at Al-Azhar University in Egypt's Faculty of Sharia and Law, where he graduated in August 1993 with a Bachelor in Islamic Sharia in November 1989. He continued his education while working for the government of Brunei, first at the International Islamic University Malaysia (IIUM) Faculty of Law, where he graduated with a Diploma in Law & Administration of Islamic Judiciary from August 1995 to July 1996 and then at the National University of Malaysia Faculty of Islamic Studies, where he earned a Master of Islamic Studies (Shariah) from December 2010 to December 2012.

== Career ==
On 1 November 1993, Pengiran Mohammad Tashim started working for the Bruneian government as a Religious Officer. He frequently filled in for Temburong, Brunei-Muara, and Belait districts of Kadi (Qadi). He was appointed Tutong District's District Kadi on 1 April 2000, and on 1 April 2004, he was reappointed as a Syariah Lower Court Judge. On 1 July 2006, he was appointed Deputy Chief Registrar and, on 1 May 2009, Chief Registrar of the Syariah Court of Appeal. He was named a judge of the Syariah High Court on 1 June 2012, and on 2 August 2021, he was appointed a judge of the Syariah Court of Appeal, a position he held until 6 June 2022. Following a cabinet reshuffle on 7 June 2022, he was named Deputy Minister of Religious Affairs.

Pengiran Mohammad Tashim paid visits to Pengiran Isteri Hajjah Mariam Serasa Secondary School, Kapok Primary School, and Serasa Primary School on 2 January 2023. The purpose of this joint visit from the MoRA and Ministry of Education (MoE) was to evaluate how back-to-school programs are being implemented and to evaluate the facilities and infrastructure of the schools, including the classrooms, preschool learning rooms, canteen, prayer hall, and ablution area. The visit came after the Compulsory instruction Act (APW) was amended to decrease the school age from six to five. The tour's main goals were to adopt STEAM fields and integrate religious instruction into general education.

During his work visit to Ma'had Islam Brunei on 4 January 2023, Pengiran Mohammad Tashim observed a mini-exhibition showcasing student innovations and performances by two groups of students who won the 22nd Asia Pacific ICT Alliance (APICTA) Awards 2023 in Hong Kong. On 30 September 2023, he emphasized the importance of youth participation in mosque-related events and initiatives, acknowledging the challenges of modern life and asserting that youth engagement is essential to harness their potential and energy, contributing to the revival and development of Rabbi people.

== Personal life ==
Pengiran Mohammad Tashim was born in Kampong Kota Batu on 12 January 1970. After his marriage to Datin Norazimah binti Haji Ramlee, together they had seven children.

== Honours ==
Throughout his career, he has earned the following honours:

- Order of Setia Negara Brunei First Class (PSNB; 15 July 2026) – Dato Seri Setia
- Order of Seri Paduka Mahkota Brunei First Class (SPMB; 15 July 2022) – Dato Seri Paduka
- Order of Islam Brunei Second Class (DSSUB; 15 July 2017) – Dato Seri Setia
- Order of Islam Brunei Third Class (SSUB; 15 July 2011)
- Order of Islam Brunei Fourth Class (SUB; 15 July 2006)
- Long Service Medal (PKL; 30 May 2017)
- Sultan of Brunei Golden Jubilee Medal (5 October 2017)

Political offices
Preceded by Badaruddin Othman	4th Minister of Religious Affairs; 4 June 2026 – present	Succeeded by Incumbent
