= Kolej Islam Malaya =

- KIM
- Klang, Malaysia, Selangor

Information
- Religious affiliation: Islam
- Established: 1955
- Status: Closed
- Closed: 1967
- Age range: 16–22
- Language: Malay, English
- Alumni: ALKIS

Kolej Islam Malaya (KIM) or Muslim College Malaya was a premier, independent religious school in Malaysia. It is the first recognised Islamic education institute by the Federation of Malaya government.

== History ==
The erection of a religious higher education institution by the Malays were started since before the independence of Malaya. It is not an easy pathway since the English colonisation is still there in Malaya. Since mass secularisation of Malays were extensively done by the coloniser, the requirement for an Islamic College become increased to preserved the continuance of religious, politics and social of the Muslim Malays. The ideas of an Islamic College were proposed by Za'ba in Al-Ikhwan magazine, 16 January 1927. Za'ba wanted an Islamic College like Muhammadan Anglo-Oriental College, India. The founder of the college were Almarhum Maulana Mohamed Abdul Alim Siddiqui and Almarhum Dato' Syed Ibrahim Omar Al-Sagoff. This issue were highlighted by both influential Malay-Islamic political party, UMNO & PAS, also by Melayu Raya newspaper.

Meeting between ulamak of Malaya in Muar, Johore(21–22 February 1950) which sponsored by UMNO agreed anonymously of the idea.

Committee sponsors of KIM were formed in 20 Mac 1949. Report of The Muslim College Committee were finalised on 19 September 1949. With endorsement from Sultan of Pahang and Selangor don't able to prevent the coloniser from prohibiting the erection of the college. In 1952, Tuanku Abdul Rahman proposed the college to be built in the same route as the missionary schools. Initially, the schools were proposed to be built in Skudai, Johore.

The school were built through public-funding. PAS even held a week named "Minggu Kolej Islam" for funding. It also gain funds from Chinese taikun and Arabic government such as Arab Saudi and Kuwait. The first batch consisted of 58 students with the highest students hailing from Kelantan. There are also two professor from Al-Azhar University.

This college was established in 1374 AH/1955 AD and named Kolej Islam Malaya with Tuan Ismail Umar Abdul Aziz as the first headmaster. The college opened its door to female students in 1960.

== Buildings ==
It was erected on a piece of land measuring approximately 14.3 acres (6 ha) located at Jalan Kota Raja, which is about one and a half miles from Klang. The college was initially a palace then benefacted by Sultan Hisamuddin Alam Shah Al-Haj, son of the late Sultan Alaeddin Sulaiman Shah. He hoped that the college would produce scholars who fear Allah, and thus illuminate the society with the spirit of Islam and eliminate all forms of unbelief and ignorance that exist.

== Relocation ==
In 1386 AH/1966 AD, Highest Certificate of Kolej Islam Malaya was moved to a new building in Petaling Jaya (now Foundation Centre of International Islamic University Malaysia) and then to Bangi (which became the Faculty of Islamic Studies Universiti Kebangsaan Malaysia). However, course preparation is still performed in Klang.

When Universiti Kebangsaan Malaysia (UKM) has been established, the Islamic Colleges were absorbed into a faculty and upgraded as the Faculty of Islamic Studies. The college preparation in Klang has been taken over by the Ministry of Education in 1967 and was made into a boarding school. The students who excelled in the examination SRP offered to Klang Islamic College.

== Objectives ==
KIM was established to serve as the epitome of higher learning for Muslims youth in Malaya well as in Southeast Asian region. KIM is a center of higher learning offering Highest Certificate of Islamic Colleges equivalent to a BA Al-Azhar University. Students who graduate from the Islamic College admitted to pursue postgraduate studies at Al-Azhar University. It also function to serve as the base for the foundation of the nation's Islamic university.

== Administration ==
Initially, the Islamic College were administrated by Committee Sponsors of KIM. After the erection, it were governed by Majlis Kolej Islam Malaya (MKIM) with the education powers belongs to the Islamic College Mudir helped by a Senate Council. KIM held partnership with Universiti Malaya at 1958.

== Revival as Universiti Islam Malaysia ==
On 8 April 2011 a meeting was held between the Hon. Tan Sri Dr. Mohd Yusof Noor, chairman of the partially paralysed by YB Dato 'Seri Mohammed Khaled Nordin, Minister of Higher Education in the Office of the Minister of Higher Education Ministry Parcel E, Putrajaya. The meeting was held to inform efforts to reactivate partially paralysed KIM and discuss matters related to the establishment of the Islamic University of Malaysia. The meeting was held a string of support of the Council of Rulers to-222 times in 13 to 14 October 2010 at the National Palace to revive the Islamic College in the name of Islamic University Malaysia.

== See also ==
- Kolej Islam Sultan Alam Shah – Successor for Kolej Islam Malaya
- Universiti Kebangsaan Malaysia
- Muhammadan Anglo-Oriental College
