= Ministry of Education (Brunei) =

Government ministry of Brunei

- Kementerian Pendidikan كمنترين ڤنديديقن
- National emblem of Brunei

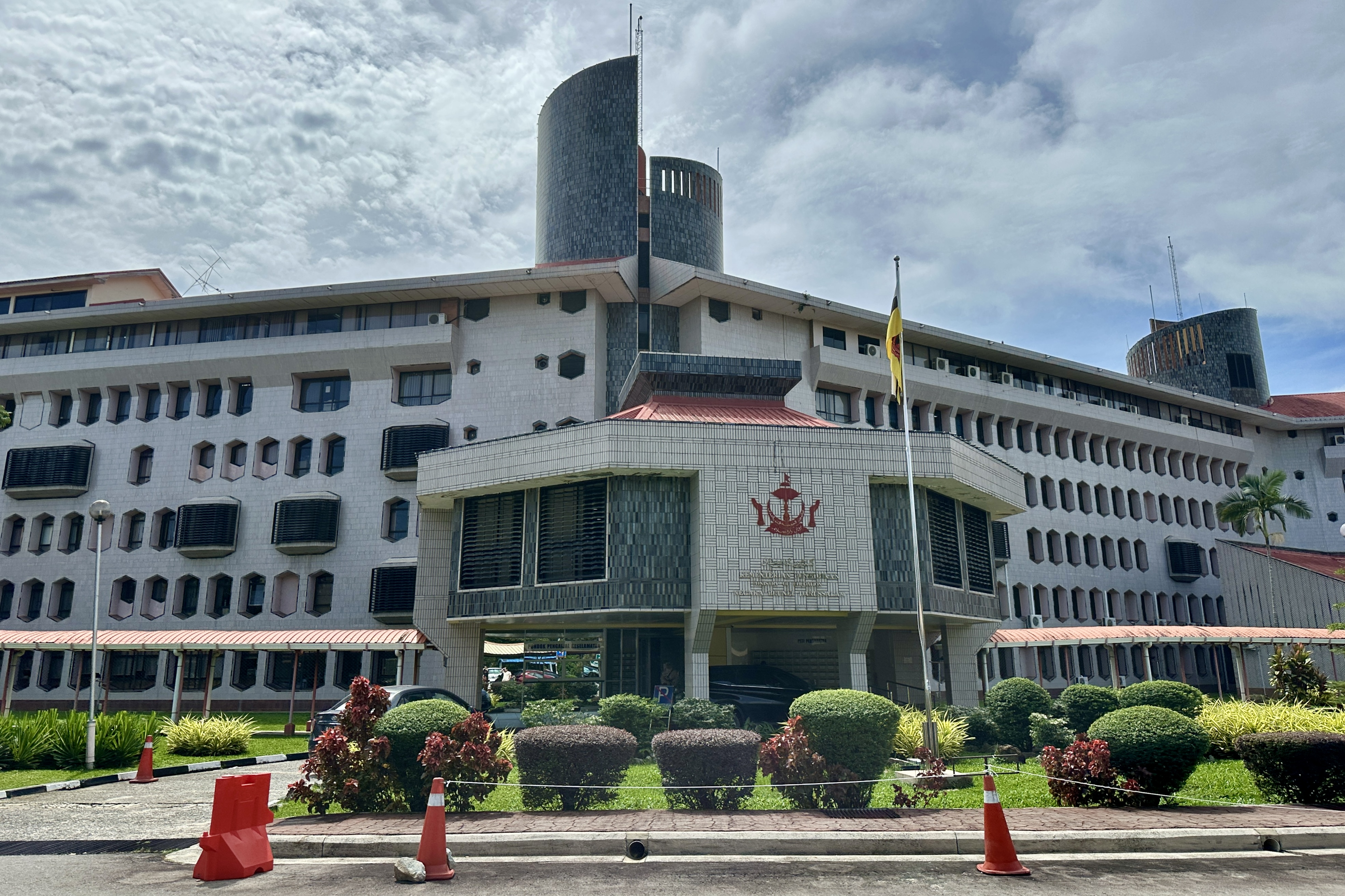
- The headquarters in 2025

Ministry overview
- Formed: 1 January 1984; 41 years ago
- Jurisdiction: Government of Brunei
- Headquarters: Jalan Lapangan Terbang Lama Berakas, Bandar Seri Begawan BB3510, Brunei; 4°55′33.9″N 114°55′51.2″E
- Employees: 11,061 (2024)
- Annual budget: ▼$583 million BND (2022)
- Minister responsible: Romaizah Mohd Salleh (Note: The official Malay name upon the appointment was Datin Seri Paduka Dr. Dayang Hajah Romaizah binti Haji Mohd. Salleh.), Minister of Education
- Website: www.moe.gov.bn

The Ministry of Education (MoE; Malay: Kementerian Pendidikan) is a cabinet-level ministry in the government of Brunei which oversees education in the country. It was established immediately upon Brunei's independence on 1 January 1984. It is currently led by a minister and the incumbent is Romaizah Mohd Salleh who took office since 7 June 2022. The ministry is headquartered in Bandar Seri Begawan.

== History ==
With the founding of the Jabatan Pelajaran (Department of Education) in 1951, under the direction of the British Resident and with assistance from local educators, Brunei's educational framework started to take shape. Sultan Omar Ali Saifuddien III gained responsibility over internal matters, including education, with the enactment of the 1959 Brunei Constitution. The State Education Officer was nonetheless in charge of the department in spite of this.

The purpose of the 1970 establishment of the Suruhanjaya Pelajaran, 'Education Commission' was to assess and enhance Brunei's educational system. The Department of Education established the Examination Unit, Examination Board, and Education Council in 1974 in response to the 1972 Education Commission Report. The Administration and Services Division, Education Planning and Development Division, and School and College Division were established by 1980, expanding the department's organisational structure. Local citizen Ahmad Jumat was first appointed as Pemangku Pengarah Pendidikan (Acting Director of Education) in 1976, and confirmed in 1977.

Following independence the Department of Education was led by a minister and called the Kementerian Pelajaran dan Kesihatan (Ministry of Education and Health). The ministry has introduced a number of new divisions or units, including the Planning and Information Unit, the Secondary Division, the Publication Unit, the External Activities Division, the Curriculum Development Division, and the Primary Division. A few divisions or sections were elevated to departments in 1987. A few of these include the Department of Planning, Development, and Research; the Department of Schools; the Department of Examinations; the Department of School Inspection; and the Department of Administration and Services.

The Ministry of Education and the Ministry of Health were split off in 1989 to become the two distinct ministries. A more regional approach to texts, school curriculum, and certification resulted from this restructure. The National Approval Recognition Council (1990), Brunei Darussalam Technical and Vocational Education Council (1991), Department of Technical Education (1993), Special Education Unit (1994), Co-curricular Department (1995, later renamed in 1997), National Education Council (1999), Science Technology and Environment Cooperation Center (1999), Department of Information and Communication Technology (2001), and the Planning and Estate Management Department (2002) were among the new bodies and departments established to support the implementation of educational changes and achieve national educational goals.

The problems of the 21st century were met by upgrading the current educational services and introducing new ones, such as ICT programs centered on e-education (e.g., edunet, e-learning, education information, digital libraries, and human capacity building). The Department of Information and Communication Technology was founded in 2001 to aid in the execution of various ICT programs at the ministry and school levels.

== Budget ==
In the fiscal year 2022–23, the ministry has been allocated a budget of B$583 million (Note: ≈US$419 million as of July 2022), a 23 percent decrease from the previous year.

== List of ministers ==
No.	Portrait	Minister	Term start	Term end	Time in office	Deputy
State Education Officer
1		James Pearce	1949	16 February 1953	3–4 years	–
2		H. J. Padmore	3 March 1953	1959	3 years, 227 days	–
3		Idris Babji	c. 1960	c. 1961	1 year	–
4		Malcolm MacInnes	c. 1962	c. 1973	10–11 years	–
Director of Education
1		A. D. Bumford	c. 1974	1 June 1976	1–2 years	Ahmad Jumat
2		Ahmad Jumat	1977	1982	5 years	–
Minister of Education
1		Abdul Aziz Umar	1 January 1984	20 October 1986	2 years, 292 days	Ahmad Jumat
2		Abdul Rahman Taib	20 October 1986	30 November 1988	2 years, 41 days	Ahmad Jumat
(1)		Abdul Aziz Umar	30 November 1988	24 May 2005	16 years, 175 days	Ahmad Jumat
(1)		Abdul Aziz Umar	30 November 1988	24 May 2005	16 years, 175 days	Suyoi Osman
(2)		Abdul Rahman Taib	24 May 2005	29 May 2010	5 years, 5 days	Pengiran Mohammad
3		Abu Bakar Apong	29 May 2010	22 October 2015	5 years, 146 days	Yusoff Ismail
4		Suyoi Osman	22 October 2015	29 January 2018	2 years, 99 days	Pengiran Bahrom
5		Hamzah Sulaiman	29 January 2018	7 June 2022	4 years, 129 days	Romaizah Salleh
6		Romaizah Salleh	7 June 2022	Incumbent	2 years, 319 days	–

== See also ==
- Ministry of Education and Culture (Indonesia)
- Ministry of Education (Malaysia)
- Ministry of Education (Singapore)
