= Ministry of Religious Affairs (Brunei) =

Government ministry of Brunei

- Kementerian Hal Ehwal Ugama
- National emblem of Brunei

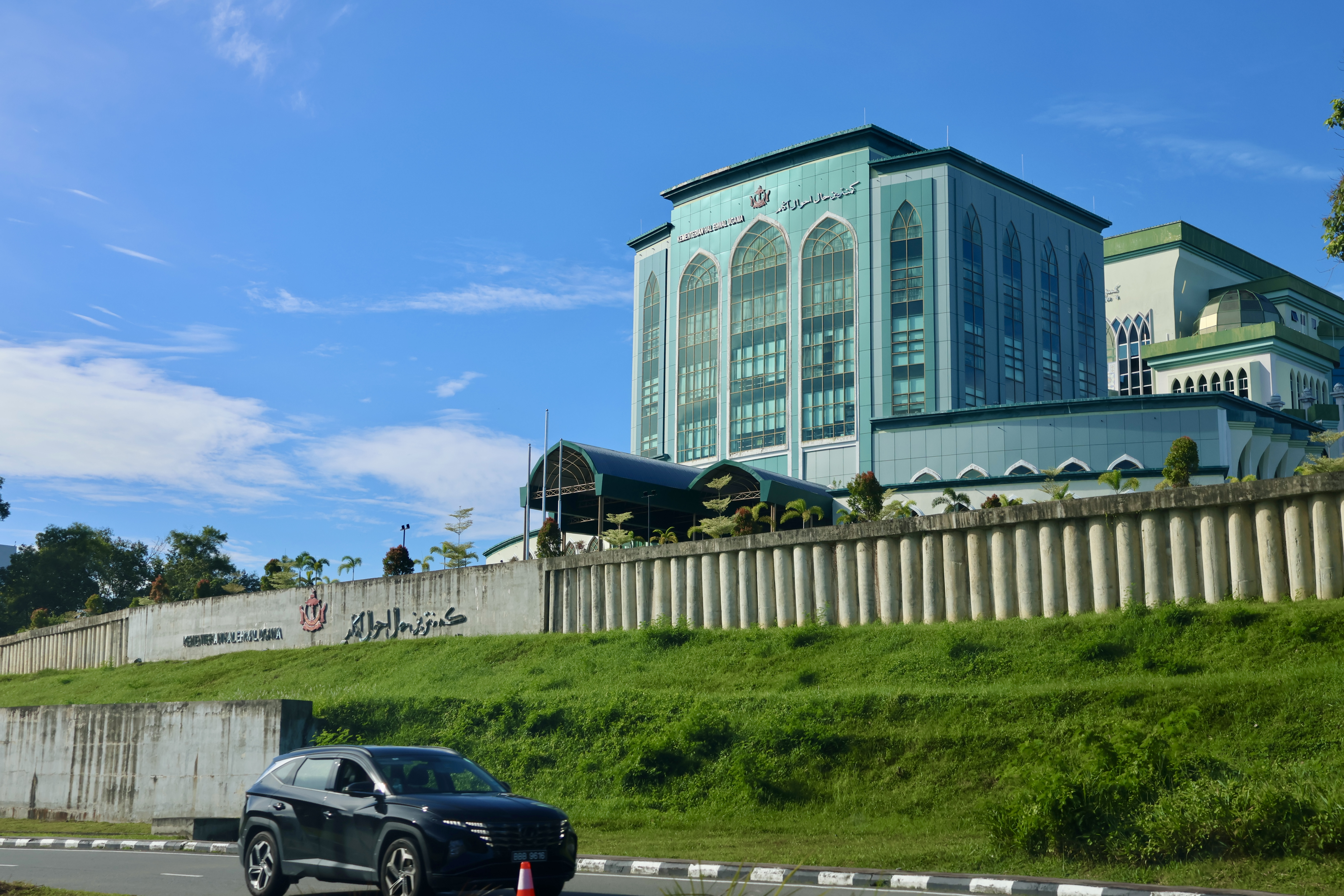
- Ministry of Religious Affairs building

Ministry overview
- Formed: 1 January 1984
- Preceding Ministry: Department of Customs, Religious and Social Welfare
- Jurisdiction: Government of Brunei
- Headquarters: Bandar Seri Begawan, Brunei; 4°55′02.1″N 114°56′47.8″E
- Employees: 5,642 (2024)
- Annual budget: ▲$263 million BND (2021)
- Minister responsible: Pengiran Mohammad Tashim, Minister
- Website: www.kheu.gov.bn

The Ministry of Religious Affairs (MORA or MoRA; Malay: Kementerian Hal Ehwal Ugama, KHEU) is a cabinet-level ministry in the government of Brunei which is responsible for the propagation of Islam and its upholding as the state religion, as well as oversees the Islamic religious education in the country. It is currently led by Pengiran Mohammad Tashim, Minister of Religious Affairs. The ministry is headquartered in Bandar Seri Begawan.

== History ==
The Jabatan Adat Istiadat, Ugama dan Kebajikan Masyarakat (Department of Customs, Religious and Social Welfare) was established on 1 July 1954. Once located in the Royal Secretariat Building's General Office (now known as the Secretariat Building). The department was formed by designating Pengiran Anak Haji Mohamed Alam as the Pegawai Adat Istiadat, Ugama, and Kebajikan Masyarakat (Customs, Religious, and Social Welfare Officer) with the approval of Sultan Omar Ali Saifuddien III.

On 29 September 1959, the Religious Section was renamed the Department of Religious Affairs (Jabatan Hal Ehwal Ugama) under the power bestowed by the Brunei 1959 Constitution, with Pengiran Dato Seri Paduka Haji Ali serving as its new leader. On 21 October 1970, the construction of their new B$375,000 headquarters were completed in Tutong, near Hassanal Bolkiah Mosque.

== Budget ==
In the fiscal year 2021–2022, the ministry had been allocated a budget of B$263 million, (Note: ≈US$190 million as of July 2022) a two percent increase from the previous year.

== List of ministers ==
=== Ministers ===
No.	Portrait	Minister	Term start	Term end	Time in office	Ref.
Chief of Adat Istiadat Negara
–		Pengiran Anak Mohamed Alam	1 July 1954	29 September 1959	5 years, 90 days	
State Religious Affairs Officer
1		Pengiran Muhammad Ali	1 May 1960	August 1962	2 years	
2		Pengiran Anak Kemaluddin	1 September 1962	1970	8 years	
3		Zain Serudin	1 November 1970	1 January 1984	13 years, 61 days	
Minister of Religious Affairs
1		Zain Serudin	20 October 1986	29 May 2010	23 years, 221 days	
2		Pengiran Mohammad	29 May 2010	22 October 2015	5 years, 146 days	
3		Badaruddin Othman	22 October 2015	4 June 2026	10 years, 234 days	
4		Pengiran Mohammad Tashim	4 June 2026	Incumbent		

=== Deputy minister ===
No.	Portrait	Minister	Term start	Term end	Time in office	Ref.
1		Yahya Ibrahim	20 October 1986	25 May 2005	18 years, 217 days	
2		Badaruddin Othman	25 May 2005	29 May 2010	5 years, 4 days	
3		Pengiran Bahrom	29 May 2010	22 October 2015	5 years, 146 days	
4		Abdul Mokti Daud	22 October 2015	30 January 2018	2 years, 100 days	
(3)		Pengiran Bahrom	30 January 2018	21 May 2022	4 years, 111 days	
5		Pengiran Mohammad Tashim	21 May 2022	4 June 2026	4 years, 23 days	
