= Brunei Postal Services Department =

Brunei postal department

- Jabatan Perkhidmatan Pos جابتن ڤرخدمتن ڤوس

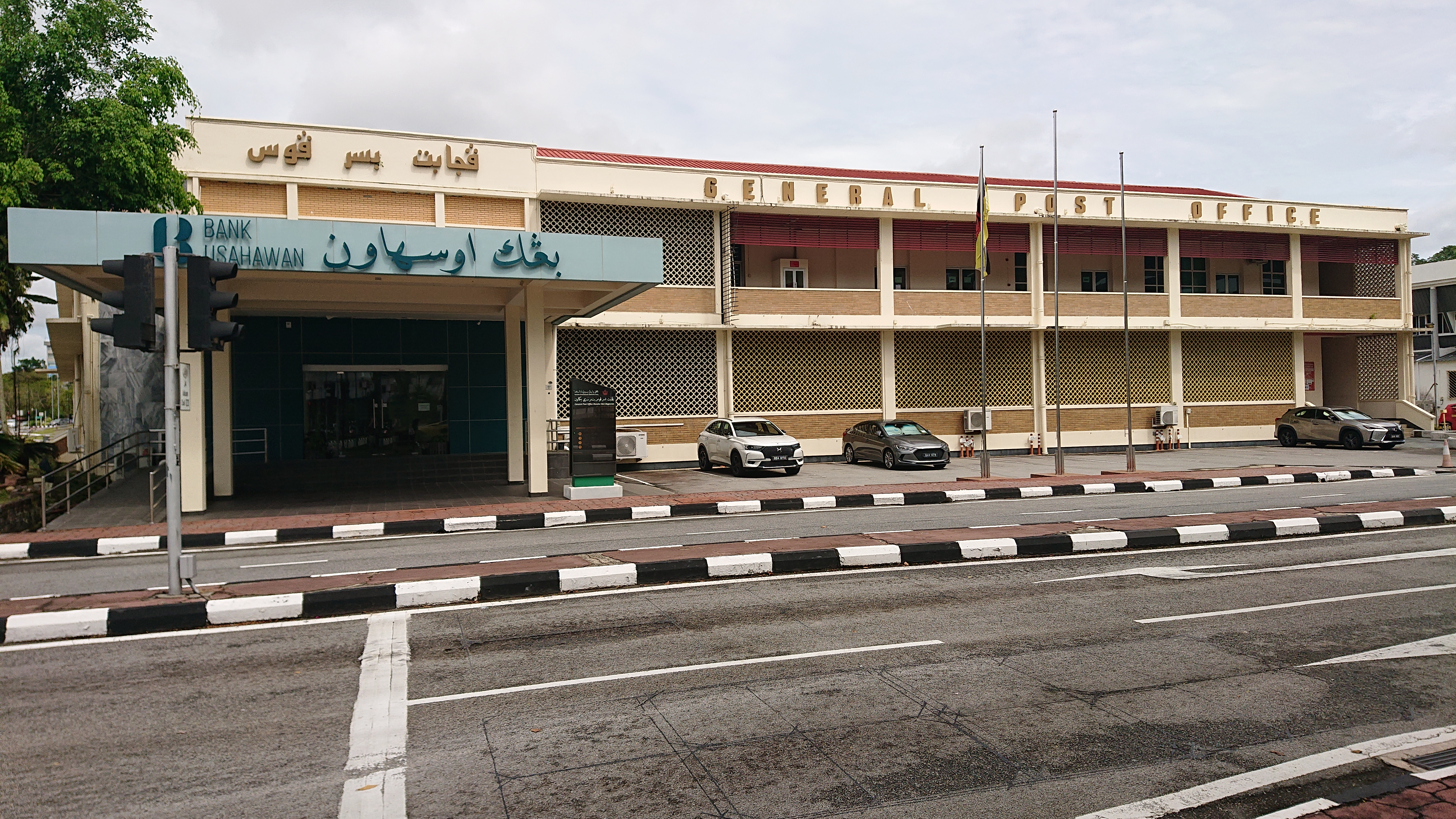
- Headquarters in Pusat Bandar, Brunei

Agency overview
- Formed: 1906; 120 years ago
- Dissolved: 2026; 0 years ago
- Superseding agency: Posbru Sdn Bhd
- Jurisdiction: Government of Brunei
- Headquarters: Jalan Elizabeth II, Jabatan Perkhidmatan Pos, Bandar Seri Begawan BB3610, Brunei; 04°53′27″N 114°56′34″E
- Minister responsible: Pengiran Shamhary, Minister of Transport and Infocommunications
- Agency executive: Rosdi Abdul Aziz (Acting), Postmaster General
- Parent agency: Ministry of Transport and Infocommunications
- Website: www.post.gov.bn

The Postal Services Department (Malay: Jabatan Perkhidmatan Pos) was a government department responsible for providing postal services in Brunei.

== History ==
A postage stamp dated 24 April 1894, bearing the Brooketon postmark (present-day Muara), is among the earliest stamps used in Brunei. This Sarawak stamp was issued from a small post office established in 1893 to serve the coal-mining community at Rajah Charles Brooke's Brooketon colliery. Operated by the Sarawak government, the post office provided a monthly postal service to and from Kuching. In 1895, the first post office was established by the Borneo Company Limited.

Following the signing of the Treaty of Friendship on 11 October 1906, a formal post office was established. Constructed under the guidance of Brunei's British Resident, it was located in Brunei Town. In that same year, the first stamps used in Brunei were actually overprinted stamps from the nearby island of Labuan. The following year, stamps featuring a unique design of a scene on the Brunei River were released. Up until 1951, this style was still in use, but with variations in colour. Up to 1965, the frequency of commemorative publications was similarly modest. Since then, there have typically been three or more sets released annually. In terms of design, they adhere to the British model by featuring a portrait of the sultan of Brunei at the side or corner of the main stamp design.

Shortly after independence of Brunei in 1984, the Postal Services Department has been under the control of the Ministry of Communications (present-day Ministry of Transport and Infocommunications). Brunei became the 168th member of the Universal Postal Union (UPU) on 15 January 1985.

Only 9.4 million letters were handled in 2003, the lowest mail volume in Brunei, down from 13.2 million in 2001. The volume increased by 9.7 million in 2004 and 11.5 million in 2005, respectively. On 7 November 2006, the Minister of Communications, Abu Bakar Apong, inaugurated the Stamps Gallery and a special stamp issue commemorating the 100th anniversary of postal services. On 6 February 2007, when it introduced a Joint Thematic Stamp Issue with Malaysia. Malaysian High Commissioner Ali Abdullah attended the ceremony, which was conducted by Deputy Minister of Communications Yusoff Abdul Hamid at the capital's General Post Office.

On 27 April 2023, at the UPU International Bureau in Bern, the Postal Services Department was recognised with the Express Mail Service (EMS) Customer Care Award 2022 for excellence in EMS services.

== Services ==
Stamps, bulk posting, air/sea parcel services, mail insurance, registered letters, express mail services, and postal orders were some of the core goods and services provided. Post offices have expanded their roles, allowing the community to handle tasks such as renewing driver's licenses and road tax and paying water, phone, and energy bills in one convenient location. As of 2008, Brunei has 24 post offices across the country, comprising three in Tutong, five in Belait, one in Temburong, and 15 in the Brunei-Muara district. Additionally, the nation features two micro post offices, 53 stamp sellers, and eight postal agents to further support its postal services.

== Corporatisation ==
The postal services department was corporatised on 1 January 2026 as part of a plan to reform the national postal services. All operations and businesses of the department were transferred to PosBru, a wholly-owned subsidiary of Darussalam Assets, a government‑owned holding company that owns and manages the country’s Government‑Linked Companies (GLCs).

== See also ==
- Postcodes in Brunei
- Postage stamps and postal history of Brunei
