= Order of Setia Negara Brunei =

Order of Brunei

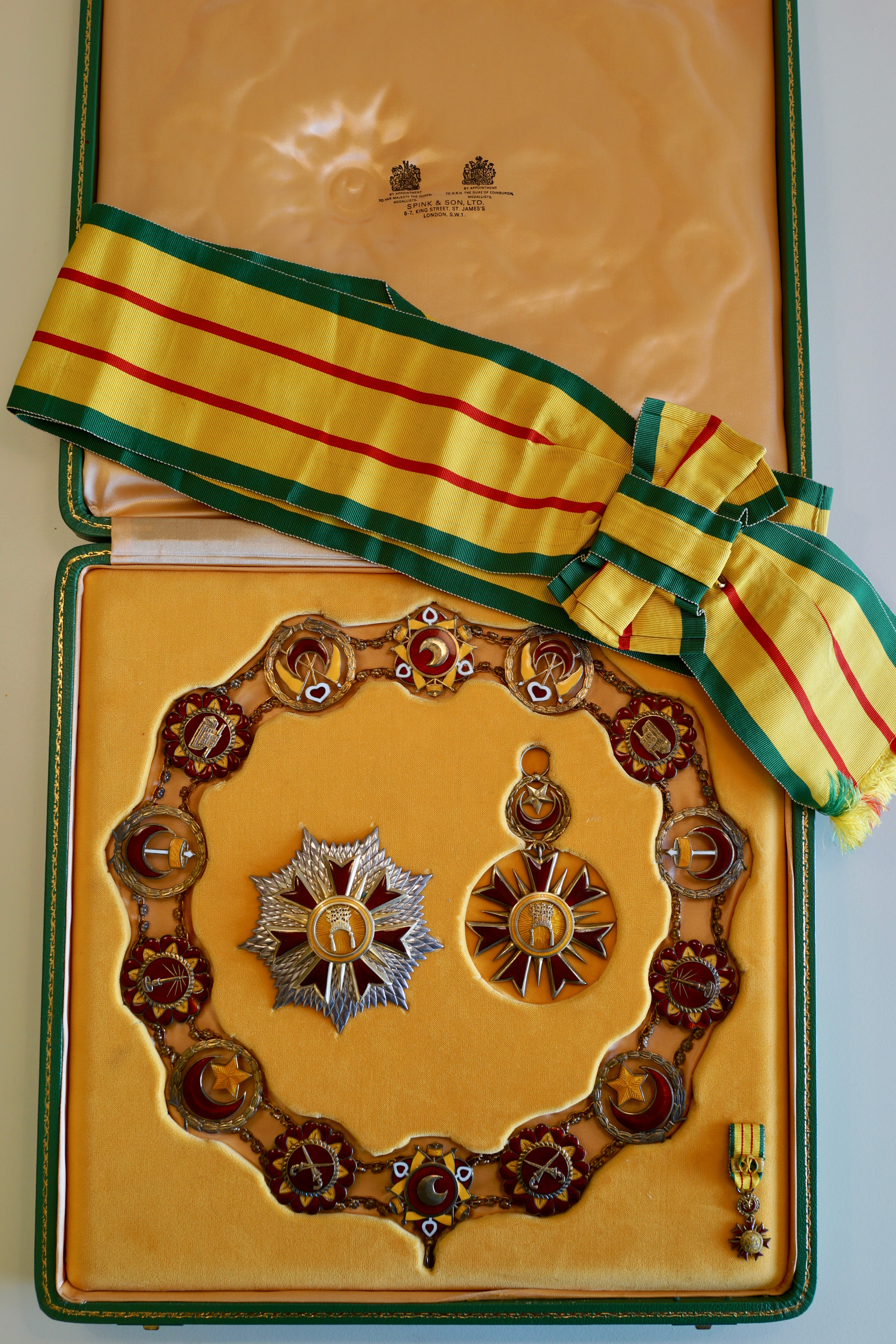
- PSNB neck decoration and sash

Awarded by the Sultan of Brunei
- Type: Order of chivalry
- Established: 1959
- Country: Brunei
- Awarded for: For committed, honourable, faithful, and exceptional service
- Status: Currently constituted
- Sovereign: Hassanal Bolkiah
- Grades: Grand Commander (PSNB); Commander (DSNB); Companion (SNB); Officer (PSB)

Precedence
- Next (higher): Order of Pahlawan Negara Brunei
- Next (lower): Order of Paduka Seri Laila Jasa
- (PSNB) (DSNB) (SNB) (PSB)

The Most Blessed Order of Setia Negara Brunei (Malay: Darjah Setia Negara Brunei Yang Amat Bahagia), also translated as The Most Blessed Order of Loyalty to the State of Brunei, is an order of Brunei Darussalam. It was established on 29 November 1959 by Sultan Omar Ali Saifuddien III.

== Current classes ==
The four classes of appointment to the Order are, from highest grade to lowest:

Class	Post-nominal	Title	Ribbon bar
Grand Commander	PSNB	Dato Seri Setia	
Commander	DSNB	Dato Setia	
Companion	SNB	–	
Officer	PSB	–	

== Description ==
The First Class included a 100 millimetres (3.9 inches) sash badge with a long neck riband, silver-gilt and enamel, good very fine, and a star and crescent suspension measuring 67 millimetres (2.6 inches).

== Recipients ==
For committed, honourable, faithful, and exceptional service. It is given to non-military personnel.

=== First Class ===
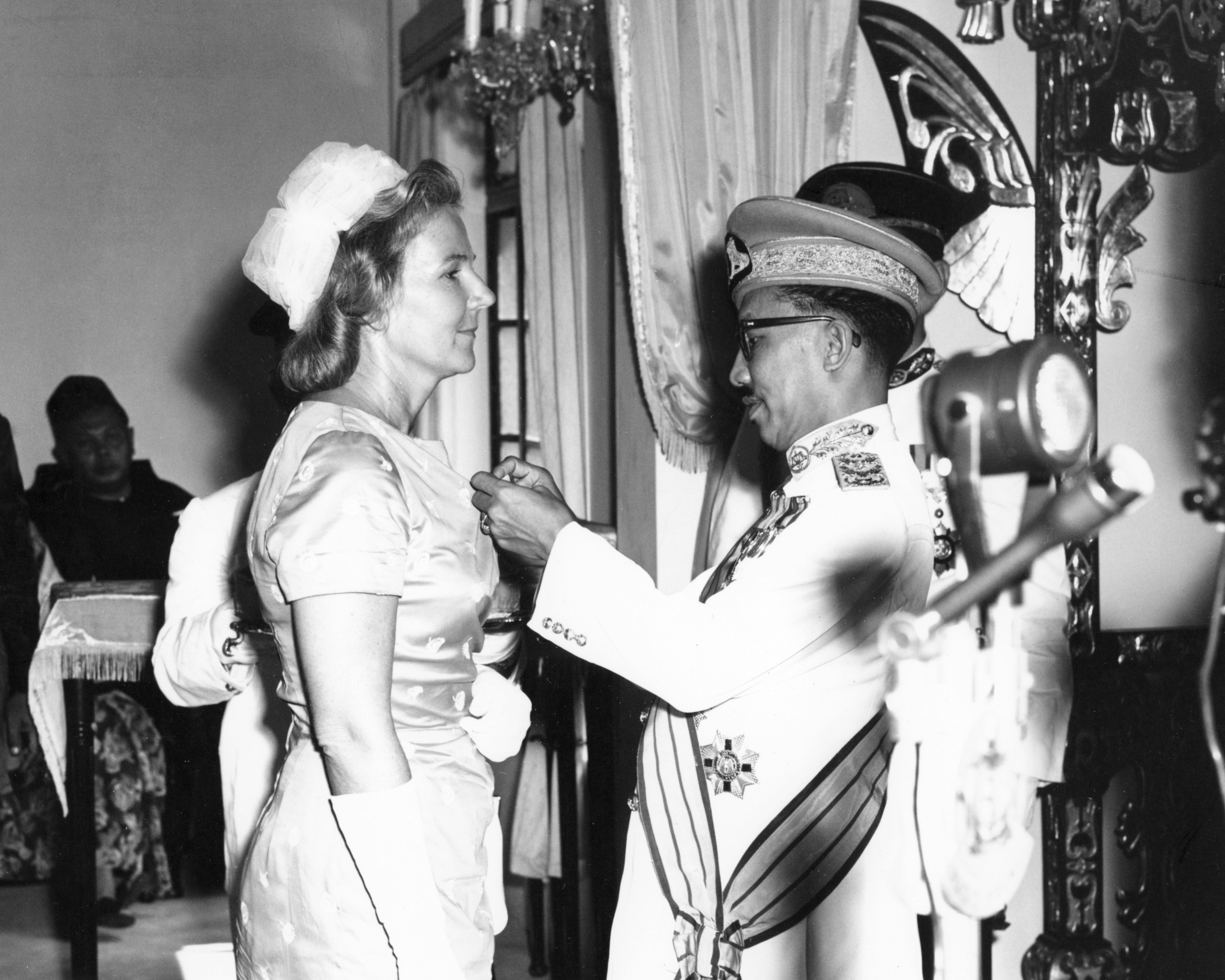
Sultan Omar Ali Saifuddien III seen wearing the order's sash in 1960

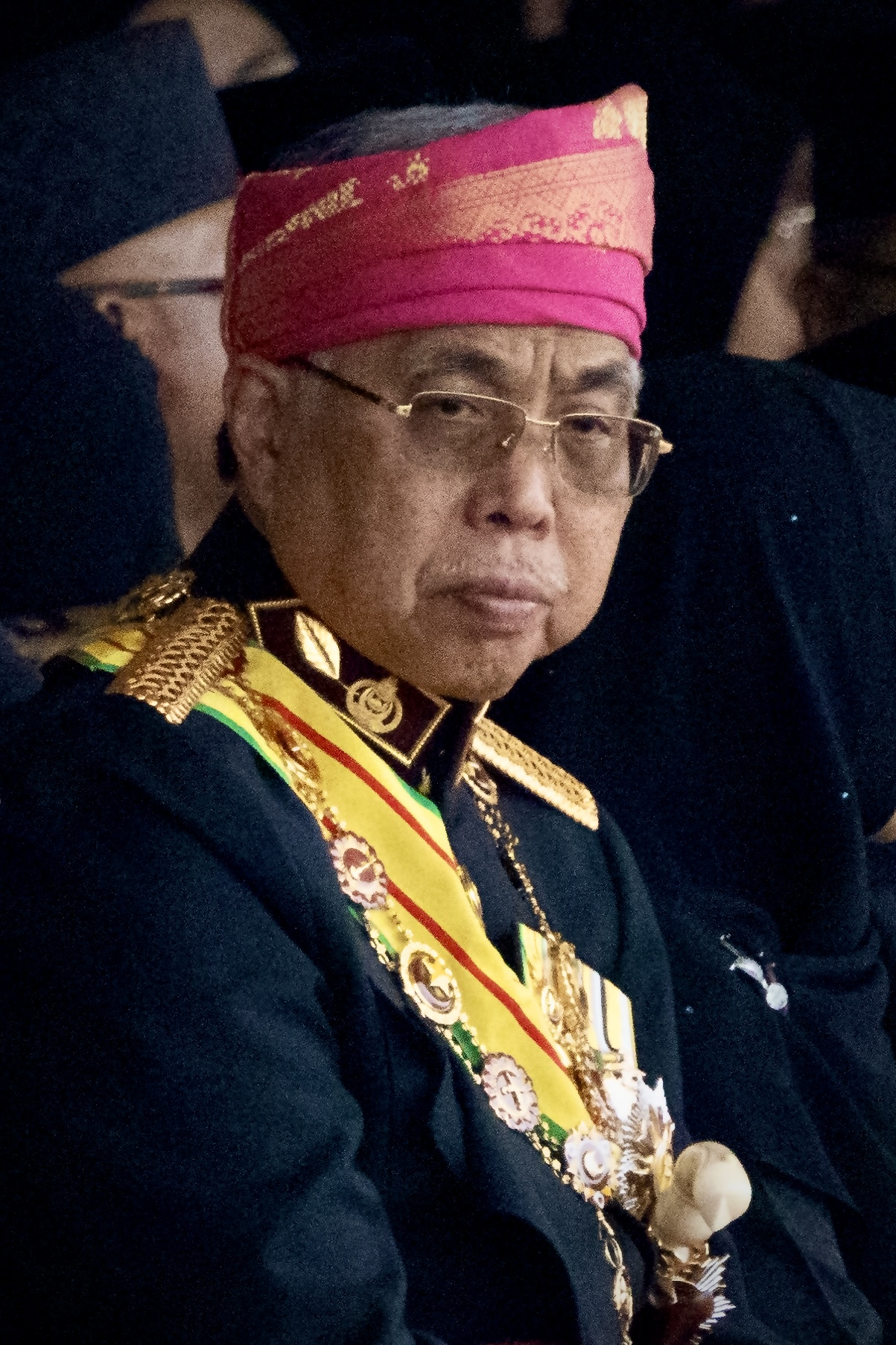
Adanan Yusuf wearing the order's sash in 2024

- Unknown – Hassanal Bolkiah – Sultan of Brunei
- Unknown – Omar Ali Saifuddien III – Sultan of Brunei
- Unknown – Abdul Rahman Taib – Speaker of Legislative Council
- Unknown – Mustappa Sirat – Minister of Communications
- Unknown – Ali Apong – Minister of Culture, Youth and Sports
- Unknown – Yahya Bakar – Minister of Industry and Primary Resources
- Unknown – Hazair Abdullah – Minister of Culture, Youth and Sports
- Unknown – Zakaria Sulaiman – Minister of Communications
- Unknown – Pengiran Bahrin – Minister of Communications
- Unknown – Pengiran Mohammed Abdul Rahman Piut – Member of Privy Council
- Unknown – Pengiran Anak Siti Saerah – daughter of Sultan Ahmad Tajuddin
- 1967 – Yusof Husain – Member of Tujuh Serangkai
- 1976 – Ali Hussain Muhammad – Manteri Istana
- 1976 – Marianne E. Lloyd-Dolbey – Personal Secretary to Sultan Omar Ali Saifuddien III
- 2002 – Abu Bakar Apong – Minister of Health
- 2002 – Ahmad Jumat – Minister of Development
- 2002 – Al-Sayed Walid Ismail Al-Kurdi – husband of Princess Basma bint Talal
- 2006 – Abdullah Bakar – Minister of Development
- 2006 – Adanan Yusof – Minister of Home Affairs
- 2006 – Suyoi Osman – Minister of Development
- 2006 – Yahya Bakar – Minister of Industry and Primary Resources
- 2006 – Abdul Rahman Ibrahim – Minister of Finance II
- 2006 – Lim Jock Seng – Minister of Foreign Affairs and Trade II
- 2011 – Yasmin Umar – Minister of Energy
- 2011 – Pengiran Mohammad Abdul Rahman – Minister of Religious Affairs
- 2011 – Hazair Abdullah – Minister of Culture, Youth and Sports
- 2016 – Zulkarnain Hanafi – Minister of Health
- 2016 – Bahrin Abdullah – Minister of Development
- 2018 – Isham Jaafar – Minister of Health
- 2018 – Abdul Mokti – Minister at the Prime Minister's Office
- 2018 – Amin Liew – Minister of Finance and Economy II
- 2018 – Erywan Yusof – Minister of Foreign Affairs II
- 2018 – Suhaimi Gafar – Minister of Development
- 2018 – Mat Suny – Minister of Energy and Industry
- 2018 – Hamzah Sulaiman – Minister of Education
- 2018 – Abdul Mutalib Yusof – Minister of Communications
- 2022 – Nazmi Mohamad – Minister of Culture, Youth and Sports
- 2022 – Romaizah Mohd Salleh – Minister of Education
- 2022 – Juanda Abdul Rashid – Minister of Development
- 2022 – Pengiran Shamhary – Minister of Transport and Infocommunications
- 2022 – Ahmaddin Abdul Rahman – Minister of Home Affairs
- 2024 – Abang Abdul Rahman Johari – Premier of Sarawak

=== Second Class ===
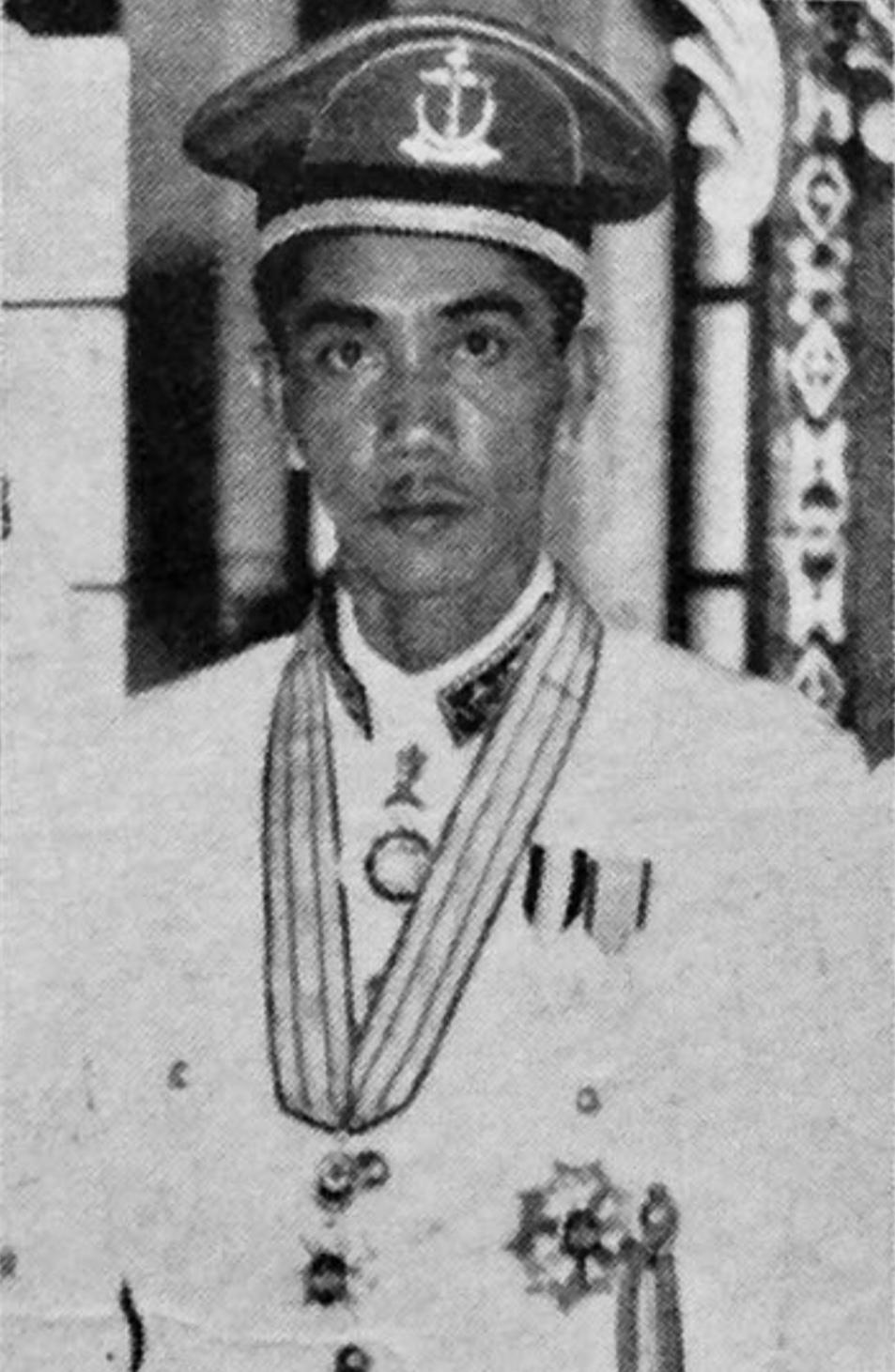
Pengiran Yusuf wearing his DSNB in 1961

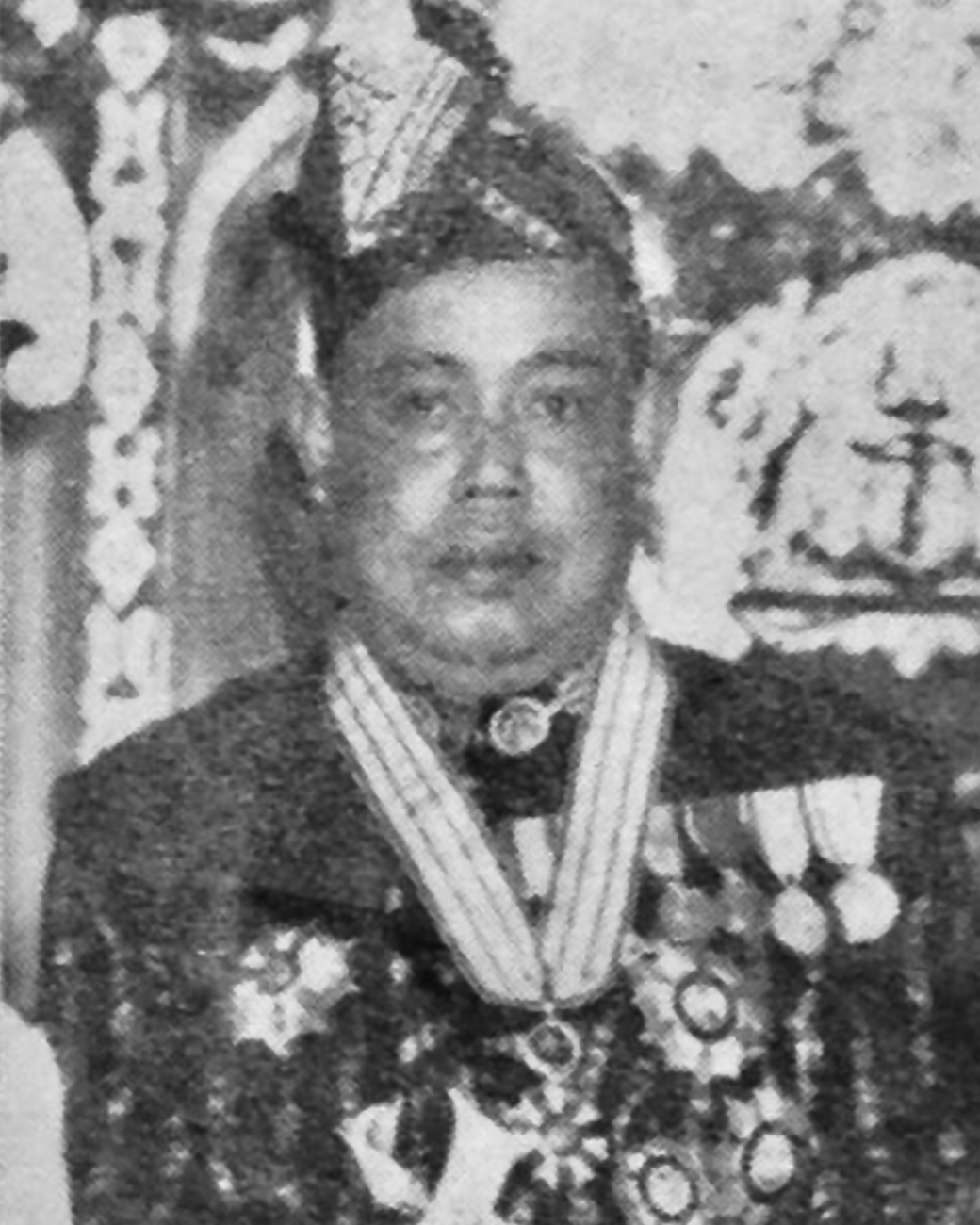
Alam Abdul Rahman with his DSNB in 1961

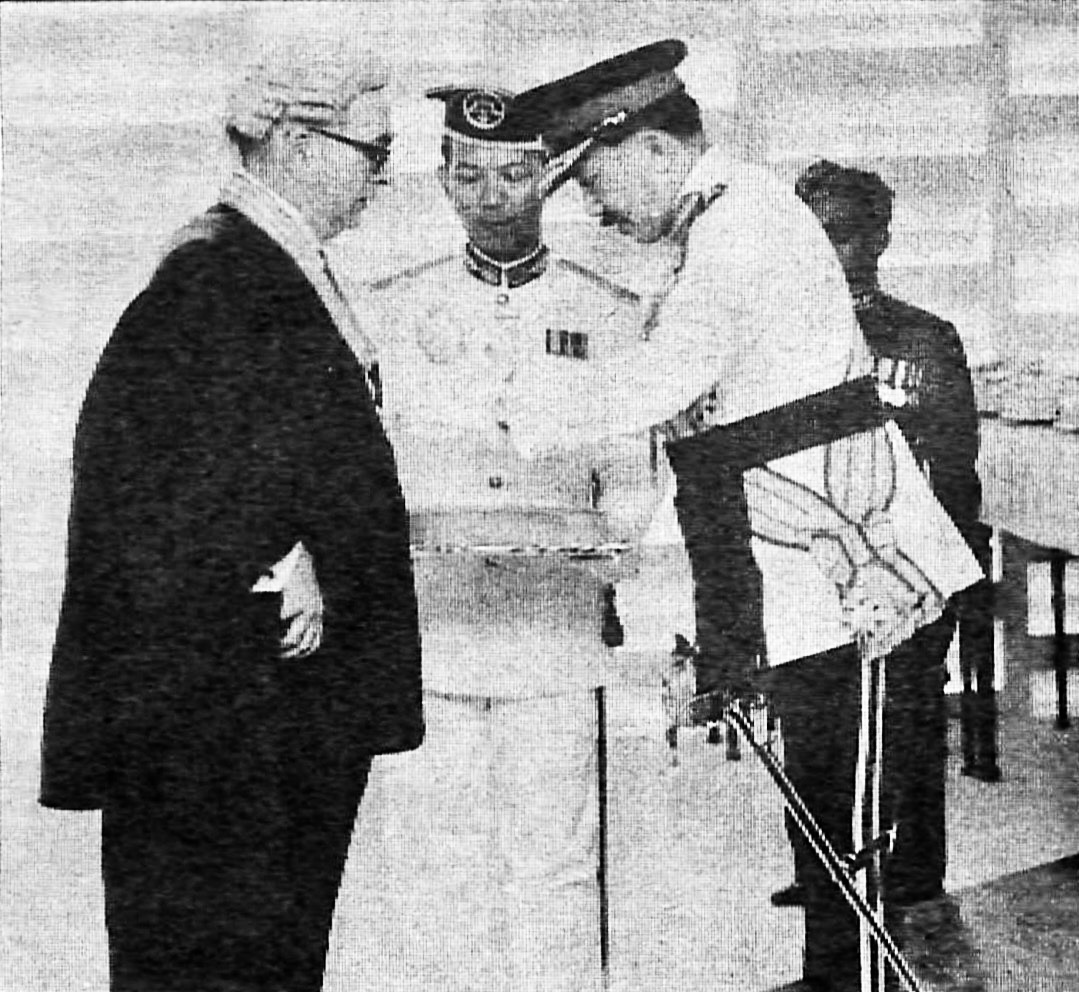
Idris Talog Davies being awarded the DSNB by Sultan Omar Ali Saifuddien III in 1966

- Unknown – Marsal Maun – Menteri Besar
- Unknown – Pengiran Muhammad Yusuf – Menteri Besar
- Unknown – Pengiran Abdul Momin Ismail – Menteri Besar
- Unknown – Pengiran Muhammad Ali – Deputy Menteri Besar
- Unknown – Isa Ibrahim – Minister at the Prime Minister's Office
- Unknown – Abbas Al-Sufri – Acting Personal Secretary to Sultan Omar Ali Saifuddien III
- Unknown – Ibrahim Mohd Jahfar – Speaker of Legislative Council
- Unknown – Pengiran Anak Mohamed Alam – Speaker of Legislative Council
- Unknown – Major General Pengiran Ibnu Basit – Commander of the Royal Brunei Navy
- Unknown – Lieutenant Colonel John Simpson – Commander of the Royal Brunei Malay Regiment
- Unknown – Pengiran Umar – Commissioner of Police
- Unknown – Hussain Mohammad Yusof – Minister of Culture, Youth and Sports
- Unknown – Pengiran Abu Bakar – Speaker of Legislative Council
- Unknown – Abdul Hamid Bakal – Member of the Legislative Council
- Unknown – James Richard Henry Burns – Commissioner of Police
- Unknown – George Edwin Coster – Assistant Commissioner in the Special Branch
- Unknown – James Richard Henry Burns – Commissioner of Police
- Unknown – Ahmad Daud – Member of Privy Council
- Unknown – Abdullah Hanafi – Member of State Council
- 1960 – Pengiran Abu Bakar Salleh – Speaker of Legislative Council
- 1962 – Pengiran Jaya – Commissioner of Police
- 1962 – Eric Ernest Falk Pretty – British Resident to Brunei
- 1966 – Idris Talog Davies – Attorney General of Brunei
- 1966 – B. Hanafi
- 1968 – Pengiran Abdul Momin Othman – Member of Privy Council
- 1968 – Pengiran Mokhtar Puteh – Member of Privy Council
- 1971 – William lan Glass – Controller of Civil Aviation and Establishment Officer
- 1971 – William John Peel – British Resident to Brunei
- 1973 – Geoffrey Briggs – Chief Justice of the Supreme Court of Brunei Darussalam
- 2006 – Abdul Hapidz – Member of the Legislative Council
- 2012 – Samuel Yapp Kai San – Chairman of the RIPAS Clinical Service Committee

=== Third Class ===
Typical Bruneian recipients include Permanent Secretaries.

- Unknown – Colonel Abdul Jalil – Commander of the Royal Brunei Navy
- Unknown – Lim Cheng Choo – Member of Privy Council
- Unknown – Yusoff Abdul Hamid – Deputy Minister of Communications
- Unknown – Kifrawi Kifli – Chief Justice of Brunei
- Unknown – Hasrin Sabtu – Brunei Commissioner of Police
- Unknown – Maidin Hashim – Diplomat
- Unknown – Onn Siew Siong – member of Manteri
- Unknown – Lieutenant Colonel Musa – Commander of the Training Institute
- 1970 – Hong Kok Tin – Member of the Legislative Council
- 1991 – Matussin Omar – Director of Brunei Museum
- 1993 – Hamdillah Abdul Wahab – Deputy Minister of Industry and Primary Resources
- 1993 – Dani Ibrahim – Deputy Minister of Home Affairs
- 2000 – Lim Jock Hoi – Secretary-General of ASEAN
- 2001 – Timothy Ong – Founder of Asia Inc Forum
- 2005 – Yakub Othman – Writer
- 2005 – Zainal Abidin Ali – Deputy Managing Director of Brunei Shell Petroleum
- 2005 – Abdul Ghani Metussin – Director of ASEAN-EC Management Centre
- 2005 – Matassim Jibah – Museum Director
- 2005 – Bujang Masu'ut – Director of Information
- 2005 – Nor Jeludin – Ambassador of Brunei to Japan
- 2005 – Omar Khalid – Vice-Chancellor of Institut Teknologi Brunei
- 2010 – Adina Othman – Deputy Minister of Culture, Youth and Sports
- 2010 – Rozan Yunos – Permanent Secretary at the Ministry of Development
- 2010 – Othman Uking – Member of the Legislative Council
- 2010 – Bahrin Mohd Noor – Assistant Senior Commissioner of Police
- 2010 – Abdul Wahab Omar – Acting Senior Commissioner of Police
- 2010 – Marzuke Mohsin – Director of Development
- 2010 – Emaleen Abdul Rahman Teo – Diplomat
- 2010 – Roselan Daud – Permanent Secretary at the Ministry of Foreign Affairs
- 2011 – Sulaiman Ahad – Permanent Secretary at the Ministry of Religious Affairs
- 2011 – Abdul Aziz Yussof – Permanent Secretary at the Ministry of Religious Affairs
- 2011 – Yahya Idris – Auditor General of Brunei
- 2011 – Salleh Bostaman – Managing Director of Brunei LNG
- 2013 – Mohamed Don Harith – Assistant Commissioner of Police
- 2013 – Roslin Bakar – Senior Superintendent of Police
- 2013 – Yahya Abdul Rahman – Director of Fire and Rescue Department
- 2017 – Shaikh Fadilah Ahmad – Permanent Secretary at the Ministry of Foreign Affairs and Trade
- 2017 – Noor Qamar Sulaiman – Senior Special Duties Officer at the Ministry of Foreign Affairs and Trade
- 2017 – Zohrah Sulaiman – Vice-Chancellor of UBD
- 2018 – Husaini Matzin – Senior Police Superintendent
- 2018 – Zaini Abdul Rahim – Senior Superintendent of Police
- 2019 – Norarfan Zainal – Rector of UNISSA
- 2022 – Siti Nirmala Mohammad – Permanent Secretary at the Prime Minister's Office
- 2022 – Nor Hashimah Taib – Attorney General of Brunei
- 2024 – Anie Haryani Rahman – Chief Executive Officer of Brunei Darussalam Food Authority
- 2025 – Captain Mohamad Sarif Pudin – Acting Commander of the Royal Brunei Navy

=== Fourth Class ===
- 15 July 2006 - Hajah Tursinah bte Hj. Shawal Pegawai Tugas-Tugas Khas Kanan
- Unknown – Brigadier General Wardi – Commander of the Royal Brunei Air Force
- Unknown – Brigadier General Shahril Anwar – Commander of the Royal Brunei Air Force
- Unknown – Brigadier General Sharif – Commander of the Royal Brunei Air Force
- Unknown – Colonel Mohammad Ismaon – Director of the Force Capability Development at the Ministry of Defence
- Unknown – Captain Khairil – Acting Deputy Commander of the Royal Brunei Navy
- Unknown – Khairunnisa Ash'ari – Member of the Legislative Council
- Unknown – Iswandy Ahmad – Member of the Legislative Council
- Unknown – First Admiral Spry – Commander of the Royal Brunei Navy
- Unknown – Brigadier General Shanonnizam – Commander of the Royal Brunei Land Force
- Unknown – Jammy Shah Al-Islam – Commissioner of Police
- Unknown – Yakub Abu Bakar – Deputy Minister of Finance
- Unknown – Sufian Sabtu – Deputy Minister at the Prime Minister's Office
- Unknown – Jemat Ampal – Diplomat
- Unknown – Pengiran Shariffuddin – Director of Brunei Museum
- Unknown – Taha Abdul Rauf – Member of Legislative Council
- 1963 – Abdul Rahman Taha – Member of Privy Council
- 2002 – Brigadier General Abdul Razak – Deputy Minister of Defence
- 2006 – Abu Sufian Ali – Deputy Director of the Department of Multilateral Economy
- 2008 – First Admiral Othman – Commander of the Royal Brunei Navy
- 2011 – Musa Adnin – Honorary Consul to Mexico in Brunei
- 2012 – Brigadier General Khairul – Commander of the Royal Brunei Land Force
- 2012 – Kwon Oh-son – Head coach of Brunei national football team
- 2012 – Irwan Hambali – Commissioner of Police
- 2016 – Colonel Alirupendi – Joint Force Commander
- 2019 – Nik Hafimi – Member of the Legislative Council

=== Former recipients ===
- 2006 – Nawawi Taha – Personal and Confidential Secretary to Sultan Hassanal Bolkiah
