= .bn =

Top-level Internet domain for Brunei

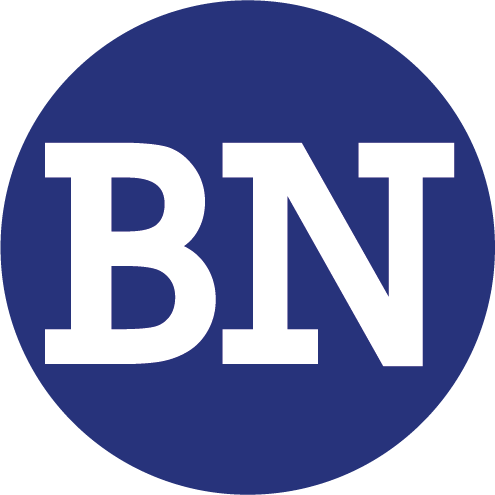
- Introduced: 3 June 1994
- TLD type: Country code top-level domain
- Status: Active
- Registry: BNNIC
- Sponsor: AITI
- Intended use: Entities connected with Brunei
- Registered domains: 1303 (January 7, 2022; 4 years ago)
- Registration restrictions: Bruneian presence required; third-level names have various restrictions depending on which second level label they are under
- Dispute policies: BDRP
- DNSSEC: Yes
- Registry website: bnnic.bn

.bn is the Internet country code top-level domain (ccTLD) for Brunei.

== Registration ==
The domain is administered by BNNIC, a unit under the Authority for Info-communications Technology Industry.

There are currently two registrars: Imagine and Datastream Digital.

== Second-level domains ==
In addition to registering directly under .bn for individuals, there are also several domains at the second level that can be registered under:

| Second level domain | Intended purpose |
|---|---|
| .com.bn | Commercial entities |
| .edu.bn | Educational institutions |
| .gov.bn | Government |
| .net.bn | Network providers |
| .org.bn | Non-profit organisations |
