= Abu Bakar Apong =

Bruneian civil servant and politician (born 1948)

Yang Dimuliakan Pehin Orang Kaya Seri Kerna Dato Seri Setia Abu Bakar Apong PSNB DSLJ SMB PHBS PIKB PKL
- ابو بكر اڤوڠ
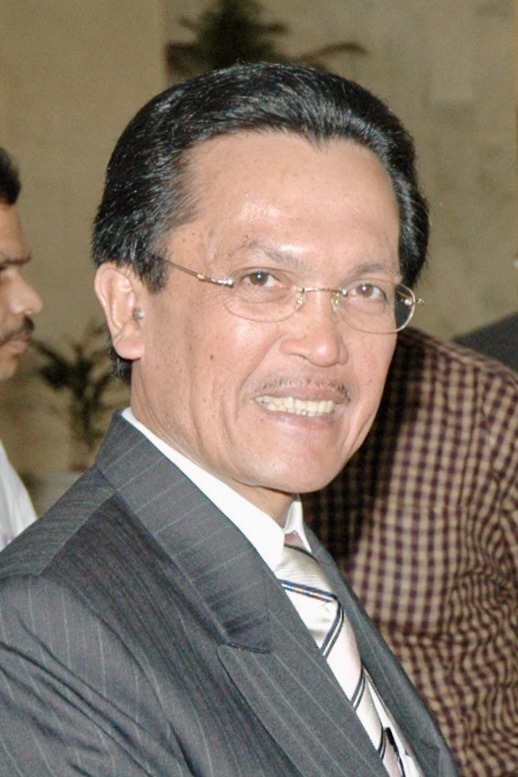
- Abu Bakar in 2006

5th Minister of Home Affairs
- In office 22 October 2015 – 7 June 2022
- Monarch: Hassanal Bolkiah
- Preceded by: Badaruddin Othman
- Succeeded by: Ahmaddin Abdul Rahman

3rd Minister of Education
- In office 29 May 2010 – 22 October 2015
- Deputy: Yusoff Ismail
- Preceded by: Abdul Rahman Taib
- Succeeded by: Suyoi Osman

4th Minister of Communications
- In office 24 May 2005 – 28 May 2010
- Deputy: Yusoff Abdul Hamid
- Preceded by: Zakaria Sulaiman
- Succeeded by: Abdullah Bakar

3rd Minister of Health
- In office 17 May 2002 – 23 May 2005
- Preceded by: Abdul Aziz Umar (Acting)
- Succeeded by: Suyoi Osman

Personal details
- Born: 19 September 1948 (age 77) Kampong Setia Pahlawan, Kampong Ayer, Brunei
- Spouse: Jahrah Mohamad
- Education: Sultan Omar Ali Saifuddien College
- Alma mater: University of Malaya (BA); Lancaster University (MA)
- Occupation: Civil servant; politician

Abu Bakar bin Haji Apong (born 19 September 1948) is a Bruneian aristocrat, civil servant, and politician who previously held several key ministerial positions. He served as minister of health from 1998 to 2005, minister of communications from 2005 to 2010, minister of education from 2010 to 2015, and minister of home affairs from 2015 to 2022. He had one of the longest tenures in government, serving for the second-longest period in Brunei.

Abu Bakar played an important role in the development of higher education in Brunei, particularly as one of the founding members of Universiti Brunei Darussalam (UBD). He pushed for the production of the university's first doctoral graduates and made key changes. (Note: A key change was the replacement of the Mushaf Al-Quran with the Cokmar at the university.) As Minister of Education (MoE), he supported initiatives like leadership programs and Brunei's participation in the Programme for International Student Assessment (PISA) to improve student performance. Abu Bakar also highlighted the importance of parental involvement in education and the ongoing improvements to the education system.

== Early life and education ==
Abu Bakar was born on 19 September 1948 in Kampong Setia Pahlawan of Kampong Ayer His early education began at Lela Menchanai Malay School from 1955 to 1957, followed by Sultan Muhammad Jamalul Alam Malay School in the same year. He then attended Sultan Omar Ali Saifuddien College from 1958 to 1968, graduating in 1964 alongside then-Prince Hassanal Bolkiah, Eusoff Agaki Ismail, and Goh King Chin.

Abu Bakar graduated with a Bachelor of Arts (Hons) from the University of Malaya in Malaysia in 1972. That same year, he began his career as an education officer. In 1974, he furthered his studies by earning a Diploma of Education from the National Institute of Education in Singapore. He then joined Paduka Seri Begawan Sultan Malay College, initially as a teaching staff member, before being appointed principal in 1974. From 1975 to 1979, he served as the secretary of the Brunei Education Council. In 1980, he completed his Master of Arts at Lancaster University.

== Political career ==
=== Early career ===
Upon returning from the United Kingdom, Abu Bakar served as the head of the Planning, Research, and Guidance Unit in the Department of Education from 1975 to 1980. He then moved to the Personnel Office, where he became the head of the Training Unit from 1980 to 1981. Between 1981 and 1984, he worked as a senior administrative officer in the General Counsel Department under the sultan. In 1984, he was appointed director of studies. Additionally, Abu Bakar held the position of deputy vice-chancellor at UBD from 1985 to 1986.

Abu Bakar was appointed permanent secretary of the Prime Minister's Office, where he served from 1986 to 1991. During this period, he also chaired the Council of Asian Pacific Development Center in Kuala Lumpur from 1987 to 1988. He then took on the role of vice-chancellor at UBD, holding this position from 1991 to 1999. His contributions extended to Brunei's energy sector, where, as a director on the board of Brunei Shell Companies, he reported that the country's crude oil output for 1991 was expected to exceed the conservation target, reaching an estimated 163,000 barrels per day—well above the planned 150,000 barrels per day. Additionally, he highlighted that Brunei's crude oil exports to ASEAN would account for 34% of total sales, marking a 2% increase from the previous year. In an October 1991 meeting of the ASEAN Council on Petroleum, Abu Bakar forecasted that upcoming exploration activities could lead to significant discoveries of new oil and gas reserves.

In October 1992, Abu Bakar became the managing director of YSHHB. That same year, he was appointed secretary of Brunei Research Councils, serving until 1999. He also held a position as a board member of the Borneo Research Council (BRC) from 1994 to 1999. In June 1996, at the BRC's fourth biennial conference, Abu Bakar stressed the importance of preserving oral traditions and traditional knowledge. He highlighted the close connection between biodiversity conservation and the protection of indigenous people's cultural practices, particularly those dependent on the environment. Between December 1996 and November 1998, he served as president of the Association of Southeast Asian Institutions of Higher Learning.

His career continued to progress as he was promoted to permanent secretary (professional) at MoE, where he served from 1999 until May 2002. At the same time, he was the chief executive officer of the Mahkota Al-Muhtadee Billah Young Investment Fund in May 1999, and chairman and managing director of Islamic Bank of Brunei and its subsidiaries in July 2001.

=== Minister of Health ===
Abu Bakar's ministerial career began when he was named minister of health on 17 May 2002, one of two new cabinet members, along with Ahmad Jumat, who was named development minister. This change was made in the midst of criticism of the cabinet's long-standing stability, with some doubting its capacity to handle the difficulties associated with economic diversification and guide the nation into the new millennium. Abu Bakar spoke against stigma and prejudice during the World AIDS Campaign, which focused on the theme "Stigma and Discrimination: Live and Let Live" from 2002 to 2003.

On 7 July 2003, during the 2002–2004 SARS outbreak, Abu Bakar announced that the Quarantine and Disease Prevention Act of 1984 would be replaced by the Infectious Diseases Order 2003, developed to better control and prevent infectious diseases such as HIV/AIDS, Ebola, Plague, yellow fever, and SARS. As the acting minister of culture, youth and sports, he also presided over the handover of the national flag for Brunei's athletes competing in the 2nd ASEAN Para Games in Hanoi on 17 December 2003. In June 2004, Abu Bakar launched the "Danger of Smoking and 30 Days Without Smoking" awareness campaign, aimed at raising awareness of the risks of smoking and promoting coordinated efforts to tackle tobacco use in Brunei.

=== Minister of Communications ===
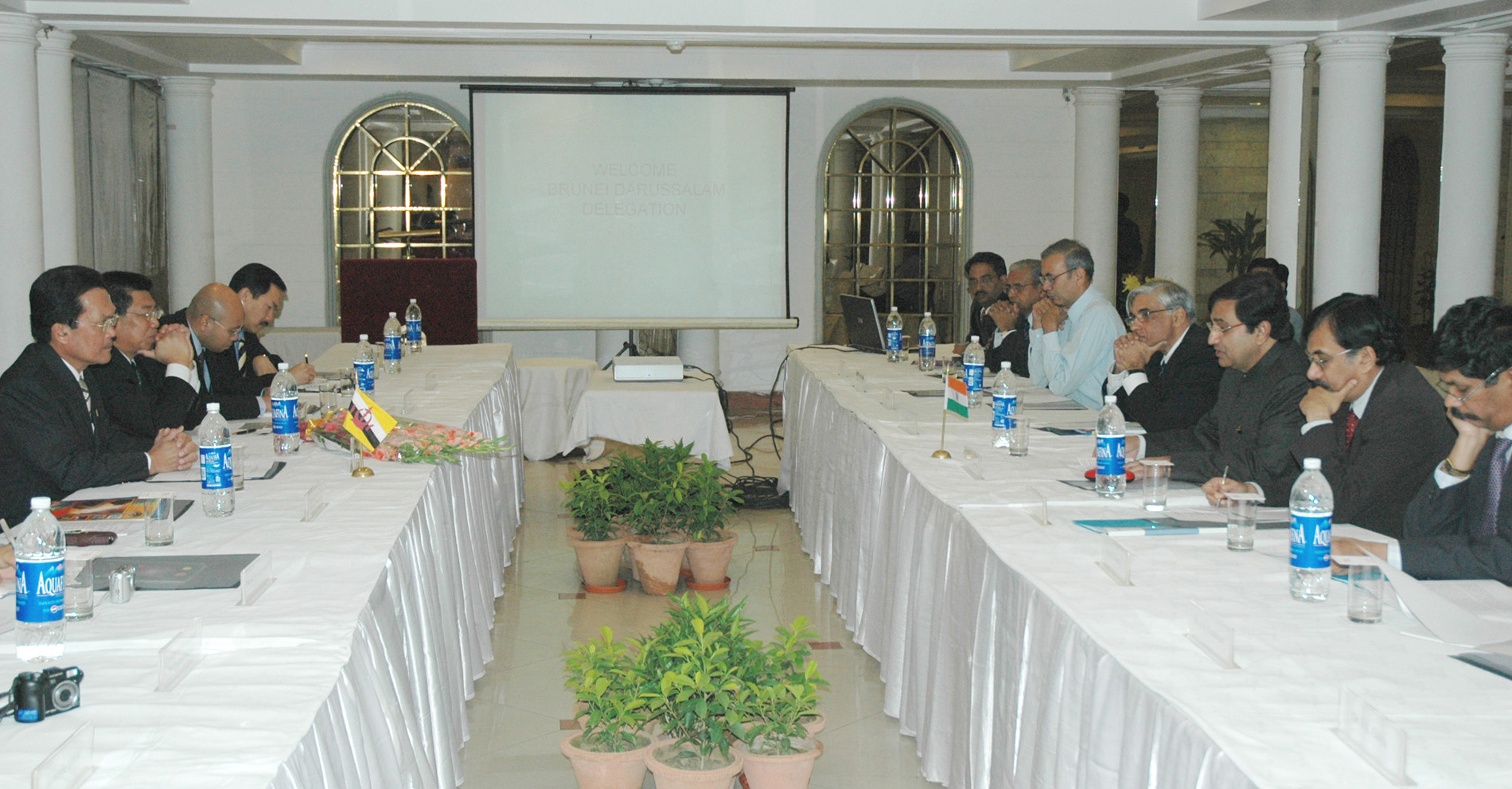
Meeting between Abu Bakar (left) and Shakeel Ahmad (right) in 2006

Abu Bakar was appointed minister of communications in the 2005 Bruneian cabinet reshuffle on 24 May, succeeding Zakaria Sulaiman. On 1 April 2006, he announced the creation of the Authority for Info-communications Technology Industry, an independent regulator overseeing ICT policies, spectrum management, and licensing, at the corporatisation of Brunei Telecom Department into Telekom Brunei. In September, he chaired the TELMIN+1 Sessions with ASEAN Dialogue Partners. On 25 November, Abu Bakar inaugurated the new B$2 million Kuala Belait Port office building, designed to centralise port services and improve maritime monitoring in the Belait River area.

On 16 January 2007, Abu Bakar officially opened the 32nd ASEAN Ports Association (APA) meeting in Gadong, emphasising the importance of innovation, cooperation, and efficient port operations to tackle industry challenges and boost global competitiveness. He commended APA's initiatives in management, human resource development, and security, particularly in adhering to the ISPS Code. On 22 February 2007, Abu Bakar launched Customer Day at the YSHHB Complex, urging the Brunei Postal Services Department to modernise and focus on customer-centric services. He also introduced 12 new permanent stamps to emphasise innovation and quality service.

In January 2010, Abu Bakar spoke at the International Telecommunication Union's Regional Human Capacity Development Forum, highlighting Brunei's goal to become a knowledge-based economy by 2035. He emphasised capacity-building, ICT certifications, integrating ICT into education, and the need for mindset shifts to meet evolving demands. On 7 January, he presided over the opening of the Bangar Boat and Passenger Terminal in Temburong District, later touring the facility, which aims to enhance Brunei's economic growth and improve connectivity for both locals and visitors. On 18 January, during a farewell meeting with the Swedish ambassador, Abu Bakar discussed the need for new initiatives in Brunei–Sweden relations, particularly in ICT, highlighting growing collaboration, especially with major firms like Ericsson and Saab AB.

=== Minister of Education ===
Abu Bakar was appointed minister of education during the 2010 Bruneian cabinet reshuffle on 29 May, and took office on 9 June for a five-year term. On 26 September, he highlighted the role of teachers in improving education, referencing global best practices and Brunei's School Leadership Program (SLP). He also praised educators for their innovative strategies and discussed literacy, numeracy, and the upcoming PISA assessment. On 2 November, he encouraged school leaders to embrace creativity and praised initiatives aimed at developing self-sufficient principals and improving both academic and non-academic outcomes.

On 6 April 2011, Abu Bakar marked the 40th anniversary of Jefri Bolkiah College of Engineering with a groundbreaking ceremony for its B$8 million expansion, aimed at enhancing engineering and marine facilities. On 25 July, he emphasised the importance of digital skills, civic responsibility, and teamwork in education to help students thrive in a globalised world. On 19 October, he updated the Legislative Council (LegCo) on the National Education System for the 21st Century (SPN21) and education initiatives, including the Building Improvement of Schools project. On 12 November, he revealed plans for a new secondary school in Temburong and discussed infrastructure upgrades at Sultan Hassan Secondary School.

On 15 February 2012, Abu Bakar highlighted educational programs designed to improve student proficiency, including the home connection program, literacy and numeracy interventions, and phonics-based English and Malay. He emphasised the importance of continuous monitoring, assessment, and adaptation of these initiatives, with active involvement from parents, educators, and the community, as part of MoE's broader efforts to implement SPN21. On 14 March, Abu Bakar discussed the challenges of securing suitable land for a school in Kampong Mumong due to the presence of peat soil, explaining the cost implications of replacing it, and outlined the ministry's efforts to address teacher shortages by hiring over 170 graduates, while stressing the importance of the education system and the need for better recruitment practices.

Earlier in the year, Abu Bakar became the 33rd Lee Kuan Yew Exchange Fellow, visiting Singapore from 1 to 9 April 2012 as the third Bruneian recipient, accompanied by his wife and members of MoE. On 17 April, he delivered a talk on "Melayu Islam Beraja (MIB) in Education," highlighting the importance of the nation's philosophy as the people's identity and its integration into education. The talk aimed to help around 400 students from various faculties understand, apply, and assess the MIB concept in their daily lives. Later, Abu Bakar participated in the fifth APEC Education Ministers Meeting and conducted a working visit to South Korea from 21 to 23 May 2012.

On 20 August 2013, Abu Bakar welcomed Singapore's minister of education, Heng Swee Keat, and they discussed enhancing educational cooperation between Brunei and Singapore, focusing on higher education, early childhood education, and teaching methods, while reviewing the outcomes of joint initiatives since 2006.

On 16 March 2014, Abu Bakar held a bilateral meeting with Timor Leste's minister of education, Bendito Freitas, at The Empire Hotel & Country Club in Jerudong. On 18 March, Abu Bakar clarified that the Department of Schools' new initiatives aimed to improve education quality without overburdening teachers. He discussed the School Leadership Programme, efforts to standardise academic promotion criteria, and the Brunei Darussalam Qualification Framework, aligning qualifications with international standards. He also outlined plans for the Brunei Entrepreneurship Development Programme, including an "Entrepreneurship Village," and stressed that MoE sets the guidelines for student allocation to schools.

=== Minister of Home Affairs ===
On 22 October 2015, Abu Bakar was appointed minister of home affairs, succeeding Badaruddin Othman in a wider cabinet reshuffle that saw several senior officials reassigned. During the 2015/2016 budget discussions, Abu Bakar expressed concern over the country’s financial difficulties, warning that if low oil prices persisted, the current B$1.6 billion deficit could become even more challenging than the 1997 Asian financial crisis and the 2008 financial crisis. Despite these challenges, he highlighted the importance of public and government collaboration in achieving Wawasan Brunei 2035. He also recognised the need for careful evaluation of proposed initiatives, given the economic deficit, and called for unity to move the country forward.

On 10 March 2016, Abu Bakar emphasised initiatives to enhance the business environment, including repealing the Business License Act for seven activities, promoting worker welfare, and strengthening local economies through programmes like 'Ease of Doing Business' and 'One Village, One Product' (1K1P). These efforts resulted in a 43% increase in registrations in early 2016, despite a drop in government revenue from business licenses.

On 11 March 2017, Abu Bakar announced budget increases for licensing and enforcement in Bandar Seri Begawan and Tutong to enhance efficiency, public cleanliness, and business compliance. Later, on 20 March, he proposed 31 directives for the 2017–2018 budget, approved by Sultan Hassanal Bolkiah, including a $1 billion Development Fund allocation.

Abu Bakar retained his position in the 2018 Bruneian cabinet reshuffle, which replaced six ministers. On 9 March 2018, he highlighted ministry efforts to boost socio-economic growth through tourism, halal certification, and agricultural expertise, along with business-friendly reforms like reducing Foreign Worker License processing times. On 20 March, during the 14th LegCo Session, he proposed two resolutions: approving 34 orders, including the Supply Act 2018/2019, and allocating $900 million from the Development Fund for development goals, both of which passed unanimously.

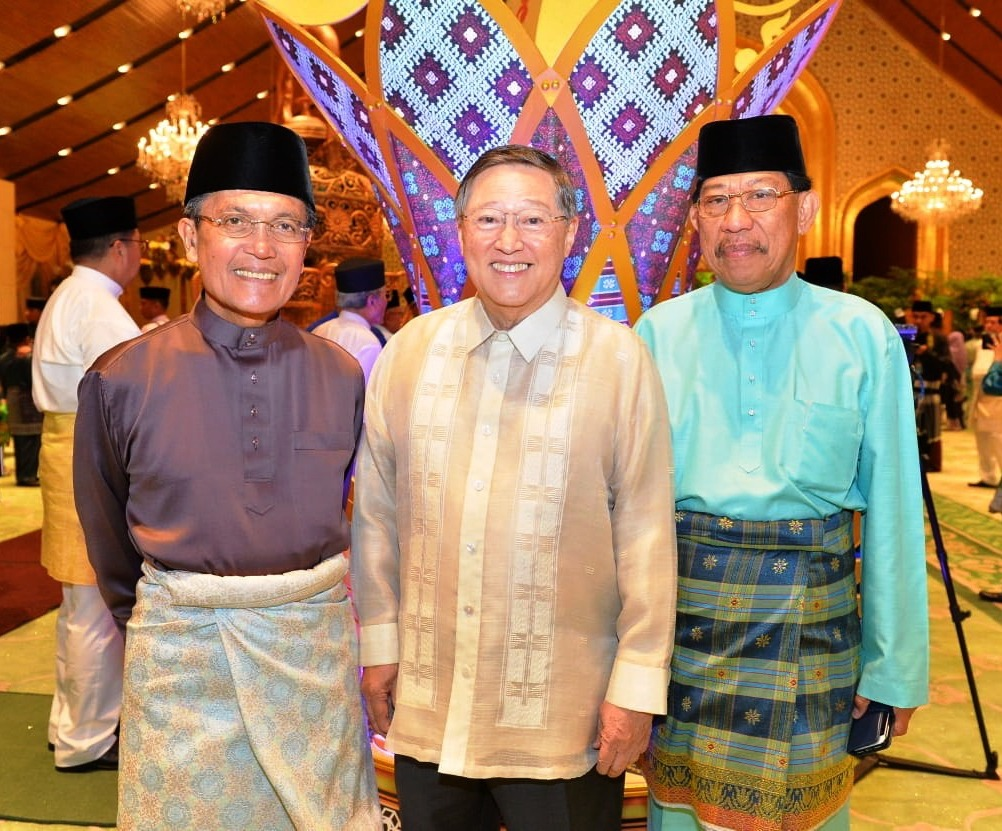
Abu Bakar, Carlos Domínguez III and Nor Jeludin at the Istana Nurul Iman in 2019

On 4 May 2019, Abu Bakar commended the Fire and Rescue Department for saving $20.79 million in 2018, introduced the "Life Saver 995" campaign, emphasised the importance of fire safety awareness, and cautioned against hydrant vandalism under the 2016 Fire Safety Order. Earlier, on 20 April, he outlined the 2019–2020 Temburong budget, focusing on community leadership, socio-economic growth, and public well-being, while spotlighting initiatives such as "1K1K," "1K1P," and Anugerah Kampung Cemerlang, all aligned with Wawasan Brunei 2035.

On 14 March 2020, Abu Bakar emphasised the need for a "Whole of Nation Approach" to address issues like unemployment and economic development, requiring cooperation from both government and non-government sectors. He stressed the importance of achieving Wawasan Brunei 2035 for a prosperous future and urged Bruneians to follow health guidelines and take social responsibility in combating COVID-19 for their safety. To stop the spread of COVID-19 in Brunei, Abu Bakar declared on 23 March, that foreigners would not be allowed to enter Brunei until 24 March. Applications for visit, student, and dependent visas were also suspended, and "Visa on Arrival" was stopped. Additionally, he stated that applications for urgent situations should be sent to the Immigration Department for special attention.

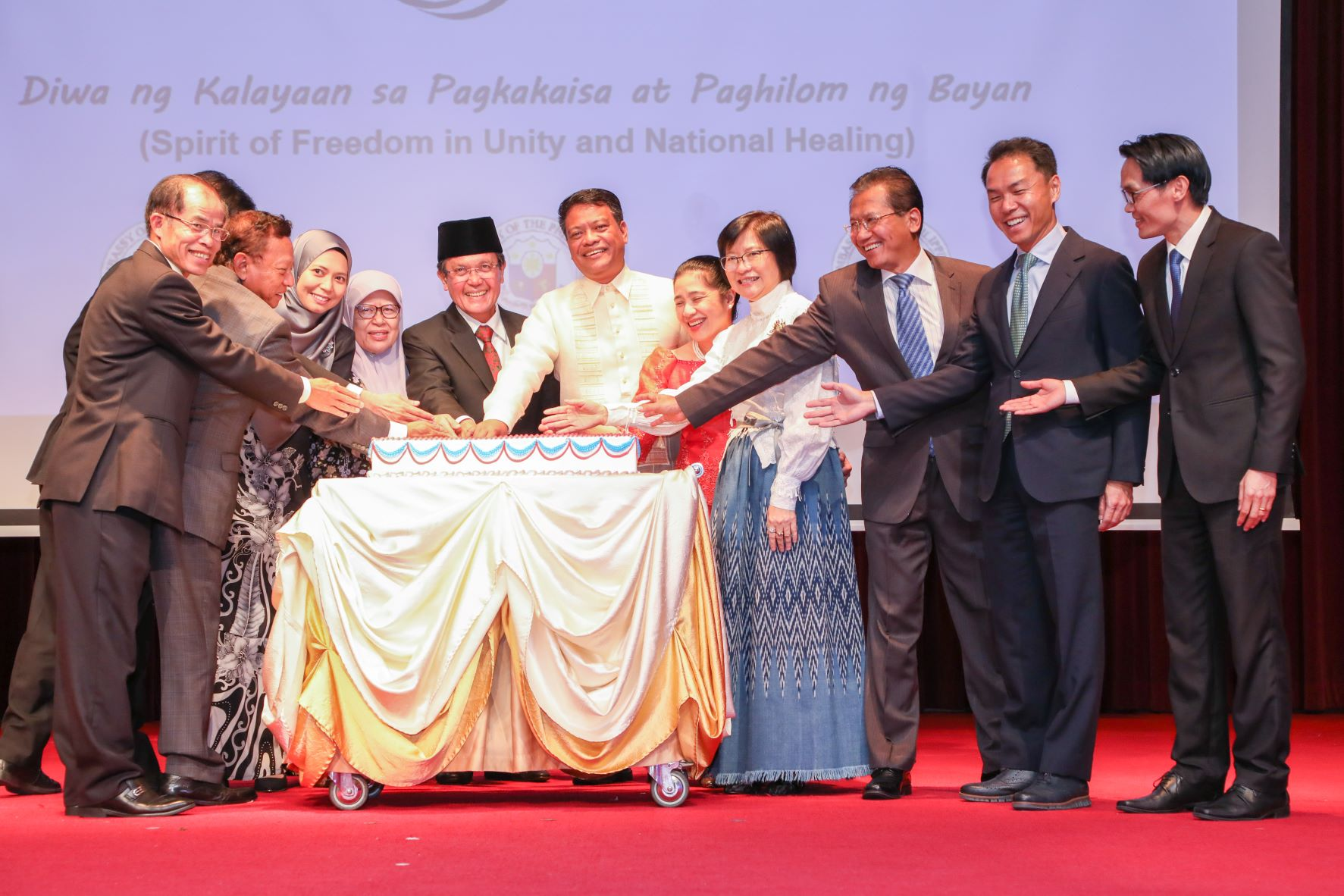
Abu Bakar (fifth from the left) at the 2021 Philippines independence day celebration in Gadong

During the 17th Session of LegCo on 25 March 2021, Abu Bakar proposed the first motion to approve 17 orders, and the sultan gave his permission. These directives were to take effect as soon as they were approved. Abu Bakar also put out the second resolution, which calls for the Development Fund to contribute $600 million to the 2021–2022 Development Budget. Abu Bakar oversaw initiatives such as the Manpower Planning and Employment Council, which successfully employed 12,763 jobseekers by 2020, quadrupling local employment figures. At the 27 November 2021 virtual ASEAN Ministerial Meeting on Disaster Management, Abu Bakar highlighted the importance of regional cooperation in disaster management. He discussed Brunei's Community-Based Disaster Risk Management program and initiatives to engage youth in disaster risk reduction and climate change adaptation. The meeting also approved the AADMER Work Program for 2021–2025 and launched the ASEAN-ESCAP Joint Study on Drought.d.

Abu Bakar addressed public health measures during the second wave of the COVID-19 pandemic, reporting on vaccination progress and enforcing regulations such as mandatory dog registration by 1 February 2022, with penalties for noncompliance. On 7 June 2022, he was replaced by Ahmaddin Abdul Rahman in a cabinet reshuffle. Throughout his tenure, he served in the government for the second-longest period, following Isa bin Ibrahim.

== Later life ==
Following the end of his ministerial career, he became a patron of the Suri Seri Begawan Raja Pengiran Anak Damit Mosque in the Kampong Manggis and Madang area.

== Personal life ==
Abu Bakar is married to Datin Paduka Hajah Jahrah binti Haji Mohammad.

== Titles, styles and honours ==
=== Titles and styles ===
On 25 May 1996, Abu Bakar was honoured by Sultan Hassanal Bolkiah with the manteri title of Pehin Orang Kaya Putera Maharaja. He was later elevated to the title of Pehin Orang Kaya Seri Kerna on 1 April 2004. Each of these titles carries the style Yang Dimuliakan.

=== Awards ===
- Anugerah Pendidikan Sultan Haji Omar 'Ali Saifuddien (2017)

=== Honours ===
Abu Bakar has been bestowed the following honours:

National

- Order of Setia Negara Brunei First Class (PSNB; 15 July 2002) – Dato Seri Setia
- Order of Paduka Seri Laila Jasa Second Class (DSLJ; 1989) – Dato Seri Laila Jasa
- Order of Seri Paduka Mahkota Brunei Third Class (SMB; 1982)
- Sultan Hassanal Bolkiah Medal (PHBS; 15 July 2006)
- Excellent Service Medal (PIKB; 1987)
- Long Service Medal (PKL; 1996)
- Sultan of Brunei Silver Jubilee Medal Gold Class (5 October 1992)
- National Day Silver Jubilee Medal (23 February 2009)
- Honorary Doctorate of Letters from the UBD (2007)

Foreign

- Japan:
  - Highest Awards of Soka from the University of Japan (1984)
  - Honorary Doctorate of Soka from the University of Japan (1998)
- Malaysia:
  - Doctor of Education from the University of Malaya (1999)

== Notes ==
Political offices
Preceded by Badaruddin Othman	5th Minister of Home Affairs; 22 October 2015 – 7 June 2022	Succeeded by Ahmaddin Abdul Rahman
Preceded by Abdul Rahman Taib	3rd Minister of Education; 29 May 2010 – 22 October 2015	Succeeded by Suyoi Osman
Preceded by Zakaria Sulaiman	4th Minister of Communications; 24 May 2005 – 28 May 2010	Succeeded by Abdullah Bakar
Preceded by Abdul Aziz Umar (Acting)	3rd Minister of Health; 25 March 1998 – 23 May 2005	Succeeded by Suyoi Osman
Academic offices
Preceded by Abdul Aziz Umar	Vice-Chancellor of Universiti Brunei Darussalam; 1991–1999	Succeeded by Mahmud Saedon
