= Kementerian Perhubungan =

Kementerian Perhubungan may refer to:

- Ministry of Communications (Brunei), a government ministry in Brunei
- Ministry of Transportation (Indonesia), a government ministry in Indonesia
