= Maritime and Port Authority Brunei Darussalam =

Government agency of Brunei

Coordinates: 5.0294477°N 115.0717689°E

- Pihak Berkuasa Maritim Dan Pelabuhan Brunei Darussalam

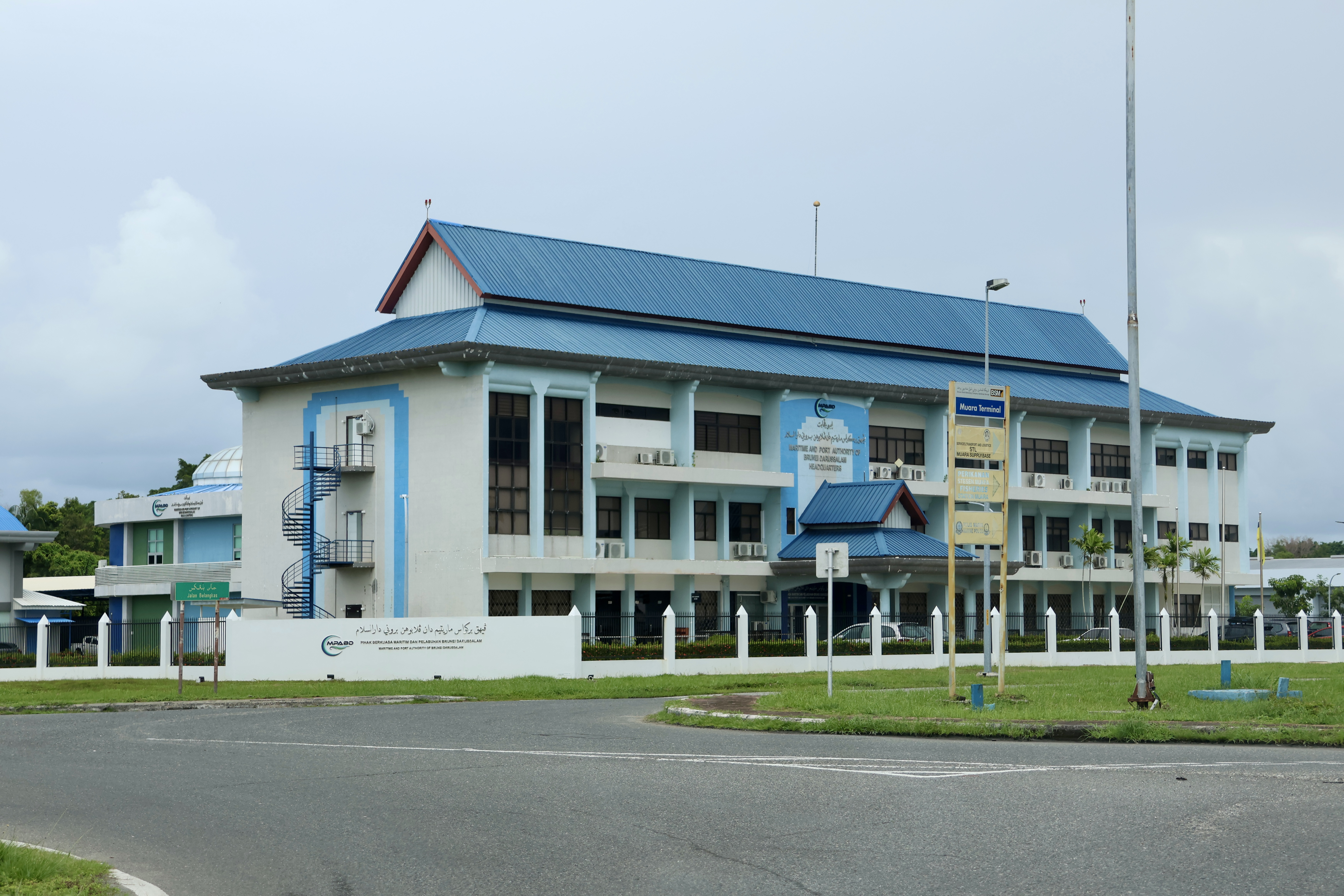
- Headquarters in Muara, Brunei

Agency overview
- Formed: September 2017; 8 years ago
- Jurisdiction: Government of Brunei
- Headquarters: Jalan Muara, Muara, Mukim Serasa, Brunei-Muara, Brunei BT1728
- Minister responsible: Shamhary Mustapha, Minister of Transport and Infocommunications
- Parent department: Ministry of Transport and Infocommunications
- Website: www.gov.bn/directories/MPA.aspx

The Maritime and Port Authority of Brunei Darussalam (Malay: Pihak Berkuasa Maritim Dan Pelabuhan Brunei Darussalam, MPABD) is a statutory board under the Ministry of Transport of the Government of Brunei. The agency was formed by Maritime and Port Authority of Brunei Darussalam Order, 2017.

== Role ==
As Port Authority, MPABD regulates and manages port and marine services, facilities and activities within the Brunei waters. This includes vessel traffic and navigational safety and security, through regulation on operational efficiency and on the environment.

As Developer and Promoter, MPABD works with other government agencies and maritime industry partners to make Brunei a leading global hub port and a top international maritime center. Its aims include attracting a core group of shipowners and operators to set up operations in Brunei, broadening the breadth and depth of maritime ancillary services offered here, and improving on the business environment for the maritime industry.

As the National Sea Transport Representative, the MPABD safeguards Brunei's maritime/port interests in the international arena. This extends to being the Government's Advisor on matters relating to sea transport, and maritime/port services and facilities.
