= Abdul Mutalib =

Bruneian politician

Dato Seri Setia Abdul Mutalib PSNB SMB PIKB
- عبدالمطلب
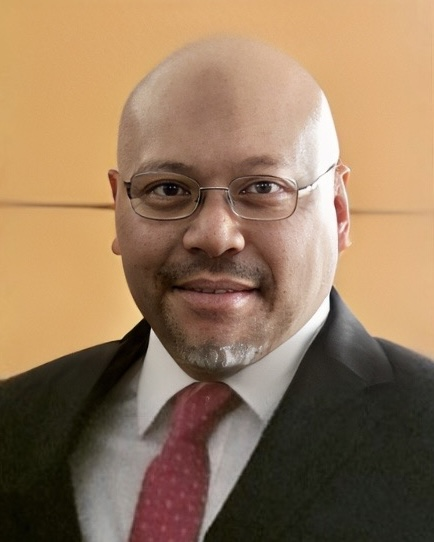
- Abdul Mutalib in 2019

7th Minister of Transport and Infocommunications
- In office 30 January 2018 – 7 June 2022
- Monarch: Hassanal Bolkiah
- Preceded by: Mustappa Sirat
- Succeeded by: Pengiran Shamhary

Personal details
- Born: 9 March 1971 (age 55) Bandar Seri Begawan, Brunei
- Spouse: Noor Ashikin
- Children: 7
- Education: University of Melbourne (MIB); Universiti Brunei Darussalam (BA)
- Occupation: Civil servant; politician

Dato Seri Setia Abdul Mutalib bin Pehin Orang Kaya Seri Setia Dato Paduka Haji Awang Mohammad Yusof (born 9 March 1971), also known as Abdul Mutalib Yusof, is a politician in the Government of Brunei. He took office as the Minister of Transport and Infocommunications from 2018 to 2022. Additionally, Sultan Hassanal Bolkiah gave his approval for his appointment as the Minister in Charge of Cybersecurity on 17 October 2018.

== Early life and education ==
Dato Seri Setia Abdul Mutalib bin Pehin Orang Kaya Seri Setia Dato Paduka Haji Awang Mohammad Yusof was born in Bandar Seri Begawan on 9 March 1971, and attended Paduka Seri Begawan Sultan Science College and St. Andrew's School for his early schooling. He holds degrees from the University of Melbourne in Master of International Business (Economics) and Diploma in Microeconomic Strategy, as well as a Bachelor of Arts (Management Studies) from Universiti Brunei Darussalam (UBD).

Abdul Mutalib is a member of the Australian Institute of Management (AIMM, Australia). He had also taken short courses through fellowships at institutions like the Civil Service College in Singapore, the Harvard Kennedy School of Government in the United States, and the "21st Century Partnership Invitation Leadership Program" in Japan.

== Early career ==
In 1995, Abdul Mutalib began working for Brunei's Telecommunications Department as a marketing officer. Later, he was appointed resource officer at the Ministry of Industry and Primary Resources. He relocated to the Ministry of Communications in 1999, where he worked as a special responsibilities officer from 2001 to 2002 and as a marketing officer from 1999 to 2001. He was appointed assistant chief executive in January 2003 by the Authority for Info-communications Technology Industry of Brunei (AITI), initially for policy and regulatory matters and then for industry and policy. After that, in March 2007, he was transferred to the Prime Minister's Office (PMO), where he took on the role of acting senior special duties officer. From April to August 2008, he also served as the PMO's acting director of planning, e-Government, and media.

Abdul Mutalib later had a number of positions, consisting of deputy permanent secretary at the Ministry of Communications from 2008 to 2013, permanent secretary at the Ministry of Communications from April 2013 to November 2015, permanent secretary at the Media and Cabinet in the PMO from November 2015 to August 2016, and permanent secretary at the Ministry of Home Affairs from August 2016 to January 2018. During a cabinet reshuffle on 30 January 2018, Sultan Hassanal Bolkiah revealed the changes in a televised speech, which resulted in his appointment as Minister of Transport and Infocommunications.

== Ministerial career ==
Amin Liew Abdullah and Abdul Mutalib declared in a joint statement on 25 February 2019, that a significant transition has started in the information and communications technology (ICT) sector to speed up the country's digital agenda. The network infrastructure of all current telecommunications providers will be merged under this proposal to develop a new wholesale network provider named Unified National Networks (UNN). All existing companies will concentrate on retail operations, provide clients fixed mobile services, and have equitable access to UNN's network infrastructure. To build an environment that supports Brunei's long-term digital transformation and the objectives of Wawasan Brunei 2035, the growth of the ICT industry is essential.

During the 2nd United Nations Global Sustainable Transport Conference on 15 October 2021, he stated that the gradual improvement of road safety and the reorganization of the present national public transportation system are essential elements of their goals for sustainable transportation. Due to their ease, private motor vehicles make up a significant share of the traffic on Brunei's highways. Additionally, they want to investigate how technologies like computer vision and artificial intelligence (AI) may be used to administer a smart city through the Council for Research and Advancement in Technology and Science (CREATES). Among other things, this would allow them to gain a deeper understanding of new trends and patterns that are a significant contribution to the creation of our country's transportation regulations.

The Memorandum of understanding (MoU) on E-government between South Korea and Brunei was signed on 24 November 2019 in the Blue House, by Chin Young and Abdul Mutalib, and it will take effect on 18 December of the same year. The Singapore Ministry of Communications and Information hosted the signing of a MoU between the governments of Singapore and Brunei on 30 May 2022. Singapore's Minister for Communications and Information Josephine Teo signed on behalf of Singapore.

On 14 December 2021, Abdul Mutalib electronically attended the ASEAN-China Ministerial Meeting on Science, Technology, and Innovation. World Meteorological Day is observed by Brunei together with other WMO members, according to Abdul Mutalib. The importance of hydrometeorological and climatological information for disaster risk reduction, he added, is highlighted by this year's WMO theme of "Early Warning and Early Action." It was announced on 7 June 2022, that he would be replaced by Shamhary Mustapha in the new cabinet reshuffle.

== Personal life ==
Abdul Mutalib is married to Noor Ashikin binti Pehin Orang Kaya Seri Sura Pahlawan Dato Paduka Haji Mohammad Tahir, and together they have seven children. He likes going on family vacations, reading, cycling, watching football, and brisk walking.

== Honours ==
Abdul Mutalib is awarded the following honours:

- Order of Setia Negara Brunei First Class (PSNB; 14 July 2018) – Dato Seri Setia
- Order of Seri Paduka Mahkota Brunei Third Class (SMB; 2011)
- Excellent Service Medal (PIKB; 2007)

Political offices
Preceded by Mustappa Sirat	7th Minister of Transport and Infocommunications; 30 January 2018 – 7 June 2022	Succeeded by Pengiran Shamhary
