= Mustappa bin Sirat =

Bruneian politician (born 1957)

Dato Seri Setia Mustappa bin Sirat PSNB DPMB PJK PIKB
- موستڤڤا بن سيرت
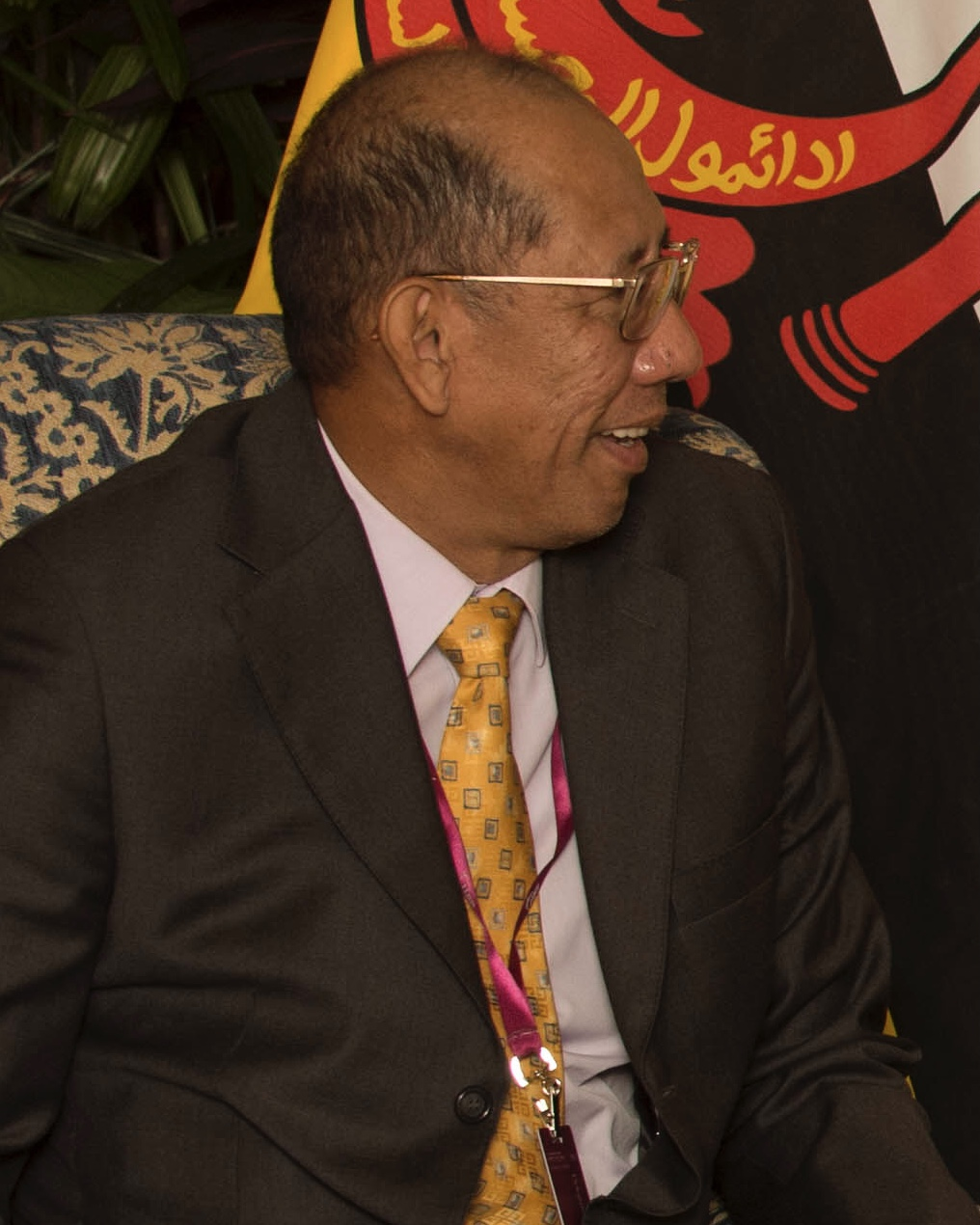
- Mustappa in 2013

6th Minister of Communications
- In office 22 October 2015 – 29 January 2018
- Monarch: Hassanal Bolkiah
- Preceded by: Abdullah Bakar
- Succeeded by: Abdul Mutalib

3rd Deputy Minister of Defence
- In office 29 May 2010 – 22 October 2015
- Minister: Hassanal Bolkiah
- Preceded by: Yasmin Umar
- Succeeded by: Abdul Aziz Tamit
Diplomatic positions
Brunei High Commissioner to Pakistan
In office
18 March 2003 – 4 November 2004

Personal details
- Born: 4 October 1957 (age 68) Seria, Belait, Brunei
- Spouse: Jamilah Mohd Yussof
- Children: 1
- Education: (BA)
- Profession: Politician; diplomat

Mustappa bin Haji Sirat (born 4 October 1957) is a diplomat and politician in the Government of Brunei. He took office as the Minister of Communications from 2015 to 2018 and also as the Deputy Minister of Defence.

== Early life ==
Mustappa Sirat is born in Seria, Belait, Brunei on 4 October 1957. His career began as an English teacher in Berakas English School prior to working with the government.

== Political career ==
In November 1982, Mustappa started working in the Ministry of Foreign Affairs as the director general in the Association of Southeast Asian Nations (ASEAN)–Brunei division and later the Policy Planning Department. In 1985, he became Brunei's second secretary to the United Kingdom, and later posted to Paris, France and Geneva, Switzerland. Moreover, he was the high commissioner to Pakistan from 18 March 2003 to 4 November 2004. Once returning to Brunei, Mustappa was reappointed as the Deputy Permanent Secretary, and Permanent Secretary in the Ministry of Defence (MINDEF) in June 2005. Posted to the Prime Minister's Office (PMO) as their Permanent Secretary on 12 October 2007.

In the 2010 Bruneian cabinet reshuffle on 29 May, Mustappa was appointed deputy minister of defence. Later that year, from 26 to 28 September, he visited Singapore and discussed with Teo Chee Hean, ways to strengthen relationships between Brunei and Singapore. He met with Ashton B. Carter to discuss future collaborations between the two nations in Washington, United States on 27 June 2013.

On 22 October 2015, an announcement was made by the Minister of Defence and Sultan of Brunei, Hassanal Bolkiah, about the new cabinet members of the 2015 reshuffle, He became the new minister in the Ministry of Communications. China ambassador to Brunei visited Mustappa and congratulated him on his newly appointed position, followed by discussions focusing on improving transportation and communication between the two nations on 18 November. After the 2018 Bruneian cabinet reshuffle on 30 January, Abdul Mutalib would succeed him in his position as the minister.

== Personal life ==
Dato Mustappa is married to Pengiran Hajah Jamilah binti Pengiran Haji Mohd Yussof and has one son together. He participated in the Fadhil Yunus & Adib Noor The BMW Golf Cup Brunei 2021 on 17 September 2022.

== Honours ==
- Order of Setia Negara Brunei First Class (PSNB) – Dato Seri Setia
- Order of Seri Paduka Mahkota Brunei Second Class (DPMB; 15 July 2006) – Dato Paduka
- Meritorious Service Medal (PJK)
- Excellent Service Medal (PIKB)
- Sultan of Brunei Silver Jubilee Medal (5 October 1992)
- National Day Silver Jubilee Medal (23 February 2009)

Political offices
Preceded by Abdullah Bakar	6th Minister of Communications; 22 October 2015 – 29 January 2018	Succeeded by Abdul Mutalib
Preceded by Yasmin Umar	3rd Deputy Minister of Defence; 29 May 2010 – 22 October 2015	Succeeded by Abdul Aziz Tamit
