= Paduka Seri Begawan Sultan Science College =

College in Serusop, Brunei

- Maktab Sains Paduka Seri Begawan Sultan

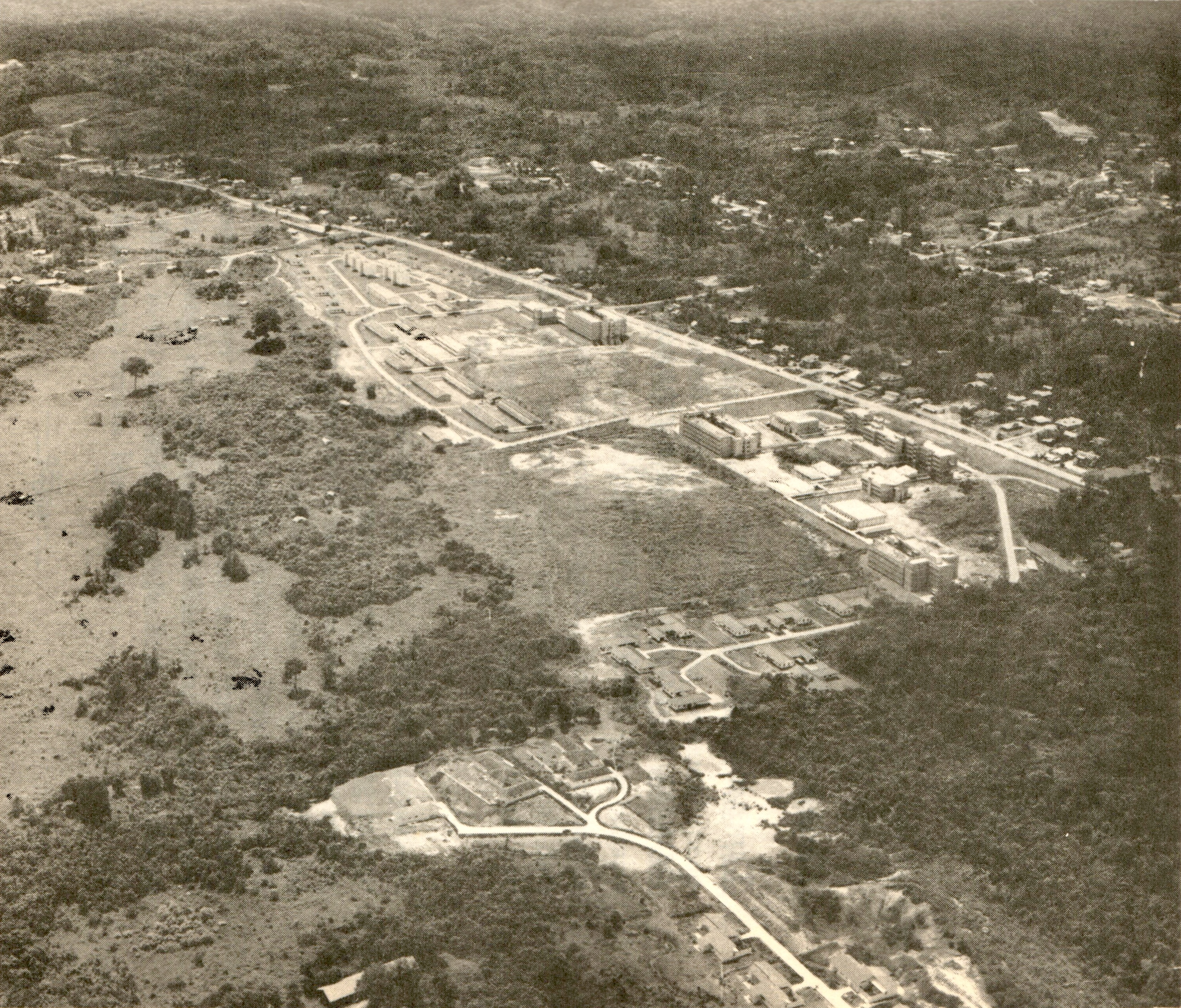
- The school under construction in c. 1966

Location
- Simpang 125, Jalan Muara; Bandar Seri Begawan, BB4713; Brunei
- Coordinates: 4°56′46″N 114°57′02″E

Information
- Former names: Paduka Seri Begawan Sultan Malay College (1971–1978); Paduka Seri Begawan Malay College/Science School (1978–1985)
- School type: Public sixth form
- Established: 23 September 1971
- School district: Cluster 3
- Authority: Ministry of Education
- Principal: Pengiran Hajah Rahmah Binti Pengiran Haji Abas
- Years offered: 7–13
- Gender: Coeducational
- Area: 35 acres (14 ha)
- Houses: 4
- Colour: Purple White
- Affiliation: CIE
- Website: Official Instagram

The Paduka Seri Begawan Sultan Science College (MSPSBS or Maktab Sains Paduka Seri Begawan Sultan), colloquially known as Maktab Sains (MS), is a government secondary school and sixth form college in Bandar Seri Begawan, Brunei. It is regarded as Brunei's top government-run secondary school; it admits only exceptional pupils and is well-known for its rigorous standards for both academic and extracurricular accomplishment.

== Namesake ==
Sultan Omar Ali Saifuddien III is honoured by the name of the university. Throughout the late Sultan's 17-year rule, Brunei saw substantial changes. The Melayu Islam Beraja philosophy, which serves as the nation's ruling ideology, was also created by him. In order to get his people ready for the state's sovereign rights to be restored, which his predecessor had initiated and sparked by the nationalist movement in Brunei at the end of World War II. He also started economic and social change. He took on the title of Duli Yang Teramat Mulia Paduka Seri Begawan Sultan upon his resignation on 4 October 1967.

== History ==
Following Sultan Omar Ali Saifuddien III's accession to the throne, Brunei's Malay primary school curriculum started to take shape. He has made it possible for locals to pursue more extensive education. Founded on 30 January 1966, the First Malay Secondary School (SMMP or Sekolah Menengah Melayu Pertama) (Note: It was also known as Jalan Muara Malay Secondary School.) was home to up to 900 pupils registered from all four districts. Its founding allowed pupils to pursue secondary education, the Malay primary school education began to take shape.

Following that, a maximum of 1,000 applicants from levels one, two, and three were permitted to take the Primary School Certificate (Sijil Rendah Pelajaran) examination. The first principal of the school was Dr. B. Simaudjuntak, who arrived from a neighbouring country; A. Sabtu bin Muhammad served as the deputy. There were forty-one instructors present at that time, four of them were from the Malaysian peninsula. Every Sunday, the school's students attended lectures by royal officials to gain valuable insights that would assist them in their future work. The council of Sultan Omar Ali Saifuddien College organised these lectures, with Menteri Besar Marsal Maun being the first to deliver one. On 2 July 1966, SMMP held its first Maulud of the Prophet Muhammad celebration outside the school, with Zain Serudin invited as the guest lecturer for the occasion.

The subjects offered at this school include science and arts, while home economics and carpentry were introduced in April 1971. It was formally established as the Paduka Seri Begawan Malay College (Maktab Melayu Paduka Seri Begawan) on 23 September 1971, by Sultan Omar Ali Saifuddien III. Initially, it had 1,000 students, including 350 students from sixth form, and 75 teaching staff. This school, built at a cost of about B$12.5 million on 35 acres (14 ha), can accommodate 500 students with residential facilities for both males and females, and features a library, science labs, home economics facilities, carpentry studios, and a hall. Malay and English-medium programs up to Form V were adopted in 1976. In 1978, Science School (Sekolah Sains) was added to its name.

In order to accommodate the sixth form in the English language, its status was upgraded to a college, and renamed to Paduka Seri Begawan Sultan Science College (Maktab Sains Paduka Seri Begawan Sultan) was adopted in 1985. As the number of students increased, the school was renovated to accommodate the growing student population. On 3 February 1994, the school was temporarily relocated to a new building in Kampong Rimba. After the renovations were completed on 2 April 2005, 11 years later, the school returned to its original premises. (Note: Despite the college's long-standing policy of not admitting outside students for its sixth form, this policy was altered in the beginning of 1995 when exceptional pupils from other Bruneian institutions were accepted.) Since 2007, Form I students have been scheduled for the afternoon session due to a shortage of classrooms. In 2008, Year 8 students were also scheduled for the afternoon session. The Year 7 students of 2008 were the first cohort to experience the SPN 21 initiative.

== School life ==
The four sporting houses of Maktab Sains are Pahlawan, Hulubalang, Panglima and Laksamana.

== Notable people ==
=== Notable staff ===
- Abu Bakar Apong

=== Notable alumni ===
- Abdul Mutalib
- Abu Bakar Apong
- Fakhrul Razi
- Goh King Chin
- Eusoff Agaki Ismail
- Prince Abdul Mateen
- Prince Abdul Qawi
- Prince Al-Muhtadee Billah
- Princess Sarah
- Princess Majeedah Nuurul
- Princess Hafizah Sururul
- Princess Azemah Ni'matul Bolkiah
- Sultan Hassanal Bolkiah
- Wafi Aminuddin
Notable Paduka Seri Begawan Sultan Science College Alumni

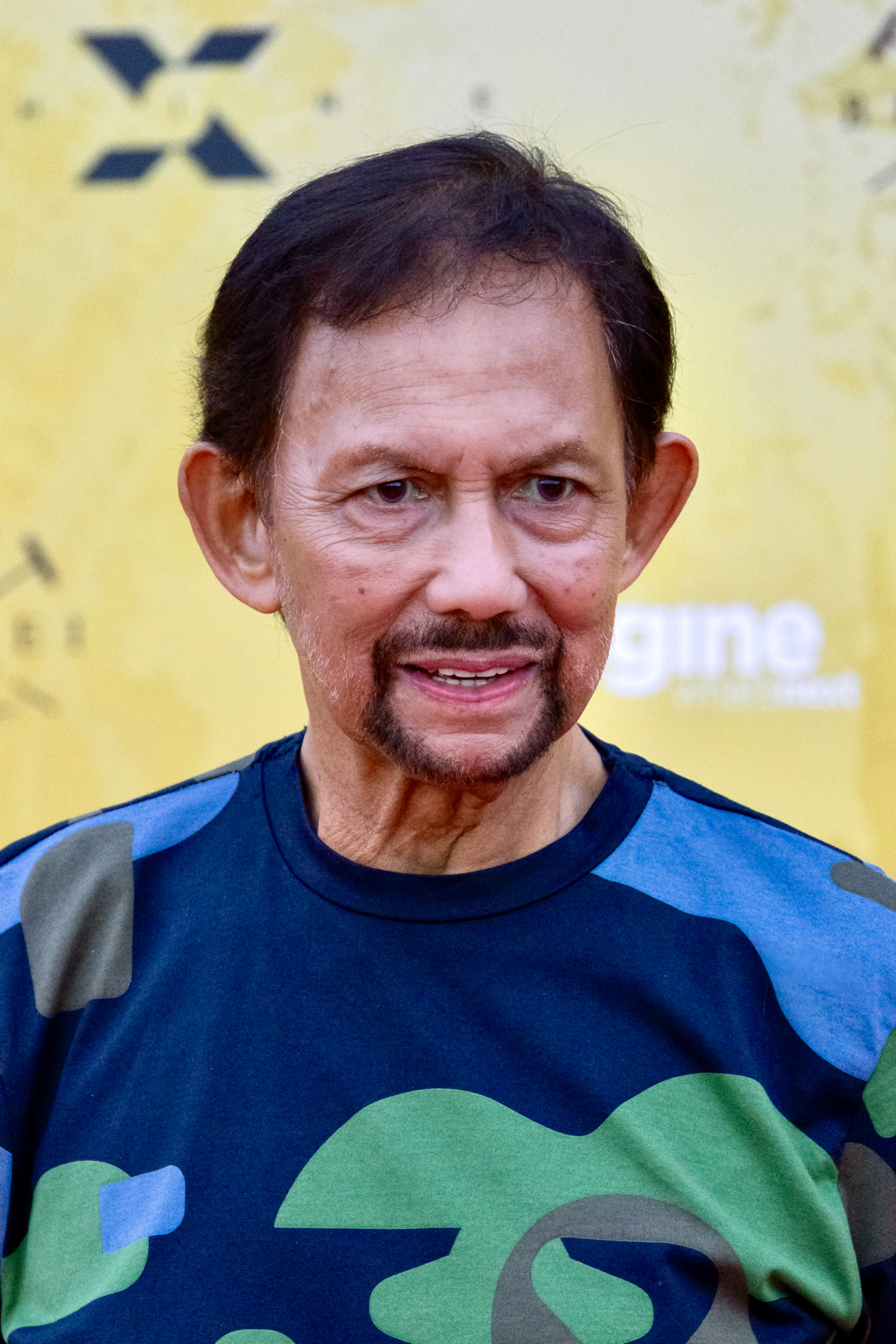
Hassanal Bolkiah, Sultan of Brunei

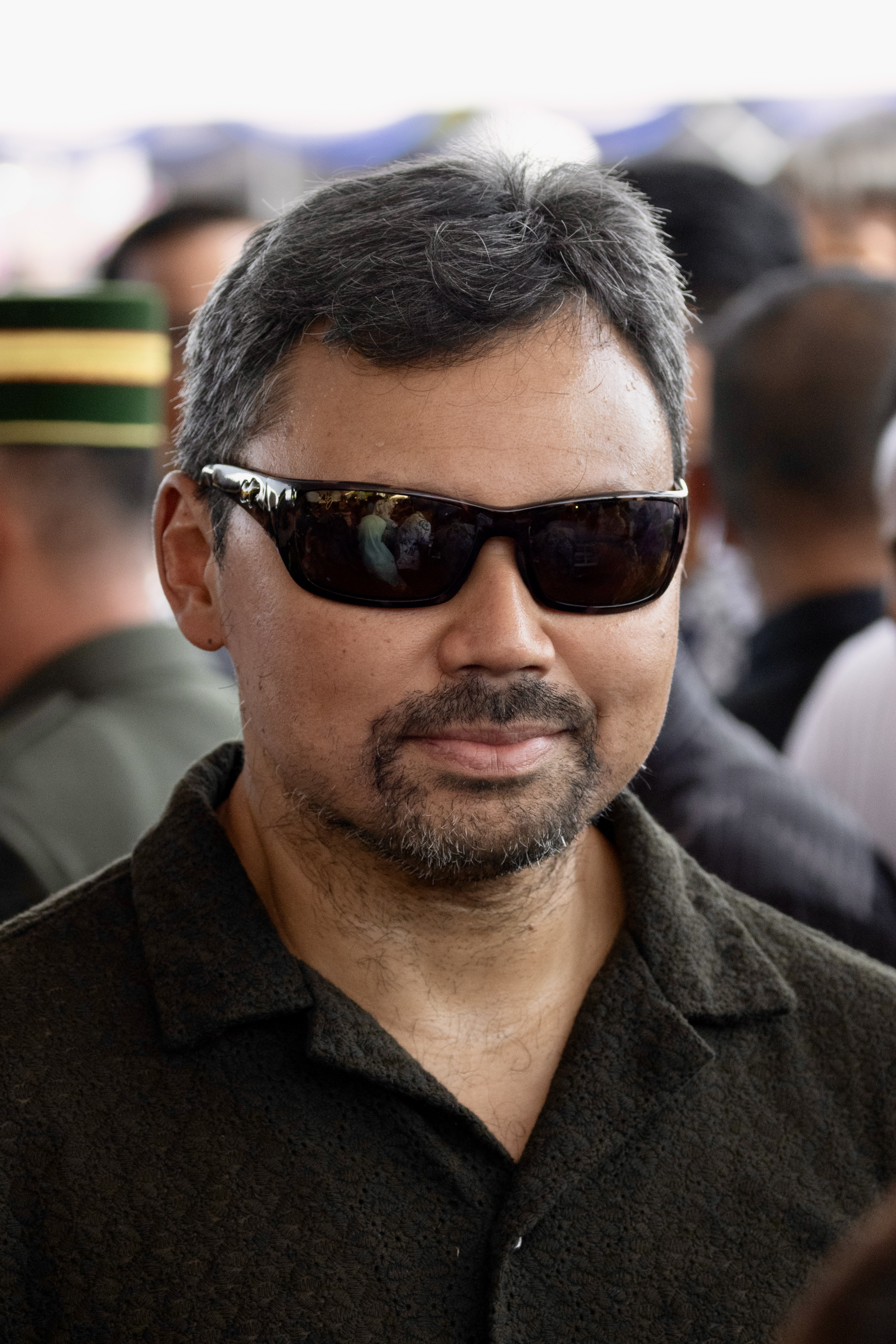
Al-Muhtadee Billah, Crown Prince of Brunei

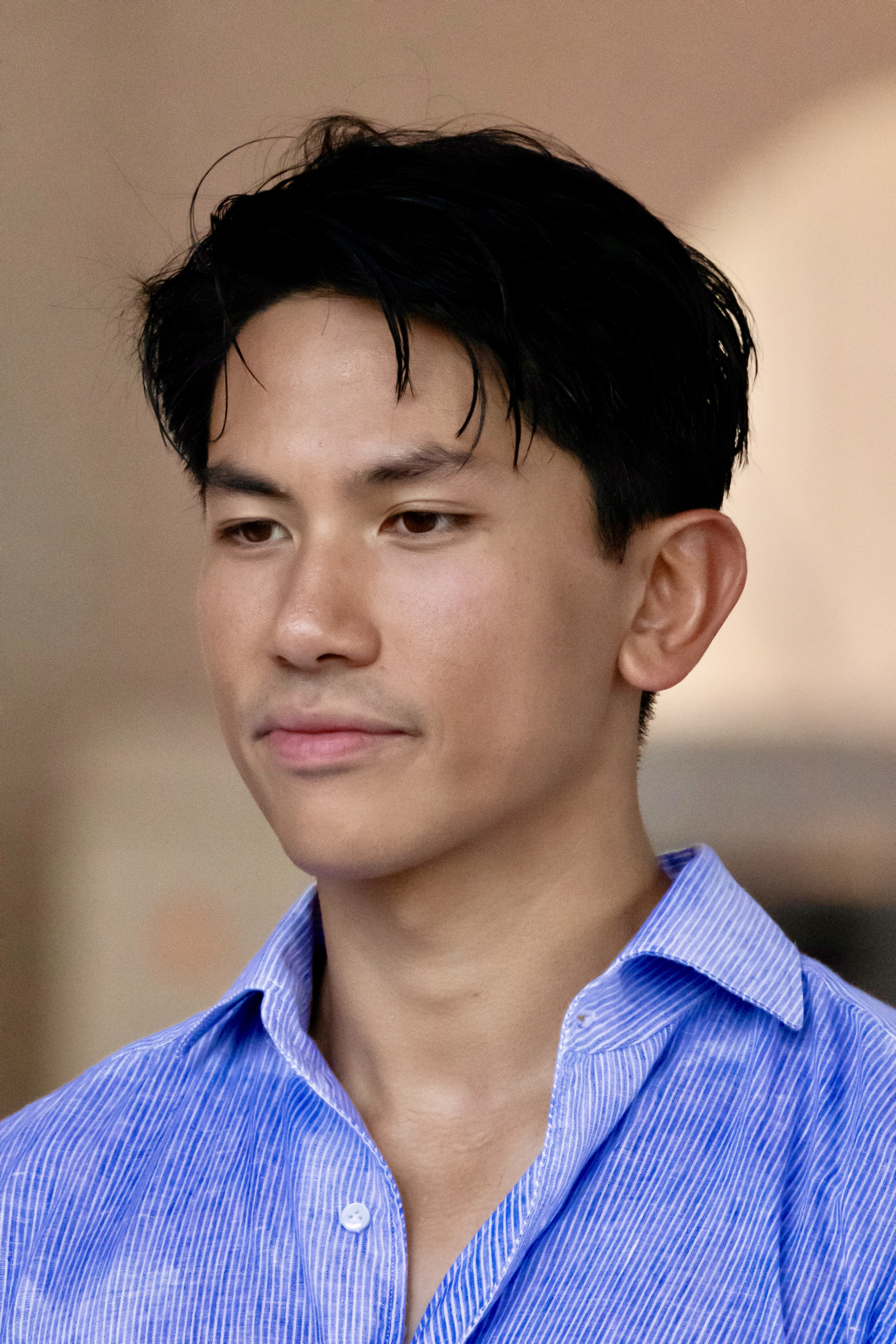
Abdul Mateen, Prince of Brunei

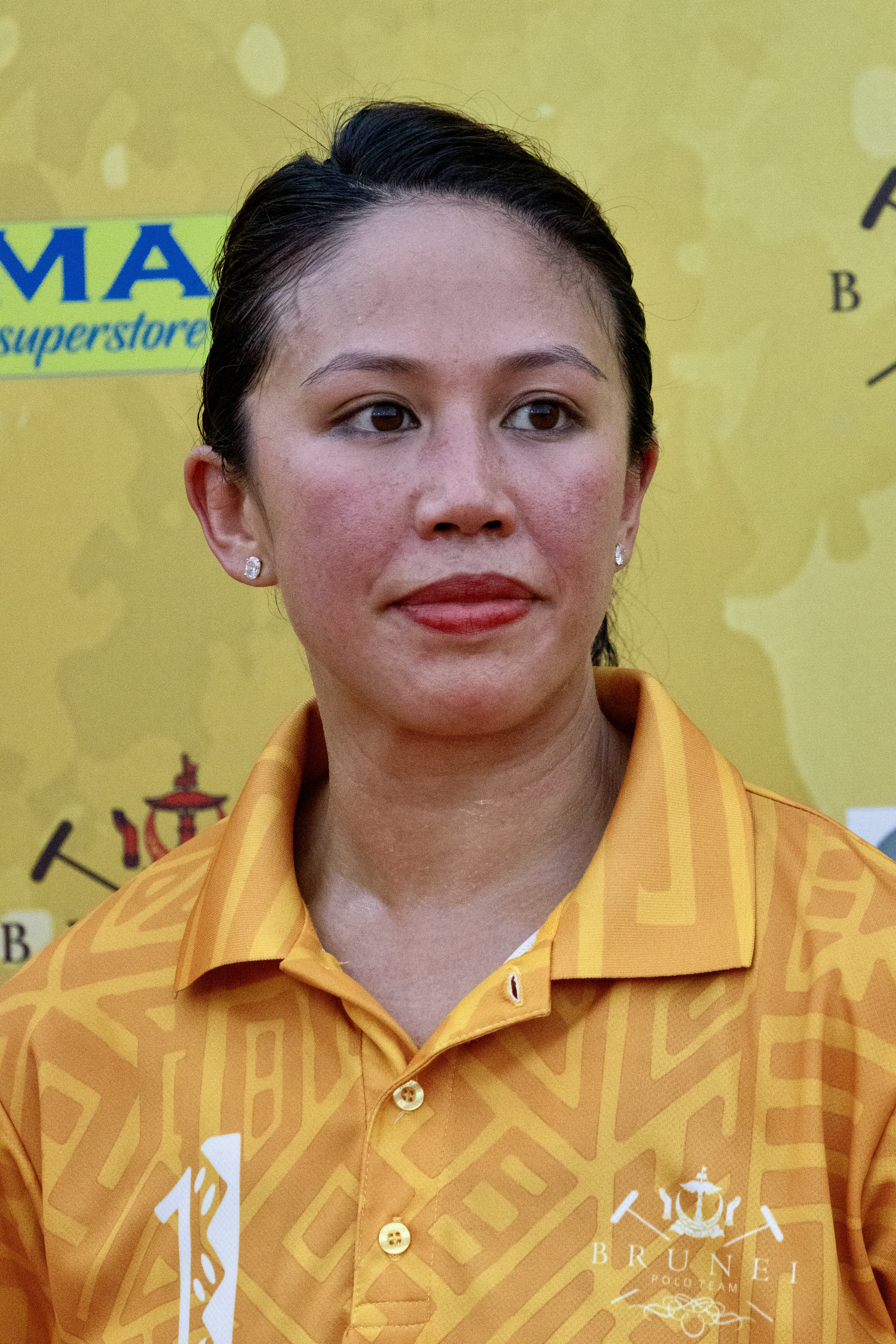
Azemah Ni'matul Bolkiah, Princess of Brunei

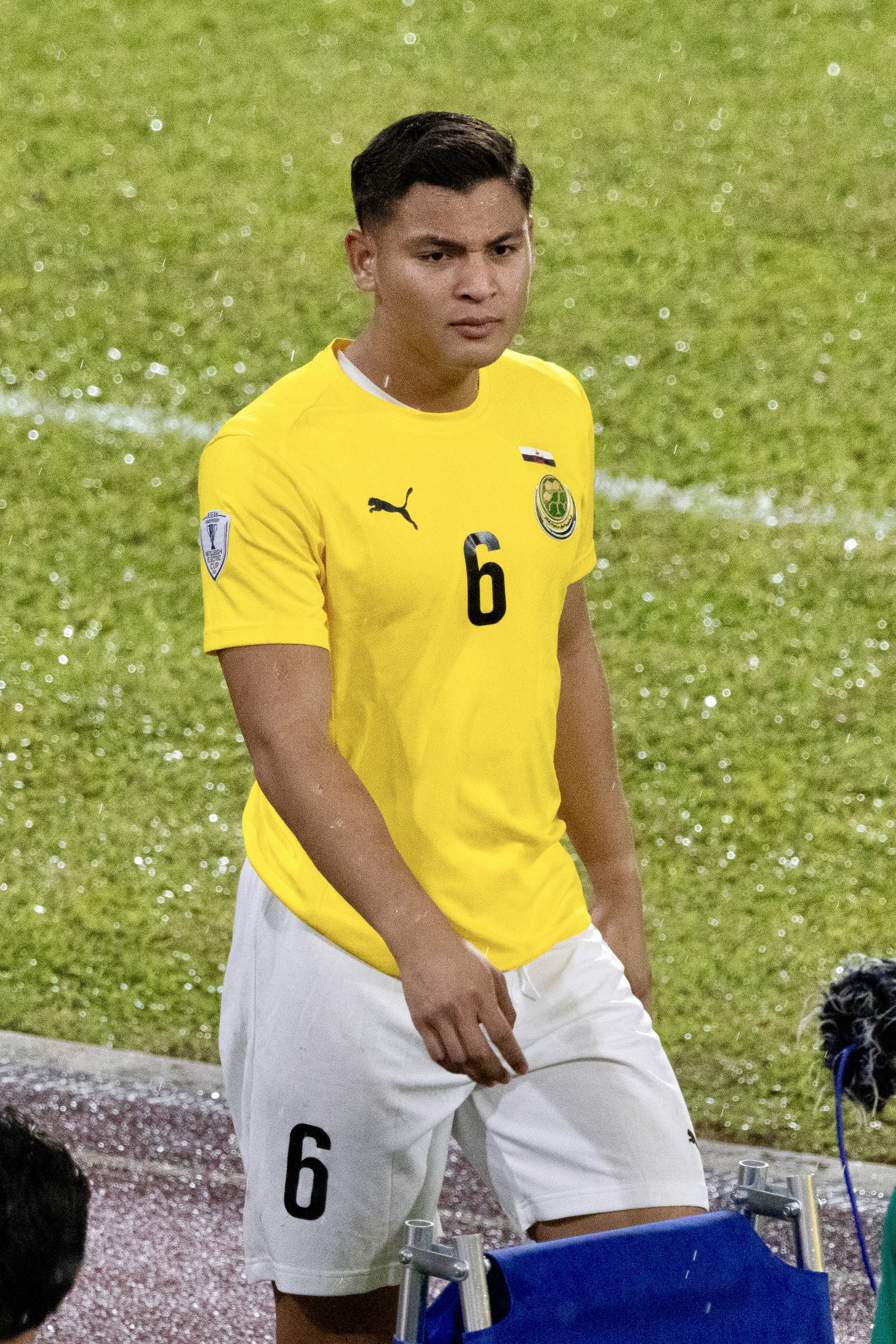
Wafi Aminuddin, national football player

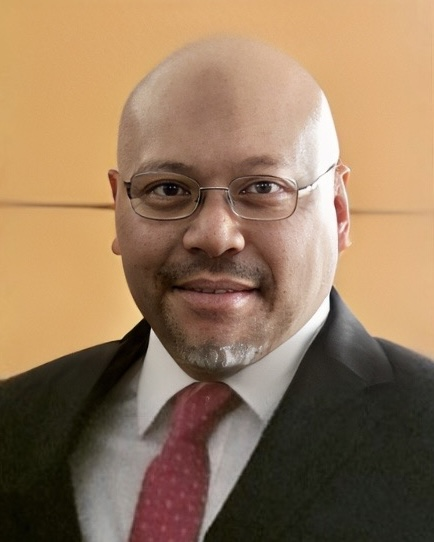
Abdul Mutalib, former Minister of Transport and Infocommunications
