= Abdullah Bakar =

Bruneian politician (born 1951)

Yang Dimuliakan Pehin Orang Kaya Hamzah Pahlawan Dato Seri Setia Abdullah Bakar PSNB DPMB PKL
- عبدالله بكر
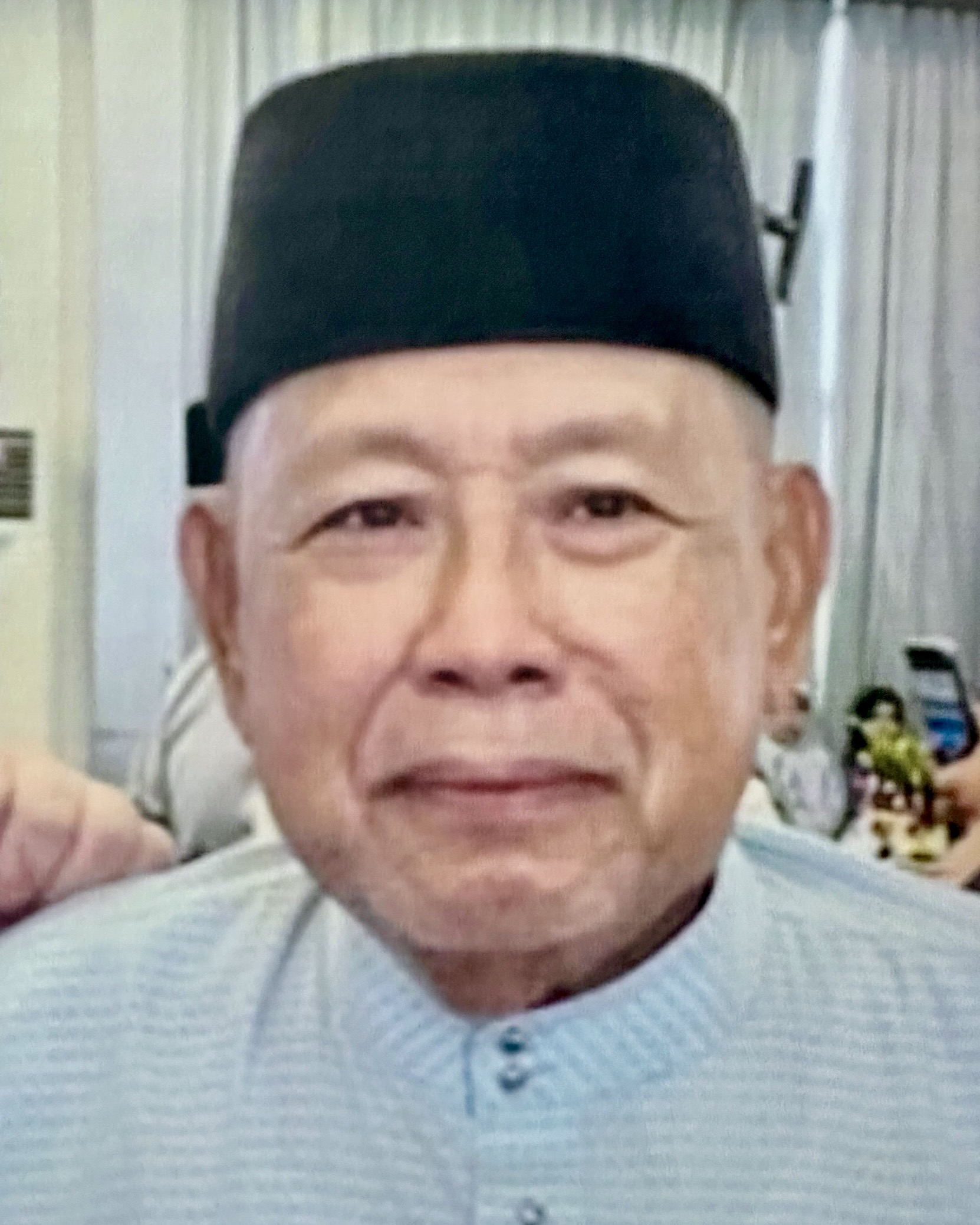
- Abdullah in 2023

5th Minister of Communications
- In office 29 May 2010 – 22 October 2015
- Monarch: Hassanal Bolkiah
- Preceded by: Abu Bakar Apong
- Succeeded by: Mustappa Sirat

4th Minister of Development
- In office 24 May 2005 – 29 May 2010
- Deputy: Mat Suny; Ali Apong
- Preceded by: Ahmad Jumat
- Succeeded by: Suyoi Osman

Chairman of Bank Islam Brunei Darussalam
- In office 2006–2010
- Preceded by: Office established
- Succeeded by: Yahya Bakar

Personal details
- Born: 29 July 1951 (age 75) Kampong Lurong Dalam, Kampong Ayer, Brunei
- Relatives: Yahya Bakar (brother)
- Education: University of Leeds (BSc); Harvard University (MPA)
- Occupation: Civil servant; politician

Abdullah bin Haji Bakar (born 29 July 1951) is a Bruneian aristocrat and politician who took office as the Minister of Communications from 2010 to 2015, and Minister of Development from 2005 to 2010.

== Education ==
Abdullah is a fellow in the Edward S. Mason Program in Public Policy and Management at Harvard University's John Fitzgerald Kennedy School of Government from 1993 to 1994. He attended Harvard University from 1993 to 1994 to earn his master's degree in public administration. At the University of Leeds, he also earned his BSc (Hons) in Electrical and Electronic Engineering in 1972.

== Career ==
Abdullah's career began as an Assistant Telecom Controller on 10 August 1992; Telecom Engineer on 1 January 1977; deputy director of Telecom on 11 February 1981; Director of Telecom on 1 April 1984; Senior Special Duties Officer, Ministry of Communications on 15 February 1996; managing director of DST from July 1998 to 13 December 1999; Permanent Secretary of the Ministry of Religious Affairs on 18 September 1998; Permanent Secretary of the Ministry of Communications on 26 July 1999, Minister of Development from 24 May 2005 to 28 May 2010; appointed as Minister of Communications on 29 May 2010.

=== Minister of Development ===
During the 2005 Bruneian cabinet reshuffle, Abdullah was appointed minister of development on 24 May.

On 26–28 August 2005, Yaacob Ibrahim led a group to Brunei. Minister Yaacob and his counterpart, Abdullah Bakar, signed a Memorandum of understanding (MOU) on environmental cooperation during the visit. Solid and hazardous waste management, water resource management, recycling, and environmental education are all potential areas of collaboration under the MOU. An Annual Exchange of Visits (AEV), which would take the form of a ministerial meeting jointly presided over by both ministers, would also be launched with the signing of the MOU.

Only 5% of Brunei's land is categorized as being available for residential or industrial use, with residential use taking precedence, according to statistics made public by Abdullah Bakar, on 17 October 2009. Only about 28,825 hectares (71,230 acres) of the 576,500 ha total landmass of the country have not been designated for preservation or have already been used, according to the minister. He said it was important to manage land resources given that there are already 17,000 people on waiting lists for public housing, with that number likely to reach 30,000 by 2012.

=== Minister of Communications ===
During the 2010 Bruneian cabinet reshuffle, Abdullah was appointed minister of communications on 29 May.

On 12 November 2010, in Bandar Seri Begawan, the transport ministers of the ASEAN member states and Japan gathered for the 8th ASEAN and Japan Transport Ministers Meeting (ATM+Japan). The Meeting was co-chaired by Abdullah Bakar and Toshiaki Koizumi. From 28 November to 1 December 2012, he attended the 18th ASEAN Transport Ministers Meeting in Bali, Indonesia. Brunei is not the only country in Southeast Asia looking to the container shipping industry for expansion; Singapore's Port and Malaysia's Port Klang are competitors in this industry. However, he said that rates of increase in transshipment volumes in Southeast Asia are anticipated to be in the range of 5–6% annually, providing Brunei with the chance to capture a portion of the market.

On 15 December 2014, Abdullah Bakar unveiled the "White paper" for land transportation, which paves the way for reducing Bruneians' reliance on automobiles, preventing traffic congestion, attaining a sustainable society, and enhancing governance. According to him, the "white paper" outlines a number of policies organized under seven key topics that would serve as the basis for the creation of certain national transport policies and the Land Transport Master Plan. The minister emphasized a number of advantages that the Land Transport Master Plan's execution will provide to the people of Brunei as the publication of the "white paper" advances its implementation. Following the 2015 Bruneian cabinet reshuffle on 22 October, his tenure as minister came to an end.

== Other appointments ==
Abdullah also held the positions of President of PUJA (National Institution for Engineers, Architects, and Surveyors, Brunei Darussalam) from January 2004 to December 2009, Chairman of the board of directors of BIBD from 1 February 2006 to January 2010, Chairman of Pantai Mentiri Golf Club from 24 May 2005 to 29 May 2010, and Chairman of the Authority for Info-communications Technology Industry (AITI) from 1 January 2003 to 13 July 2005.

== Personal life ==
Abdullah is blessed with seven children; 4 sons and 3 daughters. He is married to Datin Hajah Hasiah binti Pehin Orang Kaya Pekerma Setia Dato Paduka Haji Hasim. His hobbies include; reading, golfing, astronomy, and photography. He is also the older brother of Dato Yahya Bakar, former Minister of Industry and Primary Resources. Permanent Secretary at the Ministry of Defence, Captain (Retired) Dato Abdul Rahman is another sibling of his.

Abdullah's residence is located in Kampong Lambak Kiri.

== Honours ==
Abdullah was bestowed the Manteri title of Yang Berhormat (The Honourable) Pehin Orang Kaya Hamzah Pahlawan on 24 April 2004. Moreover, he has earned the following honours;

- Order of Setia Negara Brunei First Class (PSNB; 15 July 2006) – Dato Seri Setia
- Order of Seri Paduka Mahkota Brunei Second Class (DPMB; 15 July 1987) – Dato Paduka
- Long Service Medal (PKL; 23 December 2000)
- Sultan of Brunei Silver Jubilee Medal (5 October 1992)
- National Day Silver Jubilee Medal (23 February 2009)

Political offices
Preceded by Abu Bakar Apong	5th Minister of Communications; 29 May 2010 – 22 October 2015	Succeeded by Mustappa Sirat
Preceded by Ahmad Jumat	4th Minister of Development; 24 May 2005 – 29 May 2010	Succeeded by Suyoi Osman
Business positions
Preceded by Office established	Chairman of Bank Islam Brunei Darussalam; 2006–2010	Succeeded by Yahya Bakar
