= Authority for Info-communications Technology Industry =

Coordinates: 4.3940082°N 114.9417214°E

Authority for Infocommunications Technology Industry of Brunei Darussalam
- Autoriti Industri Teknologi Infokomunikasi Brunei Darussalam (AITI) ڤيهق بركواس ايندوستري تيكنولوڬي اينفو-كومونيكاسي
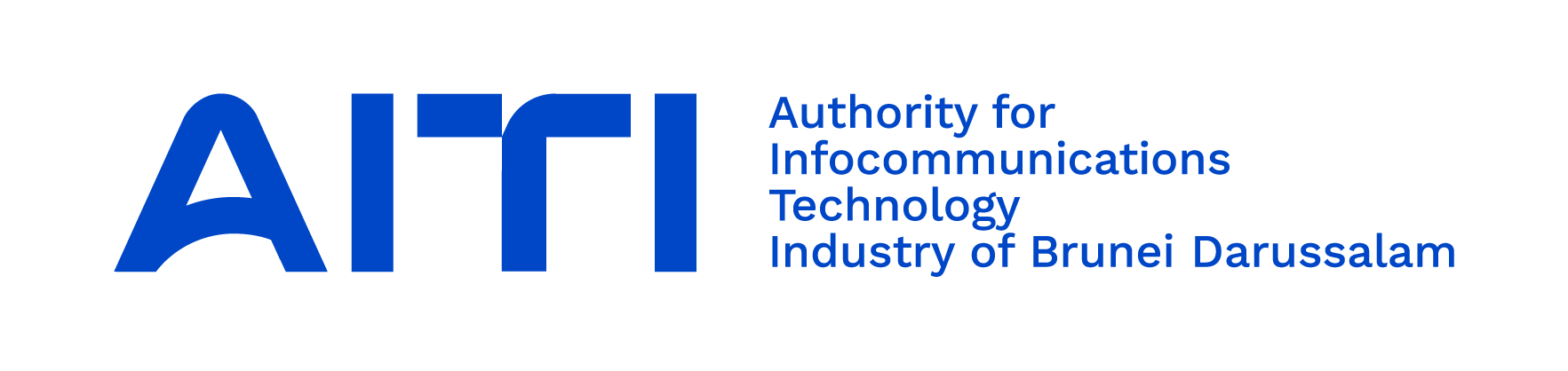

Agency overview
- Formed: 1 January 2003; 23 years ago
- Headquarters: Block B14, Simpang 32-5, Anggerek Desa, Brunei-Muara, Brunei BB3713
- Agency executives: Jailani Buntar, Chief Executive; Dato Seri Setia Pengiran Shamhary bin Dato Paduka Pengiran Haji Mustapha, Chairman
- Parent ministry: Ministry of Transport and Infocommunications
- Website: www.aiti.gov.bn/%20www.aiti.gov.bn

The Authority for Infocommunications Technology Industry of Brunei Darussalam (Note: Autoriti Industri Teknologi Infokomunikasi Brunei Darussalam; Jawi: ڤيهق بركواس ايندوستري تيكنولوڬي اينفو-كومونيكاسي) (AITI) is a statutory body established in 2003 under the Telecommunications Successor Company Order 2001 and Telecommunications Order 2001. These legislative instruments created AITI as a corporate entity tasked with overseeing and regulating Brunei's information and communications technology (ICT) landscape. Its responsibilities include regulating radio communications and telecommunications, managing and planning the use of the radio frequency spectrum, and promoting the development of the ICT industry. Through these core functions, AITI plays a vital role in advancing the nation's digital transformation and technological growth. It operates under the jurisdiction of the Ministry of Transport and Infocommunications.

== Functions ==
The AITI has a broad role to play in the development and regulation of the ICT industry in Brunei. Its primary functions are to improve the efficiency and international competitiveness of the industry, ensurethat accessible and high-quality telecommunication services are provided, and foster fair and effective market competition. AITI also represents Brunei in international ICT matters and provides advice to the government on national priorities and policies related to the sector. Besides its regulatory function, AITI licenses, sets industry standards, and monitors the installation of both hardware and software across the ICT environment.

AITI's regulatory ambit includes telecommunication systems and services, including the management of satellite orbits, submarine cables, radio frequency spectrum, and related infrastructure. The authority actively encourages investment, research and development, and industry self-regulation, in addition to being a significant contributor to ICT manpower development and training. Furthermore, AITI offers advisory services to governmental agencies in ICT implementation, contributes to national education and training programmes, and establishes standards for data protection and privacy. It promotes the usage of the internet, boosts the growth of e-commerce with the appropriate regulatory frameworks, and provides consultancy and advisory services for the wider utilisation of ICT in the country.

== History ==
AITI was established on 1 January 2003 following the enforcement of the Telecommunications Order 2001. At its inception, AITI began operations with just five employees and took immediate steps to develop a regulatory framework for the telecommunications sector. In 2004, AITI was mandated to establish the Brunei National Computer Emergency Response Team, strengthening the country's cybersecurity capabilities. The following year, in 2005, AITI was appointed to lead negotiations for a submarine cable network, reflecting its growing role in national ICT development.

On 1 April 2006, the Telecommunications Successor Company Order 2001 came into effect, leading to the corporatisation of the Ministry of Communications' Telecommunications Department as Telekom Brunei. Regulatory authority was transferred to AITI, strengthening its role as Brunei's main telecommunications regulator. Previously, the department had acted as both provider and regulator. AITI’s licensing and regulatory powers also came into full effect that year. Progress continued in the following years, with the establishment of the e-Government Technical Authority Body within AITI in 2007, further advancing Brunei's digital governance initiatives. In 2008, AITI was appointed as the Secretariat for both the Brunei ICT Awards and the Brunei Information Technology Council, cementing its role as a key driver in the nation's ICT development.

Between 2010 and 2019, AITI introduced several key initiatives to advance the ICT sector. In 2010, it launched the AITI Grant Scheme to support the ICT industry. The following year, AITI signed an MoU with MDeC Malaysia to develop the creative content industry and introduced both the ICT Competency Training Programme and the ICT Accredited Business scheme. In 2012, it hosted a Child Online Protection Framework Workshop, and in 2013, it awarded 1800 MHz spectrum rights for 4G services. AITI participated in KL Converge! for the first time in 2014. In 2015, it developed the IFC GHD and IFC NHS Codes for fibre cabling and rationalised telecom tariffs, including the removal of mobile incoming call charges. AITI hosted the ASEAN Cyberkids Camp in 2018 and issued guidelines for subscriber licence fees. In 2019, it released equipment importation guidelines, launched the ICT Savviness Programme for senior citizens, and organised the Cybershop Fest and Fair.

In 2020, AITI waived Cellular Mobile Subscriber Licence fees and launched ekadaiBrunei.bn to support local digital commerce. It also conducted a Smart Devices Donation Drive in collaboration with the Ministry of Education and Ministry of Transport and Infocommunications, and issued the Competition Code and Tariff Code to strengthen regulatory oversight. In 2021, AITI introduced Coding.bn to equip youth jobseekers with digital skills and initiated the 5G Pilot Project. That same year, AITI, through the National 5G Taskforce, began laying the groundwork for 5G implementation in Brunei. In 2022, the agency launched the Productivity and Efficiency Joint Funding for Digital Adoption Scheme and the Brunei ICT Industry Competency Framework, while also expanding the Digital for All programme to reach single mothers and welfare groups.

== Senior leadership ==
The senior leadership of the AITI is composed of a chairman and a minimum of three, but not more than seven, other members, as determined by the minister. Their roles and responsibilities, as well as the procedures governing the authority's operations, are outlined in the first schedule of the relevant legislation. This structured leadership ensures effective governance and strategic oversight of AITI's functions.

As of 2025, the senior leadership officeholders are as follows:

- Chief Executive Officer: Haji Jailani bin Haji Buntar (since 9 December 2021)
- Chairman: Pengiran Haji Shamhary bin Pengiran Haji Mustapha (since January 2023)
- Deputy Chief Executive, Development: Julianah binti Ali Ahmad
- Deputy Chief Executive, Telecoms: Hajah Siti Hairmi binti Haji Ibrahim

=== List of former CEOs ===
- Haji Yahkup bin Haji Menudin (2010–2016)
- Pengiran Haji Mohd Zain bin Pengiran Haji Abdul Razak (2016–2018)

=== List of former chairpersons ===
- Haji Abdullah bin Haji Bakar (2003–2005)
- Haji Alaihuddin bin Haji Mohd Taha (2010–2014)
- Haji Abdul Mutalib bin Haji Mohammad Yusof (2014–2016)
- Haji Azhar bin Haji Ahmad (2016–2018)
- Haji Matsatejo bin Sokiaw (2018–2021)
