= Pengiran Shamhary =

Bruneian politician

Yang Berhormat Pengiran Dato Seri Setia Shamhary Mustapha PSNB
- ڤڠيرن شامهري
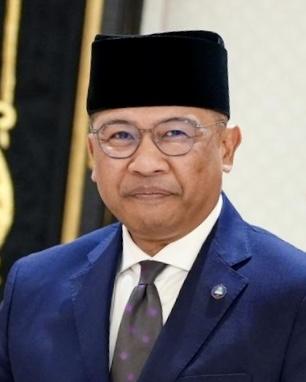
- Pengiran Shamhary in 2024

9th Minister of Culture, Youth and Sports
- Incumbent
- Assumed office 4 June 2026
- Monarch: Hassanal Bolkiah
- Preceded by: Nazmi Mohamad

Personal details
- Born: Brunei
- Education: Anglia Ruskin University
- Occupation: Politician

Pengiran Dato Seri Setia Haji Shamhary bin Pengiran Dato Paduka Haji Mustapha is a Bruneian politician who has served as the Minister of Culture, Youth and Sports since 2026. He previously served as the eighth Minister of Transport and Infocommunications from 2022 to 2026.

== Career ==
In 1992, Pengiran Shamhary began his career at the Ministry of Development, where he worked on project development and management, international contacts, and policy development.

Later, in 2004, Pengiran Shamhary joined Brunei Shell Petroleum (BSP). He held a number of executive positions at BSP, including Business Improvement Manager, Acting Head of HSSE, Head of Environment, and Head of Corporate Operations. His responsibilities included organization change, corporate governance, and strategy formulation in addition to project planning and execution. Later in 2013, Pengiran Dato Shamhary was appointed managing director of Brunei Shell Marketing (BSM), where he was responsible for the logistics of supply and distribution as well as the sales and marketing plan for companies operating in the land, sea, and air sectors. ensuring corporate sustainability and expansion through dependability in performance, innovation, and new ventures.

Pengiran Shamhary held the job of managing director of Brunei Gas Carriers (BGC) from 1 November 2020 till his nomination as Minister. He was responsible for the consistency of operations, the growth of regional capabilities, and the creation of the company's long-term plan. Following a cabinet reshuffle on 7 June 2022, Pengiran Shamhary was appointed as the Minister of Transport and Infocommunications. Upon taking that position, he ended his time with the Brunei Gas Carriers. At the same time, he became a member of the Privy Council and Cabinet Minister.

The Air Services Agreement was signed in Brunei in June 2022 by the Minister of Transport and Communications, José Agustinho da Silva, and his Bruneian counterpart, Pengiran Shamhary, who was accompanied by the Minister of Foreign Affairs and Cooperation, Adaljiza Magno.

On 4 June 2026, following a cabinet reshuffle, Pengiran Shamhary was appointed as the Minister of Culture, Youth and Sports for a four-year term.

== Honours ==
Pengiran Shamhary has earned the following honours:

- Order of Setia Negara Brunei First Class (PSNB; 15 July 2022) – Dato Seri Setia

Political offices
Preceded by Abdul Mutalib	8th Minister of Transport and Infocommunications; 7 June 2022 – present	Succeeded by Incumbent
