= Ministry of Transport and Infocommunications =

Government ministry of Brunei

- Kementerian Pengangkutan dan Infokomunikasi
- National emblem of Brunei

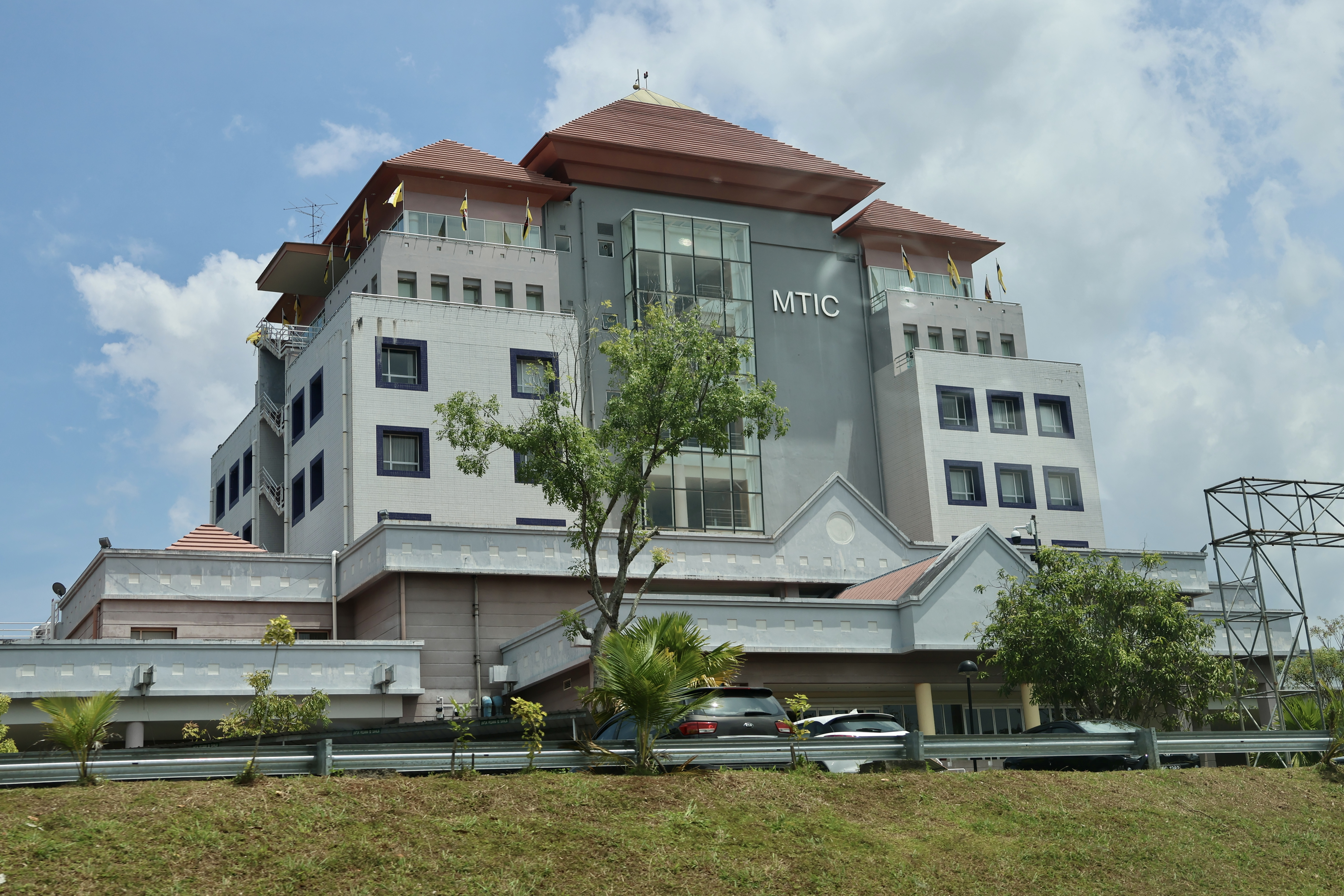
- Ministry building

Ministry overview
- Formed: 1 January 1984
- Jurisdiction: Government of Brunei
- Headquarters: Bandar Seri Begawan, Brunei; 4°55′06″N 114°56′41″E
- Employees: 1,519 (2024)
- Annual budget: ▲$101 million BND (2021)
- Minister responsible: Shamhary Mustapha, Minister
- Website: www.mtic.gov.bn

The Ministry of Transport and Infocommunications (MTIC; Malay: Kementerian Pengangkutan dan Infokomunikasi), formerly known as the Ministry of Communications (Kementerian Perhubungan), is a cabinet-level ministry in the government of Brunei which oversees civil aviation, land and maritime transport, telecommunications and meteorology in the country. It is currently led by a minister and the incumbent is Pengiran Shamhary Pengiran Mustapha, (Note: His current official Malay name is Pengiran Shamhary bin Pengiran Dato Paduka Haji Mustapha.) who took office since 7 June 2022. The ministry is headquartered in Bandar Seri Begawan.

== Portfolio ==
- Maritime and Port Authority Brunei Darussalam (Pihak Berkuasa Maritim Dan Pelabuhan Brunei Darussalam, MPABD)

== Budget ==
In the 2021–22 fiscal year, the ministry had been allocated a budget of B$101 million, (Note: ≈US$73 million as of July 2022) an 8.7 percent increase from the previous year.

== Ministers ==
No.	Portrait	Minister	Term start	Term end	Time in office	Ref.
1		Bahrin Abbas	1 January 1984	20 October 1986	2 years, 292 days	
2		Abdul Aziz Umar	20 October 1986	30 November 1988	2 years, 41 days	
3		Zakaria Sulaiman	30 November 1988	24 May 2005	16 years, 175 days	
4		Abu Bakar Apong	24 May 2005	29 May 2010	5 years, 5 days	
5		Abdullah Bakar	29 May 2010	22 October 2015	5 years, 146 days	
6		Mustappa Sirat	22 October 2015	29 January 2018	2 years, 99 days	
7		Abdul Mutalib	30 January 2018	7 June 2022	4 years, 128 days	
8		Shamhary Mustapha	7 June 2022	Incumbent	2 years, 312 days	
