= Ministry of Energy and Industry =

Ministry of Energy and Industry may refer to:

- Ministry of Energy and Industry (Albania)
- Ministry of Energy and Industry (Qatar)
- Ministry of Energy, Industry and Mineral Resources, Saudi Arabia

== See also ==
- Ministry of Energy, Manpower and Industry (Brunei)
- Ministry of Industry, Energy and Tourism (Iceland)
- Ministry of Trade, Industry and Energy (South Korea)
