= Anthony Abell College =

College in Seria, Brunei

- Maktab Anthony Abell

Location
- Jalan Bolkiah; Seria, KB1733; Brunei
- Coordinates: 4°36′31.4″N 114°19′53.3″E

Information
- Former name: Government English School (1952–1958)
- School type: Government
- Motto: Kata-Kata Itu Biarlah Kota (Let Words Be Promises)
- Opened: 17 December 1958; 67 years ago
- Founder: Sir Anthony Abell
- School district: Cluster 6
- Authority: Ministry of Education
- Principal: Shim Sheau huei
- Grades: Years 7-11
- Gender: Coeducational
- Enrollment: 676
- Yearbook: Sinaran Penuntut
- Affiliations: CIE
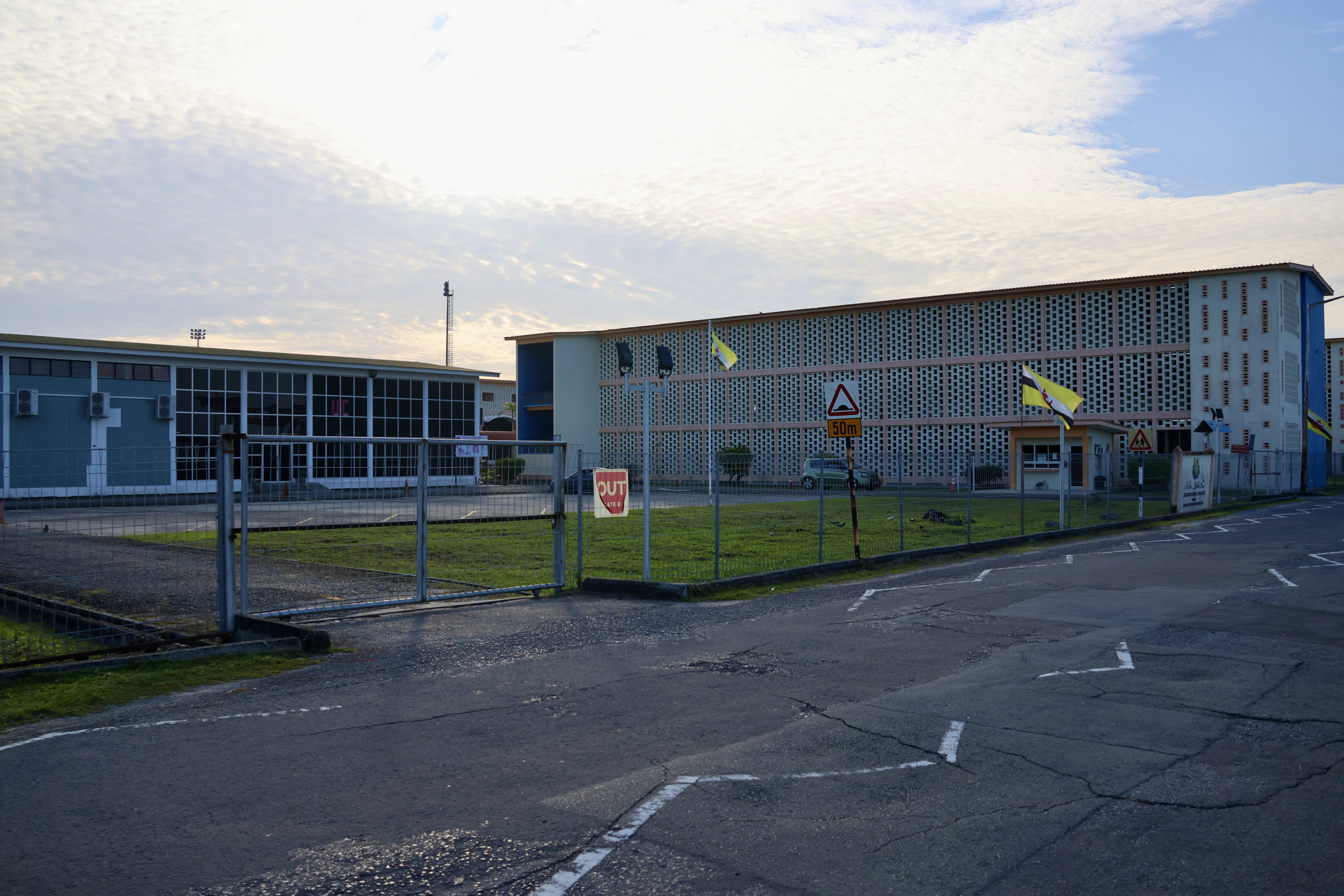
- Upper Campus

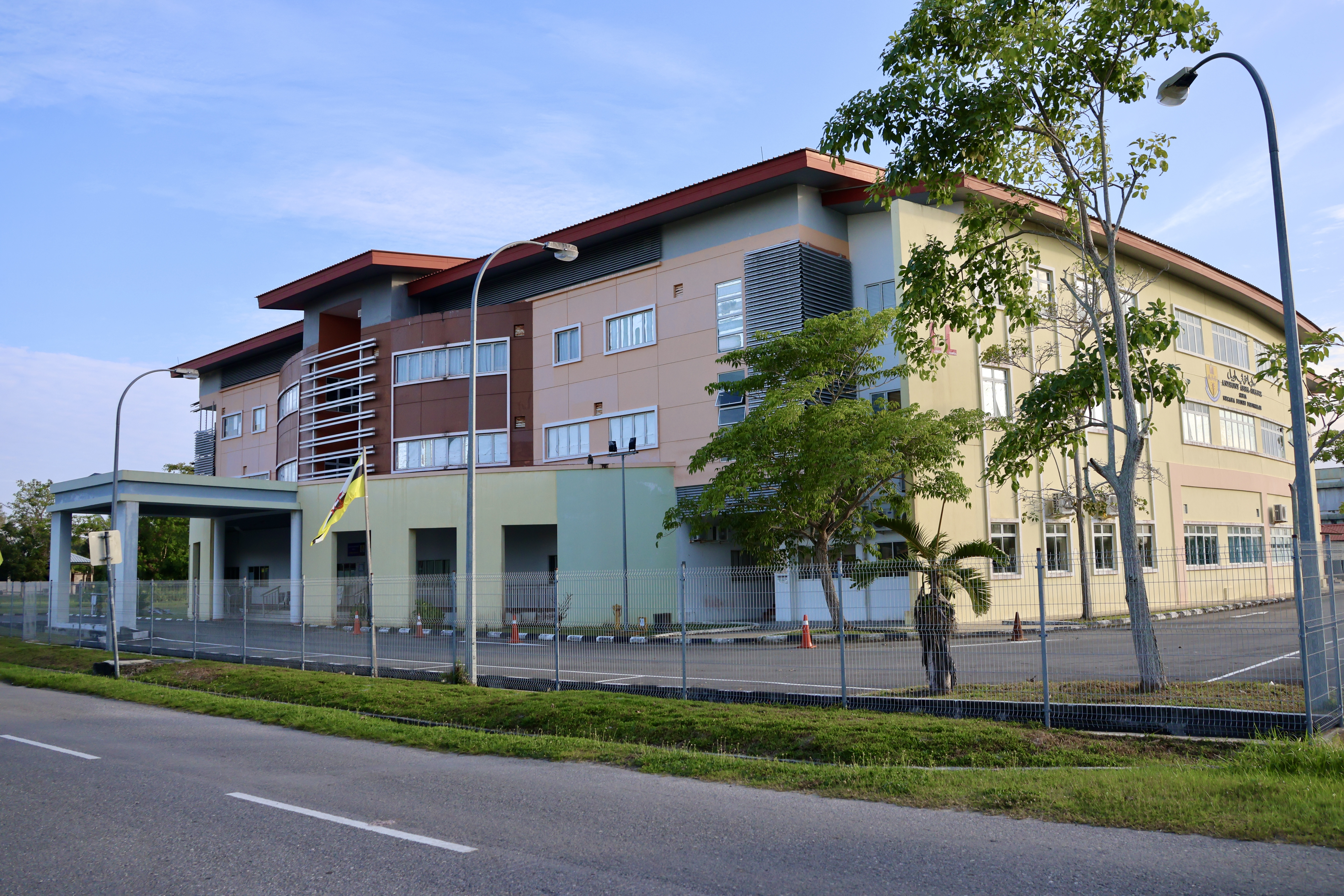
- Lower Campus

Anthony Abell College (abbrev: AAC; Malay: Maktab Anthony Abell) is a government secondary school in Seria, a town in Belait District, Brunei. It was one of the earliest secondary schools to be established in the country. The school provides five years of general secondary education leading up to O Level qualification. It has 630 students. The current principal is Shim Sheau Huei.

== Etymology ==
The college is named after His Excellency Sir Anthony Foster Abell, a British colonial official who served as the 3rd Governor of Sarawak from 1949 to 1959. The first draft of the constitution of Brunei, drafted by Abell and his colleagues, protected Brunei's sovereignty while also catering to the wishes of the country's Malay constitutional committee. In 1958, the 1957 London Negotiations were revisited in Brunei. At a meeting on 27 October 1958, at Istana Darul Hana, Sultan Omar Ali Saifuddien III and Abell talked about the outcomes of the London negotiations.

== History ==
The school founded in December 1952 and was known as the Government English School. The first building was only a scout hut located in Jalan Sultan, Kuala Belait. This building housed 22 students and one teacher who was also the principal, Mr. D.S. Carter.

In January 1953, the Government English School moved to Seria Town at the current Post Office site with a building of 2 classrooms. In January 1954, the school had its own building located between Jalan Tengah and Lorong 2 Seria accommodating 57 students.

In 1958, the school moved to the present building at Jalan Sultan Omar Ali, Seria. During the year, the first phase of the college building complex was opened by Sir Anthony Abell himself. Clearing and piling for the college second phase were part of the work during the three government English schools construction projects in that same year. To commemorate the event of the college's renaming to Anthony Abell College, Abell officiated the opening and placed a plaque in the AAC on 18 December 1958.

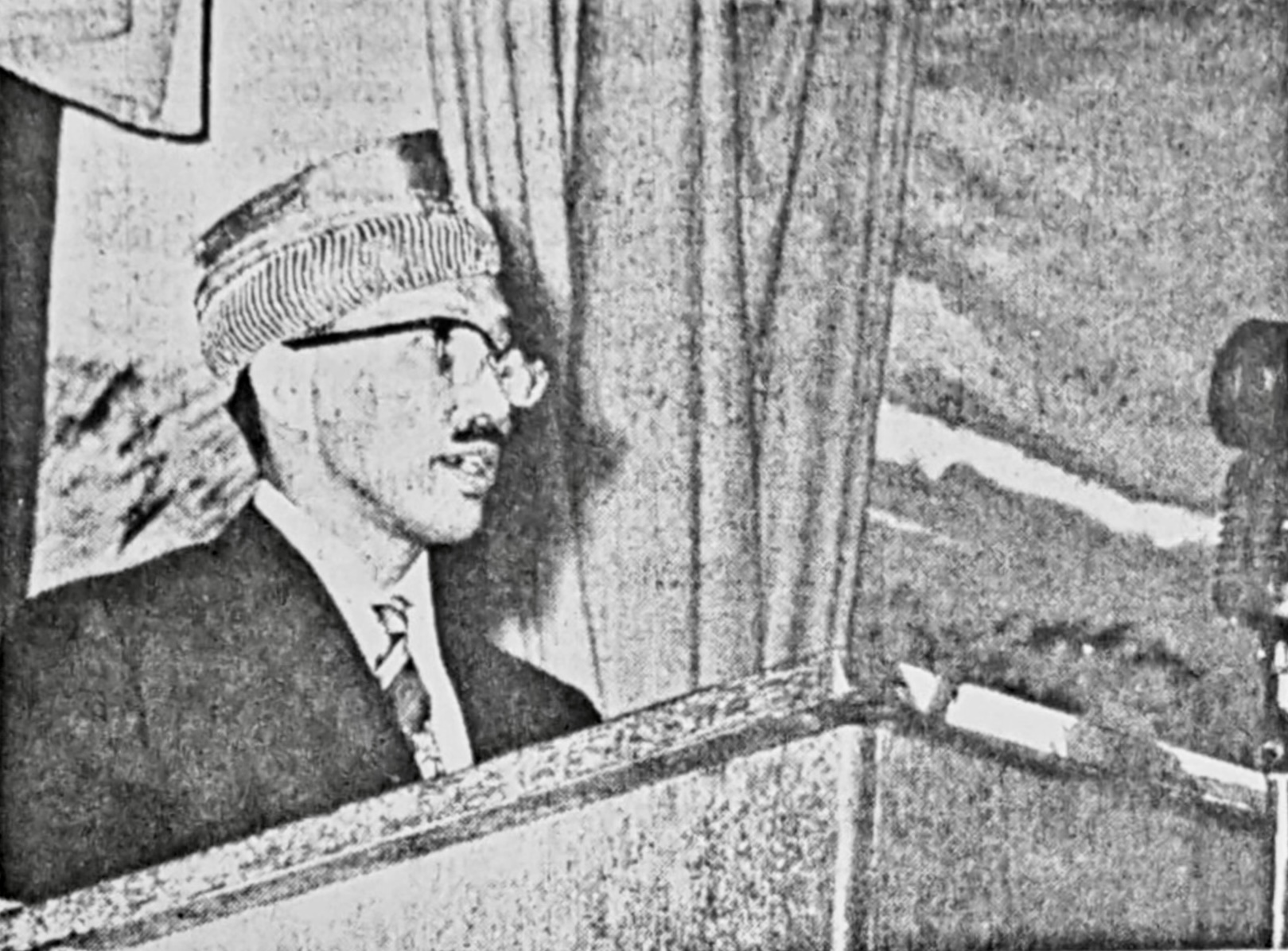
Sultan Omar Ali Saifuddin III giving a titah to the staff of AAC in 1963

The construction of two coeducational preparatory and junior secondary schools, one in Kuala Belait and one in Tutong, with capacity for 1,080 students each, staff housing, and hostel accommodations for 400 of them (200 boys and 200 girls) constitutes the primary development project in English-medium education. This project was approved in 1966. After these two schools' preliminary sections are finished, the AAC preparatory annexes in Kuala Belait and Tutong, respectively, will be replaced.

As of 1967, the Sultan Omar Ali Saifuddien College (SOASC) in Brunei Town, the AAC at Seria with preparatory annexes at Kuala Belait and Tutong, and the Raja Isteri Girls' High School (STPRI) are the three government English-medium schools. At the time, AAC was extended to School Certificate/GCE O Level. The preparatory and secondary divisions of the college are coeducational.

There were preparatory courses offered in 1972 at the following schools: Sufri Bolkiah English School in Tutong, Perdana Wazir English School in Kuala Belait, AAC, and its associated buildings at several Malay primary schools. In 1972, the newly constructed dorms for girls and boys at Perdana Wazir English School and AAC were still closed. They can't be opened until Kuala Belait and Seria's new sewage systems are finished. From four to seven platoons, the Brunei Cadet Corps has expanded and is presently present at seven schools, including AAC. The year's last project was the B$22,200 Block 6 Classrooms for AAC construction.

In 2002, the college celebrated its Golden Jubilee.

== Notable people ==
=== Notable staff ===
- Roderick Yong (born 1932), diplomat and educator

=== Notable alumni ===
- Adnan Buntar, diplomat
- Abidin Abdul Rashid (1939–2020), politician
- Sulaiman Damit (1941–2016), military officer and diplomat
- Husin Ahmad (born 1944), military officer
- Pengiran Anak Abdul Aziz (born 1945), cheteria and spouse of Princess Masna
- Razali Johari (born 1946), former chairman of BIMP-EAGA
- Norsiah Abdul Gapar (born 1952), writer
- Suyoi Osman (born 1952), politician and diplomat
- Jemat Ampal (born 1954), diplomat
- Yasmin Umar (born 1956), politician and military officer
- Maizurah Abdul Rahim (born 1999), track and field athlete, National sprinter
- Malai Abdullah Othman (died 2019), social worker
Notable Anthony Abell College Alumni

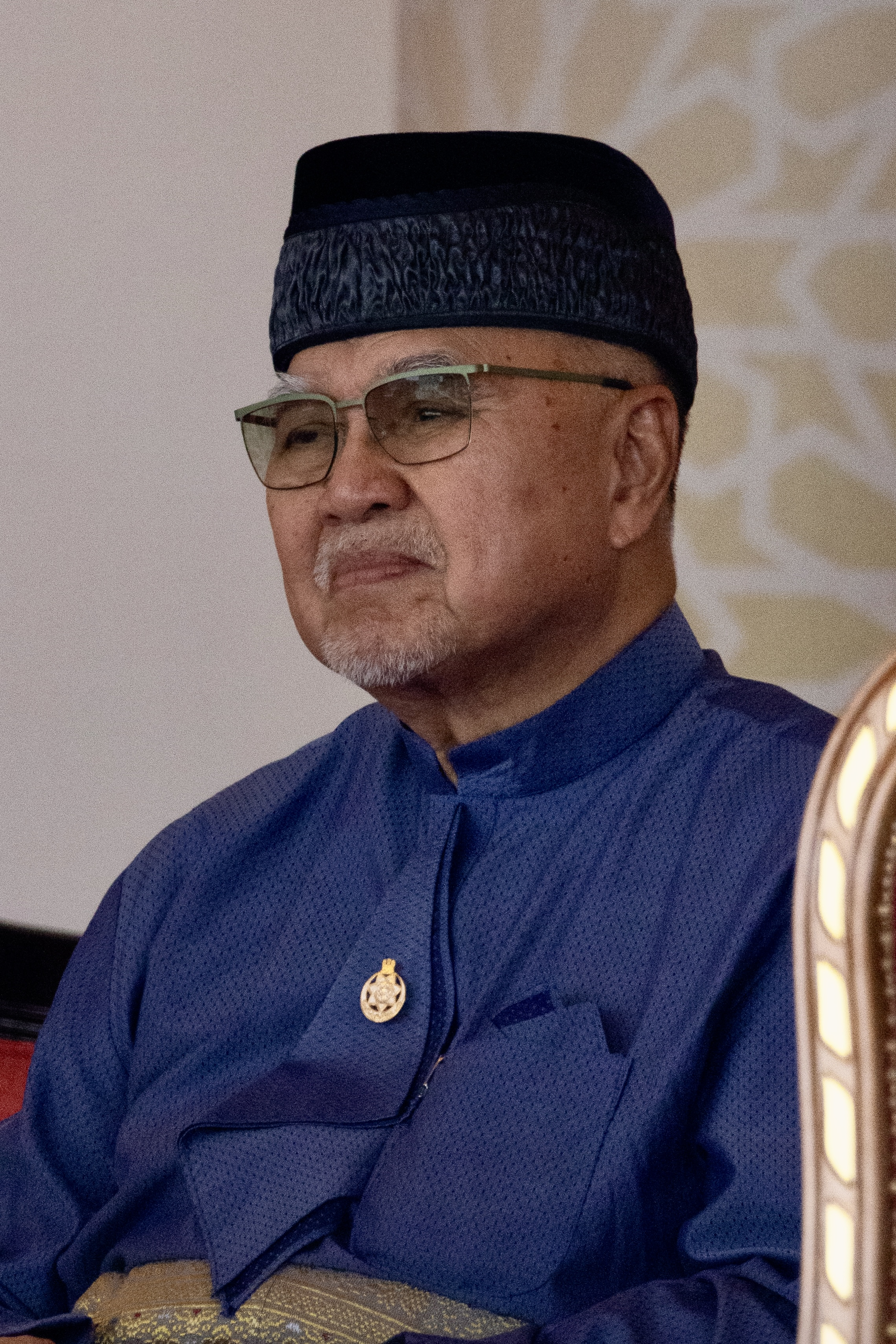
Pengiran Anak Abdul Aziz, Yang Di-Pertua Adat Istiadat Negara

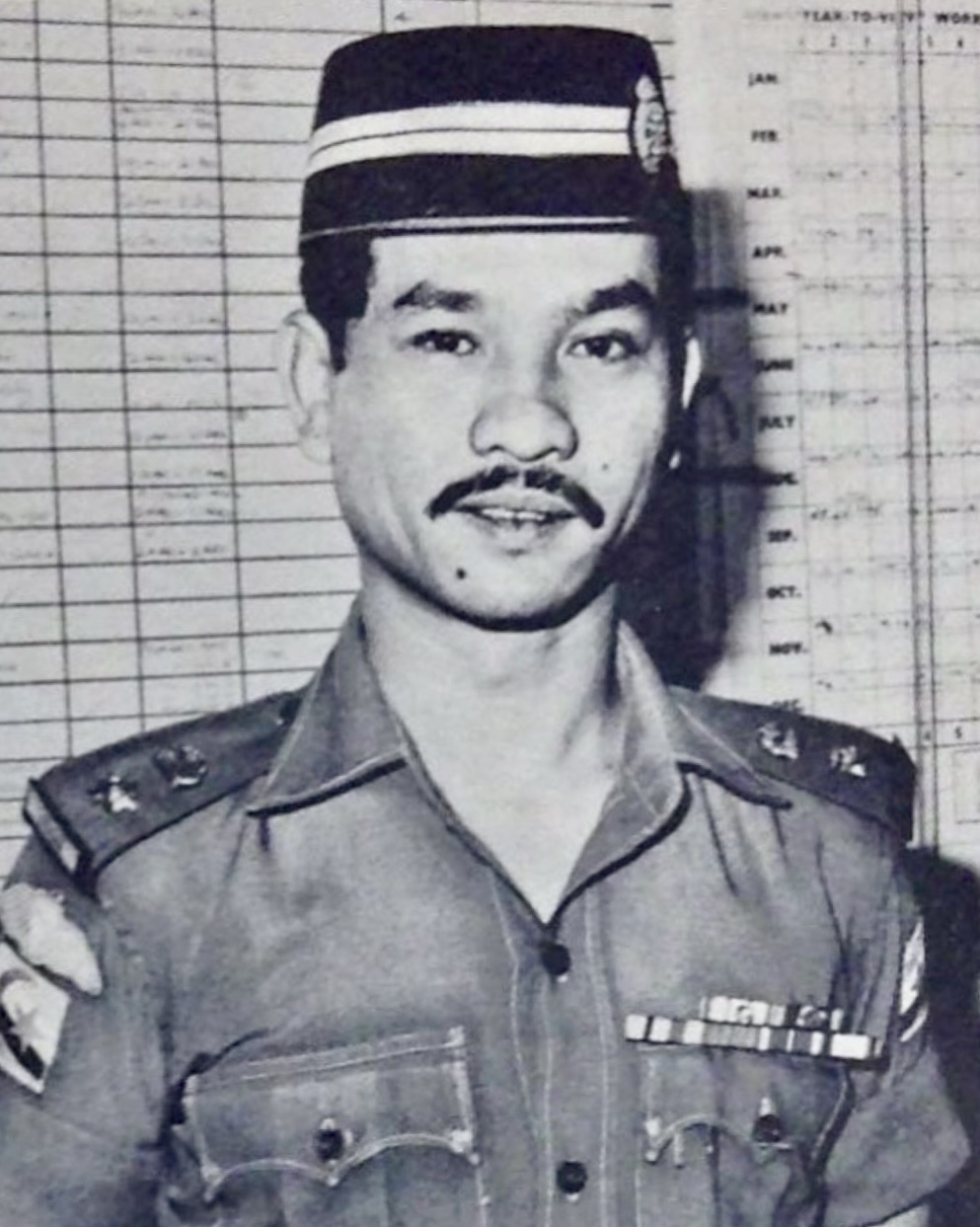
Sulaiman Damit, 2nd Commander of the Royal Brunei Armed Forces

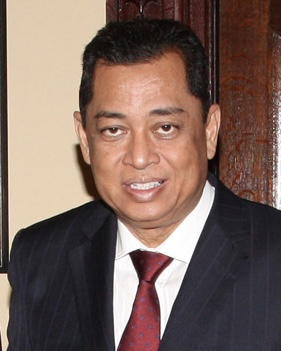
Yasmin Umar, 3rd Minister of Energy

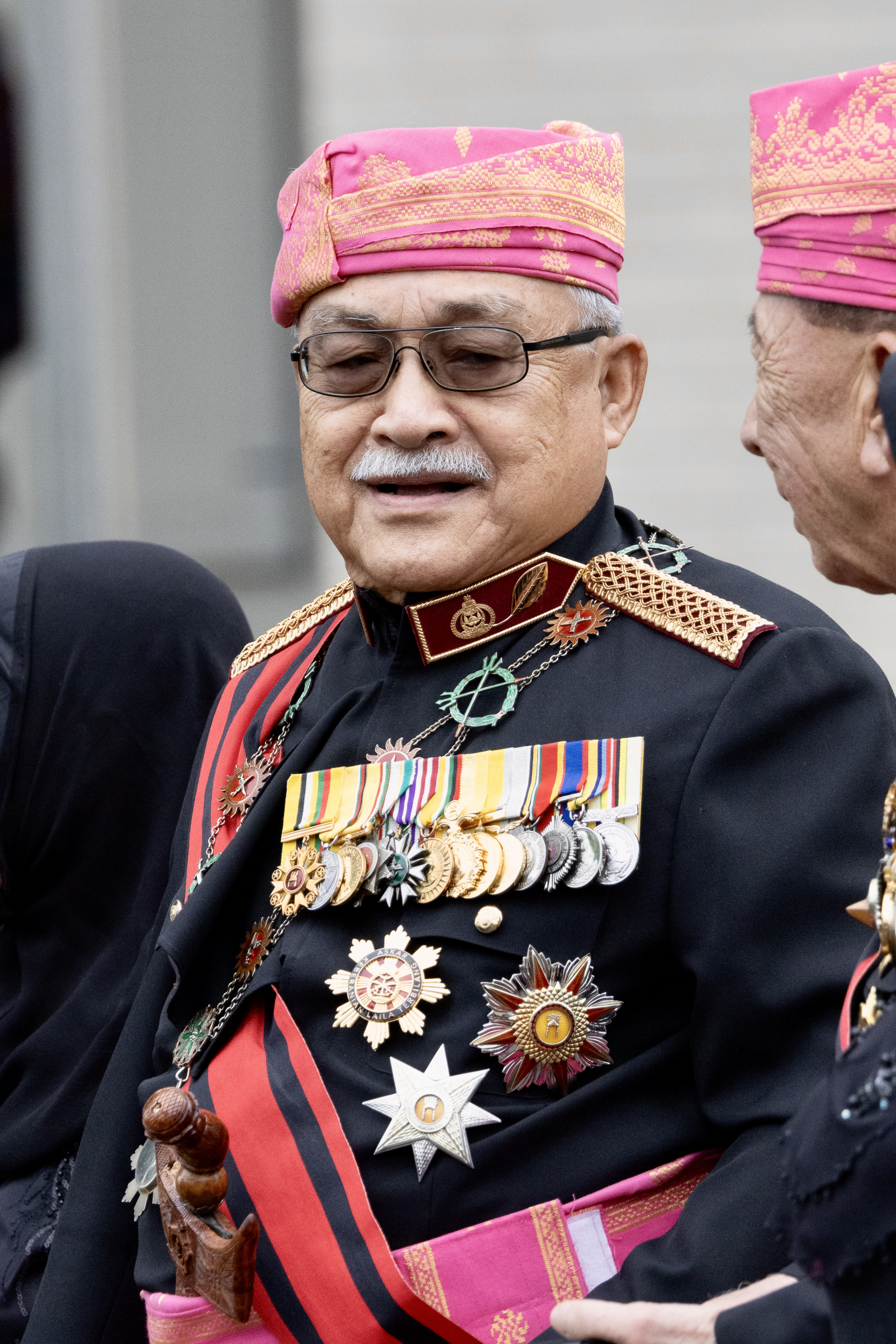
Husin Ahmad, 3rd Commander of the Royal Brunei Armed Forces

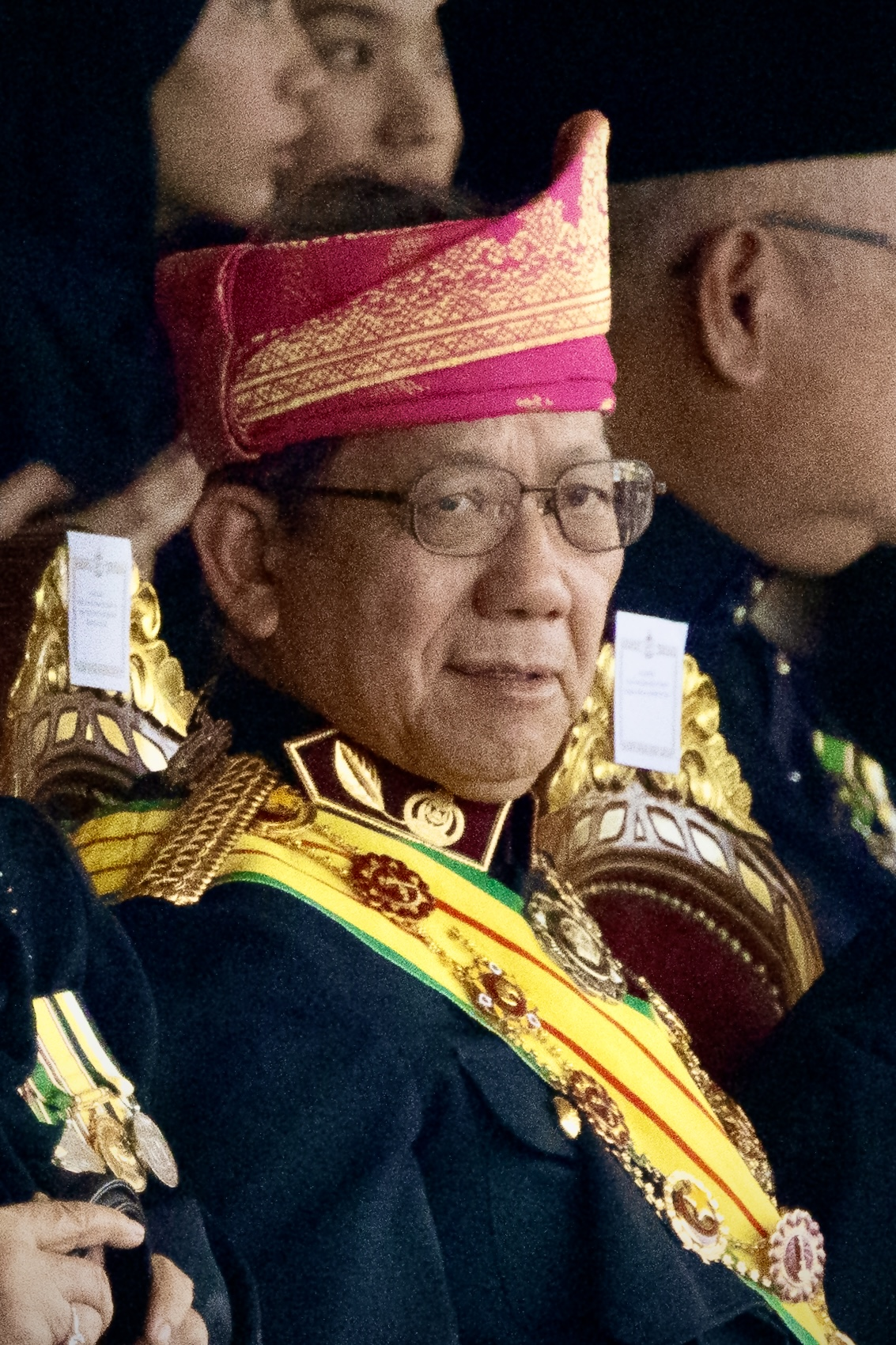
Suyoi Osman, member of Legislative Council of Brunei

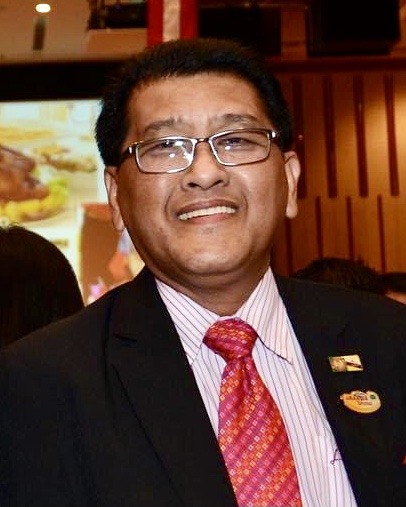
Malai Abdullah Othman, president of SMARTER

== Gallery ==
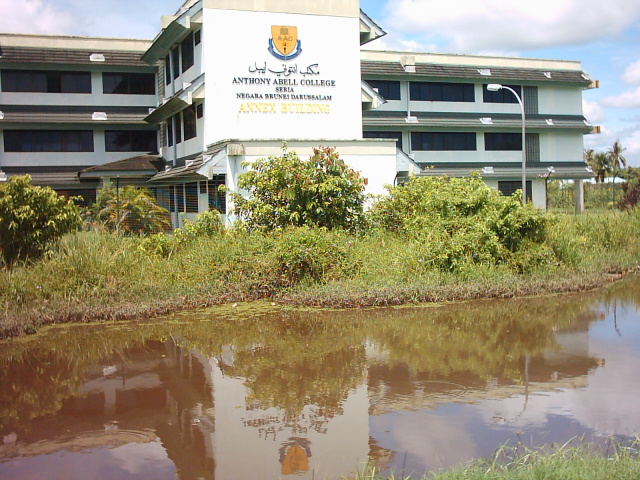
The defunct AAC Annex Building in 2007

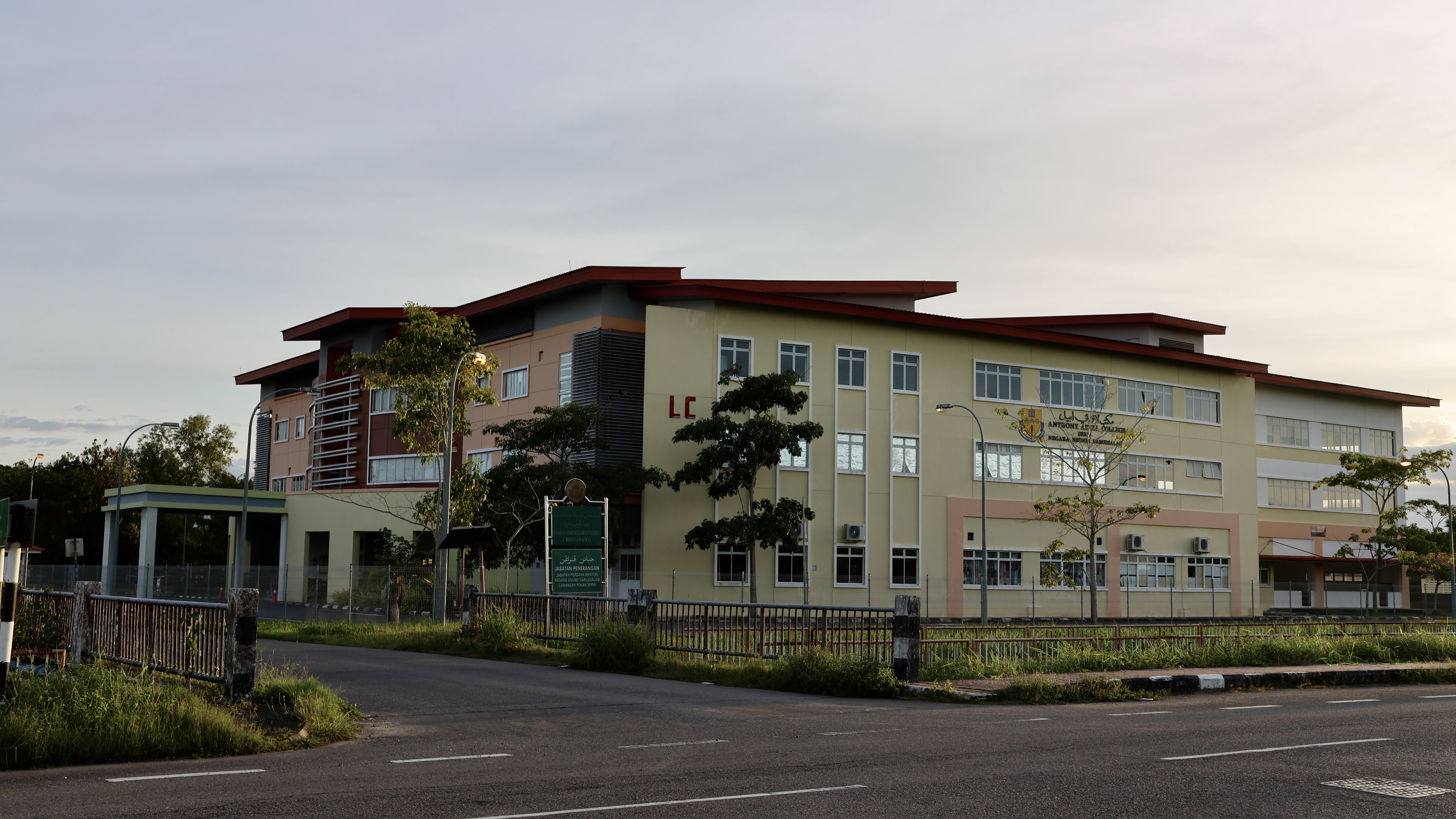
The Lower Campus in 2022

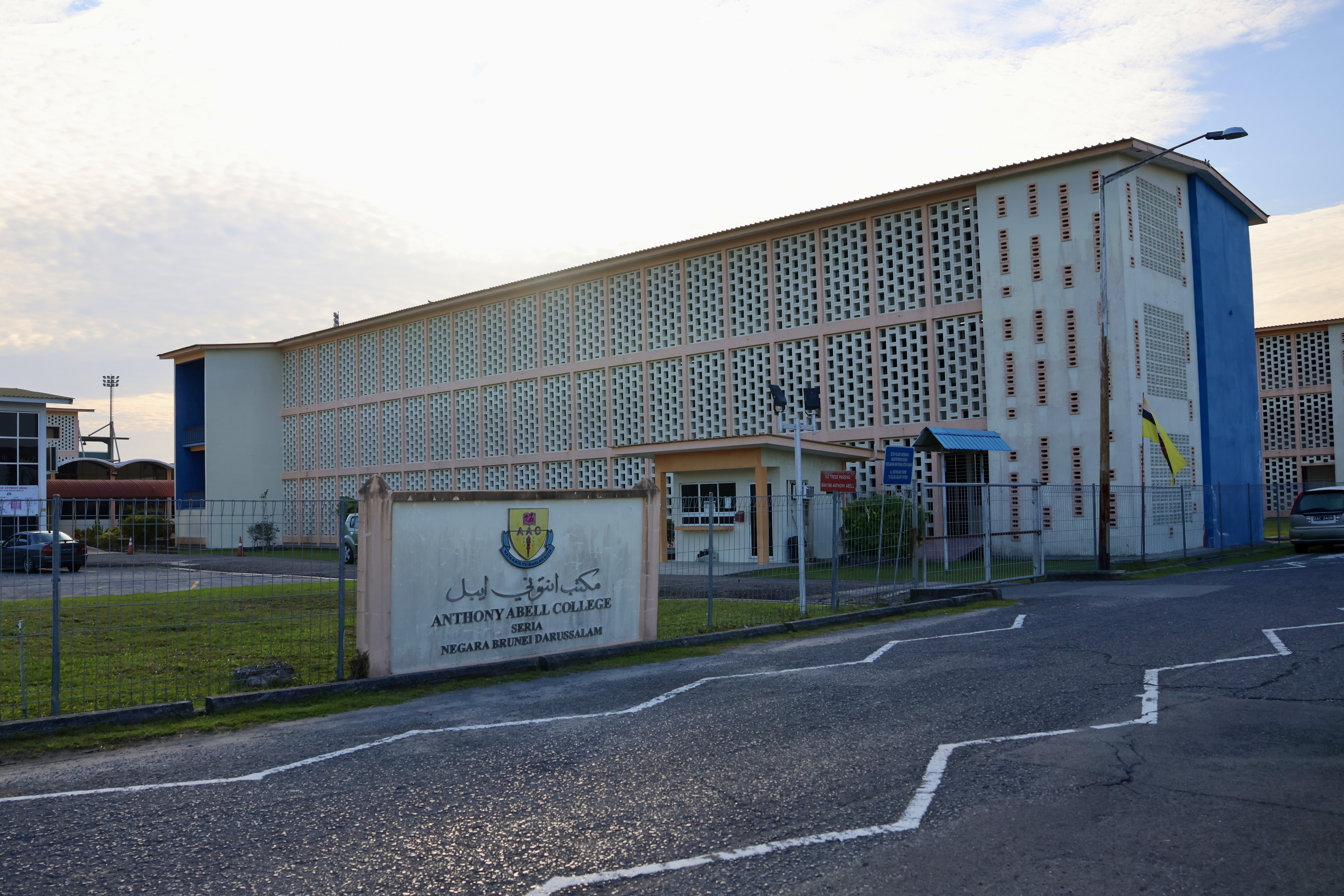
Main entrance to Upper Campus in 2024

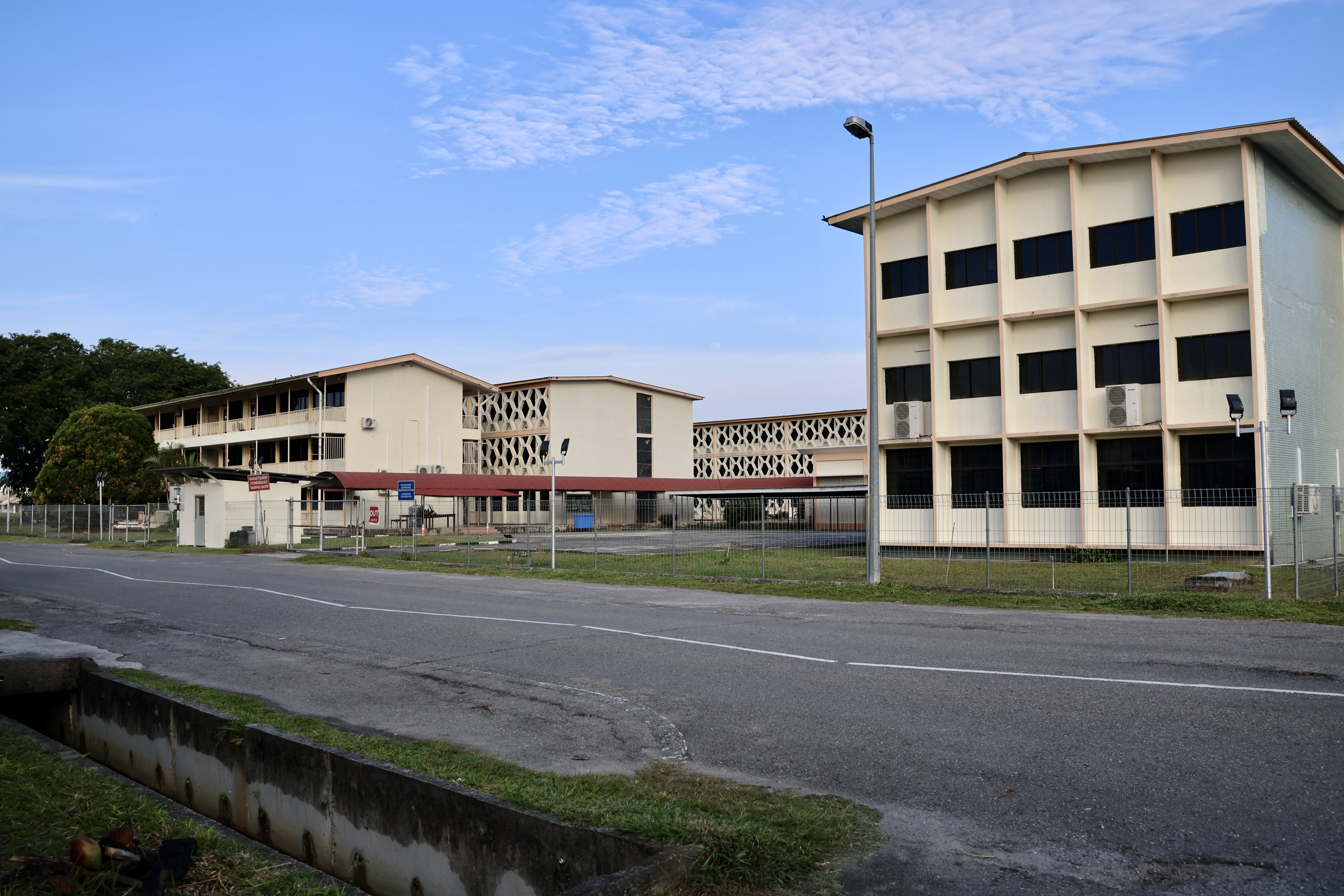
Gate D of Upper Campus in 2024

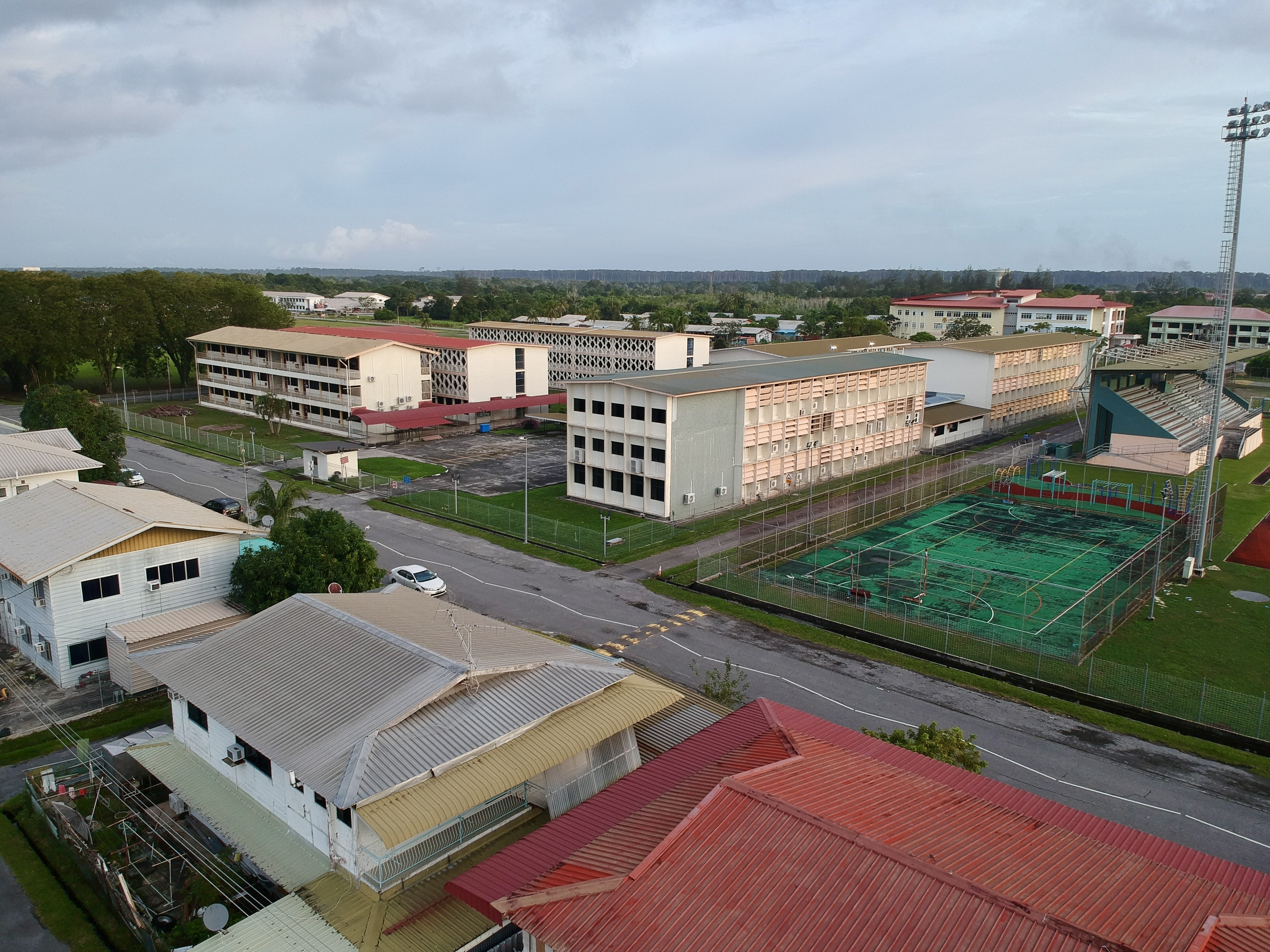
The Upper Campus in 2024

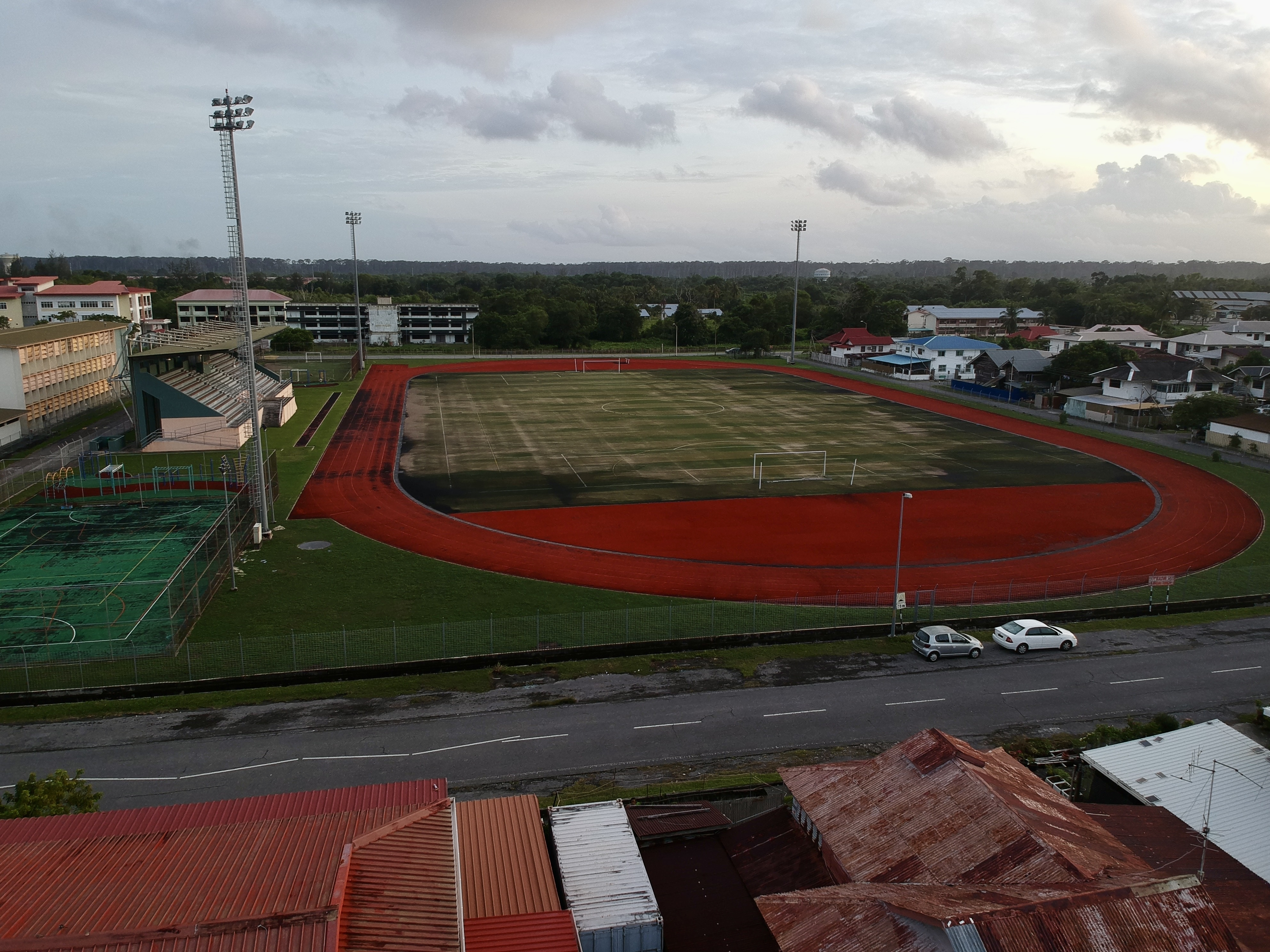
The sport complex in 2024

== See also ==
- List of secondary schools in Brunei
