= Abdullah bin Othman =

Bruneian social worker

Abdullah Othman
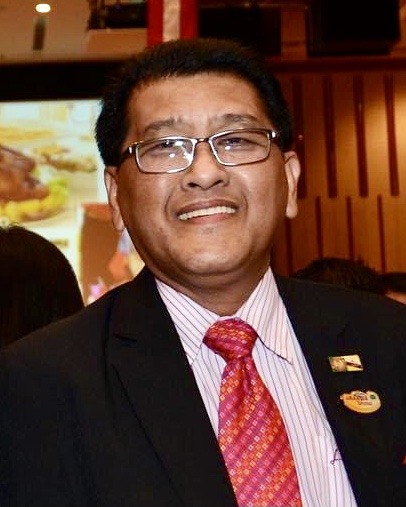
- Born: Abdullah; 1953–1954; Brunei
- Died: 30 June 2019 (aged 66); RIPAS Hospital, Bandar Seri Begawan, Brunei
- Education: Anthony Abell College
- Occupations: Social worker Activist
- Known for: President of SMARTER
- Children: 1 son and 4 daughters

Malai Abdullah bin Malai Othman (died 30 June 2019) was the president of the Society for the Management of Autism Related issues in Training, Education and Resources (SMARTER) in Brunei.

== Biography ==
Malai Abdullah studied nursing after graduating from the Anthony Abell College, Seria in 1973.

Prior to raising awareness of issues relating to autism through the SMARTER Brunei Centre, which eventually expanded to include two more centers, a charity shop, and a bakery, he began his career working for the government under the Ministry of Health (MoH). The foundation of the SMARTER Brunei Center was motivated by his autistic only son, and one of his daughters now works with the organization after receiving personal training from her late father. In 2018, he was among the ten from the ASEAN region to receive the Padma Sri civilian honour by President of India, Ram Nath Kovind, for his work towards the betterment of autistic children and adults.

== Death ==
Malai Abdullah died on the 30th of June 2019, aged 66, with his wife by his side. At the time of his death, he had breathing problems, which were later confirmed by medical staff at the Raja Isteri Pengiran Anak Saleha (RIPAS) Hospital. His wife, four daughters, one son, and 11 grandchildren remain.

== Awards ==
- Padma Shri (2018)
