= Azmi Hanifah =

Bruneian politician and engineer (born 1971)

Dato Seri Setia Azmi Hanifah PSNB SPMB
- عزمي حنيفه
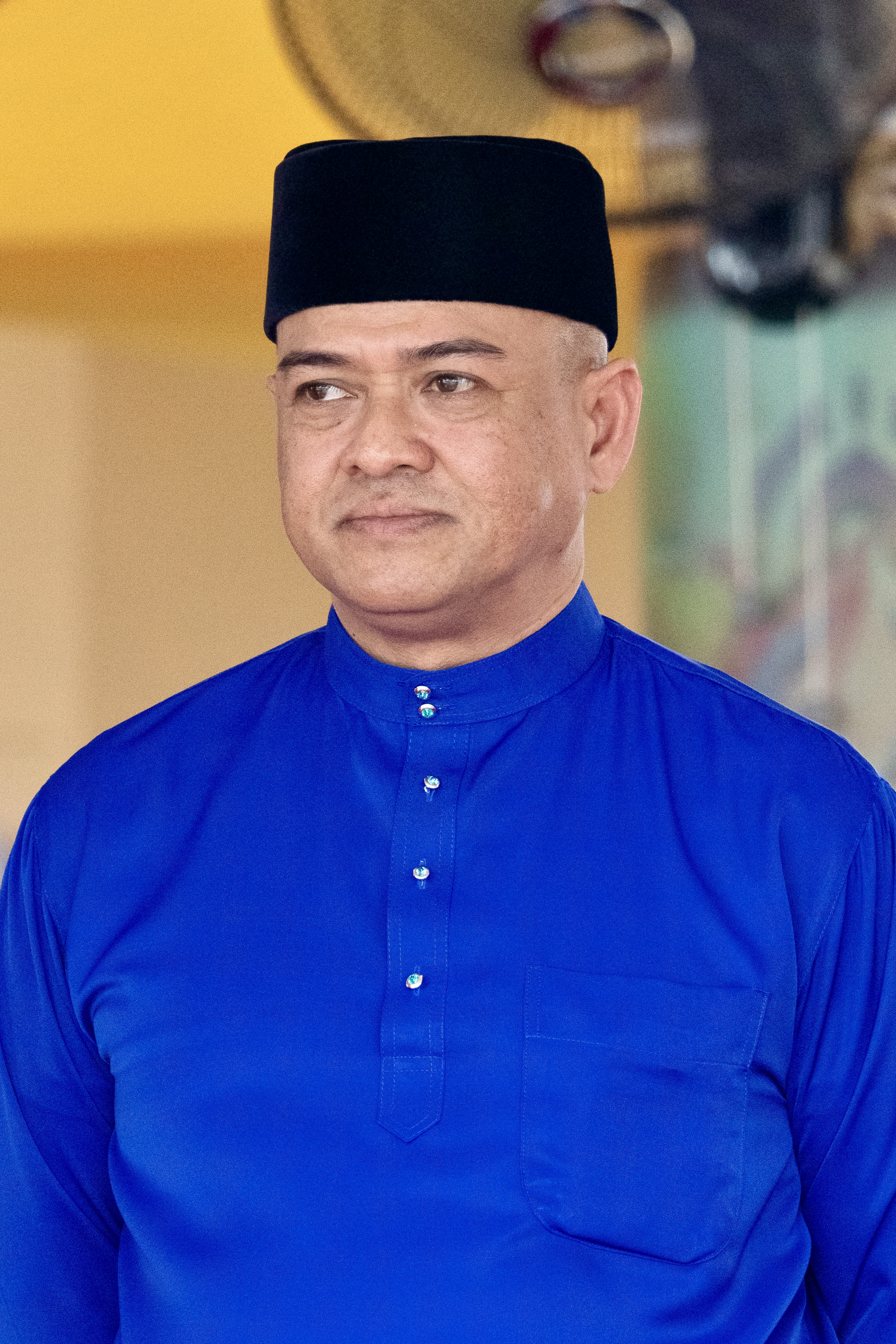
- Minister Azmi in 2024

Deputy Minister (Energy) at the Prime Minister's Office
- Incumbent
- Assumed office 24 October 2023
- Monarch: Hassanal Bolkiah
- Preceded by: Matsatejo Sokiaw

Personal details
- Born: December 1971 (age 54) Brunei
- Relations: Abdul Halim (brother); Hisham (brother); Wafi Aminuddin (nephew); Afi Aminuddin (nephew)
- Education: University of Surrey (BEng)
- Occupation: Politician; civil servant; engineer

Mohamad Azmi bin Haji Mohd Hanifah (born December 1971) is a politician and engineer from Brunei who became the incumbent Deputy Minister of Energy at the Prime Minister's Office (PMO) since 2023.

== Education and early career ==
After earning a Bachelor's degree in Chemical and Process Engineering from the University of Surrey in the United Kingdom, Mohamad Azmi began working as a Graduate Process Engineer at Brunei Shell Petroleum (BSP) in 1995. With a four-year assignment in Oman and a five-year secondment occupying key responsibilities in the Ministry of Energy and the Energy and Industry Department at the PMO, he has experience in the oil and gas industry. Additionally, he worked for a nearby oil and gas contractor firm for nearly two years.

Mohamad Azmi has worked with BSP in a variety of engineering capacities, including front-end, offshore campaign, and process engineering. Managing many engineering departments, including Corporate Front-End Engineering, West Asset Engineering, Onshore Engineering and Construction, and Asset Engineering Design, he produced projects with significant economic importance.

== Ministerial career ==
Mohamad Azmi served as the PMO's Head of Energy Services Business Development from 2013 to 2018. Before being named the deputy permanent secretary (Energy & Industry), permanent secretary (Industry), and permanent secretary (Energy & Industry), he was seconded to the government. Additionally, he was named to various Government Statutory Bodies and Government Linked Companies (GLCs) as a member. In 2020, he returned to BSP in the role of commercial director. In addition to his position as commercial director, he was named as BSP's deputy managing director in 2021. On 24 October 2023, he was appointed by Sultan Hassanal Bolkiah to the position of Deputy Minister (Energy) in the PMO, succeeding Matsatejo Sokiaw.

On 28 August, Brunei Intellectual Property Office (BruIPO), through its representative Mohamad Azmi, signed a statement of intent (SOI) with the Japan Patent Office (JPO) about the "Patent Prosecution Highway Plus (PPH+)" to initiate a new patent examination cooperation program.

During the 31st Institute of Brunei Technical Education (IBTE) convocation event on 6 December 2023, Mohamad Azmi stated that a high-quality national education system should be a top priority in order to produce a highly qualified workforce and increase economic productivity. The deputy minister asked IBTE to keep creating a high-caliber, competitive, and pertinent TVET education program in keeping with Brunei Vision 2035. In order to guarantee that the curriculum remains relevant to both present and future business demands, he emphasised the institution's dedication to maintaining ties with the corporate and local sectors.

== Honours ==
Mohamad Azmi has earned the following honours;

- Grand Commander of the Order of Setia Negara Brunei (PSNB) – Dato Seri Setia (15 July 2026)
- Grand Commander of the Order of Seri Paduka Mahkota Brunei (SPMB) – Dato Seri Paduka (15 July 2024)

Political offices
Preceded by Matsatejo Sokiaw	Deputy Minister of Energy at the Prime Minister's Office; 24 October 2023 – present	Succeeded by Incumbent
