= Southampton College =

Southampton city College
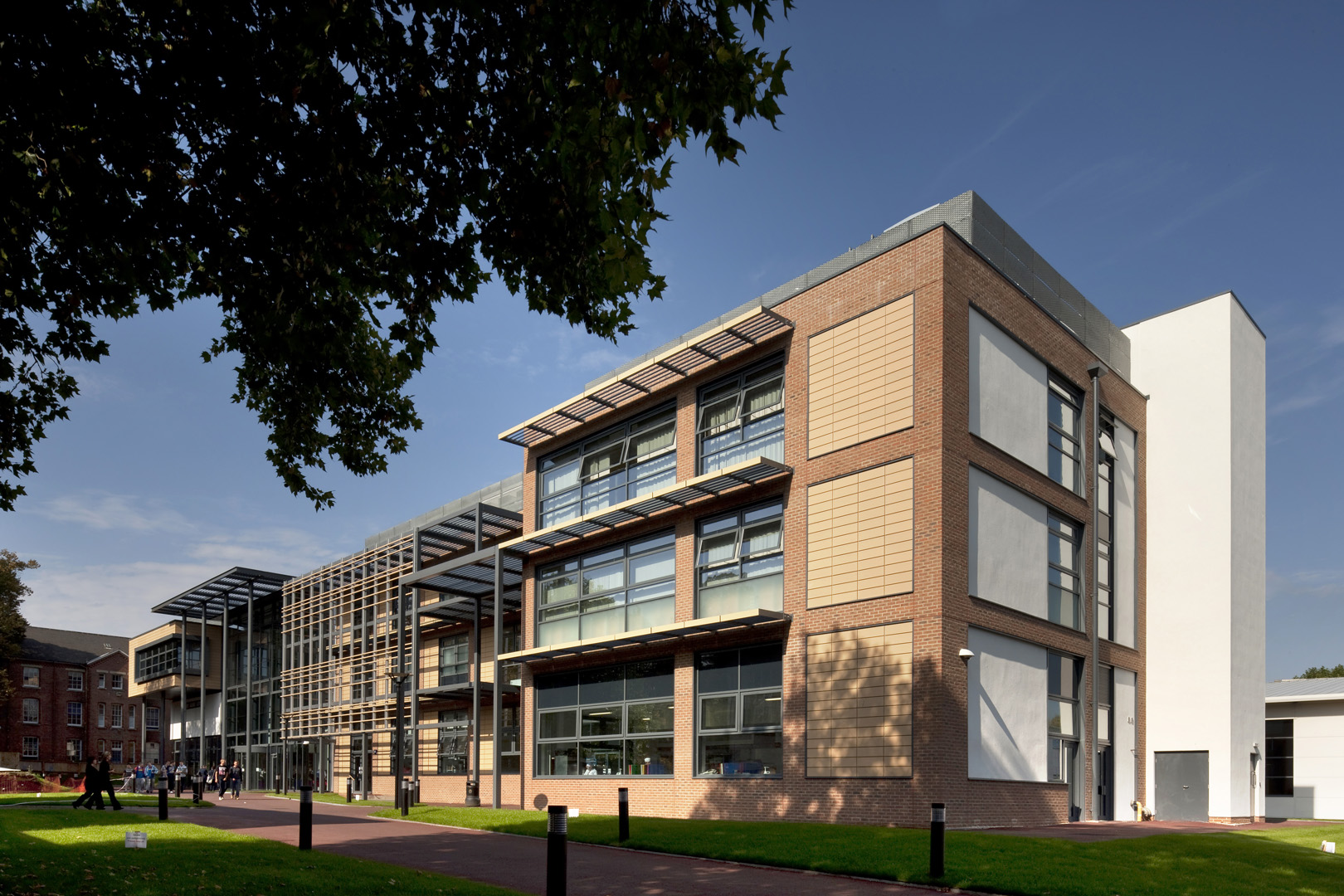

Location
- St Mary Street; Southampton, Hampshire, SO14 1AR; England; 50.90343°N 1.39512°W

Information
- Type: Further education college
- Established: 1952
- Local authority: Southampton
- Department for Education URN: 130696 Tables
- Gender: Coeducational
- Age: 16+
- Website: https://www.southampton-city.ac.uk

Southampton city College, is a general further education college located in Southampton, Hampshire, England. There has been a school of some kind on the site since the 1930s, but the current institution originated with the establishment of a technical college in 1952. Much of the current campus was constructed during a period of redevelopment from 2001 to 2012. In 2022 the College celebrated its 70th anniversary.

In 2023 it merged with Eastleigh and Fareham colleges to form the South Hampshire College Group (SHCG). The name "Southampton College" is today applied to the current South Hampshire College Group campus.

The college offers various study programmes for young people and adults as part of the SHCG, including professional, technical and creative courses as well as apprenticeships. It specialises in marine, engineering, early years, hospitality, digital and the creative arts. The Warsash Maritime School was also located on site from 2017 to 2024.

== Campuses ==
- St Mary Street Campus (50.9034°N 1.3954°W), located in the district of the same name, near Southampton City Centre.
- Marine Technology Centre, Woolston (50.9004°N 1.3820°W)

== History ==
Several of the buildings on the campus pre-date the college. The oldest is Bencraft House, a Georgian house built around 1800. It is named after Russell Bencraft, who was born in the house when his father was the medical officer for the workhouse. The Victorian frontage dates back to the old St. Mary workhouse (1866); earlier almshouses existed on the site as far back as the 17th century.

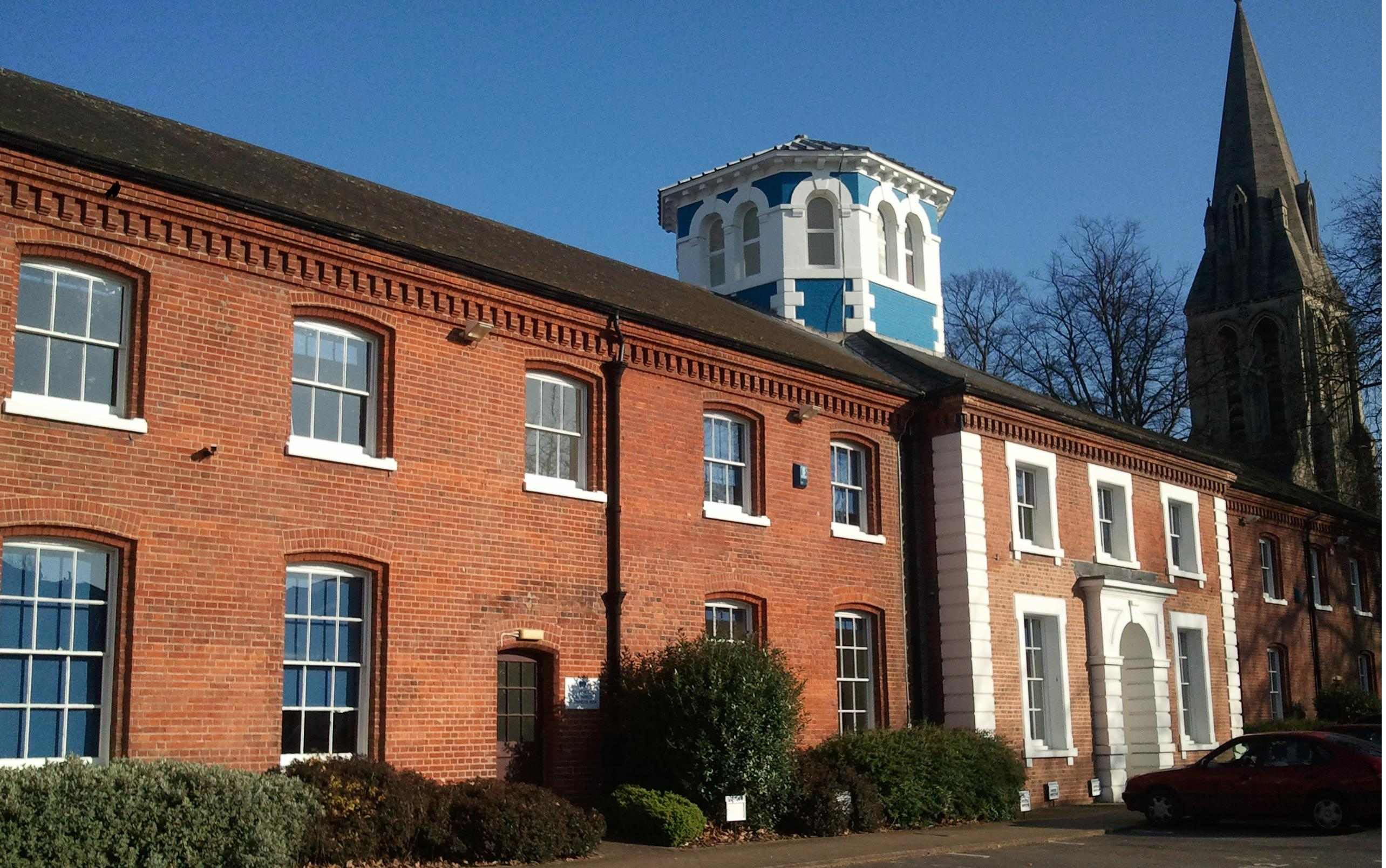
Old Victorian Workhouse frontage

=== Origins (1930-2000) ===
The Deanery building was built as a school in the 1930s, and remained part of the campus area until it was demolished in the 2000s. Under the leadership of Frank West, the junior school saw substantial growth. In 1948 the Education Authority took over the old St Mary Institution to provide a more permanent home for the Technical School. Following substantial building works and consolidation of a number of local school sites, it was opened as the Technical College in June 1952. In 1960 work began on the construction of Southampton College of Technology and the Technical College became part of this organisation. In 1969, it became a separate entity and as such adopted the name Southampton Technical College. On 2 April 1995, it changed its name again to Southampton City College.

In 1999, the college received £80,000 in funding for a new theatre on campus. The new venue was used by the performing arts programme. Changes to the UCAS rules in 2000 allowed City College to gain membership, along with other local colleges. While the college did not offer degrees; it did offer at least one HND or HNC, which meant that it was eligible for membership. This meant that City College was thereafter eligible to compete with other colleges and universities nationally for prospective students.

=== Industrial disputes (2001-2008) ===
The college faced financial difficulties in the early 2000s, caused by poor student retention. The college warned staff in May 2001 that job cuts may be necessary. Industrial action took place that September. The financial situation was improving by early 2002, but City College decided not to enact a pay rise that was recommended by the Association of Colleges. It was the only college in the south of England not to adopt the pay rise. Strikes continued intermittently throughout the year, with a change to the tutoring system in December 2002 causing further action. A pay agreement was eventually reached, but failure by the college to implement the second stage of the agreement resulted in further strikes in 2004, conducted during an Ofsted inspection. Further strikes were held over pay in 2005 and again in 2008.

=== Redevelopment (2002 to 2012) ===
Beginning in 2002, the campus underwent extensive redevelopment as part of a £30 million programme. The first stage was completed in September 2004, which included the completion of a new reception and information & advice centre, new teaching block with learning centres for IT, Art & Design, Health & Social Care and Childcare. The second phase was completed in the summer of 2005 and involved the development of a new technology building which included facilities for motor vehicle, brickwork and construction trades.

A portion of the campus, including the 1930s Deanery building was sold to make way for housing as part of an urban redevelopment programme for the area.

In September 2009 the Watts block was redeveloped to provide learning facilities for 3D creative design, engineering, professional construction and electrical installation. This block also housed learning centres and a lecture theatre.

In September 2010, City College opened two new blocks, forming the completion phase of the campus redevelopment project. 'The hub' included a new theatre, TV and radio studios, a business training suite, a learning centre, a theatre bar and a fitness suite. The adjoining Aspire building housed new facilities for catering, hair and beauty, together with seminar rooms and learning centres. These work-based training facilities were opened to the public as the "Aspire" restaurant and "Kudos" Hair and Beauty Salons.

In 2012 City College Southampton was shortlisted for a Times Educational Supplement (TES) FE award in elearning for the work done in Citybit, the Virtual Learning Environment.

=== Financial troubles and merger (2012–2023) ===
City College was left with significant debt after the redevelopment concluded, with 6 million pounds of debt from a loan taken in 2009.

The college leased the Austen building to the Warsash Maritime School and relocated all the facilities in it to other parts of the campus. Warsash relocated again to Solent University's East Park Terrace in 2024.

City College explored mergers with a number of other education providers in the area to continue to provide further education courses to Southampton in a sustainable way. Without a merger, the college was at risk of closure. The FE National Area Review process recommended a merger with Solent University in 2016, but this was later rejected by the Department for Education in 2018. The college rapidly made a new proposal for a merger with Eastleigh College in June 2018 but funding was pulled by the government days before it was due to be completed.

A third attempt at a merger was made with Itchen Sixth Form in September 2020, but this too was rejected on grounds of financial viability. In 2022 a report by the Further Education commissioner repeated that the college needed to merge.

The college merged a year later with Fareham and Eastleigh colleges to form the South Hampshire College Group (SHCG) in 2023. The legal entity that was City College Southampton ended in 2023 with the merger.

=== Southampton College in South Hampshire College Group (2023- present) ===
Following the merger the campus name was changed to Southampton College and it benefitted from a share of a £12 million pound investment project in 2024 into SGHC, which planned to further develop the facilities for motor vehicle, engineering and marine skills.

On 2 April 2025 Southampton city college became 30 years old and South Hampshire College Group, including Southampton College had a positive inspection for the newly merged group of 3 colleges, with all inspected areas assessed as Good.

== Notable alumni ==
- Norsiah Abdul Gapar, Bruneian writer
- Paul Ainsworth, English chef, restaurant and hotel owner
- Craig David, English singer and musician
- Mohd Rashid Hasnon, Malaysian politician
