= Mat Suny =

Bruneian politician

Dato Seri Setia Mat Suny PSNB DPMB PJK
- مت سوني
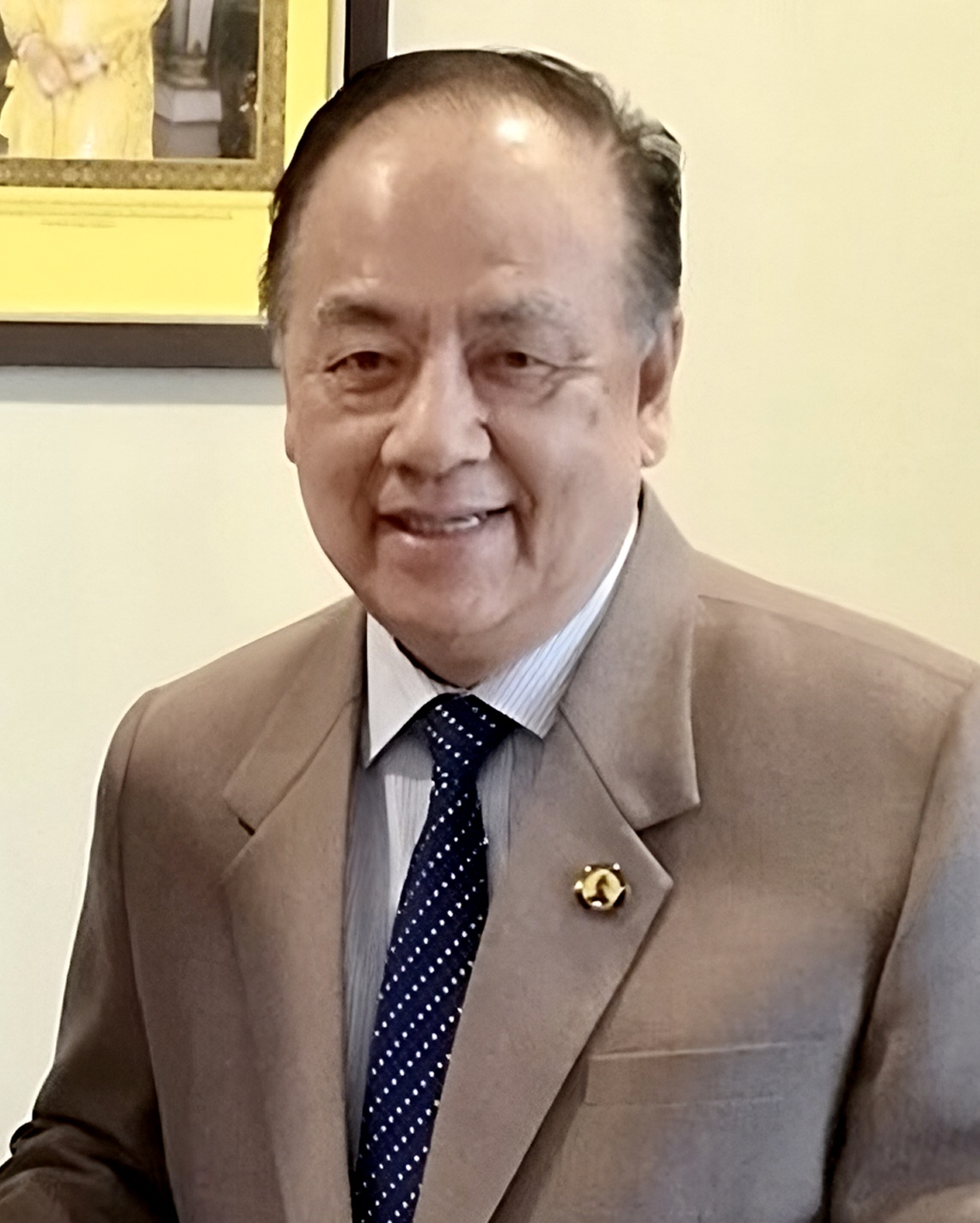
- Mat Suny in 2019

4th Minister of Energy
- In office 30 January 2018 – 21 May 2022
- Monarch: Hassanal Bolkiah
- Deputy: Matsatejo Sokiaw
- Preceded by: Yasmin Umar
- Succeeded by: Office abolished
Other positions
2nd Deputy Minister of Development
In office 24 May 2005 – 20 May 2010
Minister	Abdullah Bakar
Preceded by	Selamat Munap
Succeeded by	Ali Apong

Personal details
- Profession: Politician; engineer

Mat Suny bin Mohammad Hussein is a Bruneian politician who formerly held the position of Deputy Minister of Development from 2005 to 2010, and Minister of Energy from 2018 to 2022. Notably, he is also the deputy chairman of Universiti Teknologi Brunei (UTB).

== Early career ==
Before being assigned to the civil service, Mat Suny started working for Shell in 1974 as a project engineer for Brunei Shell, Sarawak Shell, and Sabah Shell's offshore constructions in the South China Sea. The Fairley-4 Complex, which required the installation and connection of drilling and gas platforms as well as housing modules, was the largest project he oversaw. He had several positions abroad, including Assistant Area Coordinator for East Australasia located in London and The Hague, where he was in charge of exploration and production, concession and production-sharing agreements, and foreign affairs.

He joined Konsultan MWH as a consultant and partner after leaving Shell. He served as the Deputy MD/Director of Corporate Affairs at Brunei Shell Petroleum and the MD of Brunei Shell Marketing at Shell Petroleum Company, London, from 1992 and 2002. He was solely responsible for all corporate matters, including government relations, as well as human resources for the business. He started his engineering career with a London consultancy before returning to Brunei.

== Minister of Energy ==
For his ministerial career, he was first appointed as the Deputy Minister of Development on 24 May 2005, a position he would hold until 20 May 2010. During a cabinet reshuffle on 30 January 2018, he was reappointed as the 4th Minister of Energy, succeeding Yasmin Umar.

On 10 March 2019, Mat Suny stated that all parties at all levels of society, including the grassroots level, must show unwavering commitment, high dedication, and solidarity to handle the national agenda related to the economy, industry, unemployment, and well-being of the country's people. The Whole of Nation strategy has received attention in the process of ensuring the success of the national development plan. The goal, according to his motion of vote of appreciation, is to guarantee that the peace, prosperity, and well-being attained thus far will endure. This covers a wide range of complex concerns.

=== Youth development ===
On 4 August 2019, at the closing ceremony of the 7th Green Leaders Camp, he asserted that Brunei Darussalam's young are already setting the pace for a sustainable future. Youth entrepreneurs are taking advantage of opportunities for climate mitigation and adaptation, and there are an increasing number of social companies and NGOs focused on climate challenges. Additionally, he said that as the ministry looks to the future, it must balance economic growth with environmental development.

=== Remewable energy ===
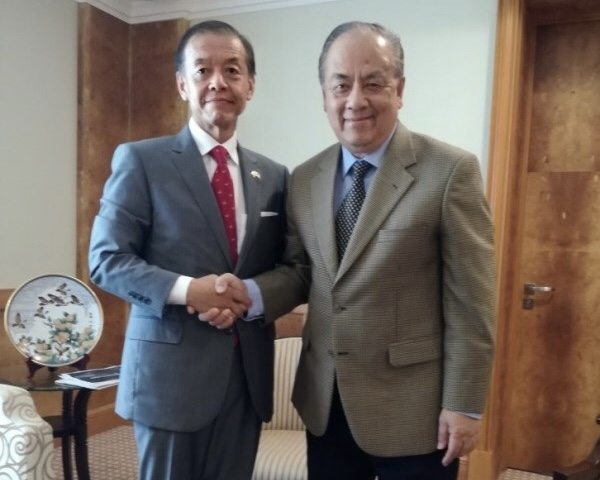
Japan and Brunei reaffirmed their friendly bilateral relationship, and they also discussed potential areas of collaboration that might help diverse Brunei's economy

He gave the opening remarks at the ASEAN Energy Business Forum (AEBF) 2021, which was held virtually from 14 to 16 September, highlighting the necessity of accelerating the energy transition in the Southeast Asian region to meet the two key goals by 2025: first, the incorporation of 23% renewable energy in the ASEAN energy mix, and second, the reduction of 32% in energy intensity as outlined in Phase II of the ASEAN Plan. The Bandar Seri Begawan Joint Declaration of the 39th ASEAN Ministers on Energy on Energy Security and Energy Transition, which reaffirms ASEAN Member States' shared commitment and collective responsibility in the pursuit of energy security and energy transitions, was adopted at the 39th ASEAN Ministers on Energy Meeting, which was virtually hosted by Brunei Darussalam on 15 September 2021. Nguyen Hong Dien, Minister of Industry and Trade of Vietnam, headed the delegation. The chairperson of AMEM 2021 has been transferred to Mat Suny, according to a statement made by Nguyen Hong Dien at the meeting's opening remarks on 15th.

Brunei stated in 2014 that it intended to get just 10% of its energy from renewable sources by the year 2035. However, Mat Suny asserted that his nation has treble that figure when in Singapore in 2021. According to him, Brunei's new energy security plan calls for obtaining 30% of its electricity from renewable sources by 2035. He proposed that Brunei will achieve its goals for renewable energy by "enhancing private sector participation through public private partnership in the financing and undertaking of renewable energy development projects." He was outlining a cooperative plan that had been under development for some years.

We are enhancing private sector participation through public private partnership in the financing and undertaking of renewable energy development projects in the country.

— Dato Seri Setia Awang Haji Mat Suny bin Awang Haji Mohd Hussein, Reuters

=== Oil and gas production ===
Following the finding of 42 million barrels of oil in 2022, Brunei expects to increase production of both oil and gas, according to Mat Suny. Notably, the nation is counting on new discoveries to stop an anticipated fall in upstream supply. The site of the upstream finding was kept a secret by him. It's possible that he was alluding to a deepwater discovery made by Shell (LSE:RDSA) in Block CA-1 during Q2 2021 with its Jagus SubThrust-1X exploration well. The operator and its associates, Murphy Oil and Petronas, have not yet made any discoveries regarding the find public. According to The Scoop earlier this month, he stated that further exploration wells will be drilled offshore this year and that more blocks will be made available in an effort to entice new operators to Brunei.

=== Abolishment of office ===
It was stated that Sultan Hassanal Bolkiah has ordered that the Ministry of Energy be abolished and that the Department of Energy be established to handle the Ministry of Energy's responsibilities. With effect from 21 May 2022, Mat Suny will no longer hold the position of Minister of Energy. As a result, Dato Matsatejo Sokiaw is appointed Deputy Minister of the Department of Energy in the Prime Minister's Office (PMO) with effect from the same day.

== Personal life ==
Mat Suny is married and have three children. Director of Anti-Corruption Bureau (ACB) Datin Elinda binti C.A. Mohammad's brother-in-law is him.

== Honours ==
Mat Suny has earned the following honours;

- Order of Setia Negara Brunei First Class (PSNB) – Dato Seri Setia (15 July 2018)
- Order of Seri Paduka Mahkota Brunei Second Class (DPMB) – Dato Paduka
- Meritorious Service Medal (PJK)

Political offices
Preceded by Yasmin Umar	4th Minister of Energy; 30 January 2018 – 21 May 2022	Succeeded by Office abolished
Preceded by Selamat Munap	2nd Deputy Minister of Development; 24 May 2005 – 20 May 2010	Succeeded by Ali Apong
