= Yasmin Umar =

Bruneian military officer and politician (born 1956)

Yang Dimuliakan Pehin Datu Singamanteri Colonel (Retired) Dato Seri Setia Yasmin Umar PSNB SPMB PHBS
- ياسمين عمر
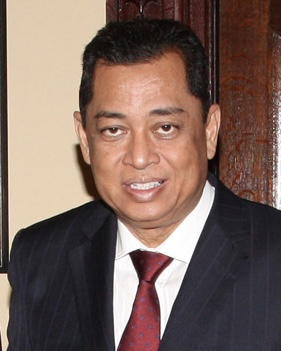
- Yasmin in 2013

3rd Minister of Energy and Industry
- In office 29 May 2010 – 30 January 2018
- Monarch: Hassanal Bolkiah
- Preceded by: Mohammad Daud
- Succeeded by: Mat Suny

2nd Deputy Minister of Defence
- In office 24 May 2005 – 29 May 2010
- Minister: Hassanal Bolkiah
- Preceded by: Pengiran Ibnu Basit
- Succeeded by: Mustappa Sirat

Personal details
- Born: 23 April 1956 (age 70) Brunei
- Spouse: Noryasimah Abdullah (m. 1983)
- Education: Anthony Abell College
- Alma mater: University of Wales (BSc); Loughborough University (MSc)
- Occupation: Military officer; politician

Military service
- Branch/service: Royal Brunei Navy
- Years of service: 1981–2003
- Rank: Colonel
- Unit: First Flotilla, RBMR

Mohammad Yasmin bin Haji Umar (born 23 April 1956) is a Bruneian aristocrat, politician, and retired military officer who served as minister of energy from 2010 to 2018 and deputy minister of defence from 2005 to 2010.

== Early life and education ==
Mohammad Yasmin bin Haji Umar, born in Brunei on 23 April 1956, pursued his early education at Anthony Abell College in Seria. On 12 July 1979, he earned a Bachelor of Science (Hons) degree in electronics from the University of Wales in the United Kingdom. Continuing his academic journey, he enrolled at the University of Loughborough, also in the UK, where he specialised in digital communication systems. On 1 December 1981, he was awarded a Master of Science degree by the faculty of electrical and electronic engineering.

== Military career ==
Yasmin began his career in the Royal Brunei Malay Regiment (RBMR) as a commissioned officer, receiving a promotion to lieutenant on 9 November 1981. On 25 June 1986, he was awarded the certified chartered engineer insignia by the Institution of Chartered Engineers. Throughout his career, he participated in numerous courses, seminars, and workshops in the United Kingdom, Australia, Singapore, Japan, and the United States. In 1987, he attended the 22nd army staff course, division 1, at the Royal Military College of Science in the United Kingdom.

He held various roles in policy, corporate management, logistics, and strategy. He began as an engineering officer, initially assigned to the First Flotilla of the RBMR, now known as the Royal Brunei Navy, where he served as a weapons engineering officer. On 1 April 1988, he was appointed senior engineering officer, leading the Naval Engineering Department.

== Political career ==
=== Ministry of Defence ===
Subsequently, on 14 September 1990, Yasmin became head of research in the defence minister's office and the directorate of strategic planning (DMO/DSP). In 1991, he participated in the Defence Research Fellow Exchange Programme at the National Institute of Defence Studies in Japan. In 1992, Yasmin took on the role of staff officer grade 1 maintenance at the directorate of logistics, where he developed maintenance guidelines for armed forces equipment. On 2 May 1994, he returned to the DMO/DSP as a staff officer grade 1. He was appointed director of intelligence and security on 14 July 1995, a position he held until December 1998. He attended the Australian Defence College in Canberra in 1999. He was appointed as the director of DMO/DSP on 4 January 1999.

Yasmin was appointed as one of three newly appointed permanent secretaries in Brunei, assuming a role at the Ministry of Defence on 24 January 2003, where he oversaw policy and administration. This appointment was later confirmed when Sultan Hassanal Bolkiah received the appointees at Istana Nurul Iman on 6 February that same year. Yasmin was officially appointed to the Legislative Council by the sultan on 6 September 2004.

=== Deputy Minister of Defence ===
On 24 May 2005, Yasmin was appointed as the deputy minister of defence under the sultan's order as part of a cabinet reshuffle.

On 2 March 2007, Yasmin emphasised the importance of human resources in strengthening Brunei's defence readiness. During the 23rd National Day celebration, he reiterated the sultan's message that the country's future progress, both regionally and internationally, relies on effectively managing its human resources to produce specialists and intellectuals. Yasmin noted that without a skilled and knowledgeable workforce, Brunei would struggle to compete with more advanced nations. On 5 December 2007, Yasmin was present at the Langkawi International Maritime and Aerospace Exhibition, where a memorandum of understanding (MOU) was signed between World Aerospace (M) and Royal Brunei Technical Services for the management of BRIDEX 2009.

=== Minister of Energy ===
Chuck Hagel and Yasmin at the Empire Hotel and Country Club in 2013

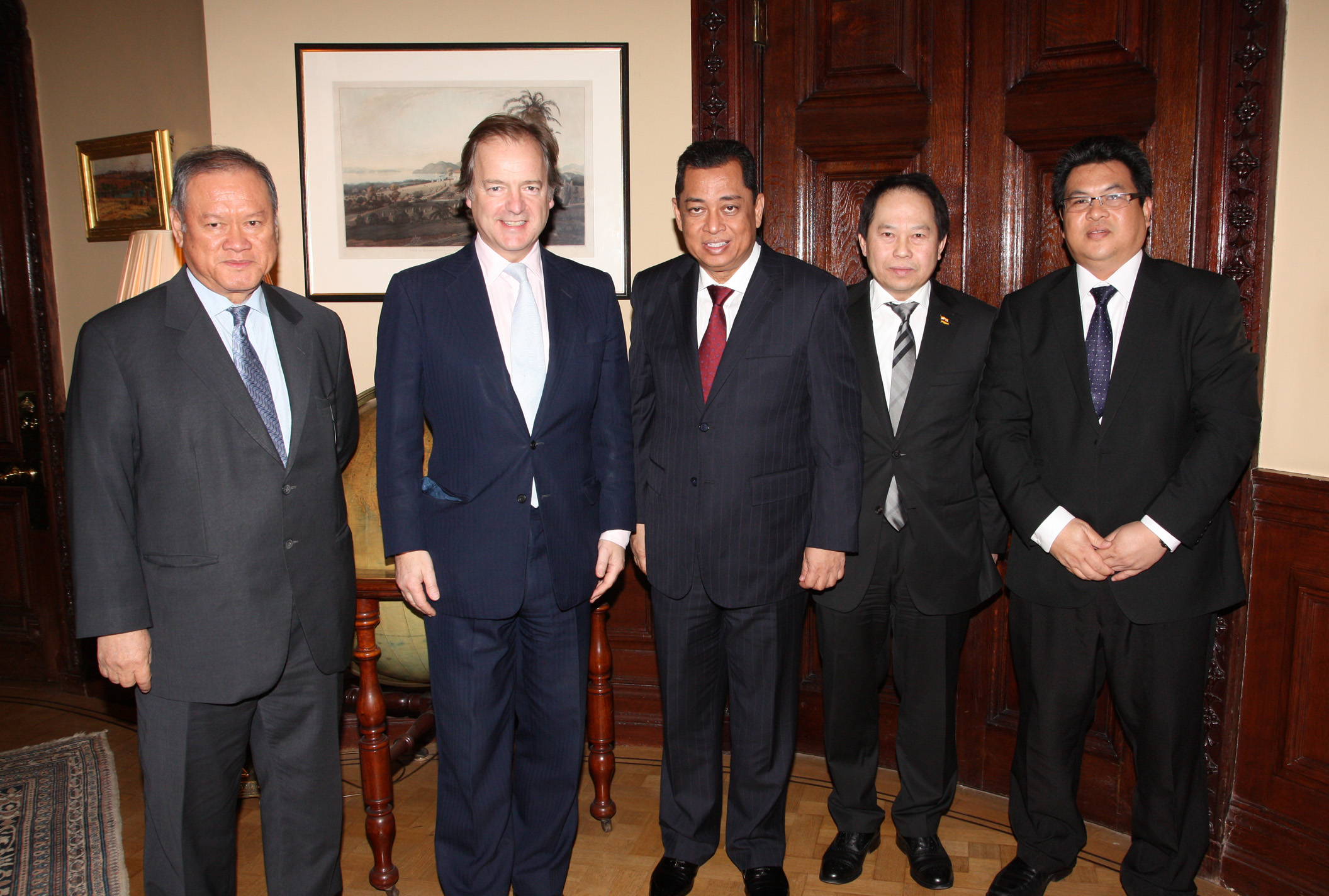
Lim Jock Seng, Hugo Swire, Yasmin, and Aziyan Abdullah at a meeting in London, 2013

As part of a cabinet reshuffle, Yasmin was appointed minister of energy at the Prime Minister's Office (PMO) on 29 May 2010. Shortly after his appointment, on 2 November 2011, Yasmin became one of the respondents in a legal case filed by Captain (Retired) Huraizah Duraman, who alleged wrongful dismissal from the Royal Brunei Armed Forces (RBAF). Yasmin, along with other defendants, was accused of recommending or conspiring to cause Huraizah's discharge from the RBAF. However, the court ruled that the dismissal was solely a result of the sultan's prerogative power, which could not be influenced or questioned by the respondents. Additionally, Yasmin and the other defendants were protected by constitutional immunity, shielding them from legal action regarding their actions in this matter. Ultimately, the court dismissed the case, concluding that Yasmin’s involvement did not lead to the plaintiff's dismissal.

In 2011, Yasmin criticised Brunei Shell Petroleum (BSP) for allowing large businesses to dominate energy contracts, which he believed hindered the growth of small and medium-sized enterprises (SMEs). He called for greater transparency and faster vendor registration to support SMEs, advocating for a more inclusive approach to contract allocation in the energy sector. His remarks aimed to foster a more equitable environment for SMEs in Brunei's energy industry. Following this, on 1 February 2012, the Energy Department at the PMO, with the Sultan's approval, released Directive No. 2–Local Business Development (LBD) Framework. Yasmin hoped this would lead to spin-offs, as Brunei Shell Joint Venture and TotalEnergies planned to invest B$5–6 billion over the next two years.

=== Minister of Energy and Industry ===
On 22 October 2015, Yasmin was appointed minister of energy and industry in the PMO as part of a wider cabinet reshuffle, which saw several top officials reassigned to new roles. In his new position, Yasmin took charge of Brunei's increasingly important energy sector, overseeing the nation's energy policies and fostering the growth of the oil and gas industry, crucial to the country's economic development.

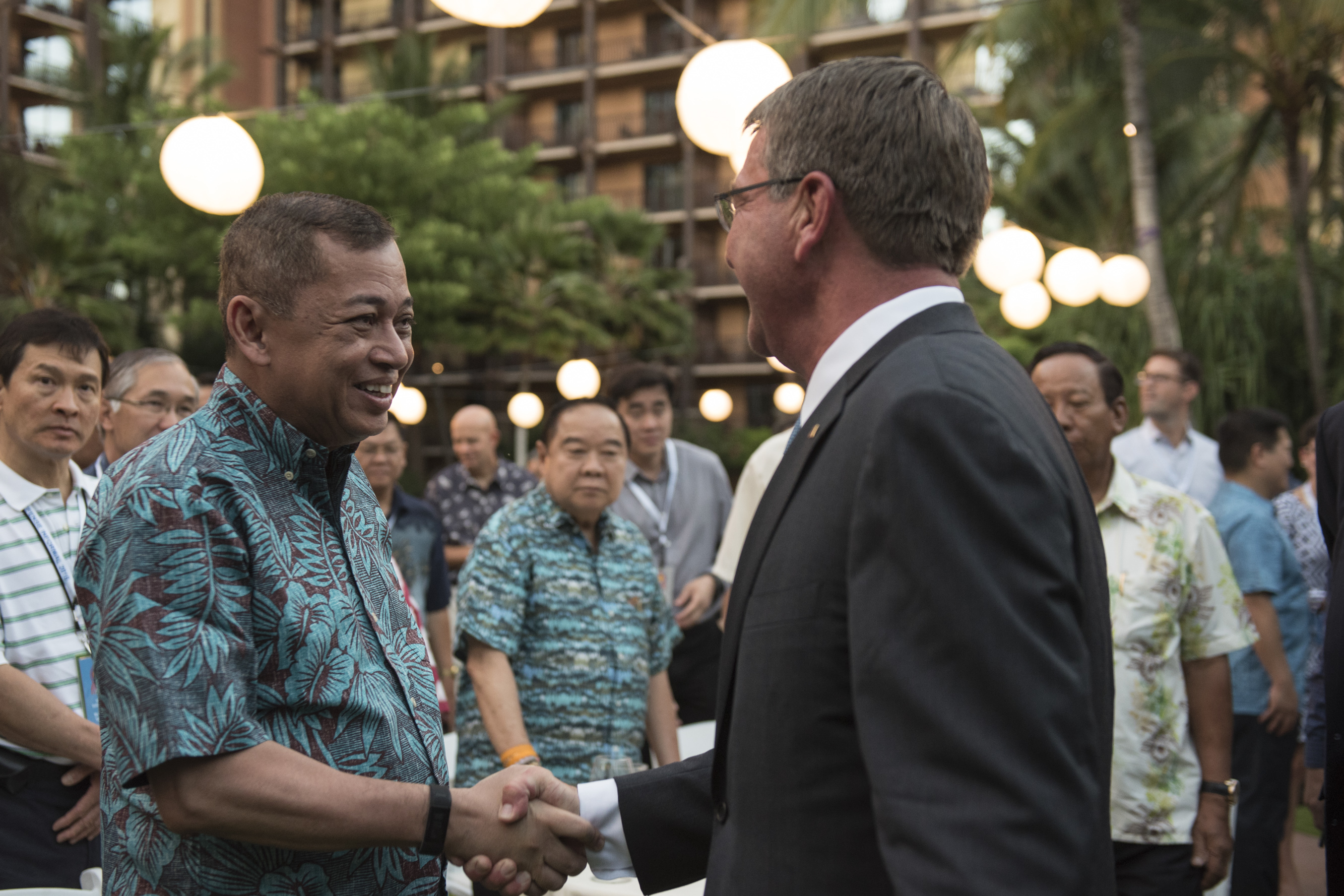
Yasmin meeting Ash Carter at Kapolei in 2016

On 3 November 2016, Yasmin reaffirmed Brunei's commitment to a zero-tolerance policy towards corruption. He stressed that corruption could undermine the country’s progress by depriving citizens of essential opportunities, such as job creation. Yasmin also warned international companies operating in Brunei against interfering with corruption investigations, describing corruption as a destructive force akin to a disease that could erode the social fabric if not addressed. He underscored the need for a workforce that aligns with Brunei's principles of Melayu Islam Beraja, emphasising the importance of integrity in public and private sectors.

On 7 May 2017, Yasmin met with Saudi Arabia's Ministry of Energy, Industry and Mineral Resources, Khalid A. Al-Falih, to discuss strengthening Brunei–Saudi relations. The two discussed potential Saudi investments in Brunei's ammonia and urea projects, as well as opportunities in the petrochemical sector, particularly the supply of Saudi crude oil for the downstream industry. They also reviewed the extension of the December 2016 agreement on oil output adjustments under the OPEC/non-OPEC cooperation declaration. On the same day, Yasmin emphasised the importance of Brunei's MSMEs engaging in the digital economy, stressing that for MSMEs to thrive, they must embrace digital commerce. He highlighted the government's initiative to train 1,000 MSMEs in e-commerce through Darussalam Enterprise, aimed at improving their operations and boosting the national economy. Additionally, Yasmin reaffirmed the government's commitment to enhancing the business climate by simplifying business processes and supporting MSMEs. He encouraged MSMEs to seize opportunities to expand their market presence and contribute to Brunei's GDP, particularly through participation in expos.

In August 2017, Amrtur Corporation filed a US$45 million claim against BSP, alleging lost revenues of B$61.2 million (US$45 million) between 2012 and 2016 due to breaches of contracts with BSP. Yasmin was named as one of the 12 defendants in the case, which became widely discussed after a leaked letter related to the dispute went viral on social media. The case was linked to allegations of corruption within the Brunei sultanate, with Yasmin accused of involvement. Accusations arose that he had a conflict of interest during his time on the BSP board. Armtr Corporation's complaint focused on an alleged breach of contracts and income loss between 2012 and 2016, and the case was seen as part of the sultan's efforts to resolve conflicts of interest and promote government transparency. Later, Yasmin accompanied the sultan on his state visit to Beijing on 13 September 2017, where he also attended the 14th China–ASEAN Expo.

Following a cabinet reshuffle on 30 January 2018, Yasmin's was removed from the role as minister of energy and industry, with Mat Suny succeeding him. This significant reorganisation, aimed at advancing the sultan's commitment to combating corruption and fostering national development, sought to introduce fresh talent and accelerate the implementation of Wawasan Brunei 2035.

== Political views ==
Using Brunei's energy sector as a basis for economic growth and diversification was at the heart of Yasmin's political views. Through government LBD directives, which promoted the expansion of local businesses and generated employment possibilities, he fervently argued for maximising local content in oil and gas activities. In order to enhance Brunei's oil and gas resources, lessen its susceptibility to price swings, and draw in substantial foreign direct investment (FDI), like the multibillion-dollar investments made by Hengyi Industries and Brunei Fertilizer Industries, Yasmin placed a strong emphasis on the growth of downstream industries.

Yasmin also highlighted Brunei's ability to compete for FDI by making doing business easier. He did this by pointing out improvements that made Brunei the most improved economy in the World Bank's 2016 and 2017 Doing Business Reports. In line with the Wawasan Brunei 2035 goal of diversifying the economy and lowering dependency on oil, he thought these measures increased investor confidence in both the oil and non-oil industries. Yasmin went on to highlight Brunei's distinct assets, including its unexplored natural biodiversity and high-quality halal standards, as major forces behind regional competitiveness in high-priority industries including halal, technology, tourism, and business services.

== Personal life ==
Yasmin married Datin Hajah Noryasimah binti Abdullah on 5 August 1983, and the couple has a daughter.

== Titles, styles and honours ==
=== Titles and styles ===
Yasmin was honoured by Sultan Hassanal Bolkiah with the manteri title of Pehin Datu Singamanteri, bearing the style Yang Dimuliakan.

=== Honours ===
Yasmin has been bestowed the following honours:

National

- Order of Setia Negara Brunei First Class (PSNB; 15 July 2011) – Dato Seri Setia
- Order of Seri Paduka Mahkota Brunei First Class (SPMB; 15 July 2006) – Dato Seri Paduka
- Order of Seri Paduka Mahkota Brunei Second Class (DPMB; 15 July 2003) – Dato Paduka
- Order of Seri Paduka Mahkota Brunei Third Class (SMB)
- Sultan Hassanal Bolkiah Medal First Class (PHBS; 15 July 2010)
- Sultan of Brunei Silver Jubilee Medal (5 October 1992)
- Sultan of Brunei Golden Jubilee Medal (5 October 2017)
- National Day Silver Jubilee Medal (23 February 2009)
- Proclamation of Independence Medal (1997)
- General Service Medal
- Long Service Medal and Good Conduct (PKLPB)
- Royal Brunei Armed Forces Silver Jubilee Medal (31 May 1986)
- Fellow of Pertubuhan Ukur Jurutera & Arkitek (1 May 2010)

Foreign

- Indonesia:
  - Grand Meritorious Military Order Star, 3rd Class (30 December 2011)
- Jordan:
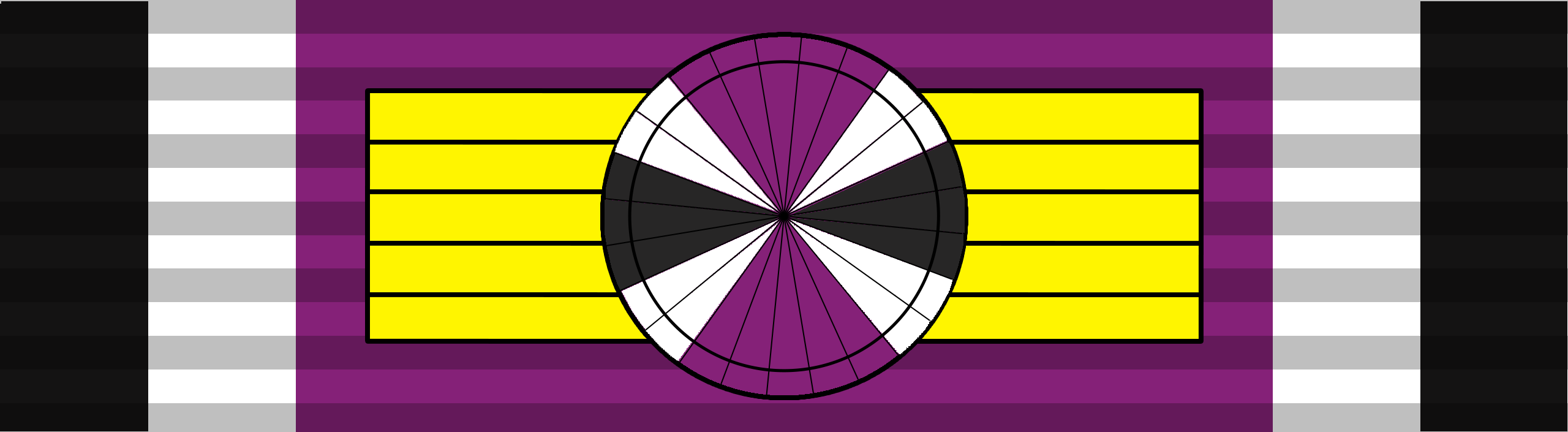
  - Grand Cordon of the Order of Independence (13 May 2008)
- Philippines:
  - Grand Cross of the Order of Sikatuna (GCrS; 24 August 2008)
- Singapore:
  - Darjah Utama Bakti Cemerlang (Tentera) (DUBC; 16 June 2011)
- United Kingdom:
  - Fellow of the Institution of Engineering and Technology (28 April 2008)

Political offices
Preceded by Mohammad Daud	3rd Minister of Energy and Industry; 29 May 2010 – 30 January 2018	Succeeded by Mat Suny
Preceded by Pengiran Ibnu Basit	2nd Deputy Minister of Defence; 24 May 2005 – 29 May 2010	Succeeded by Mustappa Sirat
