= Matsatejo Sokiaw =

Bruneian politician (born 1962)

Dato Seri Paduka Matsatejo Sokiaw SPMB
- متساتيجو سوكياو
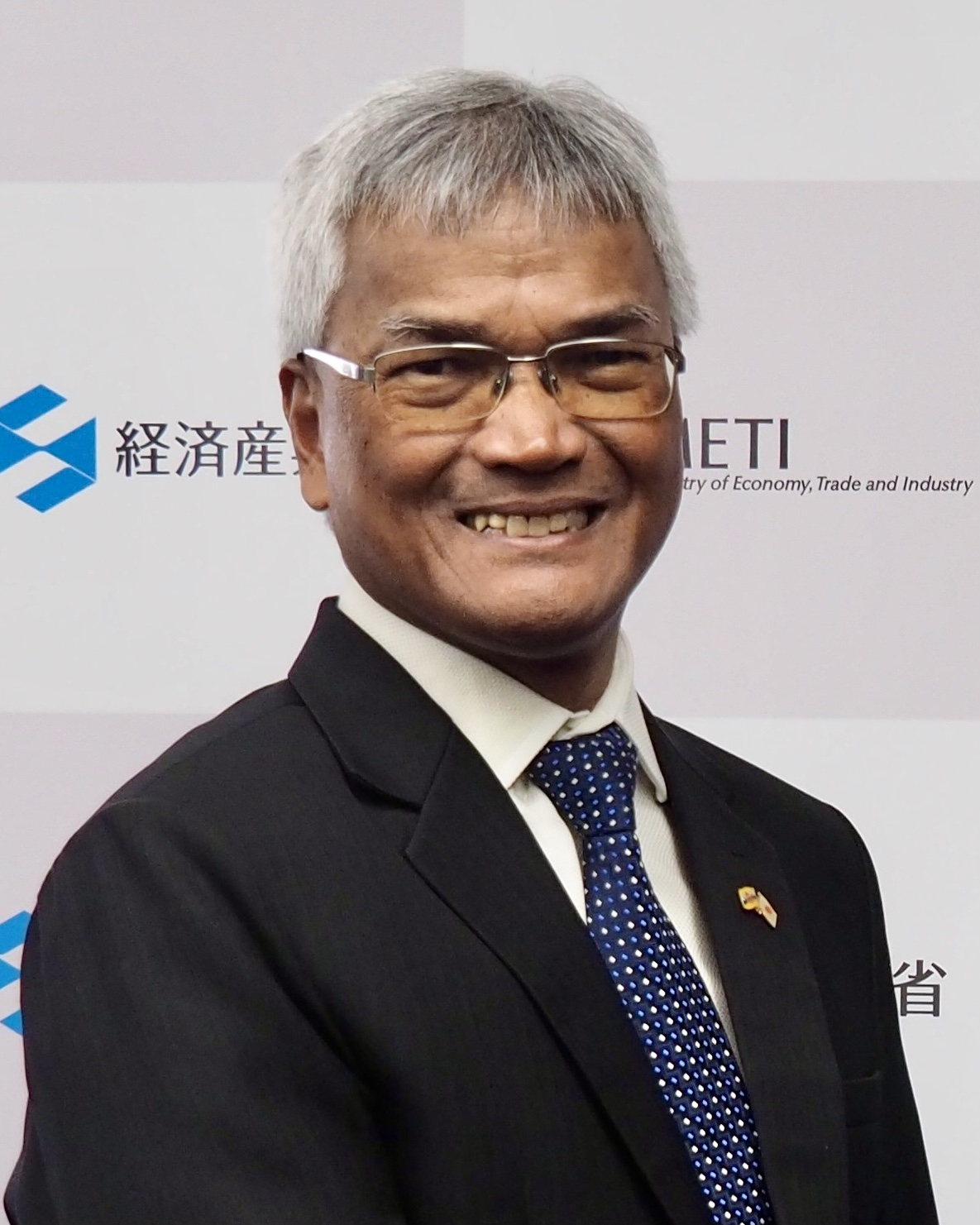
- Matsatejo in 2022

Deputy Minister (Energy) at the Prime Minister's Office
- In office 21 May 2022 – 24 October 2023
- Monarch: Hassanal Bolkiah
- Preceded by: Office restructured
- Succeeded by: Azmi Hanifah

Deputy Minister of Energy and Industry
- In office 30 January 2018 – 21 May 2022
- Minister: Mat Suny
- Preceded by: Jamain Julaihi
- Succeeded by: Office restructured

Personal details
- Born: May 1962 (age 63)
- Spouse: Aisah Timbang
- Occupation: Politician; civil servant; engineer

Matsatejo bin Sokiaw (born May 1962) is a retired Bruneian politician who was the Deputy Minister of Energy and Industry from 2018 to 2022, and later Deputy Minister (Energy) at the Prime Minister's Office from 2022 to 2023. Notably, he is also the managing director and CEO of the Brunei National Petroleum Company (PetroleumBRUNEI), the deputy chairman of the Authority for Info-communications Technology Industry (AITI), and the director of Darussalam Assets (DA).

== Early career and education ==
Matsatejo began his career in 1987 and has a broad foundation in engineering. After earning a Bachelor of Engineering (BEng) (Hons) in Chemical Engineering, he worked as a regulator, operator, joint venture partner, and service provider for more than 30 years in the oil and gas sector.

Prior to being appointed as Permanent Secretary (Energy) at the Prime Minister's Office in 2011, Matsatejo had a number of senior posts. In March 2012, he was named the Managing Director of Brunei LNG. Shortly after, he succeeded as the CEO of PetroleumBRUNEI.

The National Committee for the celebration of Sultan Hassanal Bolkiah's 60th birthday has collected a total of $156,841 in contributions since June 2006. The company's Senior Plant Manager Matsatejo delivered a check for $20,000 from BLNG as one of the donations.

== Ministerial career ==
During a cabinet reshuffle on 30 January 2018, Matsatejo was appointed deputy minister of energy, manpower and industry.

On 2 October 2019, Dato Matsatejo presided over the opening ceremony of the "Student Solar Ambassador Workshop" as the guest of honor. The workshop's major goal is to raise participants' understanding of how renewable energy technologies may be used and how they can benefit the environment. As part of the event, an exhibition was organized as well. The Ministry, through the Sustainable Energy Division and the Brunei Climate Change Secretariat, also took part in the exhibition to highlight its ongoing projects and programs including renewable energy and climate change mitigation.

Several of the aforementioned offenses may be compounded by any police officer not below the rank of Inspector specially authorized in this behalf by the Minister, or by any employee of the Authority specially authorized in this behalf by the Chief Executive, in accordance with section 67(1), as per the authority granted by section 67(2) of the Telecommunications Order, 2001. On 11 December 2019, Matsatejo, the chairman of AITI, made the regulation.

By command of Sultan Hassanal Bolkiah, the restructuring and renaming of the MEMI to Ministry of Energy, to allow the ministry to focus on energy matters, according to a press release on 18 November 2019. The industry portfolio will be given to the Ministry of Finance and Economy (MoFE) after the restructuring, and the Manpower and Employment Council (MPEC), which will take the place of the Manpower Council (MPC), will be established under the Prime Minister's Office. This leads to the reappointment of Matsatejo as the deputy minister.

Around 150 people planted saplings at the Biodiversity Park of the forest reserve under the direction of Dato Matsatejo. Beginning on 3 September 2022, 257 trees were planted at the Berakas Forest Reserve as part of the third Environmental Education Project. The initiative, which is being sponsored by Green Brunei, aims to increase public understanding of climate change while providing a forum for people to take action to lessen its effects. In order to raise awareness about the environment, it will also include two river cleanup events with participants and college students. Expected completion of the project is November.

=== Pulau Muara Besar ===
The first phase of Hengyi Industries' oil refinery and petrochemical facility in Pulau Muara Besar (PMB), according to Dato Matsatejo, has just finished construction on 25 July 2019. With a second phase scheduled to increase capacity to 500,000 barrels per day (bpd), Hengyi's facility will be able to refine up to 165,000 bpd, boosting the project's investment value to over $15 billion. During the speech, he stated:

Currently, the oil and gas sector is employing around 20,000 people. With the growth in the upstream and particularly the downstream and service sector, during operation phase-only, we would need another 15,000 people in the next few years. Brunei is celebrating 90 years of discovery of oil, and the first few discovered fields are still producing today. Inevitably, the secondary and tertiary enhanced recovery plays an important role to produce the remaining hydrocarbon in the depleted reservoirs. We have also invested significant amount and efforts in developing waterflood projects in one of our biggest offshore fields.

— Dato Seri Paduka Awang Haji Matsatejo bin Sokiaw, World Wide Fund

=== Diplomatic ties ===
On 9 September 2022, Dato' Raja Reza visited the Deputy Minister Matsatejo Sokiaw, at the Prime Minister's Office. Both parties expressed satisfaction with the close working ties between Malaysia and Brunei during the hour-long meeting, notably in the fields of energy and petroleum. Dato' Raja Reza used the occasion to express his gratitude on behalf of Malaysia to the Deputy Minister for his unflinching assistance in aiding Petronas's venture in the nation. Later on 9 December, Dato Matsatejo called Minister of Economy, Trade, and Industry Nishimura as a courtesy. The two ministers met and expressed their appreciation for Brunei's consistent delivery of LNG to Japan over a lengthy period of 50 years.

According to Minister for Power, Energy, and Mineral Resources Nasrul Hamid, Bangladesh aims to begin importing 1–1.5 million tonnes of LNG per year from Brunei in early 2023. While Matsatejo, led his nation's mission, Nasrul Hamid served as the delegation's leader for Bangladesh. Moreover, according to a news release from the ministry on 22 November 2022, Brunei decided at the conference to broaden the areas of cooperation in the energy industry. Nasrul stated that a new deal will need to be inked in order to import an average of 2.10 lakh tonnes of fuel from Brunei on a payment schedule. In addition, he ministry reports that between 2014 and 2016, Bangladesh imported more than 3.25 lakh tonnes of diesel from Brunei.

=== Termination ===
A statement from the Prime Minister's Office (PMO) on 23 October 2023, evening, stated that Dato Matsatejo's position as Deputy Minister of Energy in the PMO is terminated with immediate effect, per Sultan Hassanal Bolkiah's order. The Sultan has agreed to name Azmi Mohd Hanifah as the successor after the termination. The appointment and termination are effective as of Tuesday, 24th.

== Personal life ==
Three sons and a daughter are born into his marriage to Yang Mulia Datin Hajah Aisah binti Haji Timbang.

== Honours ==
Matsatejo has earned the following honours;

- Order of Seri Paduka Mahkota Brunei First Class (SPMB; 15 July 2018) – Dato Seri Paduka

Political offices
Preceded by Office restructured	Deputy Minister of Energy at the Prime Minister's Office; 21 May 2022 – 24 October 2023	Succeeded by Azmi Hanifah
Preceded by Jamain Julaihi	Deputy Minister of Energy and Industry; 30 January 2018 – 21 May 2022	Succeeded by Office restructured
