= Norsiah Abdul Gapar =

Bruneian writer (born 1952)

- نورسياه ابدول ڬاڤر
- Born: 24 April 1952 (age 74); Seria, Belait, Brunei
- Education: Anthony Abell College; Southampton Technical College; University of Surrey (BSc); University of London (MSc)
- Occupation: Writer
- Awards: S.E.A. Write Award

Norsiah binti Haji Abdul Gapar (born 24 April 1952) is a Bruneian writer who is the first Bruneian woman to be awarded the S.E.A. Write Award in 2009. She is regarded as one of Brunei's most successful female authors.

== Education and career ==
Norsiah was born on 24 April 1952, at the Bruneian town of Seria. From 1960 to 1963, Norsiah attended Muhammad Alam Malay School for her early schooling. After that, she enrolled at Anthony Abell College in 1964 to complete her high school studies. She had attended Southamptom Technical College in 1972 and obtained her Bachelor of Science (BSc) in medical biochemistry from the University of Surrey in 1978, where she earned a diploma in chemistry. She graduated with a Master of Science (MSc) in clinical biochemistry from London University in 1997.

She currently works as the acting chief scientific officer at the clinical chemistry laboratory of the Department of Laboratory Services, RIPAS Hospital.

== Writing career ==
One of Norsiah's many anthologies is Hidup Ibarat Sungai (Life is Like a River), which was released by DBP in 1972. Bunga Rampai Sastera Melayu Brunei (Potpourri of Brunei Malay Literature) came next in 1984. She released Puncak Bicara (Peak of Conversation) in 1985. Her first solo work, Pengabdian (Submission), was reissued by DBP in 1987, 2001, 2002, and 2007. It was also turned into a text book. Anthology Cerpen Wanita Brunei Awan Putih Berarak Damai (White Clouds Peace March: An Anthology of Short Stories by Brunei Women Writers) was released in 1988, and Janji Kepada Inah (A Promise for Inah), a book intended for teenage readers, was released in 2007.

Norsiah was well-known for her 2009 collection of short tales Tsunami di Hatinya (Tsunami in Her Heart) and her book Pengabdian, which was released in 2010 in its seventh edition. In honor of Brunei's independence day, the Dewan Bahasa dan Pustaka (DBP) held a novel writing contest, with her debut book Pengabdian taking first place. Her work in Bruneian literature stood out due to her use of the novel and short story forms, rather than poetry, to address modern female concerns.

- Hidup Ibarat Sungai (1972)
- Bunga Rampai Sastera Melayu Brunei (1984)
- Puncak Bicara (1985)
- Pengabdian (1987)
- The Islamic Interpretation of ‘Tragic Hero’ in Shakespearean Tragedies (2001)
- Colonial to Global: Malaysian Women’s Writing in English, 1940s-1990s (2001)
- In the Art of Naming: A Muslim Woman’s Journey (2006)
- Janji kepada Inah (2007)
- Tsunami di Hatinya (2009)
