= Department of Energy (Brunei) =

Cabinet-level government ministry of Brunei

- Jabatan Tenaga
- National emblem of Brunei

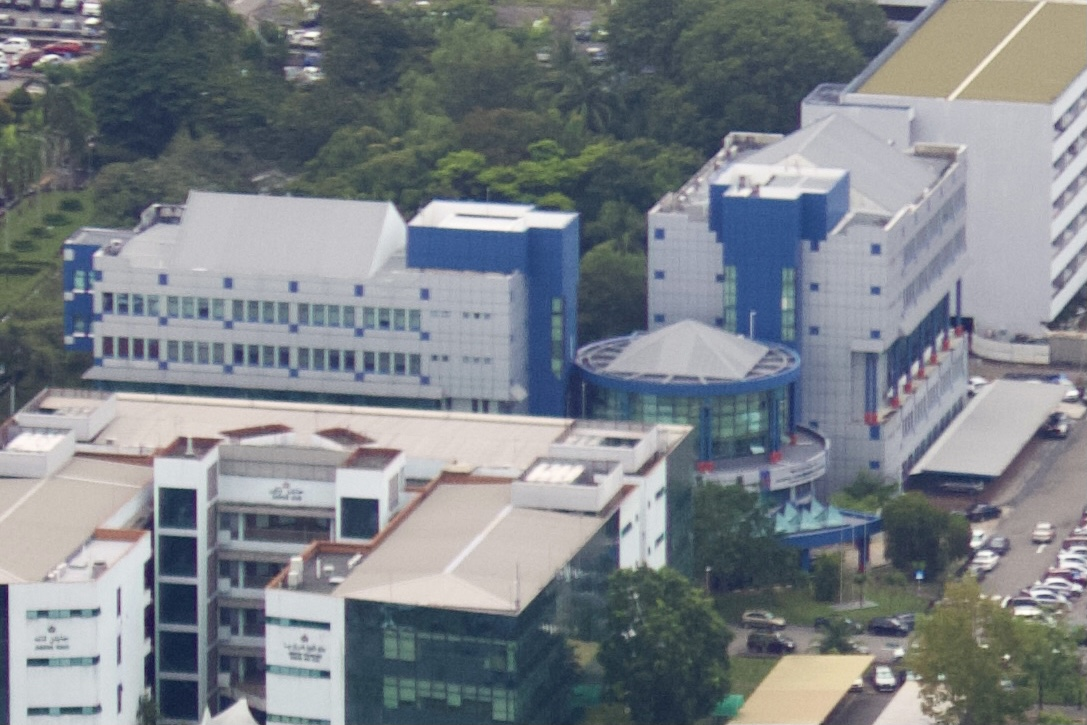
- Headquarters in 2022

Ministry overview
- Formed: 24 May 2005; 21 years ago
- Headquarters: Prime Minister's Office, Bandar Seri Begawan, Brunei; 4°55′11″N 114°56′17″E
- Annual budget: $178.3 million BND (2019)
- Deputy Minister responsible: Azmi Mohd Hanifah, Deputy Minister
- Child agencies: Department of Electrical Services; Centre for Capacity Building
- Website: Official website

The Department of Energy (Malay: Jabatan Tenaga), previously known as the Ministry of Energy and Ministry of Energy, Manpower and Industry, is a cabinet-level ministry in the Government of Brunei which oversees the country's energy industry. The department is led by the incumbent Deputy Minister of Energy, Mohammad Azmi bin Mohd Hanifah. The ministry is headquartered in the capital Bandar Seri Begawan, currently within the Prime Minister's Office building at Jalan Perdana Menteri.

== History ==
The history of the ministry began in 2005 with the establishment of the Energy Division, then under the Prime Minister's Office. In May 2011, the Energy Department was established with the restructuring of the Energy Division and the then Petroleum Unit, and in October 2015 it was renamed the Energy and Industry Department after the transfer of oversight on the industry sector from the then Ministry of Industry and Primary Resources (now Ministry of Primary Resources and Tourism). The department was still under the Prime Minister's Office until 2018 when it was upgraded to a ministry by the consent of His Majesty Sultan Hassanal Bolkiah, the Sultan of Brunei, on 18 April in that year, and subsequently adopted the name Ministry of Energy and Industry. The ministry was restructured on 31 July in the same year, hence renamed the Ministry of Energy, Manpower and Industry. It was restructured again and finally adopted its current name on 18 November 2019, whereby the non-energy industry portfolio is now subsumed under the restructured Ministry of Finance and Economy, whereas the manpower portfolio is now the responsibility of the Manpower and Employment Council.

== Budget ==
In the current fiscal year (2019–20), the ministry is allocated a budget of B$178.3 million (US$131 million as of July 2019).

== List of ministers ==
=== Minister ===
No.	Portrait	Minister	Term start	Term end	Time in office	Ref.
1		Yahya Bakar	24 May 2005	22 August 2008	3 years, 90 days	
2		Mohammad Daud	22 August 2008	29 May 2010	1 year, 280 days	
3		Yasmin Umar	29 May 2010	30 January 2018	7 years, 246 days	
4		Mat Suny	30 January 2018	21 May 2022	4 years, 111 days	

=== Deputy minister ===
No.	Portrait	Minister	Term start	Term end	Time in office	Ref.
Ministry of Energy
1		Matsatejo Sokiaw	30 January 2018	21 May 2022	4 years, 111 days	
Department of Energy
(1)		Matsatejo Sokiaw	21 May 2022	24 October 2023	1 year, 156 days	
2		Azmi Hanifah	24 October 2023	incumbent	2 years, 346 days	
