= Ali Mohammad Daud =

Bruneian politician and diplomat (1936–2018)

Yang Dimuliakan Pehin Orang Kaya Setia Raja Dato Seri Paduka Ali Mohammad Daud SPMB SLJ PJK PKL
- علي محمد داود
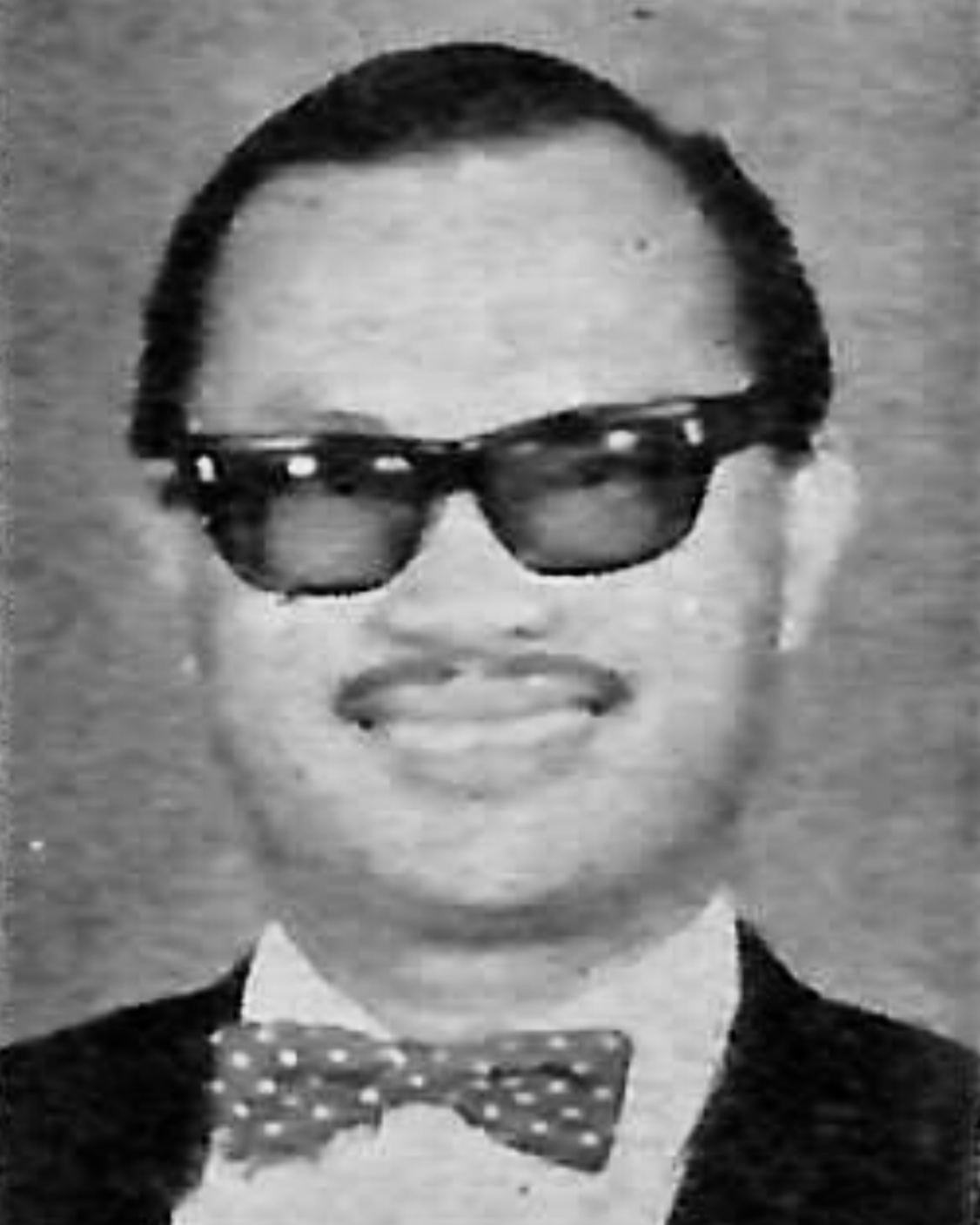
- Mohammad Ali in 1969

2nd Deputy Minister of Foreign Affairs
- In office 1989 – 24 May 2005
- Monarch: Hassanal Bolkiah
- Minister: Mohamed Bolkiah
- Preceded by: Zakaria Sulaiman
- Succeeded by: Office abolished

1st Deputy Minister of Culture, Youth and Sports
- In office 20 October 1986 – 1 January 1989
- Minister: Hussain Mohammad Yusof
- Preceded by: Office established
- Succeeded by: Selamat Munap

Personal details
- Born: 25 February 1936 Kampong Ujong Tanjong, Kampong Ayer, Brunei
- Died: 24 October 2018 (aged 82) Kampong Serusop, Bandar Seri Begawan, Brunei
- Resting place: Jame' Asr Hassanil Bolkiah Cemetery, Bandar Seri Begawan, Brunei
- Education: Sultan Omar Ali Saifuddien College; Birmingham University; Queen Elizabeth House
- Profession: Politician and diplomat

Mohammad Ali bin Haji Mohammad Daud (25 February 1936 – 24 October 2018) was a Bruneian aristocrat, politician and diplomat who served as the Deputy Minister of Culture, Youth and Sports from 1986 to 1989, and Deputy Minister of Foreign Affairs from 1989 to 2005. Additionally, he was a member of the Islamic Religious Council, director of several Bruneian banks (Islamic Bank of Brunei (IBB), Takaful IBB, and IBB Transport) and the president of the Brunei Scouts from 1974 to 1979.

== Early life and education ==
On 25 February 1936, Mohammad Ali was born in Kampong Ujong Tanjong, Kampong Ayer. He went for early schooling at the Pekan Brunei Malay School, and later obtained his teacher training at the Batu Lintang Teacher Training Centre in Kuching, Sarawak. Prior to pursuing legal studies at Birmingham University in the United Kingdom, he obtained his Sarawak Junior Certificate at the Sultan Omar Ali Saifuddien College (at the time called Pekan Brunei English School), alongside Zakaria Sulaiman. Additionally, he completed a term in the Queen Elizabeth House, Oxford University's Foreign Service Programme.

== Career ==
In 1958, Mohammad Ali worked for the government as a clerk before being promoted to a number of positions, including assistant legal adviser, deputy public prosecutor, first-class referee, acting chief registrar, senior administrative officer, immigration and national registration controller, and Sir Dennis White's assistant in London. In addition, he served as the interim director of the Anti-Corruption Bureau (ACB), adviser to the ACB, and senior officer in the Office of the Private and Confidential Secretary to the Sultan. He was also the previous deputy head of the Department of Diplomatic Services. The ACB had a small number of investigators and support employees in its early years after being established on 1 February 1982, with him being named as its first director. Mohammad Ali has served as the permanent secretary at the Ministry of Home Affairs, Deputy Minister of Culture, Youth and Sports on 20 October 1986, and Deputy Minister of Foreign Affairs from 1 January 1989 to 24 May 2005. On 2 May 1986, launched the Brunei Darussalam Library Association (BLA) at the Hassanal Bolkiah National Stadium.

== Brunei Scouts ==
Since Mohammad Ali joined the Brunei Scouts at the age of seven, under his strong leadership, and in close collaboration with other scouts, the Scouts Association has grown by carrying out scout activities that are advantageous to its members, which are young people. He has taken part in several scouting conferences and jamborees both locally and abroad throughout his time with the organisation. For his contributions to the scout movement, he was also given a number of decorations, including the RAKIS Medal and the Merit Medal (England). He was an enthusiastic member of the Persekutuan Pengakap Negara Brunei Darussalam and had served as its president in Brunei Darussalam.

== Later life and death ==
According to Kadhi Court, Chapter 77 and Section 13 of the Islamic Religious Council Act, the Sultan of Brunei gave his approval for the appointment of new members, including Mohammad Ali, to the MUIB for a term of three years, beginning on 1 August 2017, and ending on 31 July 2020.

At the age of 82, Mohammad Ali died in his home at 7.45 pm on 24 October 2018, was remembered by the Sultan Hassanal Bolkiah and Prince Al-Muhtadee Billah, during a Abdul Aziz Juned-led Jenazah prayers at his residence in Kampong Serusop, Berakas 'A' on the following day. He was later buried in the Muslim cemetery at Jame' Asr Hassanil Bolkiah.

== Awards and honours ==
Mohammad Ali was bestowed the Manteri title of Yang Dimuliakan Pehin Orang Kaya Setia Raja on 21 May 1996.

=== Awards ===
- Meritorious Youth Leader Award (2007)

=== Honours ===
Mohammad Ali has earned the following honours;

==== National ====
- Order of Seri Paduka Mahkota Brunei First Class (SPMB) – Dato Seri Paduka
- Order of Seri Paduka Mahkota Brunei Second Class (DPMB) – Dato Paduka
- Order of Paduka Seri Laila Jasa Third Class (SLJ)
- Meritorious Service Medal (PJK)
- Long Service Medal (PKL)
- Proclamation of Independence Medal (1997)

==== Foreign ====
- Egypt:
  - Grand Cordon of the Order of Merit

Political offices
Preceded by Zakaria Sulaiman	2nd Deputy Minister of Foreign Affairs; 1989 – 24 May 2005	Succeeded by Office abolished
Preceded by Office established	1st Deputy Minister of Culture, Youth and Sports; 20 October 1986 – 1 January 1989	Succeeded by Selamat Munap
