= Public Service Department (Brunei) =

Government agency in Brunei

Coordinates: 4.9043509°N 114.9323583°E

- Jabatan Perkhidmatan Awam جابتن ڤرخدمتن عوام
- National emblem of Brunei

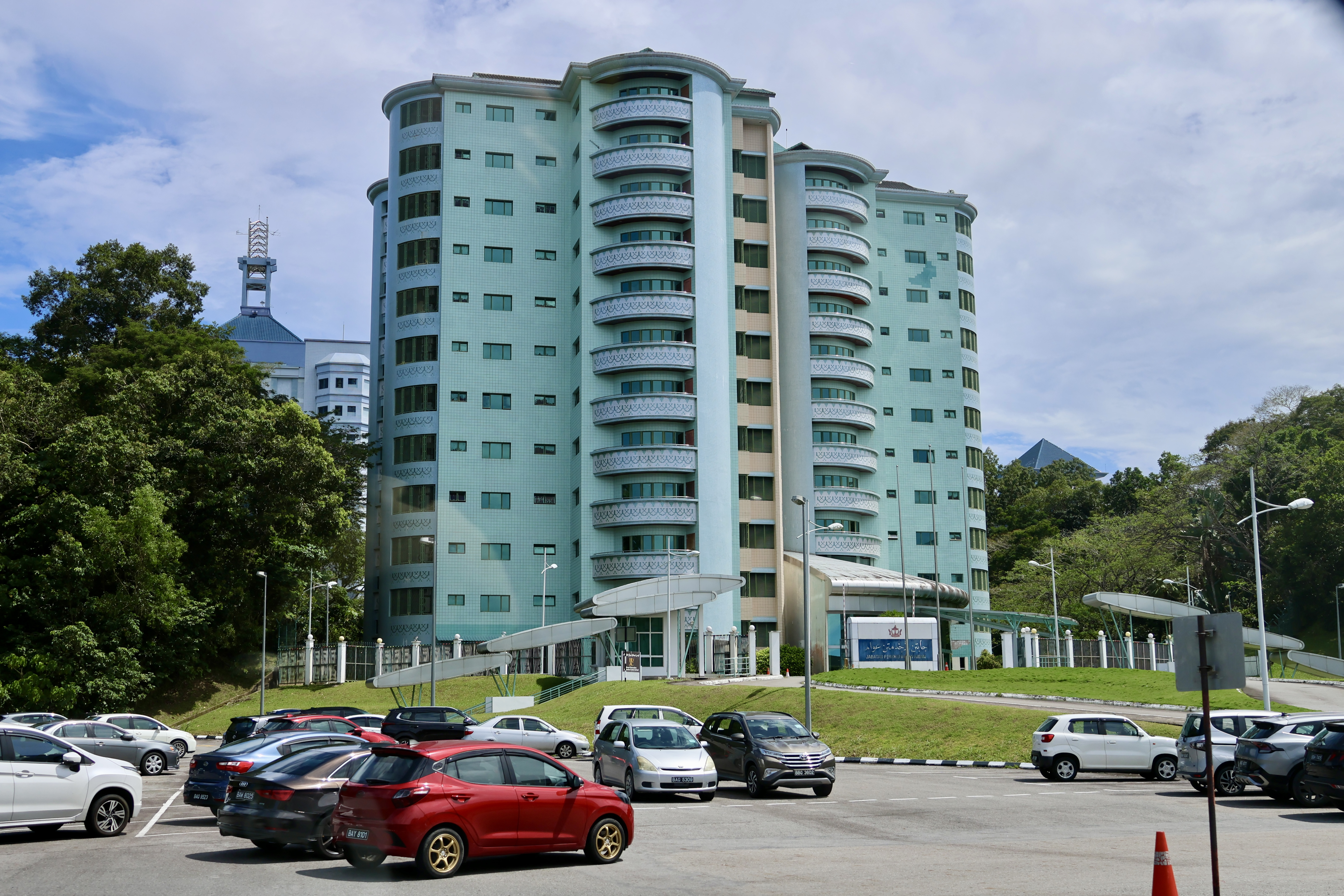
- Headquarters in Jalan Kumbang Pasang, Brunei

Agency overview
- Formed: 1 July 1971; 55 years ago
- Jurisdiction: Government of Brunei
- Headquarters: Simpang 156, Jalan Kumbang Pasang, Bandar Seri Begawan, Brunei BA1311
- Employees: 267 (2026)
- Agency executive: Dr. Norfarizal Othman, Director-general
- Parent agency: Prime Minister's Office
- Website: www.jpa.gov.bn

The Public Service Department (Malay: Jabatan Perkhidmatan Awam; Jawi: جابتن ڤرخدمتن عوام; JPA) is a department overseen by the Prime Minister's Office (PMO). It serves as the central agency for managing human resources in Brunei's public sector. It is tasked with planning, managing, and developing the civil service workforce to ensure consistent and efficient contributions to national administration and economic progress. The JPA's responsibilities include formulating and reviewing human resource policies through structured planning and research, implementing effective administrative systems, and enhancing the skills and capabilities of civil servants to align with organisational objectives and national priorities.

== History ==
Originally established as the Office of Public Service on 1 July 1971, the department initially operated as a section within the State Secretary's Office, led by a job officer. Its primary responsibility was managing staff administration within the public service. On 1 August 1975, the office became an independent entity, headed by a director, and by 1 January 1976, the director position was formally established.

After Brunei's independence on 1 January 1984, the office was placed under the PMO. On 1 March 1992, it underwent comprehensive restructuring to improve efficiency and redefine its roles, responsibilities, and activities. Subsequently, on 1 May 1993, it was renamed the Public Service Department, headed by the director-general of public service. At the same time, the department's Training Unit was elevated to the Institute of Public Service and incorporated as a section under the PMO. This rebranding signified the department's broader role as a central agency for managing and developing the human resources of Brunei's public service.

On 2 January 2020, JPA relocated its headquarters to Jalan Kumbang Pasang, Bandar Seri Begawan. On 1 July 2021, the department marked its golden jubilee, celebrating 50 years of service.

== Organisational structure ==
=== Leadership offices ===
The JPA leadership positions is as follows:

- Director-general
  - Deputy director-general
    - Counselling services
    - Development and management
    - Information technology management
    - Membership and training administration
    - Personnel services
    - Research and planning

=== Divisions ===
The JPA is divided into six major divisions:

- Counseling Services Section
- Development & Management Section
- Information Technology Management Section
- Personnel Service Section
- Research & Planning Section
- Staffing & Training Administration Section

== Director-generals ==
A list of JPA director-generals since becoming an independent entity on 1 August 1975:

No.	Name	Term of office			Monarch
No.	Name	Start of term	End of term	Duration	Monarch
1	Abdul Rahman Taib	1 August 1975	31 July 1980	4 years, 365 days	Hassanal Bolkiah
2	Zakaria Sulaiman	1 August 1980	31 December 1980	152 days	Hassanal Bolkiah
3	Selamat Munap	1 January 1981	7 February 1982	1 year, 37 days	Hassanal Bolkiah
4	Ahmad Jumat	8 February 1982	31 December 1982	326 days	Hassanal Bolkiah
5	Zakaria Sulaiman	1 January 1983	4 January 1984	1 year, 3 days	Hassanal Bolkiah
6	Kassim Daud	1 April 1985	19 November 1986	1 year, 232 days	Hassanal Bolkiah
7	Ahmad Yusof	1 January 1987	12 June 1988	1 year, 163 days	Hassanal Bolkiah
8	Danial Hanafiah	13 June 1988	30 September 1996	1 year, 163 days	Hassanal Bolkiah
9	Zainal Mumin	1 May 1997	31 July 2001	4 years, 91 days	Hassanal Bolkiah
10	Yunos Mahmud	6 February 2003	12 November 2003	279 days	Hassanal Bolkiah
11	Saifon Besar	13 November 2003	18 August 2007	3 years, 278 days	Hassanal Bolkiah
12	Sa Bali Abas	8 November 2007	24 December 2008	1 year, 46 days	Hassanal Bolkiah
13	Ibrahim Hassan	25 December 2008	2 December 2010	1 year, 342 days	Hassanal Bolkiah
14	Pengiran Mohammad Ali	3 February 2011	1 May 2012	1 year, 88 days	Hassanal Bolkiah
15	Jaini Abdullah	23 October 2012	1 November 2015	3 years, 9 days	Hassanal Bolkiah
16	Abdul Manap Othman	31 December 2016	30 November 2017	334 days	Hassanal Bolkiah
17	Dr. Norfarizal Othman	1 December 2017	Incumbent	8 years, 251 days	Hassanal Bolkiah

== Initiatives ==
=== Civil Service Club ===
The Civil Service Club in Kampong Mentiri, established by the government of Brunei, serves as a facility offering sports amenities, event halls, and multipurpose rooms for various activities. Officially inaugurated on 26 August 1990 by Isa bin Ibrahim, the club provides civil servants and their families with opportunities for sports and recreational activities. Open to all government employees, the club offers membership with a monthly fee based on the rank of the civil servant.

=== Civil Service Leadership Pipeline ===
The Civil Service Leadership Pipeline (CSLP) was introduced on 19 November 2016 to support Wawasan Brunei 2035 through the Institutional Development Strategy under the Civil Service Framework. The CSLP aims to create a leadership pool comprising Division II officers and above to strengthen strategic human resource planning in the civil service. Its objectives include identifying, developing, and preparing potential leaders over a 10½-year period through the Fast-Track Promotion Method (KPLL) and facilitating systematic succession planning to fill strategic roles in ministries and government departments. As a talent management initiative, the CSLP provides structured guidance to prepare officers for senior positions, subject to availability and eligibility.

The CSLP also focuses on nurturing civil servants to address evolving public needs and enhance organisational performance. Programmes under the CSLP, such as the Young Executive Programme introduced in 2017 and conducted by the Civil Service Institute, offer training in leadership, teamwork, communication, and management.
