= Zakaria Sulaiman =

Bruneian politician (1937–2011)

Yang Dimuliakan Pehin Orang Kaya Amar Pahlawan Dato Seri Setia Zakaria Sulaiman PSNB DSLJ SNB PHBS PJK
- زكريا سليمان
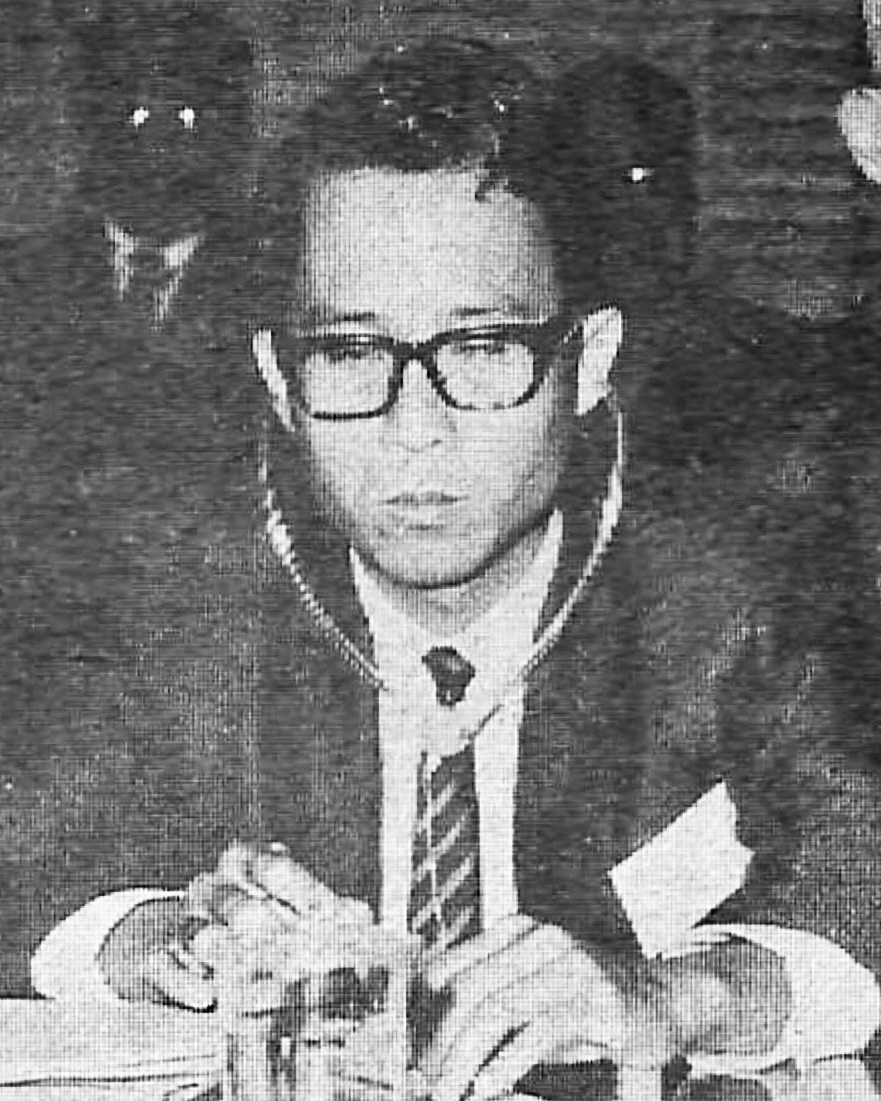
- Zakaria in 1966

3rd Minister of Communications
- In office 30 November 1988 – 24 May 2005
- Monarch: Hassanal Bolkiah
- Preceded by: Abdul Aziz Umar
- Succeeded by: Abu Bakar Apong

1st Deputy Minister of Foreign Affairs
- In office 20 October 1986 – 1989
- Minister: Mohamed Bolkiah
- Preceded by: Office established
- Succeeded by: Ali Mohammad Daud

Personal details
- Born: 22 June 1937 Brunei
- Died: 1 November 2011 (aged 74) Jerudong Park Medical Centre, Brunei–Muara, Brunei
- Resting place: Kampong Lambak Muslim Cemetery, Brunei–Muara, Brunei
- Spouse: Jusnani Lawie
- Children: 5; including Amer Hishamuddin
- Education: Sultan Omar Ali Saifuddien College; University of Birmingham
- Profession: Politician; diplomat
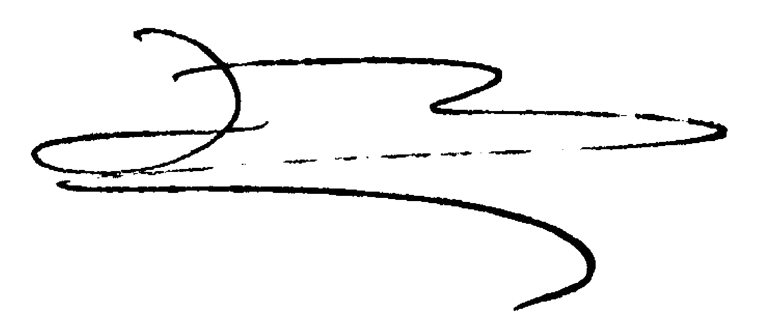
- Signature

Zakaria bin Haji Sulaiman (22 June 1937 – 1 November 2011) was a Bruneian aristocrat and politician who took office as the Minister of Communications from 1988 to 2005, and Deputy Minister of Foreign Affairs from 1986 to 1989.

== Early life and education ==
Zakaria was born on 22 June 1937. He attended Berakas Malay School for his early primary education and obtained his Sarawak Junior Certificate at the Sultan Omar Ali Saifuddien College in 1956, alongside Ali Mohammad Daud In 1965, he was admitted to the bar at the Middle Temple in London after completing his legal studies at the University of Birmingham in England.

== Political career ==
Zakaria joined the government service in 1965 as an administrative officer after returning from his studies abroad. He had previously held a variety of positions within the civil service, including those of magistrate, deputy controller of Immigration and Registrar of Nationals, deputy commissioner of land on 1 May 1972, commissioner of land on 8 April 1972, director of the Brunei Economic Development Board in 1975, director of establishment, secretary for Coordination to the Coronation Administration Committee in 1968, acting commissioner of development on 23 July 1967, and private secretary to the Sultan Hassanal Bolkiah sometime prior to the country's independence. On 1 June 1971, he was appointed as a member of the legal committee.

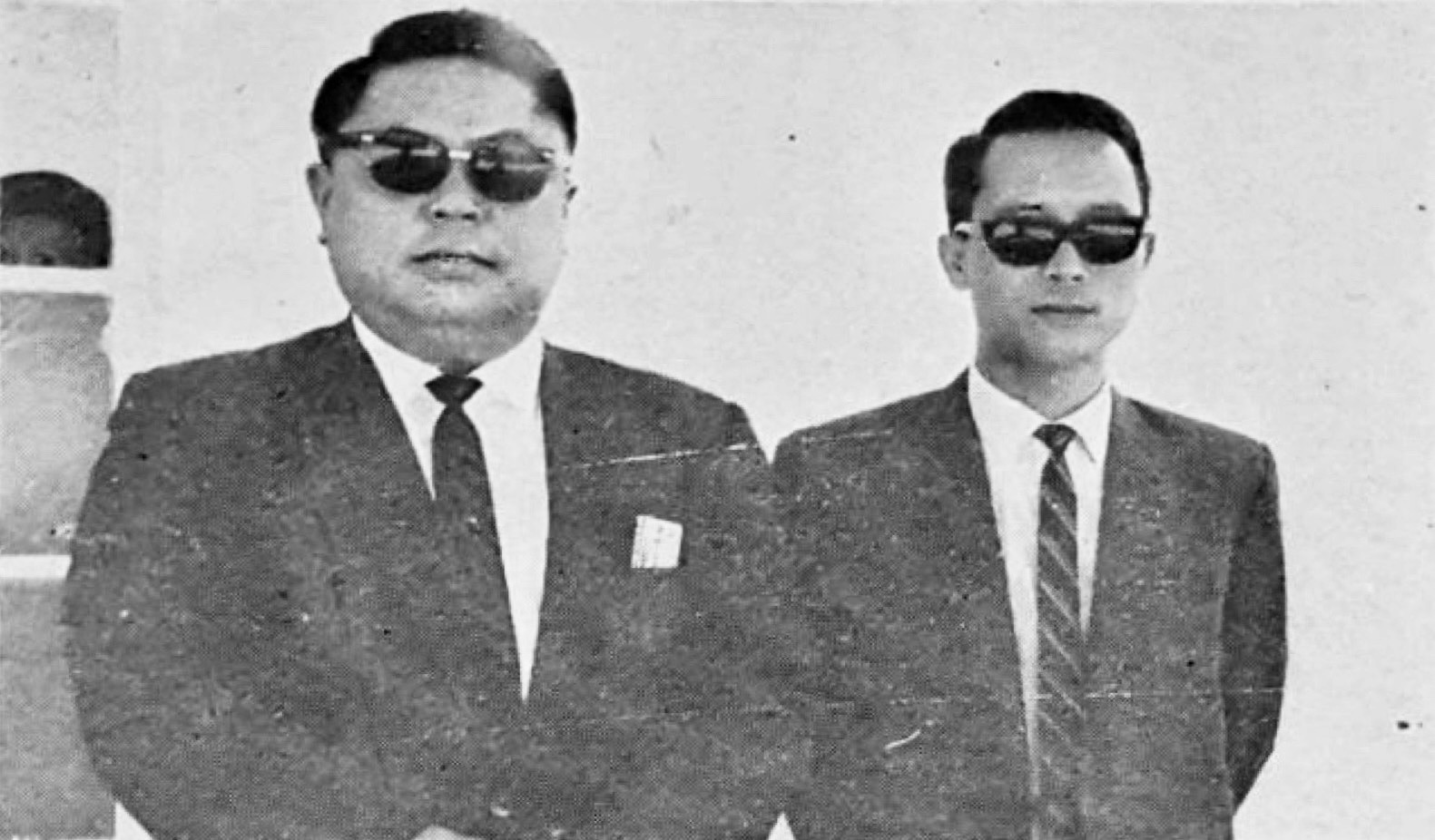
Othman Chua Kwong Soon and Zakaria in 1967

In 1966, he participated as a representative and team trustee in Brunei's delegation to the first Asian Industrial Development Council's conference in Bangkok, Thailand, alongside Assistant Minister of Agriculture Pengiran Damit. On 21 March 1967, he was a member of the Bruneian delegation to the Tokyo ECAFE. Othman Chua Kwong Soon and Zakaria from the state secretary's office attended the Inter-Governmental Consultation Conference on Regional and District Economic Planning and Cooperation Coordination, which took place from 16 November 1967, for 10 days.

From 1 August to 31 December 1980 and 1 January 1983 to 4 January 1984, Zakaria was the director-general of the Public Service Department. In 1982, he was appointed as the director of the newly established Brunei Diplomatic Service, which took over the responsibilities of government agencies in London and Singapore. Under his leadership, staff for overseas service were trained at Oxford University to prepare for Brunei's new international responsibilities.

When Brunei gained independence in 1984, he was named Personal Secretary (Political) at the Ministry of Foreign Affairs. According to Eusoff Agaki in 1991, he was the first director of Brunei Diplomatic Service in 1982. He left his position as a civil servant and was appointed deputy minister of foreign affairs on 20 October 1986. As the acting minister of foreign affairs, he signed the Agreement on ASEAN Energy Co-operation in Manila on 24 June 1986. From 1 January 1989 to 23 May 2005, Zakaria was the minister of communications.

Zakaria also declared in 2001 that B$11 million will be allocated for computer education initiatives in public schools in Brunei. On 9 July 2002, he gave the Ministry of Defence's Defence Information Technology Unit (DITU), also known as Unit Teknologi Maklumat Pertahanan (UTMP), an official debut. DITU offers facilities and services for the provision of computer equipment, the maintenance and repair of computers, and the provision of networks, including Intranet and Internet networks. During the 2003 World Summit on Information Society, he announced that Brunei had set up a wide-ranging broadband backbone optical network that spans the entire nation. Additionally, a variety of e-projects are being carried out. The government had allocated B$1 billion to mobilise e-government applications and services in support of this endeavour. His tenure as minister came to an end in the 2005 Bruneian cabinet reshuffle on 24 May.

== Death ==
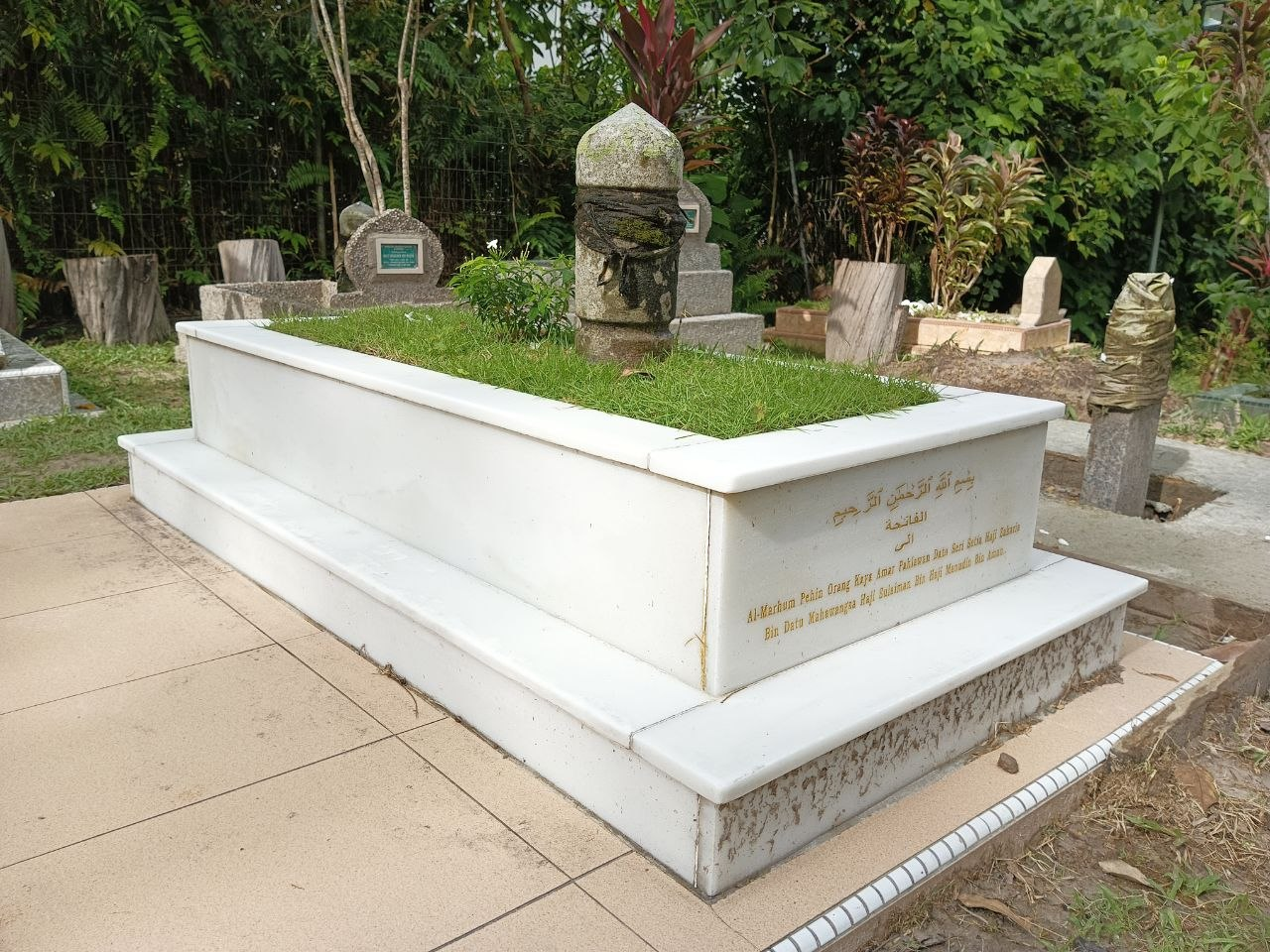
Grave of Pehin Zakaria Sulaiman at Kampong Lambak Muslim Cemetery

On the morning of 2 November 2011, Sultan Hassanal Bolkiah paid his respects to Zakaria, who died early on the evening of the day prior after succumbing to a terminal illness at the Jerudong Park Medical Centre. Prince Mohamed Bolkiah, Princess Masna, and Pengiran Anak Abdul Aziz were there to pay their final respects earlier in the morning at the late former minister's residence in Jalan Terunjing, Kampong Lambak. Cabinet ministers and former ministers, some of whom collaborated with the late Pehin during his 16-year tenure as the Minister of Communications until 2005, were also present at the funeral. One of those who paid their respects that morning was Joseph K. H. Koh, the Singapore High Commissioner to Brunei Darussalam. His body was interred at the Kampong Lambak Muslim Cemetery.

== Personal life ==
Zakaria had five children and ten grandchildren. He is married to Datin Paduka Hajah Jusnani binti Haji Lawie (1940–2023). He enjoys gardening and playing golf. He has a son named Amer Hishamuddin, permanent secretary (infrastructure, Housing and Professional) at the Ministry of Development. At the time of his death, he has three sons, a daughter and eleven grandkids. His wife is a highly distinguished individual in her own right.

== Honours ==
Zakaria was given the Manteri title of Pehin Orang Kaya Amar Pahlawan Dato Seri Setia in 1996. He is also awarded the following honours:

- Order of Setia Negara Brunei First Class (PSNB) – Dato Seri Setia; Third Class (SNB)
- Order of Paduka Seri Laila Jasa Second Class (DSLJ) – Dato Seri Laila Jasa
- Sultan Hassanal Bolkiah Medal (PHBS)
- Meritorious Service Medal (PJK)

Political offices
Preceded by Abdul Aziz Umar	3rd Minister of Communications; 30 November 1988 – 24 May 2005	Succeeded by Abu Bakar Apong
Preceded by Office established	1st Deputy Minister of Foreign Affairs; 20 October 1986 – 1989	Succeeded by Ali Mohammad Daud
