= Jame' Asr Hassanil Bolkiah Mosque =

Mosque in Kiarong, Bandar Seri Begawan, Brunei

- Masjid Jame' Asr Hassanil Bolkiah
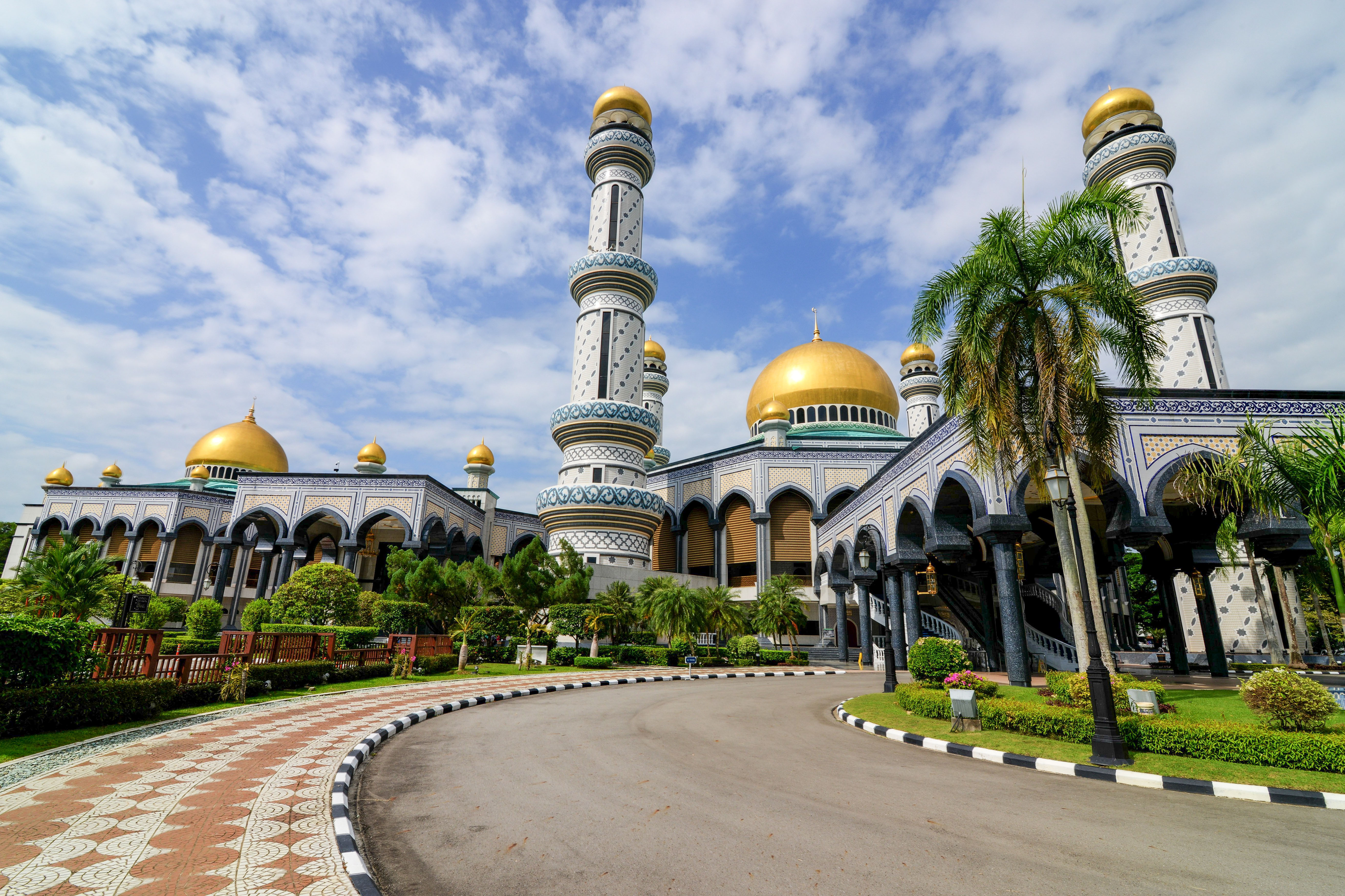
- The mosque in 2014

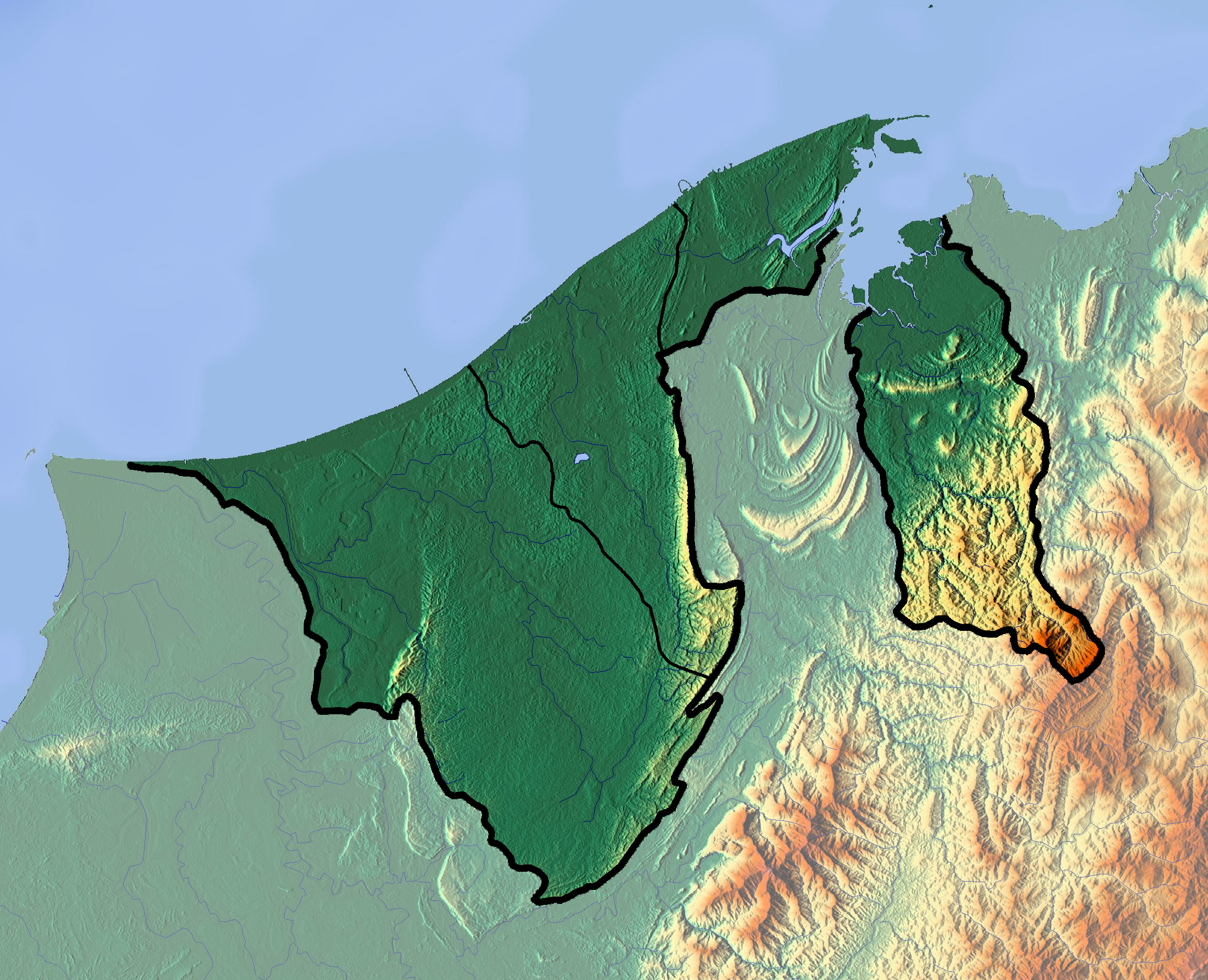
- Location of the mosque in Brunei

Religion
- Affiliation: Sunni Islam
- Ownership: Government of Brunei
- Governing body: Department of Mosque Affairs (Note: Every mosque in the country is governed by the Department of Mosque Affairs of the Ministry of Religious Affairs.)
- Status: Active

Location
- Location: Kiarong, Bandar Seri Begawan
- Country: Brunei
- Interactive map of Jame' Asr Hassanil Bolkiah Mosque
- Coordinates: 4°53′52.6″N 114°55′18.4″E

Architecture
- Type: mosque
- Style: Islamic architecture
- Founder: Sultan Hassanal Bolkiah
- Groundbreaking: 1988
- Completed: 1994
- Construction cost: US$350 million

Specifications
- Capacity: 5,000 worshipers
- Dome: 29
- Minaret: 4
- Minaret height: 58 m (190 ft)
- Site area: 8.1 ha (20 acres)
- Materials: Italian marble; Philippine hardwood, gold leaf

The Jame' Asr Hassanil Bolkiah Mosque (Malay: Masjid Jame' Asr Hassanil Bolkiah) is a Sunni mosque, located in Bandar Seri Begawan, Brunei. It is the largest mosque in Brunei, and one of the country's two state mosques (masjid negara), the other being Omar Ali Saifuddien Mosque. It is situated on the northern border of the Kampong Kiarong suburb, 3 kilometres (1.9 mi) northwest of Pusat Bandar. The mosque is named in honour of Hassanal Bolkiah, the 29th Sultan of Brunei.

== History ==
Sultan Hassanal Bolkiah summoned John Lawson to the country's capital, in the early 1990s after being inspired by the Englishman's work. Lawson was asked to design the glass dome for a new mosque that would be constructed to honour the Silver Jubilee of Hassanal Bolkiah. Although it was first officially called the Kiarong Mosque, it would go on to be renamed Jame' Asr Hassanil Bolkiah Mosque.

The largest mosque in the nation, spanning a 8.1-hectare (20-acre) site, was given as a gift by the Sultan. Construction started in 1988 and the mosque was formally opened on 14 July 1994, the Sultan's 48th birthday. The Maghrib and Isyak prayers were performed at the inaugural ceremony; (Note: Funds were to come from the Sultan's "private fortune.") and the Sultan delivered the Friday sermon. Prominent individuals who have visited the mosque include Benazir Bhutto and Goh Chok Tong in 1996, Queen Elizabeth II in 1998, and King Abdullah II in 2000. The mosque has gained popularity as a tourist destination, with an average of fifty people every day, excepting Thursdays and the hours before Friday prayers. In addition, the mosque also provides pre-marital education, and offers Al-Quran reading sessions given by nearby religious instructors.

== Design and features ==
The mosque features 29 golden domes and four minarets, each standing 58 metres (190 ft). The domes commemorate the 29 Bruneian Sultans, while the marble stairs, with 29 steps, honour the current 29th Sultan of Brunei, Hassanal Bolkiah. Five water fountains symbolise both the five daily prayers and the five pillars of Islam. The mihrab is decorated with 24-carat gold-plated tiles and black marble stones, with the largest dome situated above the male prayer hall. The mosque's air-conditioned interiors, which can accommodate up to 5,000 worshipers at once, are designed with imported materials from across the world, including Persian carpets, Italian marble, Philippine hardwood, and gold.

The air muleh pattern of greenery, which is recognised as a national emblem and symbolises the Malay identity and spirit of the Bruneians, was a prominent architectural adornment on this tower. The mosque's interior design incorporates air muleh patterns in the minaret walls, entablatures, and chandelier glasswork. The octagonal tessera in the minarets creates a "pixelated" effect reminiscent of traditional Bruneian woven textiles, while the main hall's chandelier subtly showcases wing pairs, a component of the royal and national insignia.

Among the features are the separate prayer sections for men and women, an administration block, a multipurpose hall, a VIP conference room, a library, a royal suite, and a VIP lounge and eating area. The 5,600-square-metre (60,000 sq ft) male prayer hall can hold up to 3,500 attendees. Beneath its ornate dome is a gold-plated chandelier crafted from Austrian strass crystal. The hall's construction is made up of marble from Italy and a dome made in Malaysia, as well as 48 window arches decorated with Quranic calligraphy. Similarly, the first-floor female prayer hall can hold up to 1,000 worshipers and has a chandelier at the middle of its dome.

The mosque have spaces dedicated to male and female ablution. The automatic areas are run by US-based sensors, while the manual areas are fully automated. Named for the late State Mufti Ismail Omar Abdul Aziz, the mosque's library houses two different kinds of collections: a General Collection that has over 22,000 copies of over 5,000 titles on various topics related to Islam, and a Reference Collection that includes theses, manuscripts, encyclopedias, and journals. During business hours, which are from 2:15 PM to 4:00 PM and 8:30 AM to 11:45 AM, the library is available to the public.

== Muslim cemetery ==
The Tanah Perkuburan Islam Kampung Kiarong (Kampong Kiarong Islamic Cemetery), sometimes referred to as Jame Asr Cemetery, is situated near the mosque. Notable burials are:

- Mahmud Saedon
- Pengiran Mohammad Yusof Limbang
- Abidin Abdul Rashid, former Deputy Minister of Home Affairs
- Victims of the 2012 Rampayoh helicopter crash
  - Ismael Samid
  - Pengiran Haji Arif Iskandar
  - Khairol Mahdi Sahri
  - Khairuddin Haji Abbas
- Mashud Damit, Brunei's first winner of the International Quran Recital Competition
- Ali Mohammad Daud, former Deputy Minister of Foreign Affairs
- Abu Bakar Ibrahim, former member of Legislative Council

== Gallery ==
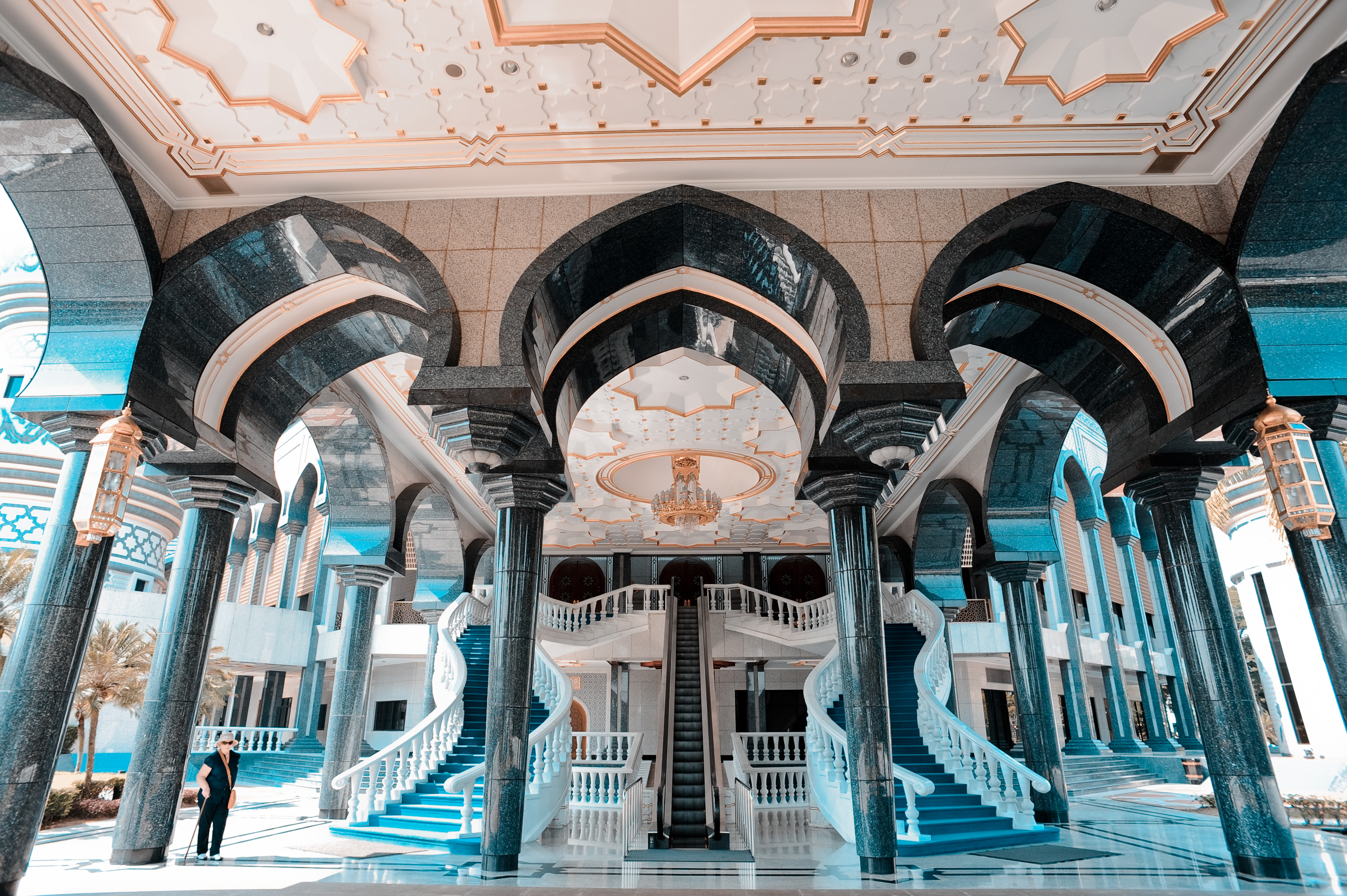
The mosque's main entrance

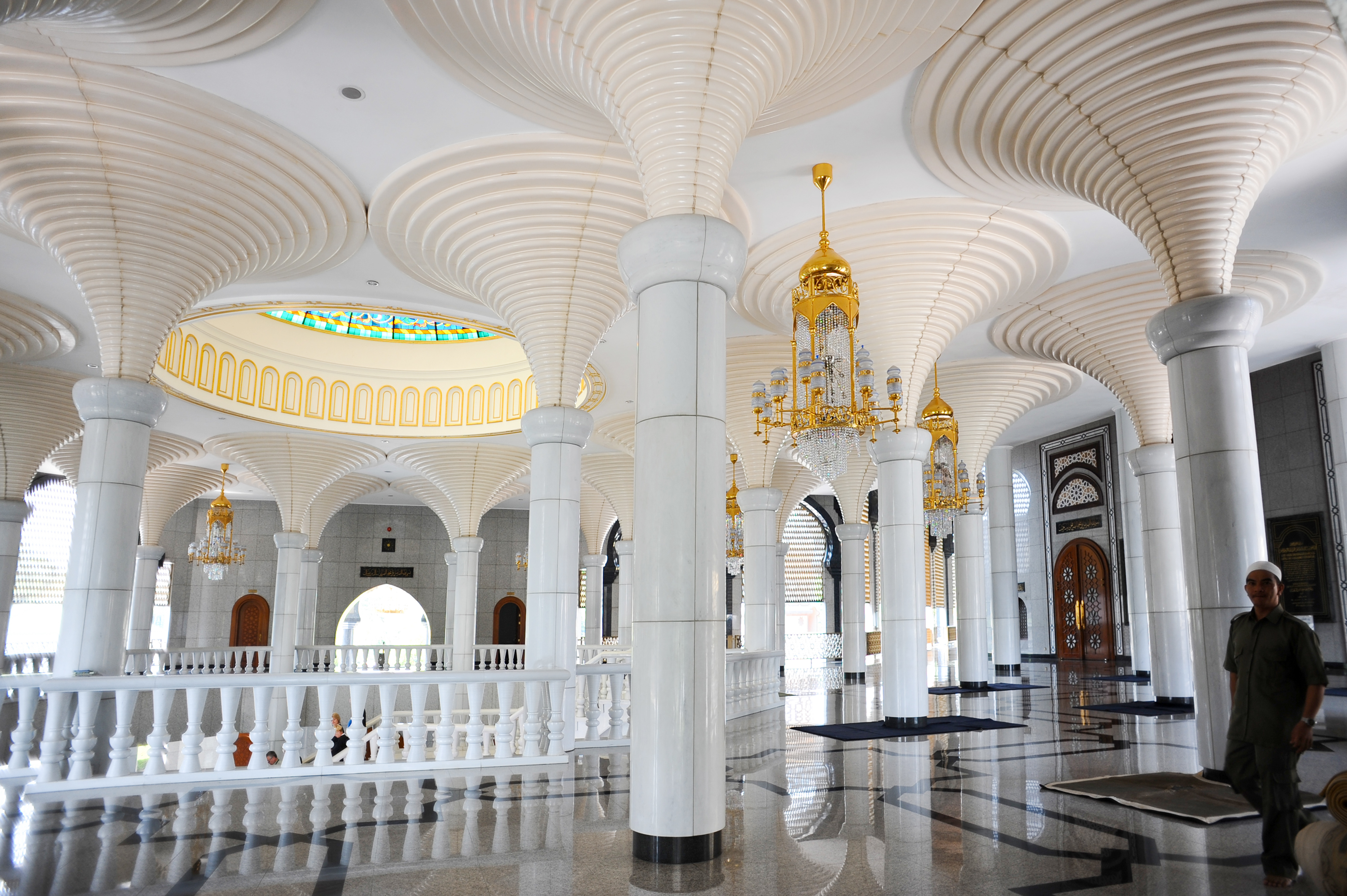
Interior of the mosque; first floor

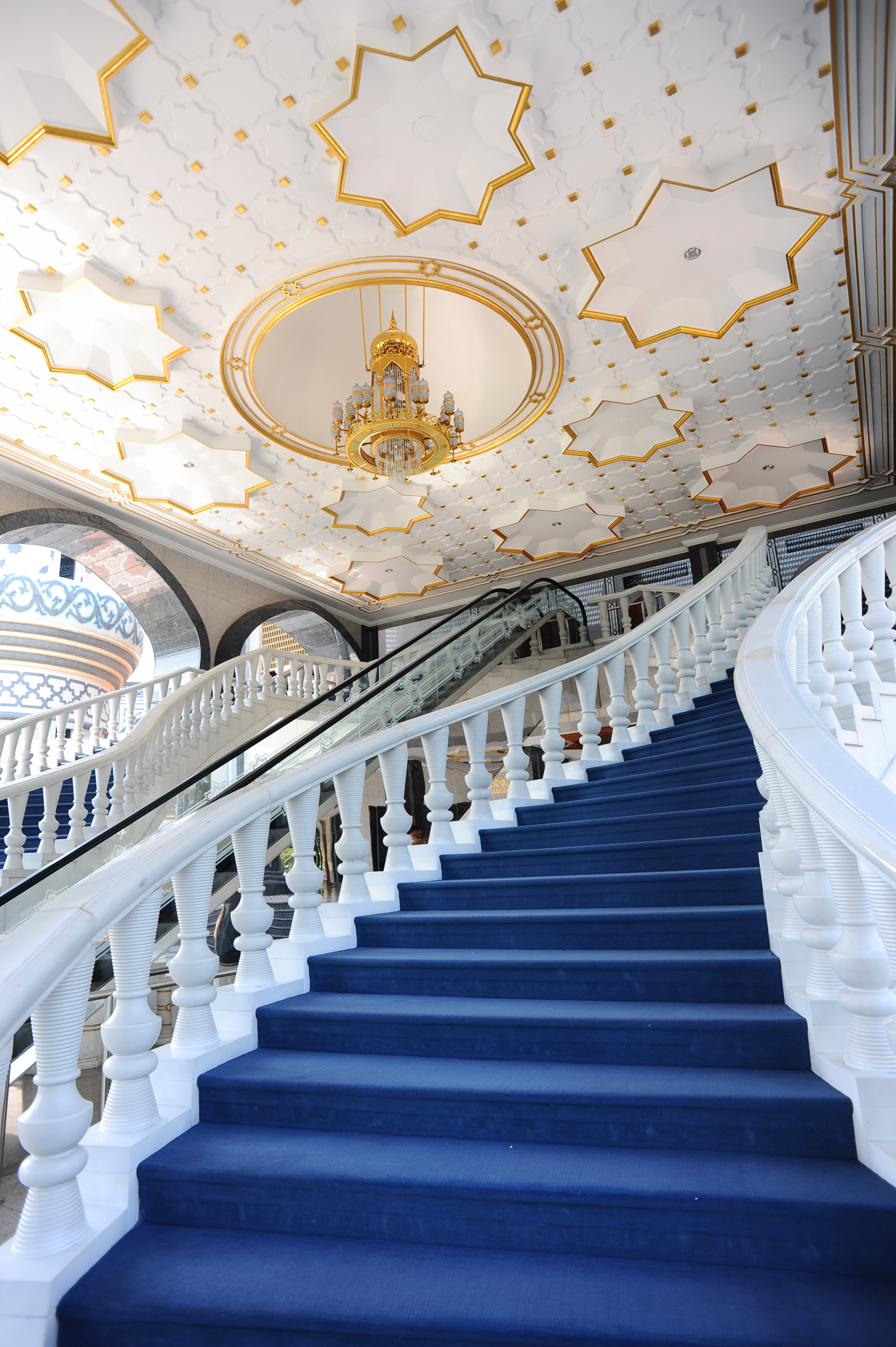
Inside the mosque; close-up of the staircase and escalator

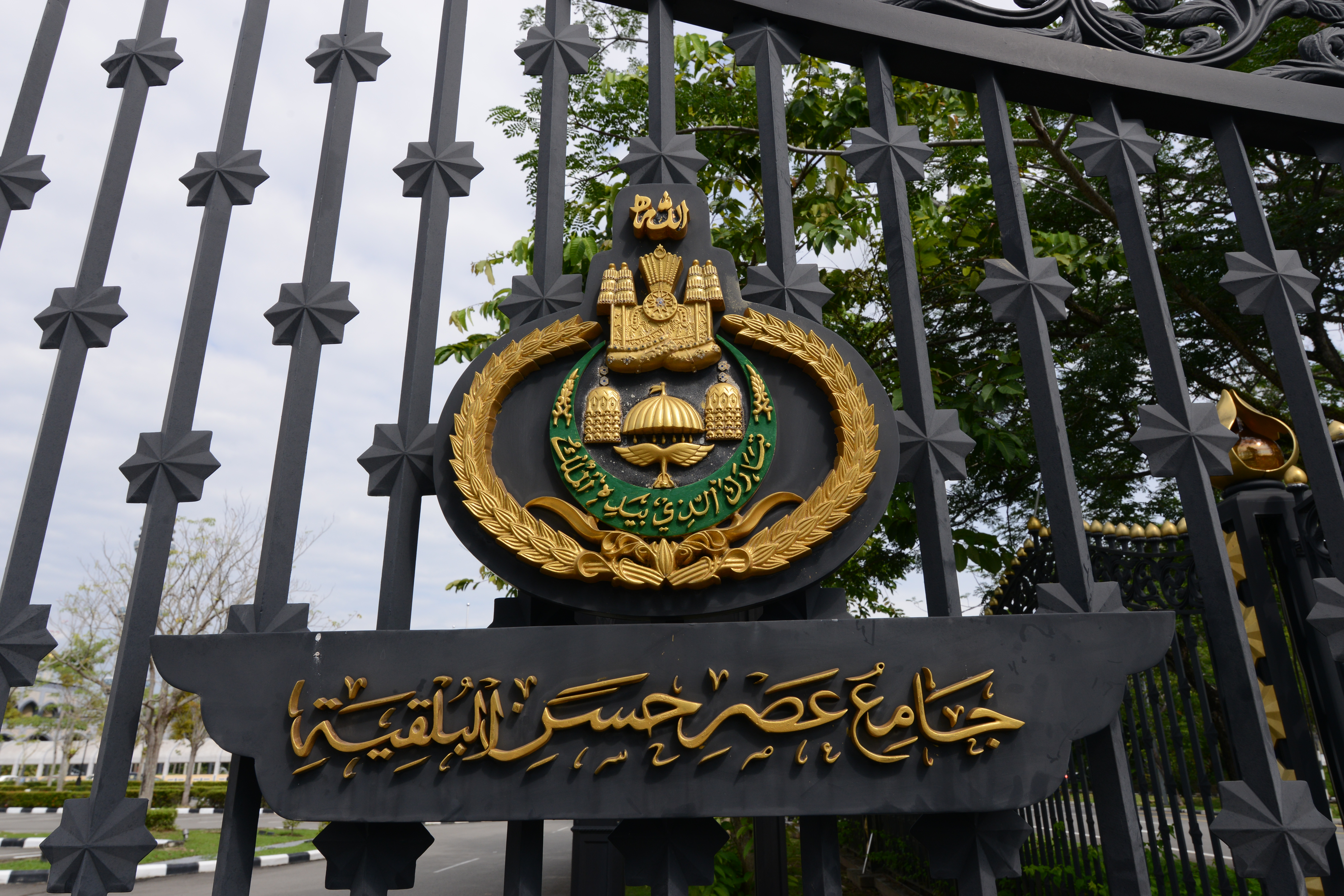
Royal emblem on the gate of the mosque

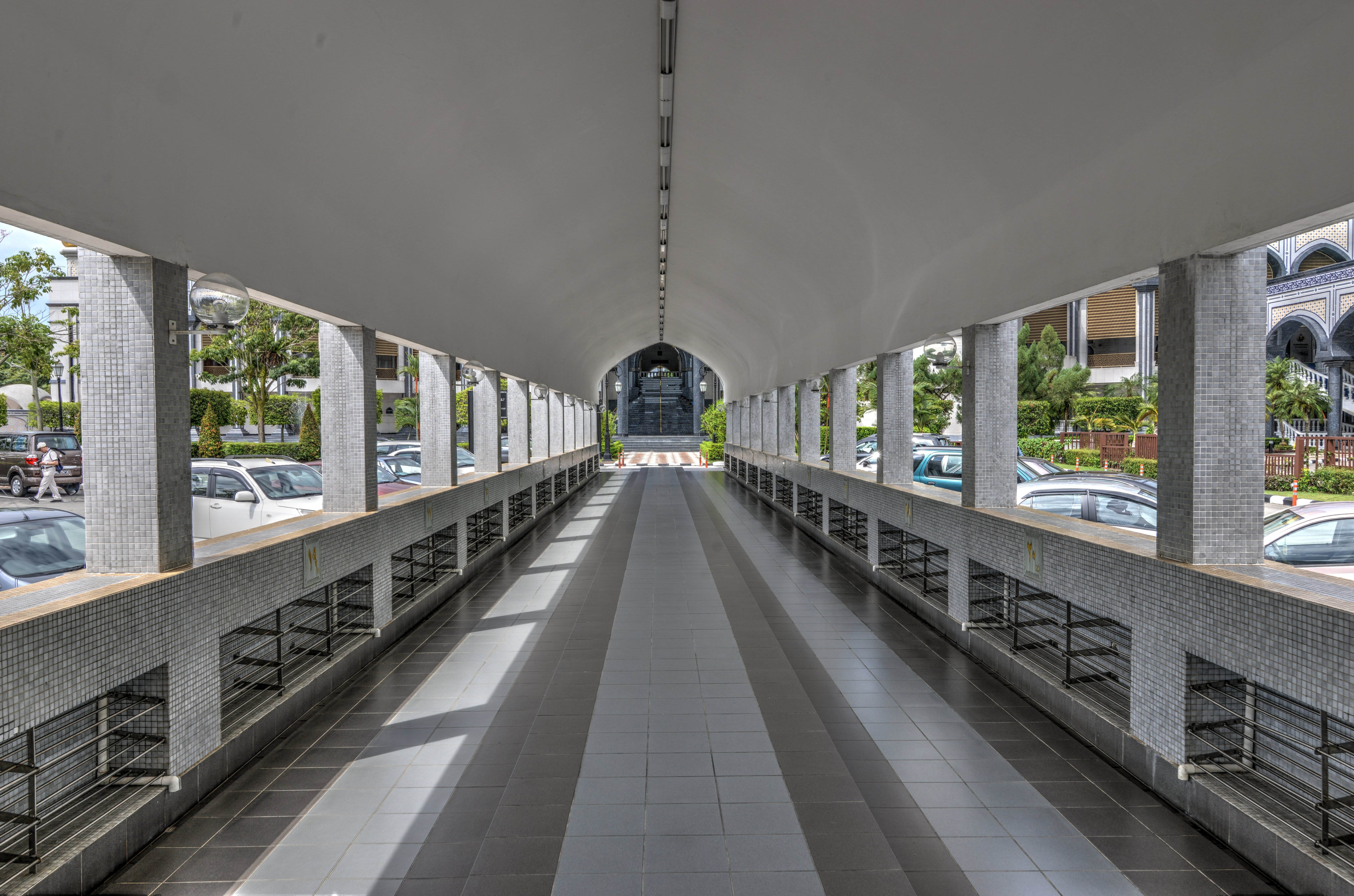
Walkway to the mosque; shoe racks on each side

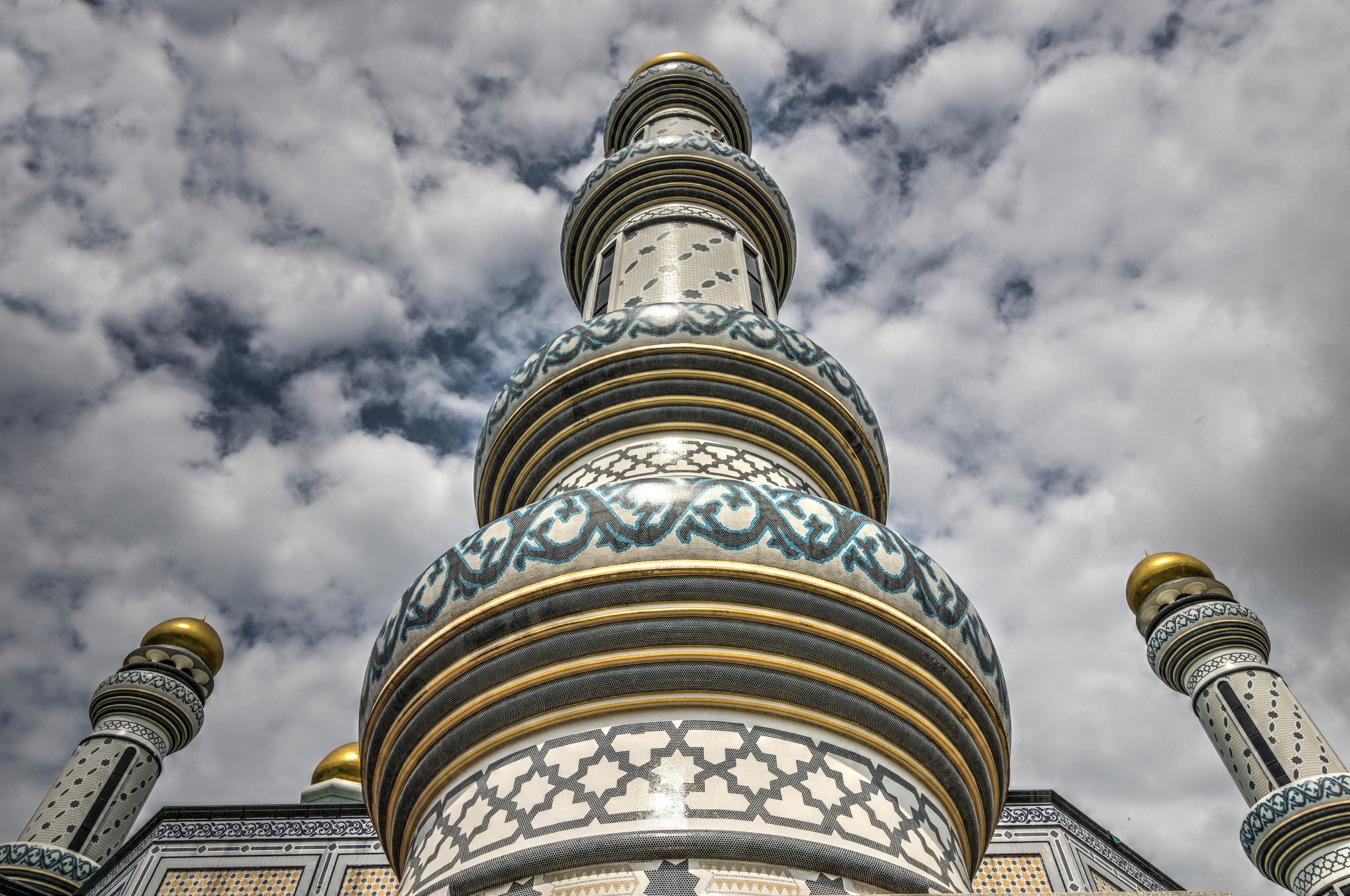
Close-up on one of the minarets
