= Berakas Secondary School =

Secondary school in Serusop, Brunei

- Sekolah Menengah Berakas

Location
- Jalan Muara; Bandar Seri Begawan, BB2314; Brunei; 4.944306°N 114.942083°E

Information
- Former name: Berakas English School
- School type: Government
- Established: c. 1971
- School district: Cluster 3
- Authority: Ministry of Education
- Principal: Hajah Norhashimah binti Haji Burut
- Grades: Years 7-11
- Gender: Coeducational
- Website: Official Instagram
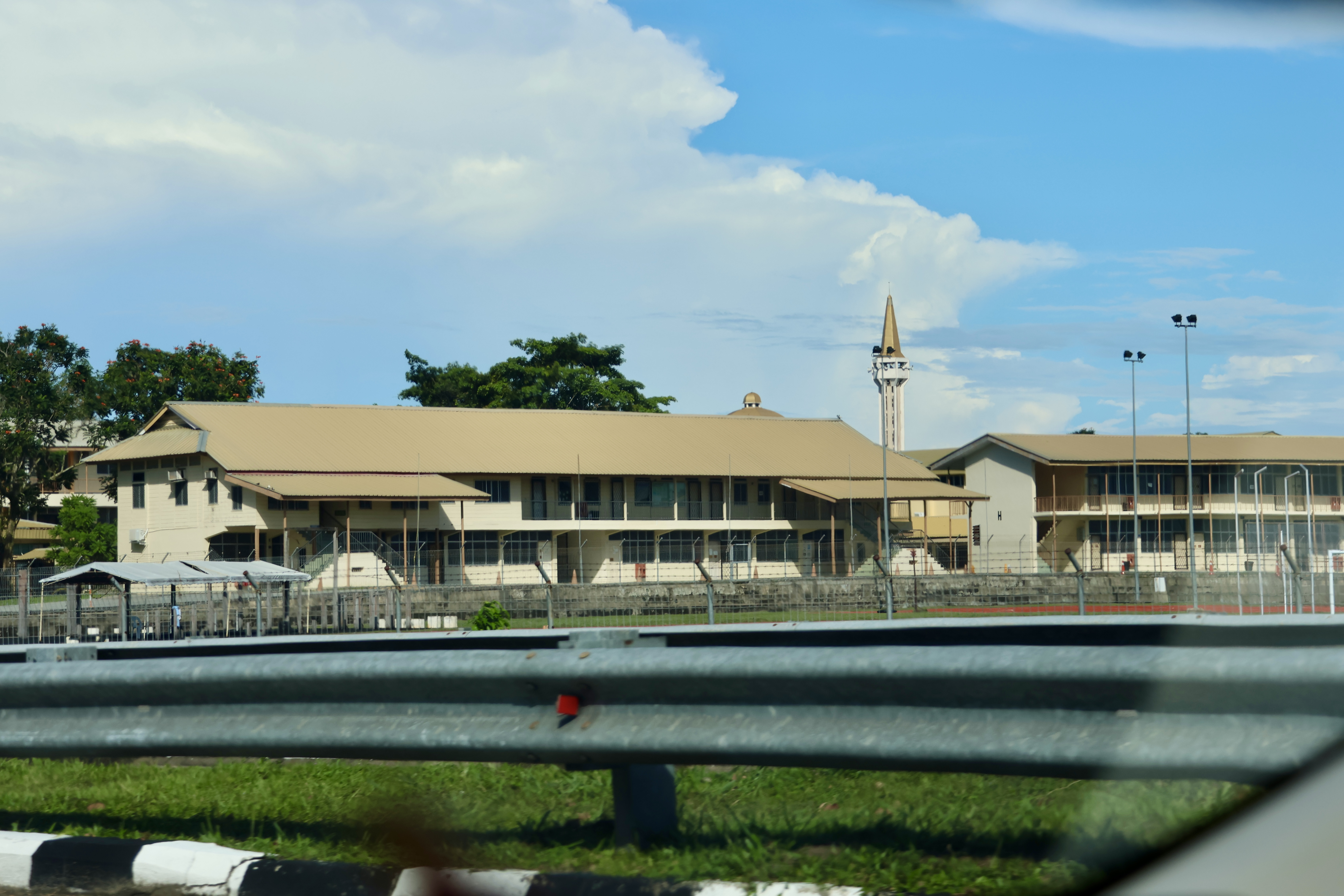
- The school in 2024

Berakas Secondary School (Malay: Sekolah Menengah Berakas, abbreviated as SMB) is a government secondary school located in Kampong Serusop of Bandar Seri Begawan, Brunei. The school provides secondary education leading up to GCE 'O' Level and IGCSE qualifications.

== History ==
The school was established as a full junior secondary school in 1971 as Berakas English School (BES). In 1985, the school was renamed to as it is known today. By January 1976, Berakas English School, which included a little over 400 students in Forms 5, 4, and 3 who were retaking the Brunei Junior Certificate of Education Examination (BJCE) test, had finished moving to the former Detention Camp to deal with the growing student population and lack of classroom space in some schools. On 8 February 1993, Sultan Hassanal Bolkiah visited the school.

== Notable people ==
=== Notable staff ===
- Mustappa bin Sirat, Minister of Communications

=== Notable alumni ===
- Iswandy Ahmad, member of Legislative Council

== See also ==
- List of secondary schools in Brunei
