= Mahmud Saedon =

Bruneian writer (1943–2002)

Dato Paduka Seri Setia Mahmud Saedon PSSUB
- محمود سادون
- Born: 20 December 1943; Kampong Padang, Tutong, Brunei
- Died: 24 June 2002 (aged 58); Raja Isteri Pengiran Anak Saleha Hospital, Bandar Seri Begawan, Brunei
- Resting place: Jame' Asr Hassanil Bolkiah Cemetery, Bandar Seri Begawan, Brunei
- Education: Madrasah Aljunied Al-Islamiah
- Alma mater: Kolej Islam Malaya; Cairo University; Al-Azhar University (PhD)
- Occupations: Writer; muslim scholar
- Political party: PRB (c. 1974)
- Relatives: A. M. Azahari (uncle)

Mahmud Saedon bin Othman (20 December 1943 – 24 June 2002) was a Bruneian writer and Muslim scholar. His proficiency in the legal and Islamic domains, served as the foundation for the nation's giving of diplomas in law and Syar'ie law. Additionally, he was the principal advocate for the progressive reinstatement of syariah laws as the supreme law of the nation and the Islamic Legal Specialist in the Ministry of Religious Affairs (MORA).

== Early life and education ==
On 20 December 1943, in Kampong Padang, Mahmud Saedon was born. Malai Marhani binti Sheikh Mahmud was his mother, and his father was Othman bin Pehin Orang Kaya Perdana Indera Mohammad Jair, a schoolteacher. His early schooling was at the Sultan Muhammad Jamalul Alam Malay School from 1951 to 1954 and Brunei Town Government English School in 1955. The Government of Brunei recognised his academic excellence and gave him a scholarship to study at the Kolej Islam Malaya, and then at the Madrasah Aljunied Al-Islamiah.

Before beginning a career in Islamic Studies at Malaysian institutions, he had been active in the Brunei People's Party (PRB) movement as its Middle East spokesperson. During the PRB's revival in 1974, he was tasked with lobbying the Indonesian government and reestablishing the political ties with Arab Embassies in order to request their material and spiritual assistance, as well as with the Afro-Asian Peoples' Solidarity Organization (AAPSO), which provided political support to A. M. Azahari from 1963 until 1966.

Mahmud Saedon went on to pursue a Bachelor of Arts (BA) at the Al-Azhar University. After earning his basic degree, he decided to pursue a master's degree in Syariah since he had a strong desire to learn more, which he accomplished in 1972. He was not satisfied with that, so he pursued a doctorate in the same subject and was able to earn his Doctor of Philosophy (PhD) in Fiqh Muqaran in 1976. He would go on to become the first individual in the nation to have graduated from Al-Azhar University with a doctorate in the discipline of sharia.

== Career ==
Mahmud Saedon began his career at the National University of Malaysia (UKM) from 1976 to 1983, and worked as a lecturer in the Faculty of Islamic Studies until 1983, at this time he was not allowed to return to Brunei because of his association with PRB. He relocated to the International Islamic University (IIU) in 1984, and stayed there until 1994. IIU promoted him to the position of professor in 1991. He, thus, became the first Bruneian to be elevated to the highest echelon of the academic hierarchy. The International Islamic University of Malaysia (UIAM) appointed him a professor in 1991, and he went on to assume the position of Post-Dean of the UIAM Law Lecture, under Tan Sri Ahmad Ibrahim from 1989 to 1994. He was also one of the people responsible for developing a thorough and integrated Bachelor of Law degree and imparting public law and Islamic law, which has advanced the area of justice in Malaysia.

A group headed by Mahmud Saedon and named the Jawatankuasa Penggubalan Undang-Undang Keluarga lslam (Islamic Family Law Drafting Committee) was established in 1995 with approval from Sultan Hassanal Bolkiah. This committee's primary responsibility is to develop an Islamic Family Law; however, it has also been enlarged to include the enactment of other Islamic laws, such as procedural rules and laws pertaining to the construction of Syariah Courts, which would replace the former Kadi Courts.

After working for eighteen years at Malaysian higher education institutions, Sultan Hassanal Bolkiah consented to his return to Brunei in 1994, and was promptly appointed by the government to the dual positions of Ministry of Religious Affairs' (MORA) Director of the Unit on Islamic Law and Expert in Islamic Jurisprudence from 1998 to 2000 and from 2001 to 2002. Subsequently, he was appointed to the Council of Universiti Brunei Darussalam (UBD). His appointment as UBD's vice-chancellor came next, in May 1999. In addition, he was given the position of professor in shariah by Sultan Haji Omar Ali Saifuddien Institute of Islamic Studies (IPISHOAS), in appreciation of his proficiency in Islamic law. Up until May 2002, he served as UBD's vice-chancellor for a period of three years.

== Political views ==
According to Saedon (1998), Brunei is one of the Islamic countries whose educational systems don't really represent the Islamic ideal. The country's educational system has often continued to adjust to its fast socioeconomic development as of 1989. He advocated for the integration of Islamic ideas and values into Brunei's educational system in his paper, Kurikulum sekolah Mengikut Perspektif Islam: Bentuk dan Kandungannya (School Curriculum Following Islamic Perspective: its Structure and Content), which he presented at that event. Put another way, the development of this national education philosophy need to be consistent with both the educational tenets of Islam and Brunei. Its objectives and the second declaration of The Fifth Educational Development Plan (1986–1990) policy, in his opinion, are at odds.

== Death ==
On 24 June 2002, Mahmud Saedon died. During a meeting of the Islamic Council of Brunei, Malaysia, Indonesia, and Singapore (MABIM), he abruptly fell.

== Works ==
- Ahmad Ibrahim, (Tan Sri, Datuk); Muhammad Kamal Hassan, (Tan Sri) (1990). Islamization of the Malay Archipelago and the Impact of Al-Shafi'is Madhhab on Islamic Teachings and Legislation in Malaysia. International Islamic University Malaysia.
- Kadi: Perlantikan, Perlucutan dan Bidangkuasa (in Malay). Kuala Lumpur: Dewan Bahasa dan Pustaka. 1991.
- Ke arah Mengemaskinikan Mahkamah Syariah di Brunei (in Malay). Pusat Persidangan Antarabangsa, Berakas, Negara Brunei Darussalam. 1995.
- Perlaksanaan dan Pentadbiran Undang-Undang Islam di Negara Brunei Darussalam (in Malay). Brunei: Dewan Bahasa dan Pustaka Brunei. 1996.
- "Akta Mahkamah-Mahkamah Syariah Penggal 184". Journal Undang-Undang Syariah Brunei Darussalam (in Malay). Brunei Darussalam: Dewan Bahasa dan Pustaka. 2000.
- An Introduction to Islamic Law of Evidence. Translated by Raden Hisam, Raden Ahmad Shauki. Open Press. 2000. ISBN 9789679901061.
- Allahyarham Dato Paduka Seri Setia Profesor Dr. Awang Haji Mahmud Saedon bin Awang Othman dalam kenangan (in Malay). Pusat Da'wah Islamiah, Kementerian Hal Ehwal Ugama, Negara Brunei Darussalam. 2003. ISBN 9789991735283.
- Jejak-Jejak (in Malay). Akademi Pengajian Brunei, Universiti Brunei Darussalam. 2003. ISBN 9789991711331.
- Characteristics of Islamic Management. Civil Service Institute, Department of Public Service. 2004.

== Awards and honours ==
In March 2023, Universiti Islam Sultan Sharif Ali (UNISSA) held a ceremony to officially open the Mahmud Saedon Law Collection Room in conjunction with the observance of World Book Day in 2023.

=== Awards ===
- Anugerah Penulisan Islam (API; posthumous 2011)

=== Honours ===
- Order of Islam Brunei First Class (PSSUB) – Dato Paduka Seri Setia

Academic offices
Preceded by Abu Bakar Apong	Vice-Chancellor of Universiti Brunei Darussalam; 1999–2002	Succeeded by Ismail Duraman
