= Iswandy Ahmad =

Bruneian advocate and politician

Iswandy Ahmad PSB PIKB
- اسواندي احمد
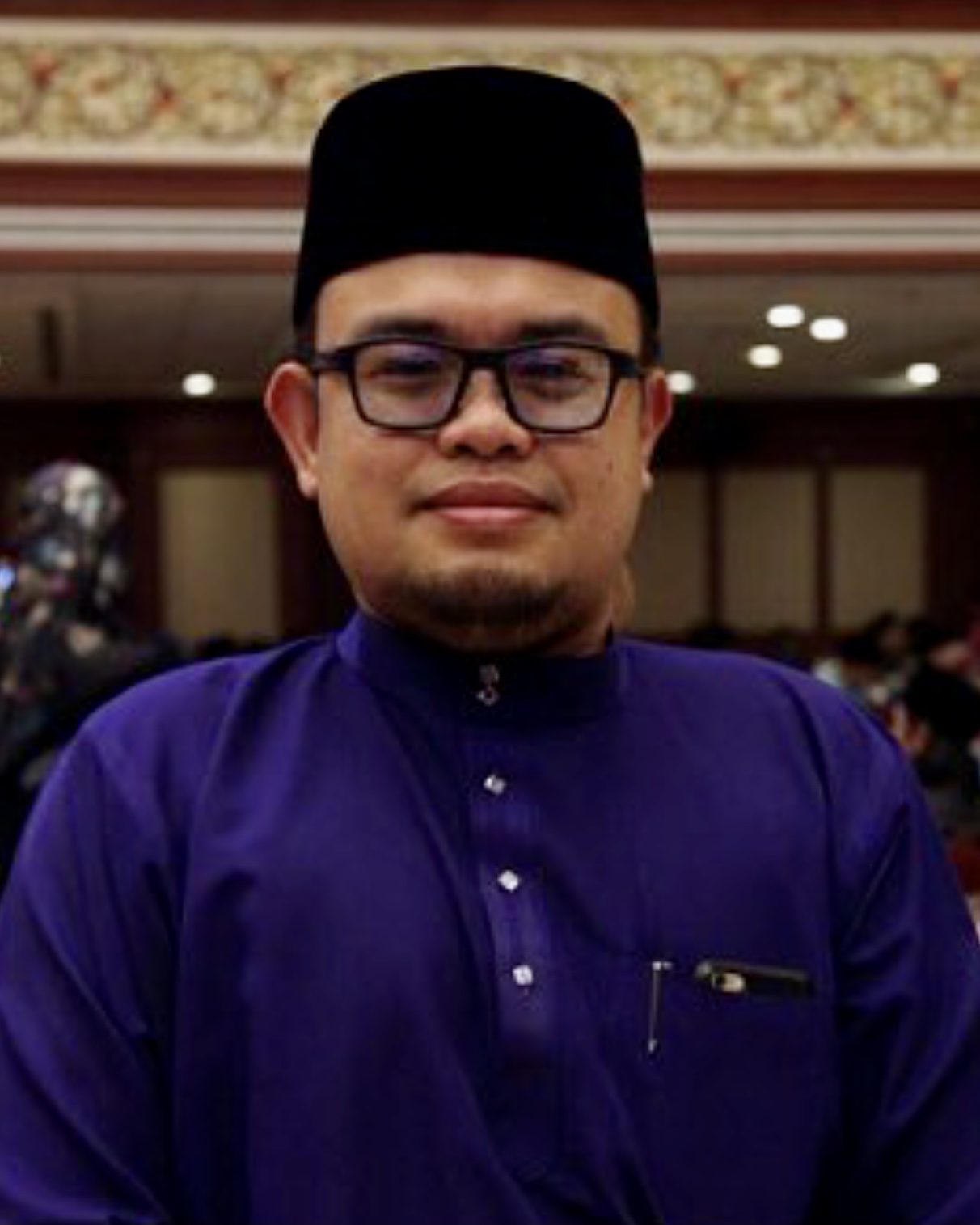
- Iswandy in 2019

Member of the Legislative Council
- In office 13 January 2017 – 6 March 2022

Personal details
- Born: Iswandy bin Ahmad Brunei
- Education: Berakas Secondary School
- Alma mater: Universiti Brunei Darussalam
- Profession: Politician; advocate; teacher

Iswandy bin Ahmad, also referred to as YB Iswandy Ahmad, is a Bruneian advocate and politician who formerly held the position of Member of the Legislative Council of Brunei, under the category of People Who Have Achieved Distinction. He routinely conducts leadership development programs for the country's youth and is a vocal supporter of civil society. His humanitarian service includes work on HIV/AIDS awareness and advocacy, youth mentoring, and job seeker employability. Additionally, he serves as the Lead Trainer at the capacity-building consultancy Perspective Insan Academy (PI).

== Early life and education ==
Iswandy obtained 5 As during my Primary Certificate of Education (PCE), now Primary School Assessment (PSR), exams. For his early education, he went to Berakas Secondary School. He would go on to achieve a master's degree in management, a bachelor's degree in business administration, a diploma in working with youth, and a certificate in teaching lower secondary science. He was required to work at a government school once he had received his education credential, he asked to be stationed in the Temburong District at a school as a bit of a challenge. Instead, he was given the opportunity to join a government school that was only 5 minutes away from his residence. He would eventually decline the offer and accept one from a private school.

== Advocacy ==
With 28 cases confirmed, Brunei has the highest number of new HIV diagnoses in 2015, local media reported on 11 April 2016. According to the council's findings, Iswandy said that more persons participating in "risky behaviors" and increasing public knowledge of HIV were to blame for the increase in HIV diagnoses. The Ministry of Health's attempts to solve the issue should have more assistance from cooperation with other government agencies, he claimed, as the council is worried about the sharp rise in the number of cases. Increased education and awareness about HIV prevention should be a priority, especially among the most vulnerable populations, such as young people and men who have sex with other men.

The second Brunei Young Leaders Convention concluded on 8 August 2019, with a call to youth to enhance their civic participation in order to create a more vibrant local government system. Iswandy Ahmad, acknowledged that youth advocacy has made progress, but highlighted a lack of involvement in local institutions such as village and mukim consultative councils. In an interview, Ahmad emphasized the need for increased engagement in these institutions. He stated that the current managers of village and mukim consultative councils are often elderly, and it is crucial to find successors for them. The firsthand experience gained from grassroots governance is extremely valuable as it involves not only administrative aspects but also the economic aspects of government. Local government holds great importance as it fosters a strong sense of community and concern for their neighbors. While they had considered monitoring the projects led by the youth, they aim for our program alumni to be dynamic and do not want to restrict their projects with unnecessary pressure. The main purpose of the BYLC has always been to act as a catalyst for youth to contribute to the national development.

The second iteration of Brunei's inaugural human capital conference, INITIATE, would take place on 19 May 2022, with a focus on creating a resilient workplace culture in the new normal. According to Iswandy, the founder of Perspective Insan, the summit's subject will focus on how working culture has changed, the need for resilience, and what the future of work will be as the nation recovers from the COVID-19 epidemic.

=== HIV Awareness Programme for Peers & Youth ===
His duties as the alumni coordinator at the U.S. Embassy in Bandar Seri Begawan included encouraging more communication and collaboration among program graduates, as well as organizing and managing youth and alumni groups. He is also one of the founders of the HIV Awareness Programme for Peers & Youth (HAPPY), which has trained more than 5000 young people since it was launched by the Brunei Darussalam AIDS Council in 2007. The HAPPY Project has also received honors including the Youth Project Award, B-@aktif silver medal, and Commonwealth Youth Silver Award.

=== Brunei Darussalam AIDS Council ===
On 6 December 2015, the World AIDS Day (WAD) 2015 event, the RED (Re-educate, Empower and Destigmatise): A Red Ribbon Campaign event was taking place. The AIDS council president was speaking on the sidelines of the event. Iswandy said that the council observed the rise in new HIV infections from two angles. The council does not specifically target any group with its programs, in addition. He continued by saying that their strategy has always been bottoms up, starting with local leaders and the community.

Iswandy Ahmad, president of the Brunei Darussalam AIDS Council (BDAIDSC), stated that empowering volunteers to manage events and programs is one of the council's methods for bettering the lives of its constituents. The BDAC will support and direct the members and volunteers to execute a successful event, but they are free to plan and manage their own programs and activities. He clarified that BDAC enables volunteers to express their thoughts and wishes, and that BDAC will support them in accomplishing their goals on 11 February 2016.

Iswandy was re-elected as president of the BDAIDSC during the most recent annual general meeting at the Health Promotion Centre (HPC) in 2023, and he continues to lead the organization.

== Personal life ==
Iswandy is married and together they have a son. He found his father being the most influential person in his life because of his teachings and guide. He also works at the Brunei Methanol Company (BMC) as their Stakeholder Relation Officer.

== Recognition and awards ==
Recognition and awards of Iswandy include:

- Order of Setia Negara Brunei Fourth Class (PSB)
- Excellent Service Medal (PIKB; 2016)
- ASEAN Youth Award (2009)
- Youth Service Award (2010)
