= Kampong Serusop =

Serusop Kampung Serusop
- Village
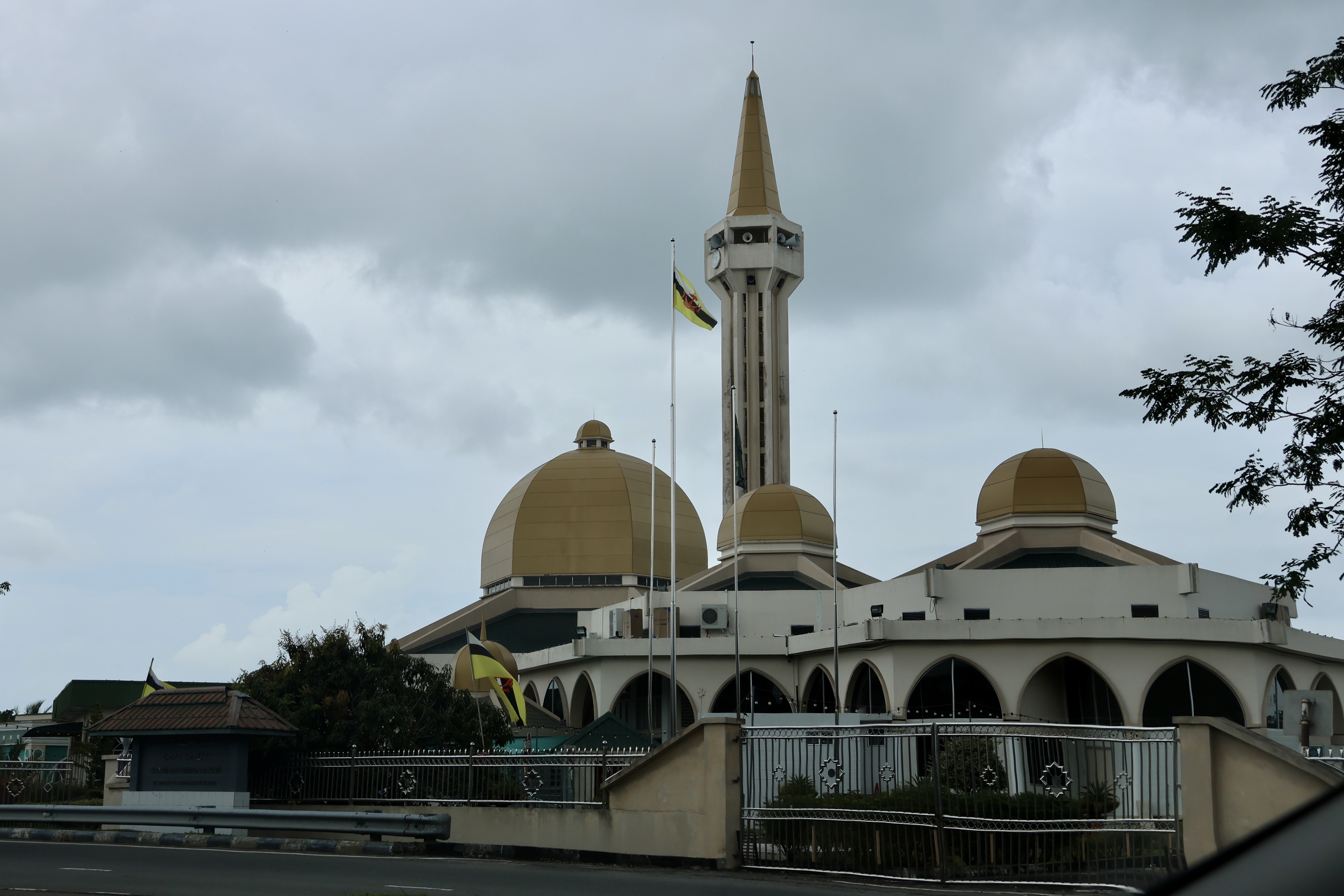
- Mohamed Bolkiah Mosque

- Location in Brunei
- Coordinates: 4°56′48″N 114°56′38″E
- Country: Brunei
- District: Brunei-Muara
- Mukim: Berakas 'A'

Population (2016)
  - Total: 1,474
- Time zone: UTC+8 (BNT)
- Postcode: BB2313

Kampong Serusop (Malay: Kampung Serusop) or simply known as Serusop, is a village in Brunei-Muara District, Brunei, and a neighbourhood in the capital Bandar Seri Begawan. The population was 1,474 in 2016. It is one of the villages within Mukim Berakas 'A'. The postcode is BB2313.

== Infrastructure ==
The village is home to the Berakas Secondary School, Paduka Seri Begawan Sultan Science College and Pengiran Anak Puteri Muta-Wakkilah Hayatul Bolkiah Religious School.

The village mosque is Mohamed Bolkiah Mosque; it was inaugurated by Sultan Hassanal Bolkiah on 23 November 1979. The mosque can accommodate 3,000 worshippers.

== Notable people ==
- Ali Mohammad Daud (1936–2018), a politician and diplomat
- Abdul Aziz Umar (born 1936), a politician and civil servant
