= Ethnic Chinese in Brunei =

Ethnic group

Chinese: 汶萊華人 Malay: Orang Cina di Brunei; اورڠ چينا د بروني
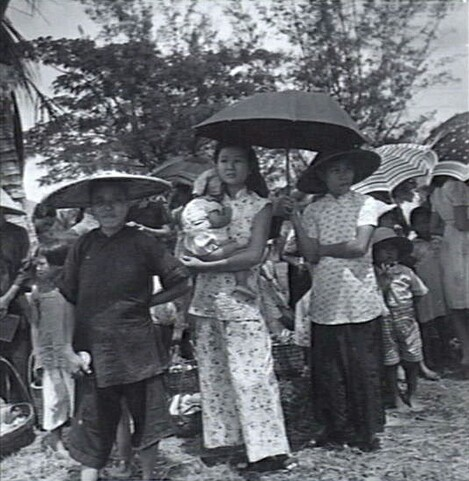
- Chinese women and children in Kuala Belait, 1945.

Total population
- 42,132; 9.6% of the Bruneian population (2021)

Languages
- English and Malay as medium of communication in schools and government • Mandarin (lingua franca) • Chinese varieties such as Hokkien, Cantonese, Teochew, Hainanese, Hakka

Religion
- Buddhism • Taoism • Chinese folk religion • Islam • Christian Protestant

Related ethnic groups
- Singaporean Chinese · Malaysian Chinese · Indonesian Chinese · Overseas Chinese

Ethnic Chinese in Brunei are individuals of full or partial Chinese descent, primarily Han Chinese, who are either citizens or residents of the country. In 2015, they make up 15% of Brunei's population and as of 2020, make up just over 10%. Brunei is home to one of the smaller overseas Chinese communities, with many Chinese people in the country being stateless.

== History ==
=== Early interactions ===
According to the Taiping Huanyu Ji, Brunei (Boni) was one of the earliest kingdoms in Southeast Asia, having sent its first envoy to China in 977. Evidence of Song dynasty ceramics and Chinese brass coins from the 13th century also indicated Chinese presence within the area. Relationship between early Brunei and China is also evident with the story of Ong Sum Ping, a Chinese official, who married the daughter of Muhammad Shah, Sultan of Brunei at the time.

Due to the Chola invasion of Srivijaya and trade restructuring by the Northern Song, trade within Southeast Asia decreased. It wasn't until 1082 that Brunei finally sent a second embassy to China. After the collapse of the Chola Empire in 1150 and trade remodeling by Srivijaya, trade grew in the area and Brunei was recorded in Chinese texts in 1151 and 1206. By 1225, Brunei's significance in the Nanyang trade was noted by Zhao Rukuo. At the time, the country's main exports were tortoise shells and camphor which they exchanged for Chinese fabrics and pottery. Islam began spreading through Quanzhou, and by the 13th century, records show the presence of Chinese Muslims in Brunei, including a merchant named Master Pu. A Spanish source from 1578 also confirms the existence of a mosque and Muslim rulers in Brunei, where both Chinese and indigenous populations had converted to Islam.

Trade between China and Brunei continued till the second half of the 13th century. With the fall of Singhasari by the Mongols in 1292, Majapahit began to engage trading with Brunei at during the second half of the 14th century. After a raid by the Sulu chiefdom which were eventually stopped with Javanese help, Brunei moved its capital from Limau Manis to Kota Batu.

After a renewed maritime policy in 1368 by Emperor Hongwu of the Ming dynasty, the empire sent an emissary in 1370, which was responded by Brunei's own envoy the year afterward. Brunei wouldn't send another delegate to Nanjing until the end of the century. After Admiral Zheng He's expedition to the region, Brunei sent an envoy to Nanjing in 1405. The mountain overlooking Brunei was given the title of "everlasting protector of the country", the name possibly being the origin of the name Darussalam.

Trade between Brunei and the Ming dynasty grew substantially after the Ming's removal of their trade restriction in 1567. Among the items imported included silk materials, gold, ceramics, and second-hand iron, while exporting goods including bird's nests, slaves, wax, pearls, bezoar stones, camphor. A small Chinese community in Tanjung Batu and Muara mainly controlled these trades. After the Spanish attack in 1570 and the loss of the Manila vassalage in 1571 trade between the two decreased which benefited Sulu and Manila. While negotiations were sent by Sultan Muhammad to the Spanish to draw back Chinese traders and settlers back into the region, and an embassy was sent to Brunei in 1685, it ultimately failed due to Spanish insisting on sending Chinese settlers accompanied solely by Catholic priests.

After a maritime trade ban was lifted by the Qing conquest of Taiwan, trade resumed between Brunei and Southern China, helping Chinese farmers to settle along the Brunei River to cultivate peppers at the end of the first decade of the 18th century. Even after the decline of the Brunei Sultanate after 1720, The Chinese maintained trade by sending Junks from Amoy and Macau. Around 500-600 tons of junks were built on the Brunei River by Chinese carpenters.

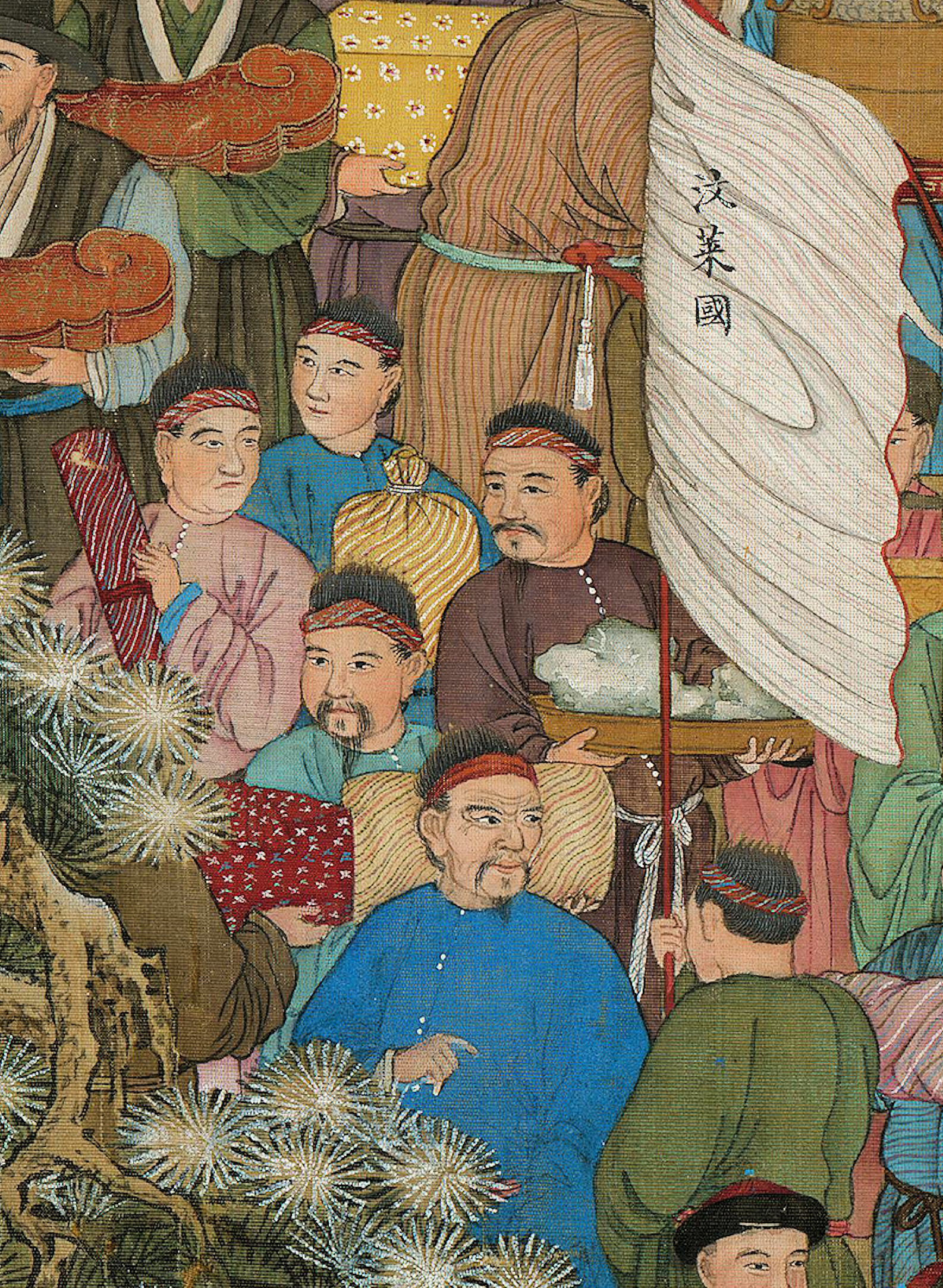
Artwork from 万国来朝图, depicting a Brunei delegation in Beijing, 1761

After 1810, Chinese junks deserted the Brunei Bay due to a lack of support from British and Spanish forces against pressure from Sulu sending Balangigi and Iranun raids. Interest in trading within the region resurfaced after antimony was found in Sarawak. The sultan sent an embassy to Singapore and brought the newly found mineral with them in 1824. Three years later, he nominated Pengiran Indera Mahkota as the new governor of Sarawak. He founded Kuching and established mines around the area with the help of Chinese labor. Disputes between Pengiran Muda Hashim and Pengiran Muhammad Salleh eventually led to James Brooke intervening. A large part of Brunei had been lost and when they eventually gave sovereign rights to British, the Chinese population had almost disappeared in 1906.

In 1904, Malcolm Stewart Hannibal McArthur estimmated around 500 Chinese living in Brunei, 20 times less than in 1800 based on the lowest estimates at the time. McArthur overestimated the population by around a third, so the number would have likely been closer to 300, most of which were registered as British subjects in Labuan. Chinese still dominated trade in the region, with retail and commodity trade such as sago, rattan, and other goods to Singapore.

"…there are probably 500 Chinese in the State.Most of them are registered as British Subjects… Their numbers would hardly justify their separate mentionin this report if it were not for the fact that almost all the trade and practically all the revenue of the country are in their hands… The principal traders of the countrywere Chinese…"

— James McArthur, 1904

Between 1911 and 1921, the Chinese population in Brunei doubled, rising from 3% to 5% of the total population due to improved healthcare. In 1912, the first Chinese primary school, Yik Chye School (now Chung Hwa Middle School), opened and taught Mandarin which was unusual at the time as most schools opted for dialects. Due to the compulsory of education for boys in 1929, five private Chinese primary schools were erected by 1941. The first Chinese temple was also built by the Qemoy here after they arrived in 1918.

The Chinese population tripled after the discovery of oil in Seria in 1929 the Chinese made up a fifth of the population. In 1939, the first Hainanese Association was founded in Belait. The Japanese Invasion of 1941 stopped the economic growth and killed the Chinese residents. Most of the population survived after the retreat.

=== Post-war economy and policies ===
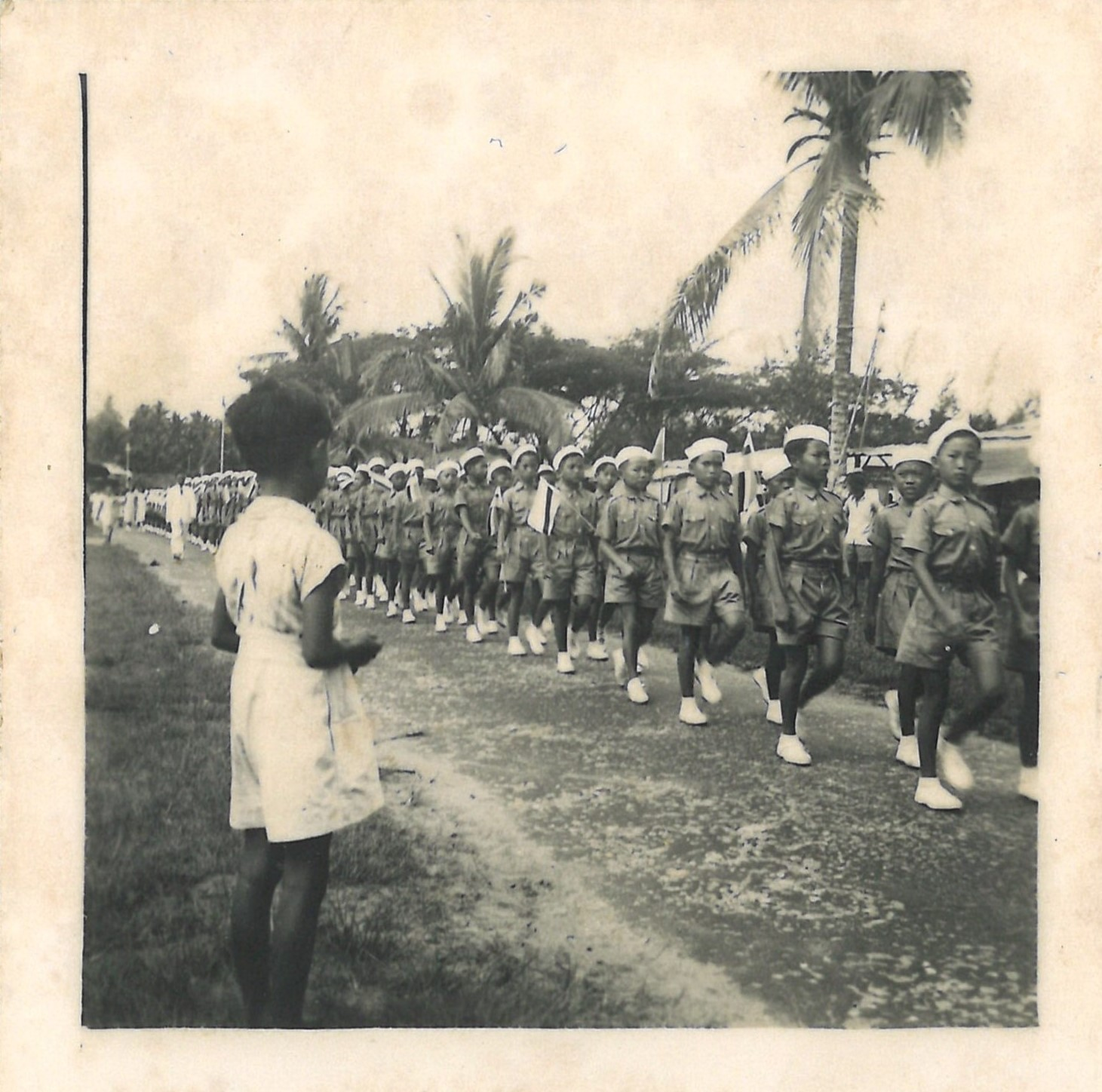
Chinese students marching to the court house to welcome Sultan Ahmad Tajuddin in 1949

Tensions between the Chinese and Malays in Brunei intensified after the British civil authority came back in July 1946. Strikes were held by Chinese workers on the Seria oil field due to daily food shortages. This was further worsen with Pengiran Bendahara, Sultan Ahmad Tajuddin's brother, supporting the Barisan Pemuda nationalist group (BARIP) which also included the radical Kumpulan Ganyang China (Group for Crushing the Chinese). The group demanded the recruitment of Malays in the administration which was still mostly held by English-speaking Chinese. BARIP also forced Chinese shops to close during the funeral of the sultan's mother's in 1947.

Between 1947 and 1960, Brunei's Chinese population made up around 26% of the total population, largely due to the oil boom. The Chinese Chamber of Commerce (CCC) was founded in 1947 due to the boom. Other geo-dialectal associations were established, which were the Malaysian Chinese Fuzhoa association of the Brunei branch and the Brunei Hakka Association in 1955 and 1960 respectively. During this time, immigration by the Chinese decreased, with 20% of the population being Chinese in 1981 compared to 23% in 1971 (half of which lived in Belait).

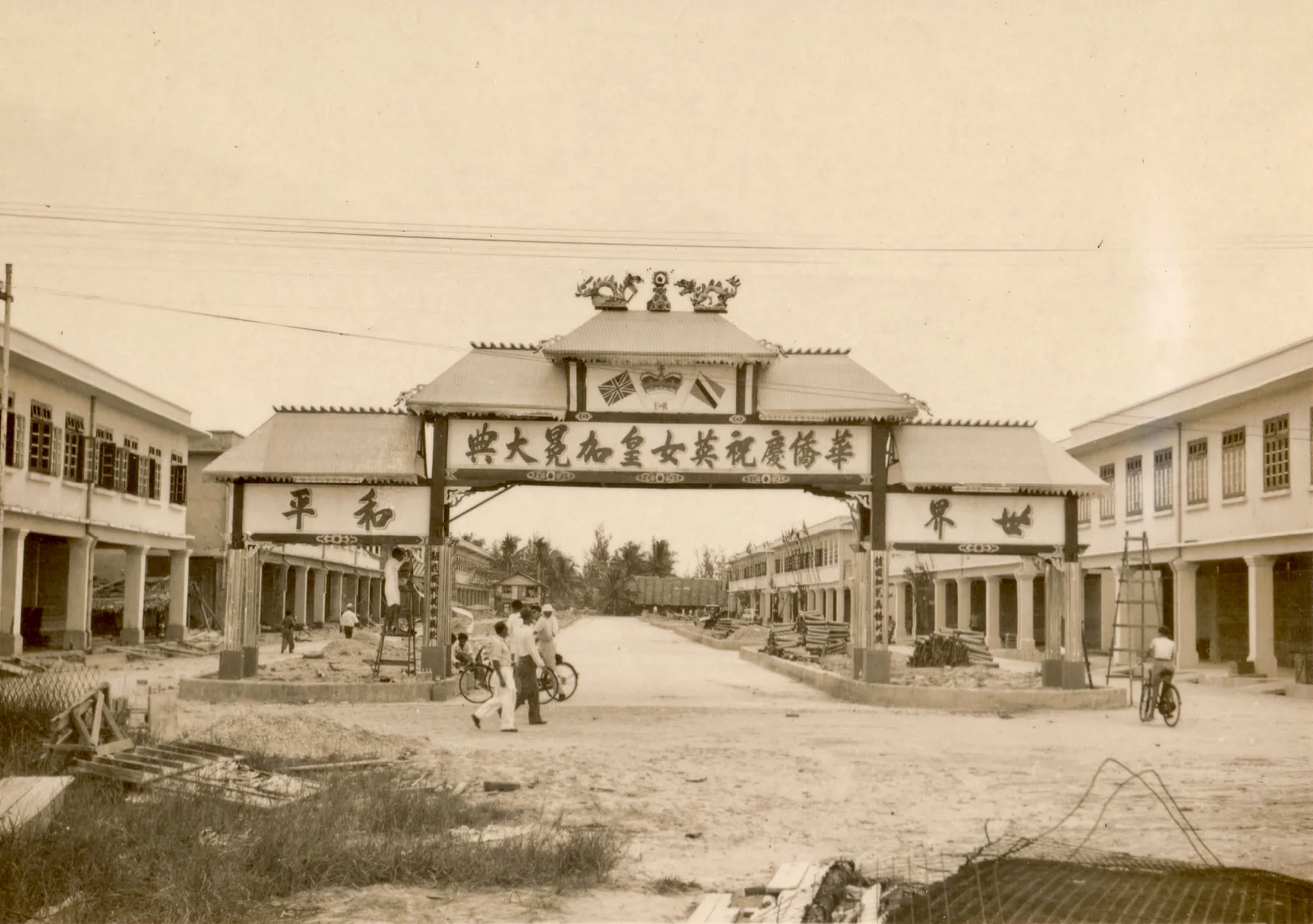
Chinese pai lou over Jalan Pretty, Kuala Belait celebrating the coronation of Elizabeth II in 1953

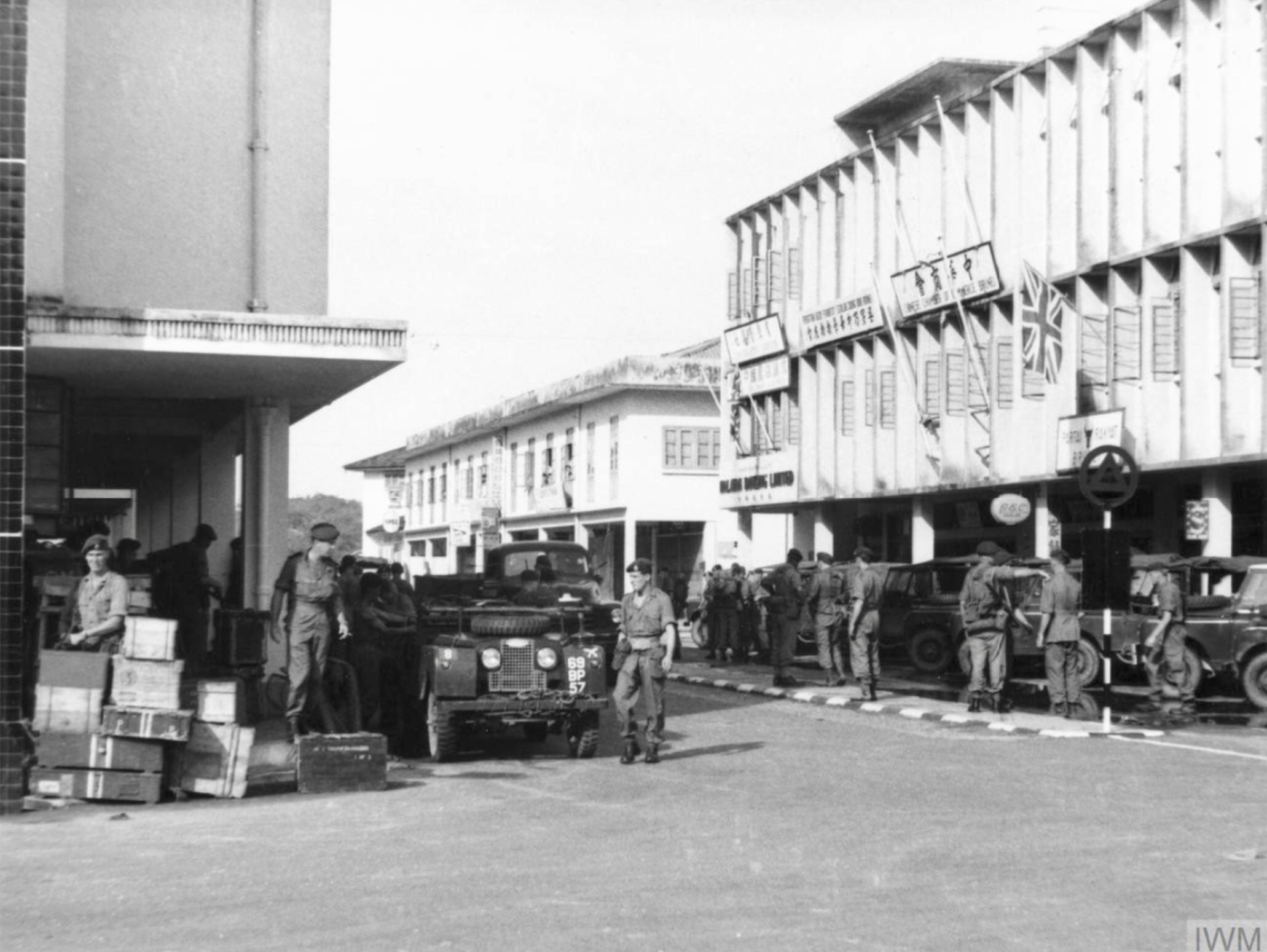
Chinese shophouses and British soldiers during the 1962 Brunei revolt

By 1971, 75% of Chinese worked in construction, administration and trade. With construction being the primary sector where they were emloyed, the Brunei Construction Association and the Chinese Engineering Association were founded in 1964 and 1976 respectively. Chinese were also engaged in the banking sector with the United National Finance bank established in 1975, 11 years after Khoo Teck Puat's National Bank of Brunei was founded. Chinese associations also began to emerge due to the financial growth, notable the Hainanese Association's Brunei Town branch in 1968, the Taiwan Graduates Association in 1970, the Brunei Tai Poo Association (Hakka), and the Brunei Qiong Zhou Association (Hainanese), both founded in the late 1970s and the Brunei Kwong Wai Siew Association (Cantonese).

With increased wealth from oil revenues, Chinese citizens were more restricted to owning land due to the Sultan's power. as leasing the land was under the Sultan. Chinese were unofficially permitted to only 2 acres (0.81 ha) of land. Even with approval, the land acquisitions could still not be registered. To avoid further tensions, the protection of non-Islamic rights were reaffirmed by the Sultan and the Chinese were given a chance to show their expertise to the Malays. Further recognition also included the Sultan's attendance at the CCC's annual birthdat banquet in September 1983 and the appointment of Lim Jock Seng, a Chinese Bruneian as secretary for ASEAN affairs.

=== Independence ===
Chinese citizens were further restricted after a royal titah was given to promote the concept of Melayu Islam Beraja (MIB) to the country's official ideology during the independence celebration on 31 December 1983. Initially, Chinese schools were allowed to continue using Chinese as an education medium even as bilingual teachings in Malay and English were introduced after the creation of an MIB committee in 1985. Due to the rise of Islamic fundamentalism, the MIB was more strictly enforced and declared to be God's will in 1990. Chinese were no longer used in courses to make way for Malay and English in 1992 and the contents of Chinese courses turned into additional subjects and have to be prepared by the Ministry of Education. By the 2000s, the Chinese language had declined significantly. All leaders and board members of Chinese associations were required to be Bruneians in a 2005 regulation, further controlling the Chinese population in the country.

Discrimination against Chinese citizens became rampant, with Brunei Malay's increasingly using MIB to further relegate the Chinese in the economy. By 2001, the population decreased to 11%, dropping from 20.5% in 1981 due to state-controlled hydrocarbon sectors and businesses supported by the royal family. Emigration led to more decrease of the population, with 40,621 Chinese in 1991 compared to 37,056 in 2001. The population however had increased to approximately 43,700 by 2009, the majority being Hokkien and mostly living in the Brunei–Muara District.

Actively employed Chinese citizens in Brunei made up around 44.7% of the population, compared to 32.6% of the Malay population. 25% of Chinese workers held high-skilled occupations, 30% in skilled fields, and 30% worked in traditional work. The contrast with Malay workers are mainly due to young educated Chinese citizens leaving the country for work abroad and the restriction of only citizens could retire in Brunei, leading to retirees to leave the contry.

== Demographics ==
The Hokkien largely dominate the group. Smaller percentages of the Chinese population are Hakka, Cantonese, Hainanese and others.

== Society ==
=== Identity ===
MIB rejects pluralism and institutionalises a monocultural Malay Muslim identity. Although Brunei does not embrace multi-racialism, Zain Serudin, in The Malay Islamic Monarchy: A Closer Understanding (2013), argues this stance is not inherently anti-Malay. He advocates openness to new values that contribute to the nation's success while cautioning against external influences. This highlights Brunei's ambivalent stance on multiculturalism, reflecting both the perceived threats and potential benefits of non-Malay communities, particularly the Brunei Chinese, who are often viewed with suspicion and positioned as the alienated "other."

The treatment of Brunei's Chinese population underscores broader issues surrounding the construction of "citizen" and "stateless" identities. Under MIB principles, Malay ethnicity is central to Brunei's definition of citizenship, which signifies both legal status and belonging. This creates a disparity: the Brunei Nationality Act (1961) automatically grants citizenship to recognised Malay indigenous communities, while non-Malays must apply through registration or naturalisation. Government policies further reinforce the privileged status of Brunei Malays as "authentic" locals and natural heirs to the sultanate, conflating Malayness with indigeneity and Islam. This framework marginalises non-Malay minorities like the Brunei Chinese by tying citizenship to ethnic and cultural identity.

Brunei's citizenship policy is based on the concept of a "community of descent," where citizenship is determined by lineage (jus sanguinis) rather than birthplace (jus soli). (Note: As of 1986, it was estimated that over 90% were unable to obtain Bruneian citizenship, despite generations of residence in the country.) Native identity is validated through ancestry, with Brunei Malays—referred to as pribumi, bumiputera, or anak Brunei—enjoying privileged citizenship since independence as part of the sultanate's historical heritage. This system exemplifies "racialised citizenship," characterised by preferential treatment for Brunei Malays and institutionalised discrimination against other ethnic groups.

While Malays are granted automatic full citizenship, Chinese residents face an uncertain status. Following independence, only a third of Chinese residents were granted citizenship, leaving the majority stateless. Before independence, most Chinese were classified as British protected persons. Stateless Chinese must meet strict requirements to apply for citizenship, including passing a notoriously difficult Malay language test and residing in the country for 20 out of the past 25 years. (Note: The complex Malay language test, which reportedly demands a thorough understanding of the names of regional flora and fauna, has been accused of discriminating against non-native speakers, including Chinese.) The language test remains the primary barrier, and even those who pass it often face prolonged bureaucratic delays. As a result, despite many Chinese residents being second- or third-generation, up to 90% remain stateless. As of 2022, Chinese residents make up 10.3% of Brunei's population.

In Brunei, "stateless" status has multiple implications. Stateless individuals, recognised as permanent residents through their purple identity cards, are allowed to live in the country but are excluded from key citizenship privileges such as property ownership, obtaining a passport, and accessing government benefits. (Note: In addition to being stateless, many Chinese people are still denied access to certain facets of society, such as land ownership and subsidised healthcare. Many have been unable to get citizenship due to discrimination and the ongoing implementation of the strict Malay language requirement set forth in the Brunei National Act (1961).) Citizenship, symbolised by a yellow identity card, is highly coveted as it grants access to free healthcare, education, and property rights. However, distinctions persist even among Bruneian Chinese. Non-Muslim Chinese citizens are categorised as Cina Brunei or Cina Kitani, while those who convert to Islam and assimilate fully may be recognised as orang Melayu Brunei. Yet even with citizenship, Chinese individuals often face second-class treatment due to informal ethnic and racial hierarchies. This disparity is further accentuated by preferential policies for Malays, such as land resettlement schemes, underscoring Brunei's uneasy relationship with its Chinese population.

=== Economic aptitude ===
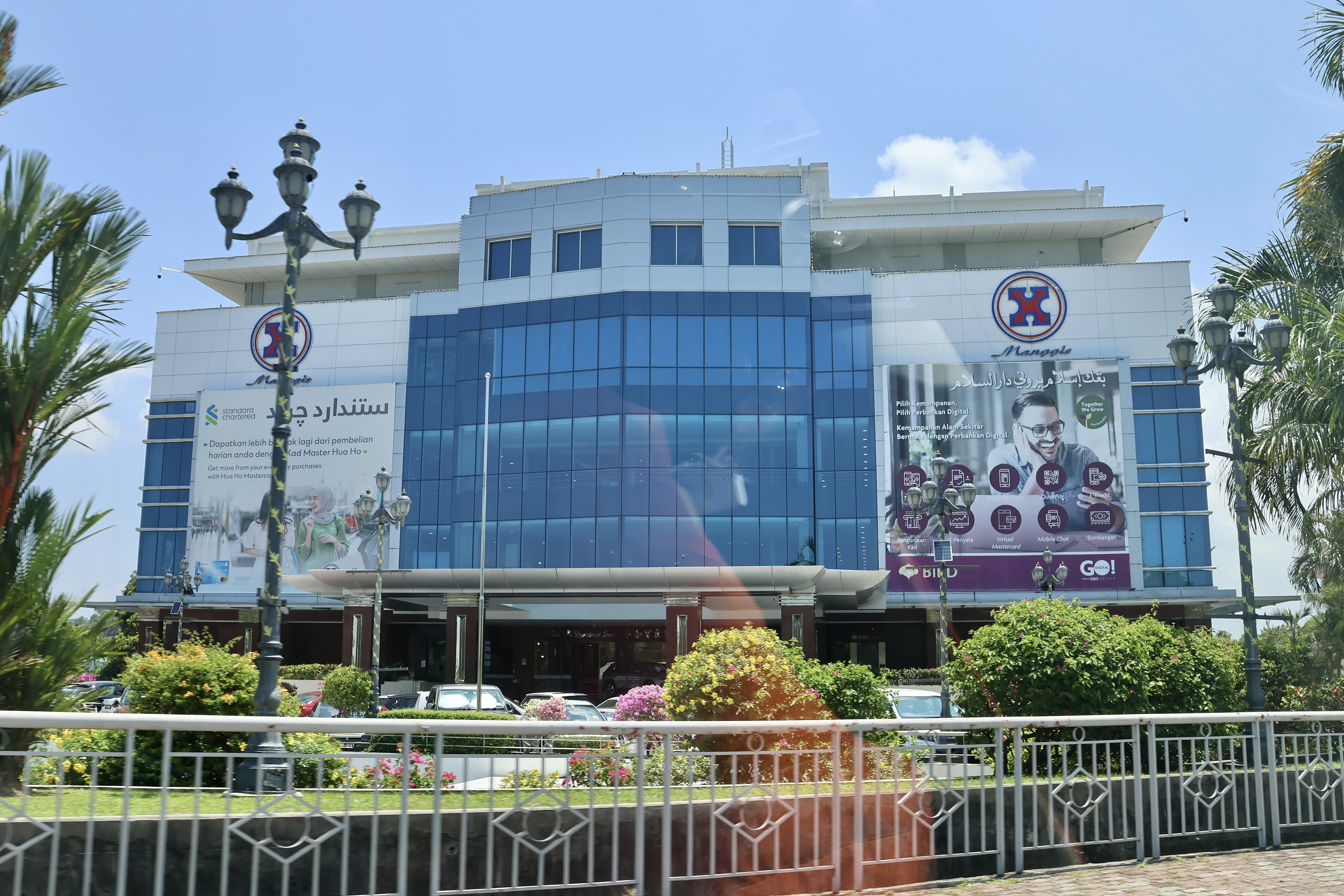
Hua Ho Department Store's Kampong Manggis branch in 2023

The ethnic Chinese were encouraged to settle in Brunei due to their commercial and business expertise. Despite their relatively small numbers, the Hokkien community has a significant presence in Brunei's private and business sectors, playing a key role in the country's commercial landscape and frequently collaborating with Malaysian Chinese enterprises in joint ventures. The non-state commercial sector in Brunei is largely dominated by ethnic Chinese who migrated during the British colonial period.

Both local Chinese and more recent immigrants from mainland China have contributed to the substantial growth of Chinese commerce in Brunei. With support from official organisations such as the CCC, local Chinese entrepreneurs make a considerable contribution to the national economy. These businesses promote the country's growth while maintaining strong ties with the Malay Chamber of Commerce. The presence of mainland Chinese also influences the economy, particularly through foreign direct investments such as Hengyi Industries' oil refinery. By adapting to Brunei's localisation process, which seeks to balance national identity with globalisation, local Chinese companies are essential to the diversification of the economy. Despite their marginalised status, the Chinese community holds significant economic power, with influential figures like Ong Kim Kee and Timothy Ong Teck Mong leading the private financial sector. This economic influence is seen as a potential challenge to Malay hegemony, prompting the state to implement measures designed to encourage Malay leadership within the private sector, although these efforts have yet to come to fruition.

Despite being governed by the land code and land code (strata), land purchase, ownership, and transfer in Brunei are complicated and opaque. Although citizens have the right to own and transfer land, the sultan-in-council and the Land Department have the last say over who can own property for foreigners and permanent residents. Land concerns are heavily influenced by cultural and national identity, especially when the monarchy's economic and cultural authority was solidified with the discovery of oil and gas. As a result, land ownership limitations and the promotion of national ideals were implemented. Since 1979, the sultan has had to approve all purchases or long-term leases, regardless of the buyer's background. Chinese nationals are also subject to unofficial restrictions, such as a two-hectare cap and the inability to register their purchases, even if they are authorised and paid for.

=== Political activities ===
A Kapitan Cina was a member of the State Council, the nation's executive branch, in 1921. George Newn Ah Foot also served on the State Council from 1955 to 1958 following World War II. Hong Kok Tin, who subsequently served as assistant minister of medicine and health from 1965 to 1970, was a member of the Executive Council when the 1959 constitution was introduced. The LegCo also had Chinese members such Yap Chung Teck, Chong Seng Toh, Hong Kok Tin, Othman @ Chua Kwang Soon, and George Newn Ah Foot. Regardless of the fact that one of the four police officers killed during the 1962 revolt was Chinese, the Chinese population in Brunei had no involvement in the rebellion. Prominent Chinese individuals have historically represented their community despite their political neutrality. For instance, Ong Boon Pang was appointed Kapitan Cina by the sultan in 1932, and later, Lim Cheng Choo played a key role in drafting Brunei's 1959 constitution and signed the 1979 Treaty of Friendship and Cooperation.

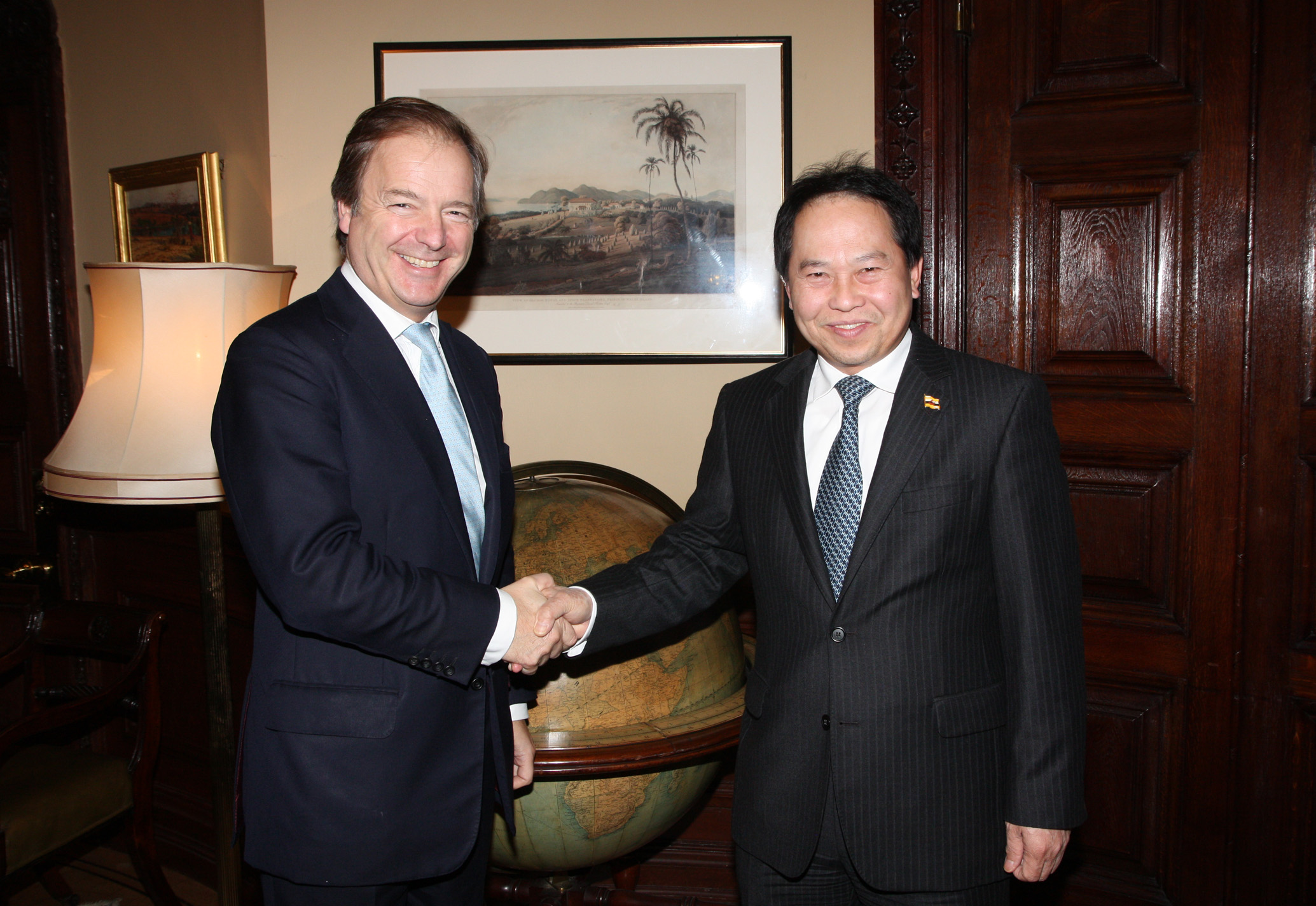
Hugo Swire greeting Aziyan Abdullah, Brunei high commissioner to the United Kingdom, in 2012

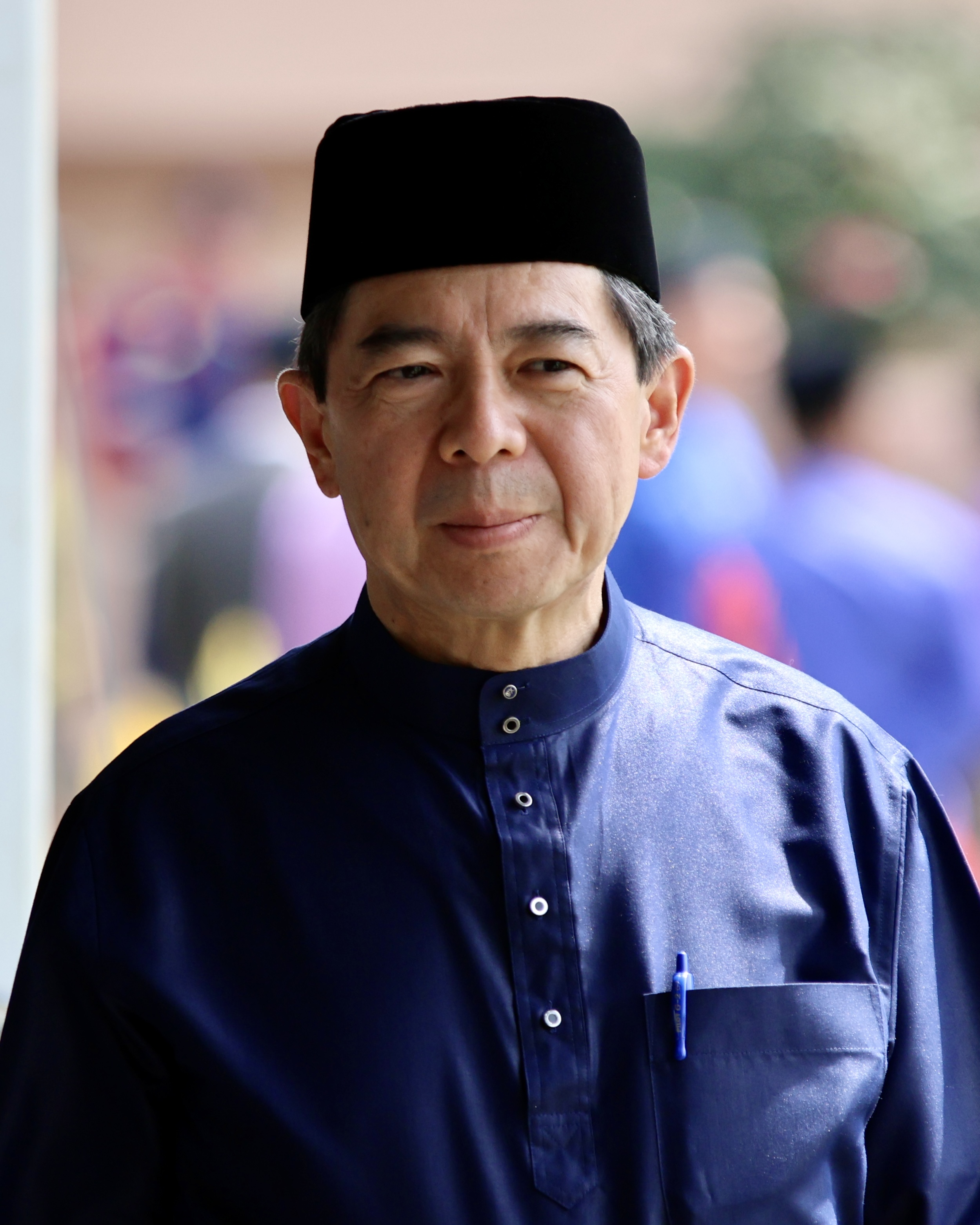
Amin Liew Abdullah, as the minister at the Prime Minister's Office and Finance and Economy II, in baju melayu in 2023

A number of Bruneian Chinese have achieved high-level government positions. Despite the financial difficulties after Prince Jefri Bolkiah's Amedeo Development Corporation collapsed, Amin Liew Abdullah, who joined the Brunei Investment Agency in 1997 and rose to the position of managing director in 2005, later held the position of permanent secretary in the Ministry of Industry and Primary Resources in 2008. Up until 2010, Timothy Ong, who comes from one of Brunei's oldest Chinese families, oversaw economic diversification as acting head of the Brunei Economic Development Board. Several other Bruneian Chinese have permanent secretarial positions, such as in the Ministries of Finance and Foreign Affairs, while Paul Kong serves as the General Assurance Association's acting chairman.

To symbolically highlight the value of the Chinese workforce, the Chinese elite is integrated into the Bruneian establishment through the adat istiadat, following a dual pattern. First, to incorporate the modern administrative elite into the hierarchical structure of traditional Bruneian society, commoners holding government offices are granted titles such as "Pehin" or "Dato". (Note: The Brunei government has strategically integrated prominent Chinese leaders into official roles, granting them traditional aristocratic titles," often in recognition of their loyalty to the sultan.) For example, Lim Jock Seng, the second Minister of Foreign Affairs since May 2005, has held the chairmanship of Brunei Shell Petroleum in 2008. Like other Pehins, Chinese Pehins swear an oath of allegiance to the sultan, reciting a chiri (mantra) that combines Arabic and Sanskrit, based on their rank. Additionally, Chinese community leaders, such as the chairmen of major associations, serve as registrars for Chinese marriages under the authority of local officials.

The royal family's involvement in Chinese New Year celebrations since 2006 and the appointment of traditional dignitaries to important community positions demonstrate Brunei's acceptance of the Chinese community as an essential component of its society. (Note: Along with funding Chinese-medium schools and temples, this is one of the ways the government recognizes the contributions of the Chinese minority through symbolic actions.) These include the Onn Siew Siong, based in Kuala Belait, and Lau Ah Kok and Goh King Chin, both of whom were formerly members of the LegCo and now reside in the Brunei–Muara District. Since Brunei normalised relations with Beijing in 1991, the Chinese community has continuously reaffirmed its support for the "one China" policy, despite the Qemoy Hokkien being the majority group. This shows allegiance to the sultan's authority.

Goh King Chin has represented the Chinese minority and addressed important problems pertaining to their welfare ever since the LegCo was resurrected in 2004 after a 20-year break. The first female deputy minister was Adina Othman @ Chua, an ethnic Chinese Muslim who worked at the Ministry of Culture, Youth, and Sports from 2010 to 2015. A member of the Chinese ethnic community, Steven Chong Wan Oon is a judge and judicial commissioner on the high court.

== Culture ==
=== Language ===
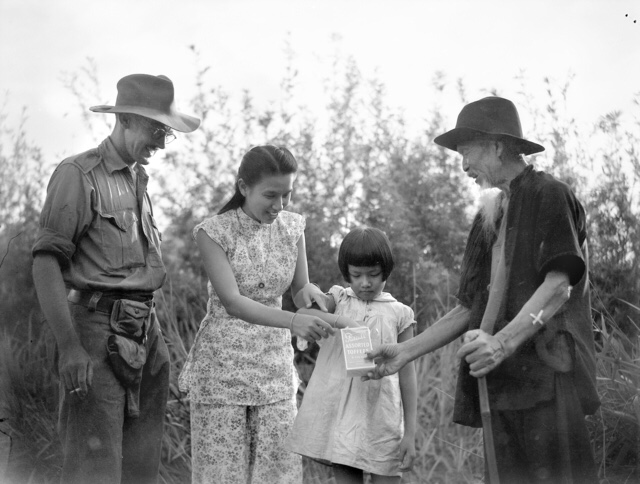
An Australian soldier seen with a Chinese mother and daughter, and an old man in 1945

The Chinese community in Brunei speaks several dialects, including Min Nan, Mandarin, Min Dong, Yue, Hakka, Cantonese, Hokkien, Foo Chow, and Teo Chew, with many also speaking English at home. However, the use of these dialects is declining, as younger generations are increasingly raised to speak English exclusively, and unofficial home schooling is the main way these dialects are preserved. Mandarin is taught in Chinese private schools alongside English and Malay, and its growing importance, particularly in business and economics, is reflected in the increasing number of Malay parents sending their children there. Nearly half of the Chinese population in Brunei are still temporary residents, and less than 25% are citizens. Brunei's government does not provide official Chinese language instruction, contributing to the decline of dialect use in formal settings.

=== Literature ===
The literary, intellectual, and cultural advancement of Brunei is influenced by the Chinese minority there. Although there has long been Chinese literature in Brunei, newer, English-educated generations have found resonance in the recent rise of Anglophone literature. Chinese Bruneian fiction, such as K. H. Lim's Written in Black, reflects the intricate cultural dynamics of the society by examining topics of identity, migration, and familial life. Furthermore, in the backdrop of migration and loss, plays like Tomorrow, the Sun Sets explore emotional bonds, especially those between mothers and daughters. Poetry has also been used to convey identity and culture. In addition to providing social commentary, these literary works capture the experiences of the Chinese population, such as the difficulties associated with mental health issues and statelessness. Chinese Bruneian literature has a small market, but it is essential to maintaining cultural legacy and promoting awareness of the distinctive experiences of the Chinese diaspora in Brunei.

=== Religion ===
Religion Bruneian Chinese
Religion	Percent
Buddhism & Taoism	65%
Christianity	20%
Islam	10%
Other religions (etc.)	5%

As of May 2020, approximately 65% of Chinese in Brunei identify as Buddhist, 20% as Taoist, 20% as Christian, and 10% as Muslim, with a smaller percentage. There are smaller numbers of practitioners of other religions, and Irreligious individuals among the Chinese community in Brunei numbering a combined 5%.

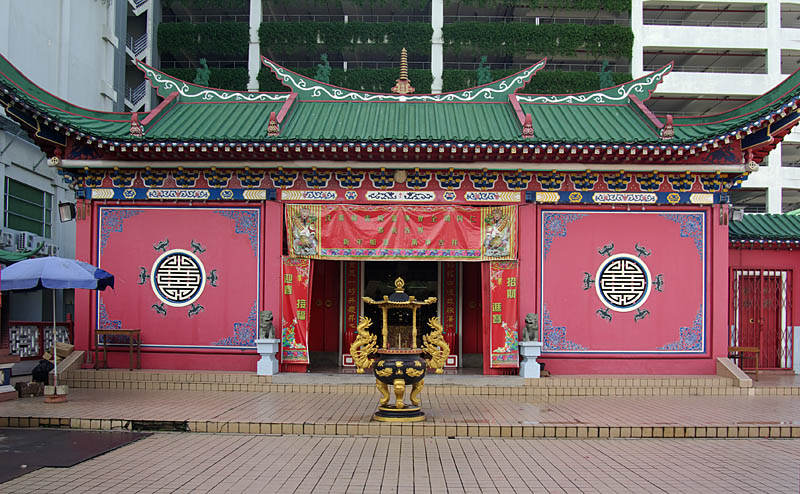
Teng Yun Temple, Bandar Seri Begawan in 2009

With Taoist temples spread across all four districts and Protestant and Catholic Christian churches in Bandar Seri Begawan, Seria, and Kuala Belait, the Chinese community in Brunei is granted religious freedom under the 1959 constitution. Cheok Boon Siok provided the funding for the first Chinese temple, the Teng Yun Temple, which was constructed in 1918 in Brunei Town and moved with government assistance in the 1950s. The temple continues to be a major site of worship where local Chinese congregate to honour their ancestors and commemorate Chinese holidays and customs, including the Chinese New Year. Cultural events such as lion dances are performed during these festivities, drawing in both the Chinese community and the general public, including visitors. These religious customs promote assimilation with Brunei's broader community while preserving Chinese cultural uniqueness. Furthermore, it is not unusual for Chinese Bruneians to convert to Islam, which reflects the religious variety of the country and the cultural assimilation taking place within the context of Brunei's MIB ideology.

The way the Chinese community views Malay-Chinese interactions and identity is significantly impacted when a Chinese person converts to Islam. It draws attention to the community's nuanced place in a culture that frequently marginalises Chinese men due to racialised preconceptions. Many Chinese people may view such a conversion as a rejection of their ethnic heritage and individualistic ideals when the convert sheds their prior selfish behaviours and takes on a new identity while embracing Islamic principles. The conversion is frequently seen as a step toward societal integration that is consistent with the Islamic concepts of responsibility and solidarity. The community's struggle with its position in a primarily Malay culture is also highlighted by this, as the individual's move from pursuing personal goals to concentrating on societal responsibility and unity may be interpreted as a reinforcement of the supremacy of Malay cultural and religious values. The Chinese community may have conflicting opinions about such conversions, acknowledging the person's assimilation into society while also addressing the more general issues of ethnic identity and how Chinese people are viewed inside the racially divided state.

=== Education ===
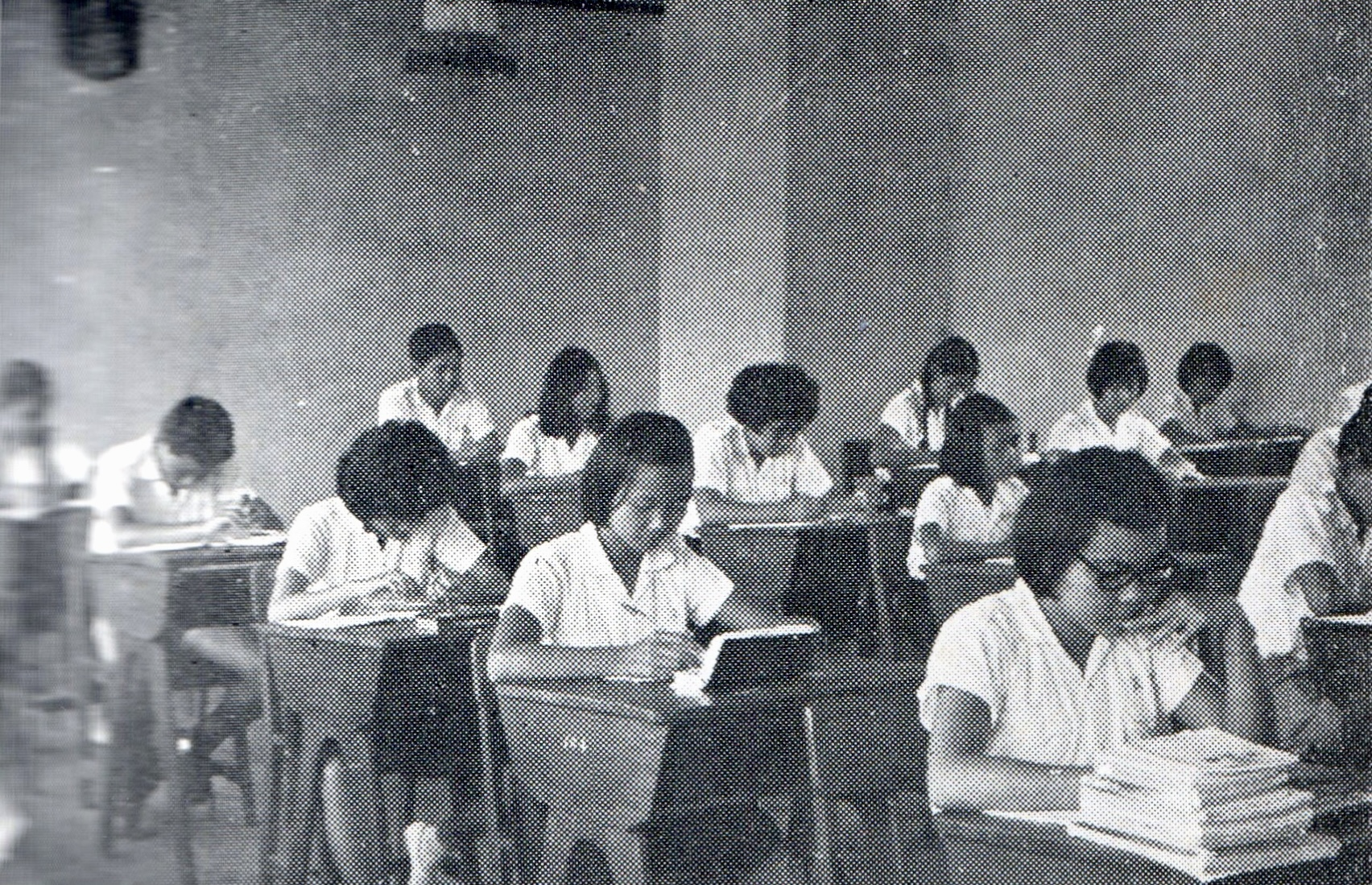
Chinese students in 1968 at Chung Ching Middle School, Seria

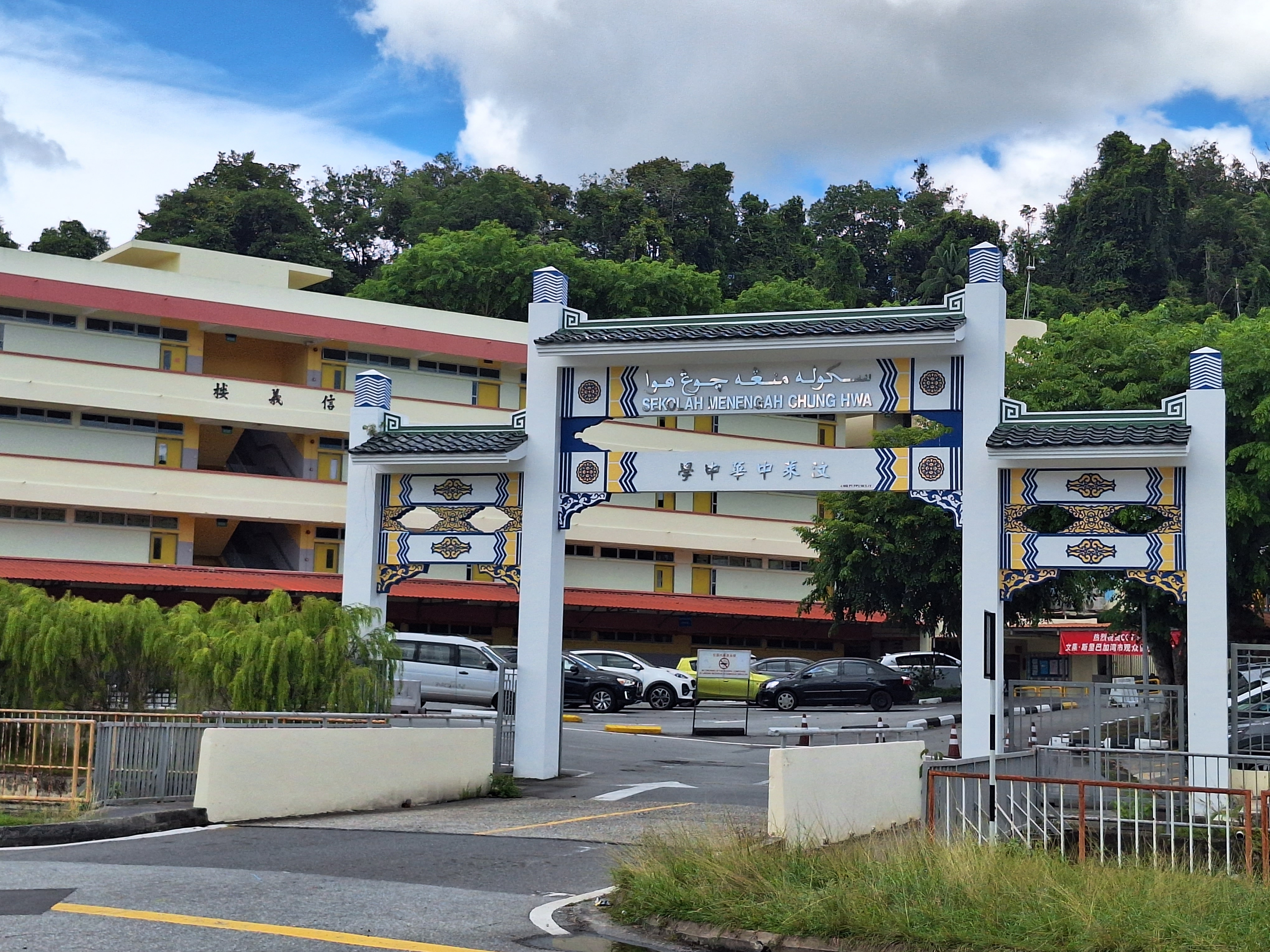
Chung Hwa Middle School, Bandar Seri Begawan in 2023

Chinese schools with solid academic reputations attract both Chinese and non-Chinese students, offering Mandarin as a third language alongside Malay and English. To preserve their cultural identity, the Chinese community has established Chinese-language schools, blending cultural education with academics, and Chinese cultural associations are key to maintaining and passing down their heritage. The Chinese community places great importance on education, reflecting their commitment to Brunei's cultural and national development.

As of 2020, Brunei has eight Chinese schools: three offer education from kindergarten to Form Five, while five provide primary schooling. The intermediate schools are located in Bandar Seri Begawan and Belait, while primary schools are spread across Tutong, Belait, and Temburong Districts. Over the past century, Chinese education has evolved from a system where Chinese was the primary medium of instruction to one where English is the main language, with Malay and Jawi as compulsory subjects. This shift has made learning Chinese more challenging, leading to a decline in language proficiency, exacerbated by a lack of government support and reduced use of Chinese in daily life.

Following the liberalisation of Brunei's education policy, private schools were allowed to offer Chinese language classes, though these are often basic due to limited resources and teaching methods. To promote intercommunity harmony, schools have introduced cultural activities such as lion dances, singing, and dancing. Even royal family members have started learning Chinese, signalling a move towards cultural integration. However, Chinese language education still faces challenges, including declining student interest and limited government support. Many community-funded Chinese schools struggle to remain open, and local Chinese associations are experiencing significant membership declines. Despite ongoing efforts, the future of Chinese education and culture in Brunei remains uncertain without greater support.

== Notable people ==
- Zeke Chan, Olympic swimmer
- Steven Chong Wan Oon, current Chief Justice of the Supreme Court.
- Queenie Chong, businessperson and member of the Legislative Council
- Goh Kiat Chun (Wu Chun), actor and singer.
- Goh King Chin, former member of the Legislative Council
- Hong Kok Tin, former member of the Legislative Council
- Maria Grace Koh, singer and former swimmer
- Lau Ah Kok, aristocrat and founder of Hua Ho
- Lau How Teck, businessman and member of the Legislative Council
- Amin Liew Abdullah (formerly Liew Kong Ming), Minister of Finance and Economy II and Minister at the Prime Minister's Office.
- Liew Chuan Fue, former footballer, 1999 Malaysia Cup winner
- Mary Lim, businesswoman and educator
- Lim Jock Hoi, former Secretary-General of ASEAN
- Lim Jock Seng, former Minister of Foreign Affairs and Trade II and Minister at the Prime Minister's Office
- Lim Teck Hoo, aristocrat and businessperson
- Lim Cheng Choo, aristocrat and politician
- Ong Boon Pang, aristocrat
- Ong Kim Kee, businessman
- Ong Sum Ping, aristocrat and folklore figure
- Ong Tiong Oh, member of the Legislative Council
- Onn Siew Siong, aristocrat
- Andrew Shie, first Bruneian elevated as assistant bishop in the Diocese of Kuching.
- Cornelius Sim, first Roman Catholic Vicar Apostolic of Brunei and first Cardinal of Brunei and Borneo.
- Tan Bee Yong, civil servant and diplomat
- Magdalene Teo, diplomat
- Nik Hafimi, businesswoman and member of the Legislative Council
- Tong Kit Siong, karate practitioner
- Hosea Wong, martial artist
- Hayley Wong, Olympic swimmer
- Faustina Woo Wai Sii, wushu practitioner
- Joshua Yong, Olympic swimmer
- Aziyan Abdullah (formerly Yong Foo), diplomat
- Roderick Yong Yin Fatt, former Secretary-General of ASEAN
- Jaspar Yu Woon Chai, Olympic badminton player
- Frankie Chan, Radio Televisyen Brunei personality
- Allen Lai, Radio Televisyen Brunei former news anchor

== See also ==
- Malaysian Chinese
- Singaporean Chinese
- Indonesian Chinese
- Filipino Chinese
- Thai Chinese
- Vietnamese Chinese
- Cambodian Chinese
- Laotian Chinese
- East Timorese Chinese
- Burmese Chinese
- Chinese folk religion in Southeast Asia
- Brunei–China relations
