= Chung Ching Middle School, Seria =

Private school in Belait District, Brunei

Chung Ching Middle School
- 中正中学
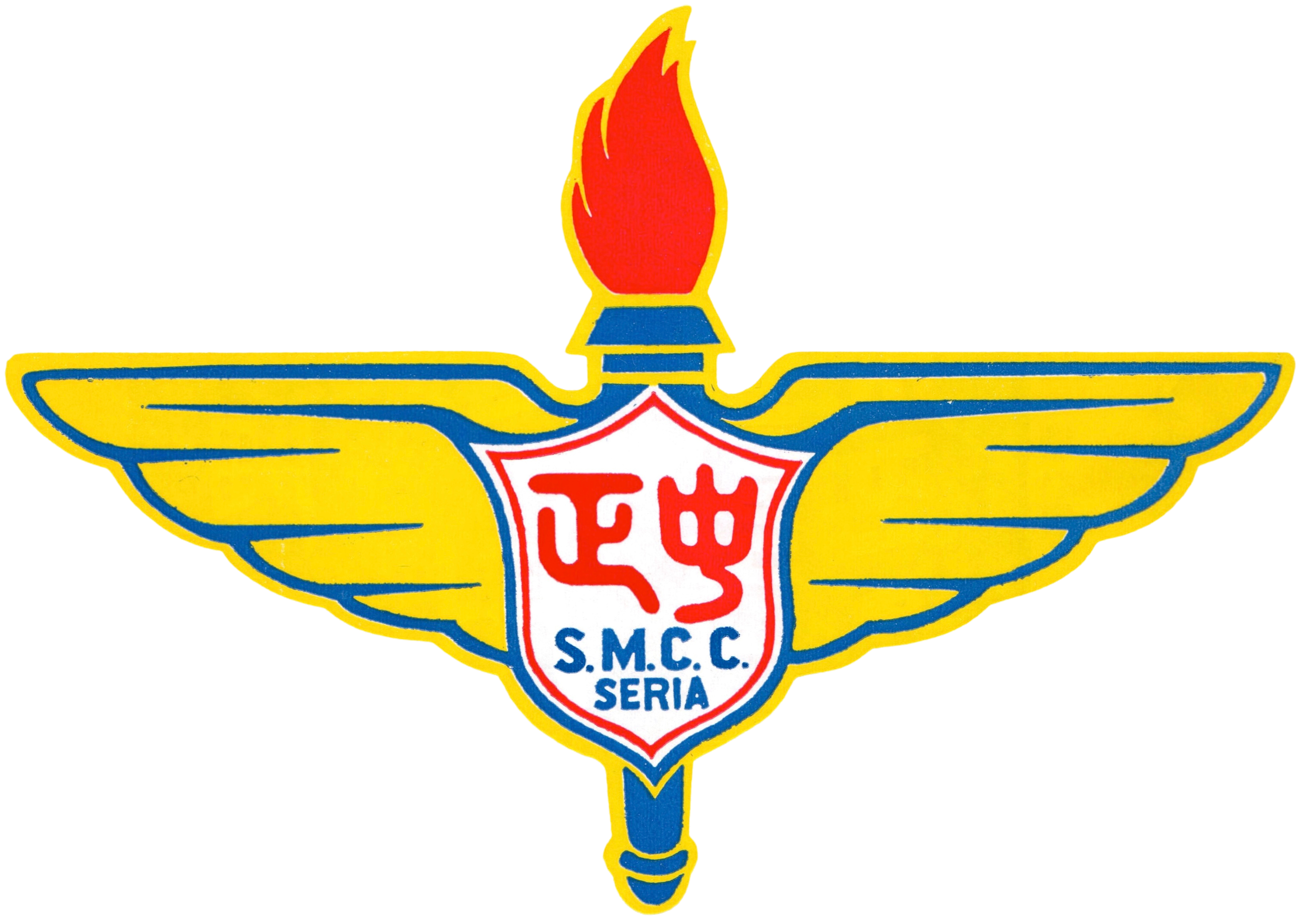

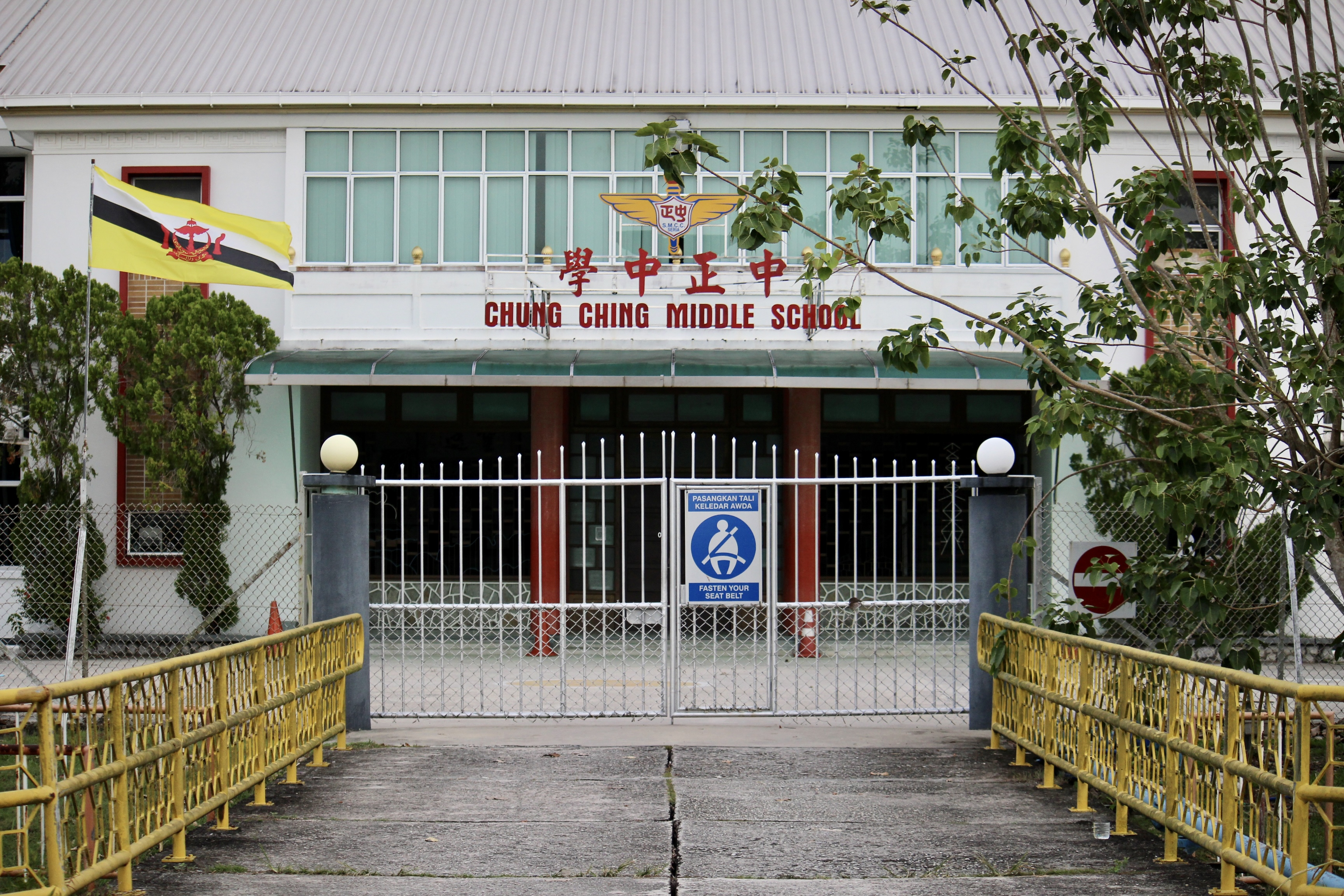
- The secondary school in 2022

Location
- Jalan Bolkiah; Seria, Belait District, KB4333; Brunei
- Coordinates: 4°36′32.58″N 114°20′7.20″E

Information
- Former name: Chinese Oversea Seria Public Chung Ching School (1939–1954)
- Type: Private
- Motto: 诚, 公, 爱, 敬 (Honesty, Justice, Love, Respect)
- Founded: 1937; 89 years ago
- Chairman: Chin Kim Min
- Principal: Kah Jin Yau
- Gender: Coeducational
- Houses: 4
- Affiliations: CIE
- Website: chungching.org

Chinese name
- Simplified Chinese: 中正中学
- Traditional Chinese: 中正中學
Transcriptions
Standard Mandarin
- Hanyu Pinyin: Zhōngzhèng Zhòngxué
Southern Min
- Hokkien POJ: Tiong-chèng Tiong-ha̍k

Chung Ching Middle School, Seria (CCMS; Chinese: 诗里亚中正中学; Malay: Sekolah Menengah Chung Ching, Seria) is a private school located in Seria, within the Belait District of Brunei. Established in 1937, it is one of five Chinese primary schools and three secondary schools in the country. The school is primarily funded by the local Chinese community, particularly through Chinese associations, while its curriculum, staffing, and instructional hours are regulated by the relevant government authorities. The campus is divided into two sections: one for the primary level and the other for secondary and kindergarten levels, situated in close proximity to one another.

== History ==
=== Founding years (1937–1953) ===
In 1937, efforts were initiated to raise funds for the establishment of a school in response to the growing number of overseas Chinese children and the needs of the local community. Over ¥3,000 was raised by 19 founding members, (Note: Founding members were Yang Zhishan, Zhong Baqing, Wang Quan, He Dunhuan, Guo Yun, Zhang Shaobo, Wang Han, Lin Gen, He Shuiyuan, Lin Guang, Chen Lun, Liang Zhi, Liang Su, Chen Xian, Xu Dashan, Luo Guangxian, Liang Zhen, Yu Tang and Zhong Keqianzhu.) which allowed for the construction of a school building on a site at the west end of Seria. By 1938, the primary section of the school was completed, featuring wooden walls, atap roofs, and consisting of three classrooms, a conference room, and a teacher's quarter. The school officially opened with 27 students, one primary class, a headmaster, and a teacher. In July of the same year, the school was finished, and the first school board was established, comprising the original founders, as well as Chuan Guomiao and Chen Baoqun. Yang Zhishan was elected as chairman, and Chen Zhemin was appointed principal. The school was renamed the Chinese Oversea Seria Public Chung Ching School, and its curriculum was revised to follow the Chinese primary school syllabus and textbooks, with the addition of English as a subject.

In 1939, an additional class was introduced, raising the student body to over 50, and a new teacher was hired. By 1941, the student population had surpassed 100. However, the outbreak of World War II led to the Japanese invasion, causing the school to close and its buildings to be destroyed. After the war, in 1945, the school board was reinstated, and ¥3,000 was raised to rebuild the school, with local donations of artificial wood. By the spring of 1946, reconstruction was completed, and Liu Bihui was hired as principal to oversee the reopening in July, enrolling approximately 100 students across three classes. Between 1947 and 1949, three different individuals served as principal for one-year terms.

As the school expanded, more classes and teachers were added to accommodate the growing student population. On 15 June 1949, nine students from the first primary class graduated, and the school expanded to include two additional classrooms and an office. A kindergarten class was also introduced, bringing the total to five classes with over 400 students. In 1952, the booming oil industry led to an influx of Chinese workers and businessmen in the town, resulting in overcrowding at the school. To address this, the school board launched a third fundraising campaign, raising more than ¥70,000 for new construction, with contributions from the oil field company and individual donors such as Liu Qin. In 1953, construction began on a new primary school building on a 1 acre (0.40 ha) plot provided by the Brunei government in the southeast corner of Seria. The building, which included 23 classrooms, an auditorium, dining room, and kitchen, was completed by the end of the year and became the school's primary location. This new facility allowed the school to further expand its curriculum and accommodate its growing student body.

=== Primary to middle school (1953–1969) ===
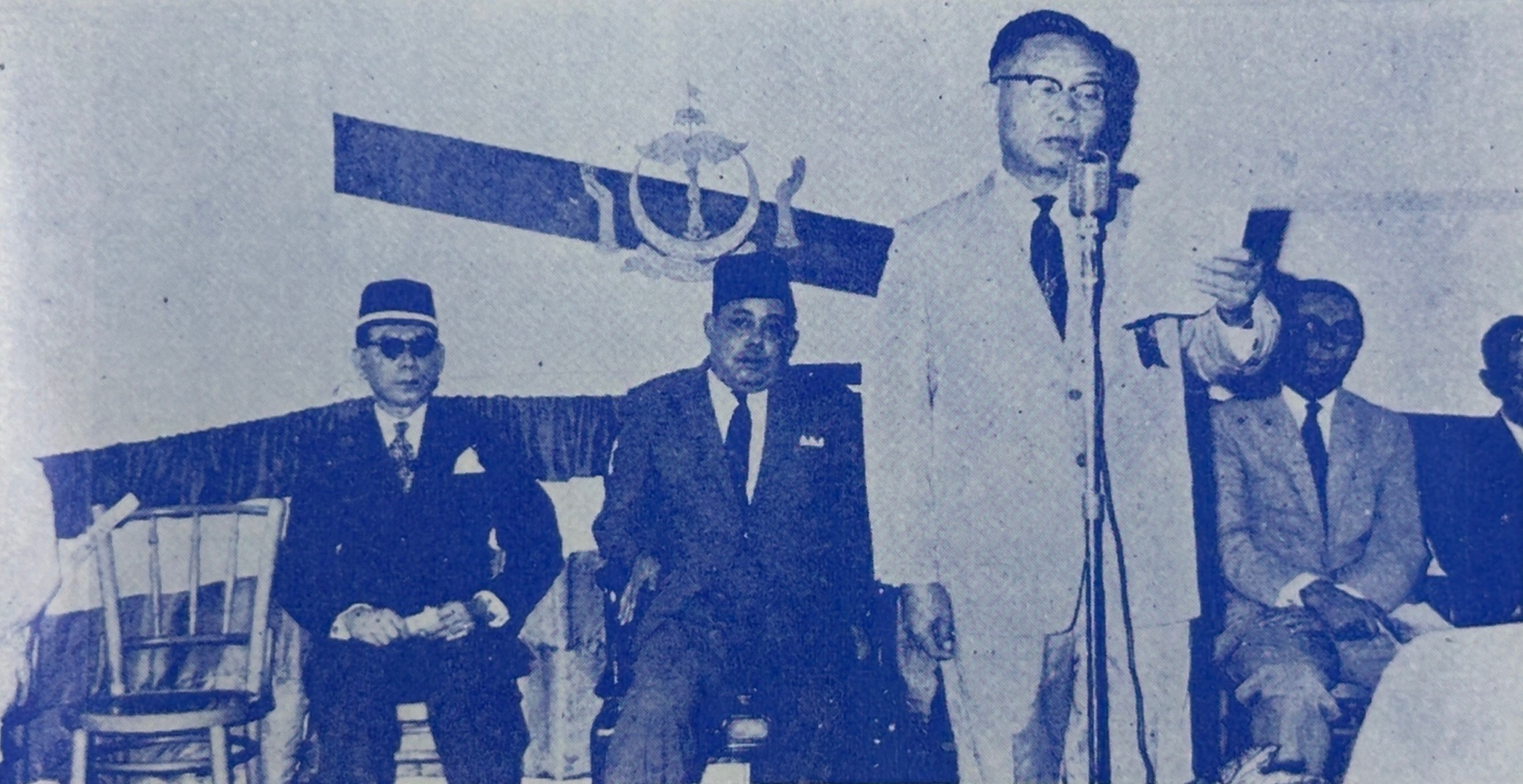
Ibrahim Mohammad Jahfar and Pengiran Anak Mohamed Alam (first and second from the left) at the opening ceremony of the new school building on 4 September 1960

In 1953, due to overcrowding, the school began expanding its facilities and was renamed Chung Ching Middle School after lower secondary sections were added in 1954. Five additional classrooms were constructed on the east and west sides of the original building, with government approval for a ¥10,000 subsidy towards construction costs. As the student population continued to rise, the school began planning for a new middle school building. In 1958, a design committee was formed to create plans for the new structure, which would be built on a 0.25 acres (0.10 ha) plot allocated by the government. The architectural plans were approved in May 1959, and construction began shortly after, funded through a combination of government subsidies and a fundraising campaign that raised ¥58,000. The new school building was completed in 1960, and a grand inauguration ceremony was held on 4 September, where Pengiran Anak Mohamed Alam, standing in for Sultan Omar Ali Saifuddien III, announced the opening of the secondary school building. The new structure cost nearly B$400,000, and alongside it, a faculty dormitory was built to accommodate middle school teachers on campus. By 1960, the school had more than 1,500 students, and by 1968, with more than 1,820 pupils, it had become the largest school in the country.

In 1964, the school constructed a large teahouse at the left corner of the playground at a cost of over ¥24,000. This building served as both an indoor sports facility and a temporary assembly hall. That same year, a winding corridor was added to connect the teacher dormitory and classroom buildings, and a new steel-reinforced cement bridge was built at the school gate. As the student population continued to rise, the original classrooms were no longer sufficient to accommodate the increase in students. In 1965, the board of directors organised a construction committee, which decided to demolish the front row of wooden classrooms and offices. A new steel-concrete school building was completed in May 1966 at a cost of ¥105,000, with ¥50,000 subsidised by the government and the remainder donated by overseas Chinese. Plans were also made to gradually improve the old classrooms and kindergarten areas.

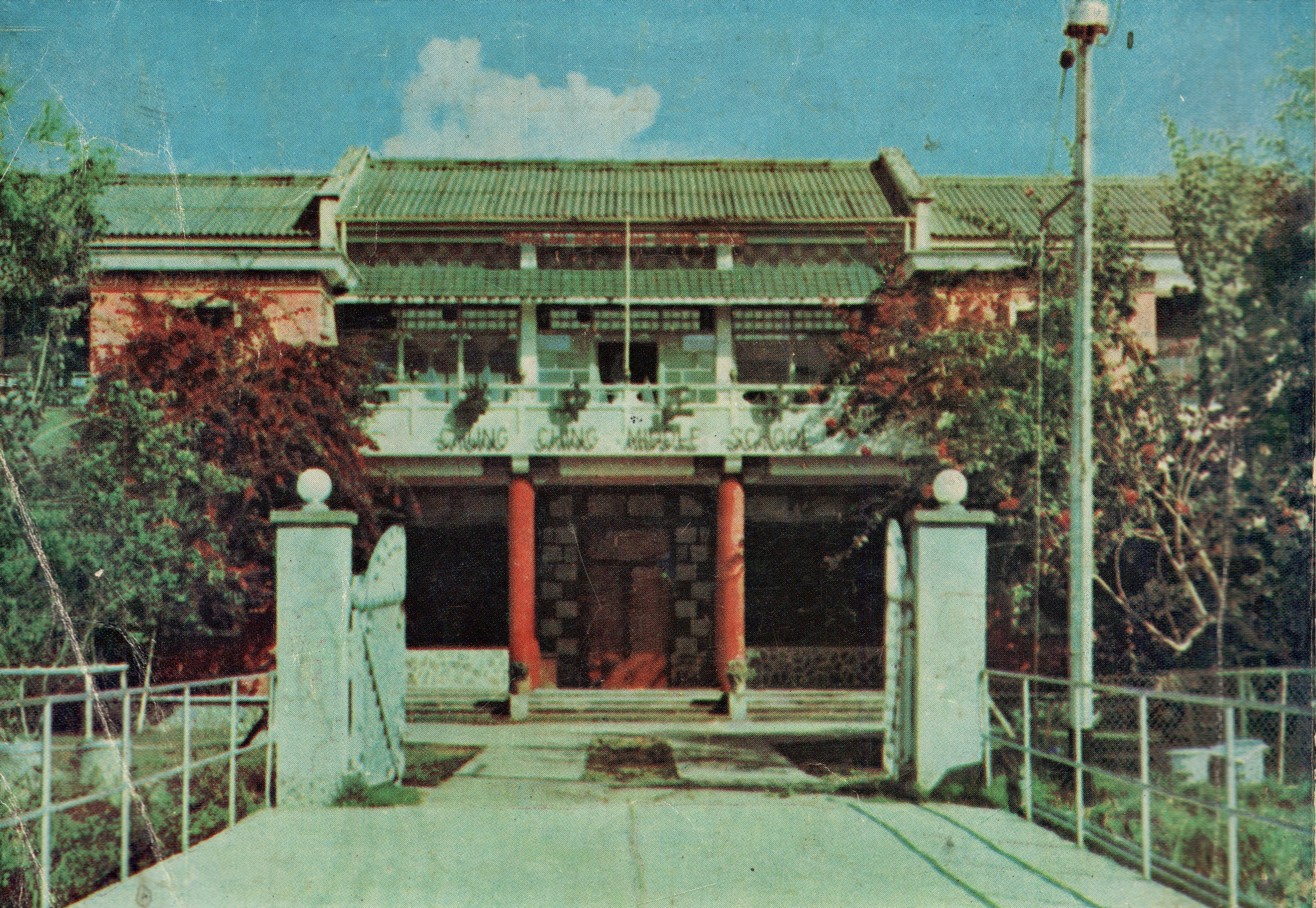
The secondary school in 1968

In 1967, the school renovated the faculty dormitories into modern buildings, providing accommodation for eight families. The construction cost exceeded ¥43,900 and was completed by May of that year. In 1969, a new auditorium was built at a cost of ¥152,963. The auditorium, which could hold 800 to 1,000 students, also featured a dental clinic for schoolchildren and space for sports activities. To make room for the auditorium, the sports ground was reduced in size, prompting the school to petition the government for three additional acres of land to accommodate new facilities, including basketball and football courts.

=== Royal visits and beyond (1986–present) ===
A significant milestone in the history of the school occurred on 2 December 1986, when Sultan Hassanal Bolkiah made his first visit. He returned for a surprise second visit on 11 August 2003, and was later present at the school's gallery show in 2009, held at the International Convention Centre during Chinese New Year festivities. The sultan made a third visit to the school in 2012.

In more recent years, the school marked another important development with the signing of an agreement for the construction of a staff dormitory on 18 February 2021, followed by a groundbreaking ceremony on 3 June. The project received strong community support, including a ¥30,000 donation from Ong Tiong Oh. On 27 August 2022, the dormitory was officially inaugurated by the Chinese Ambassador to Brunei, Yu Hong.

== Notable alumni ==
- Mary Lim (born 1948), a businesswoman and educator

== Gallery ==
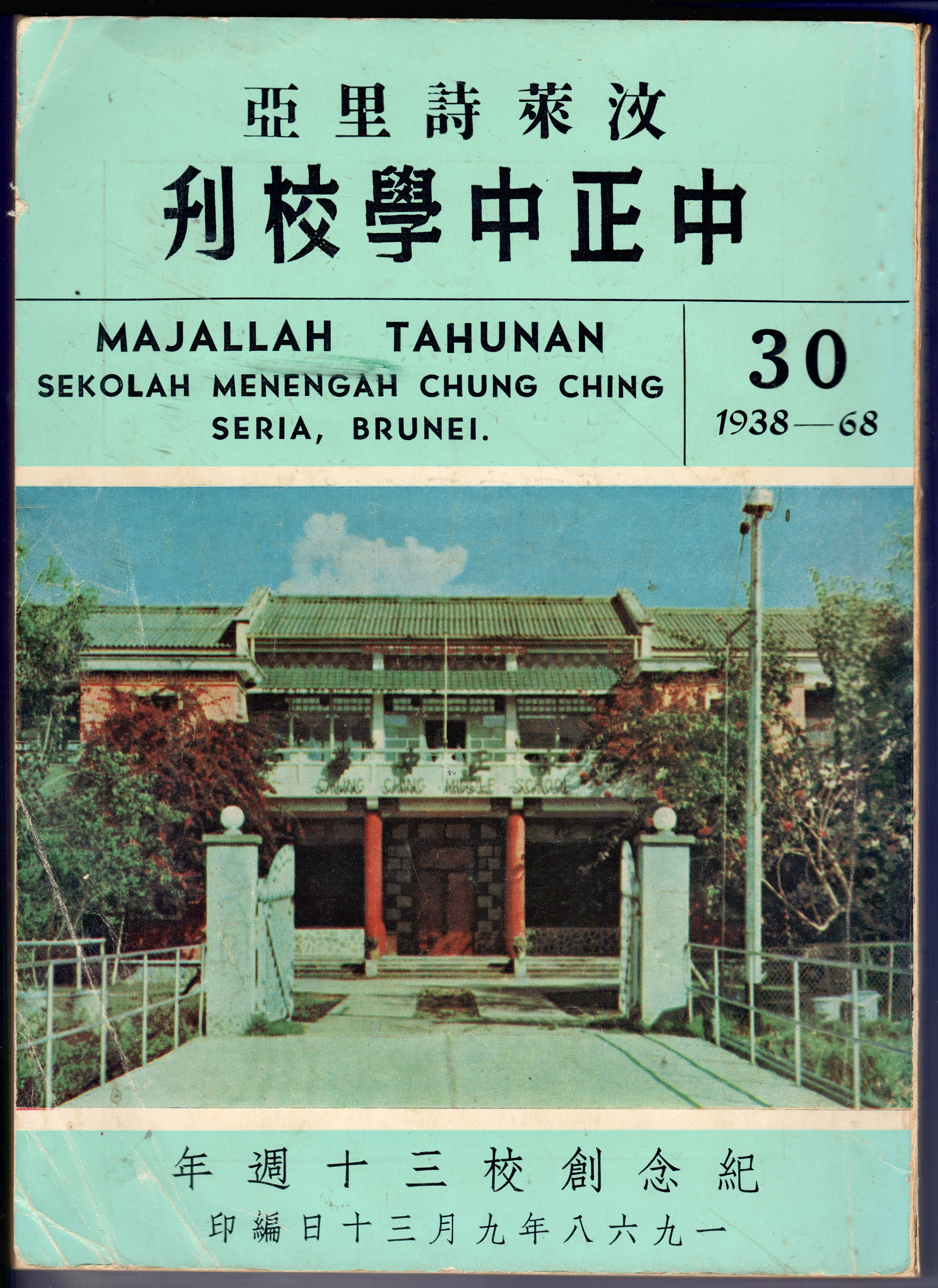
1968 school magazine

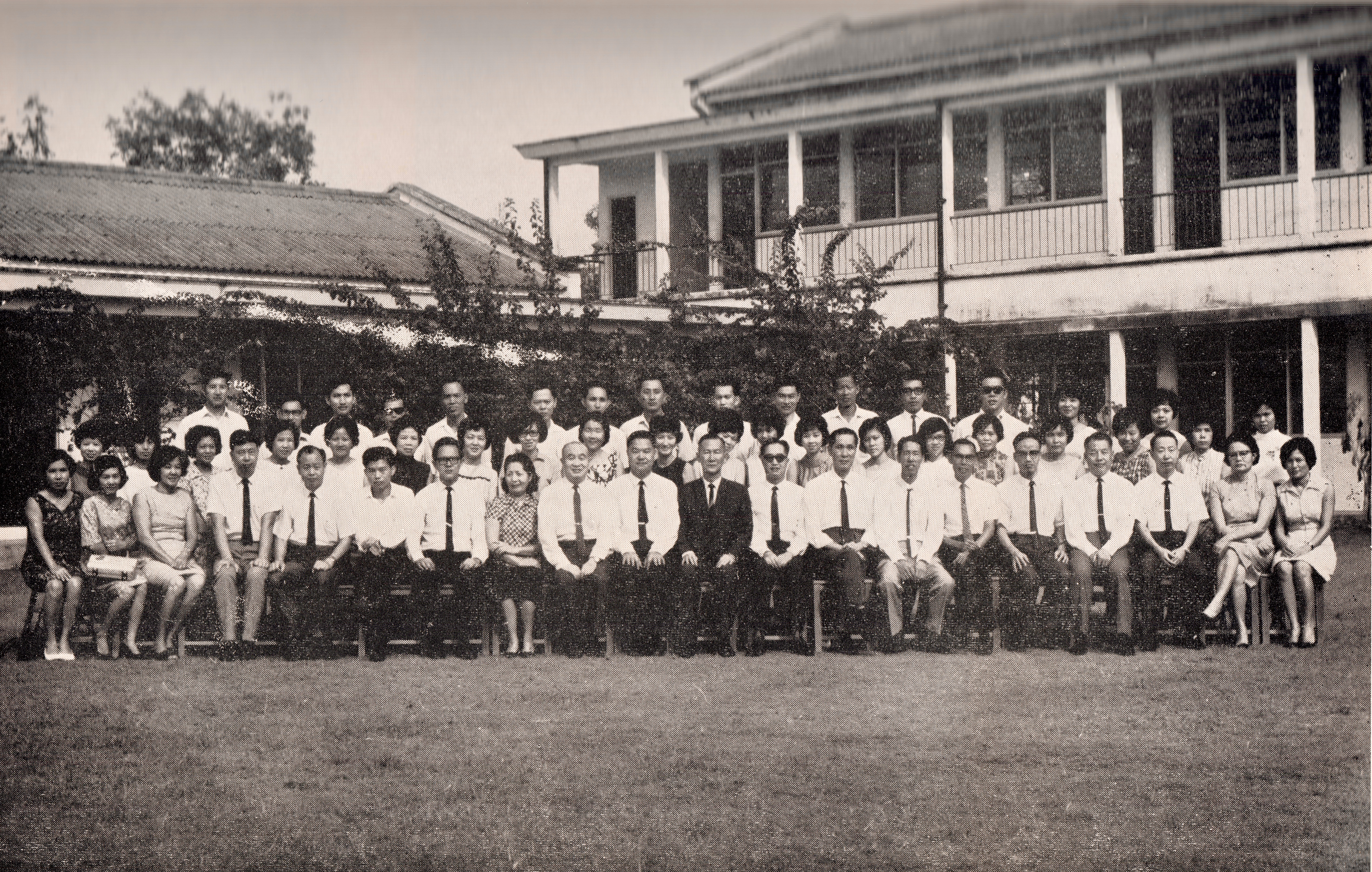
Principal and the board members in 1968

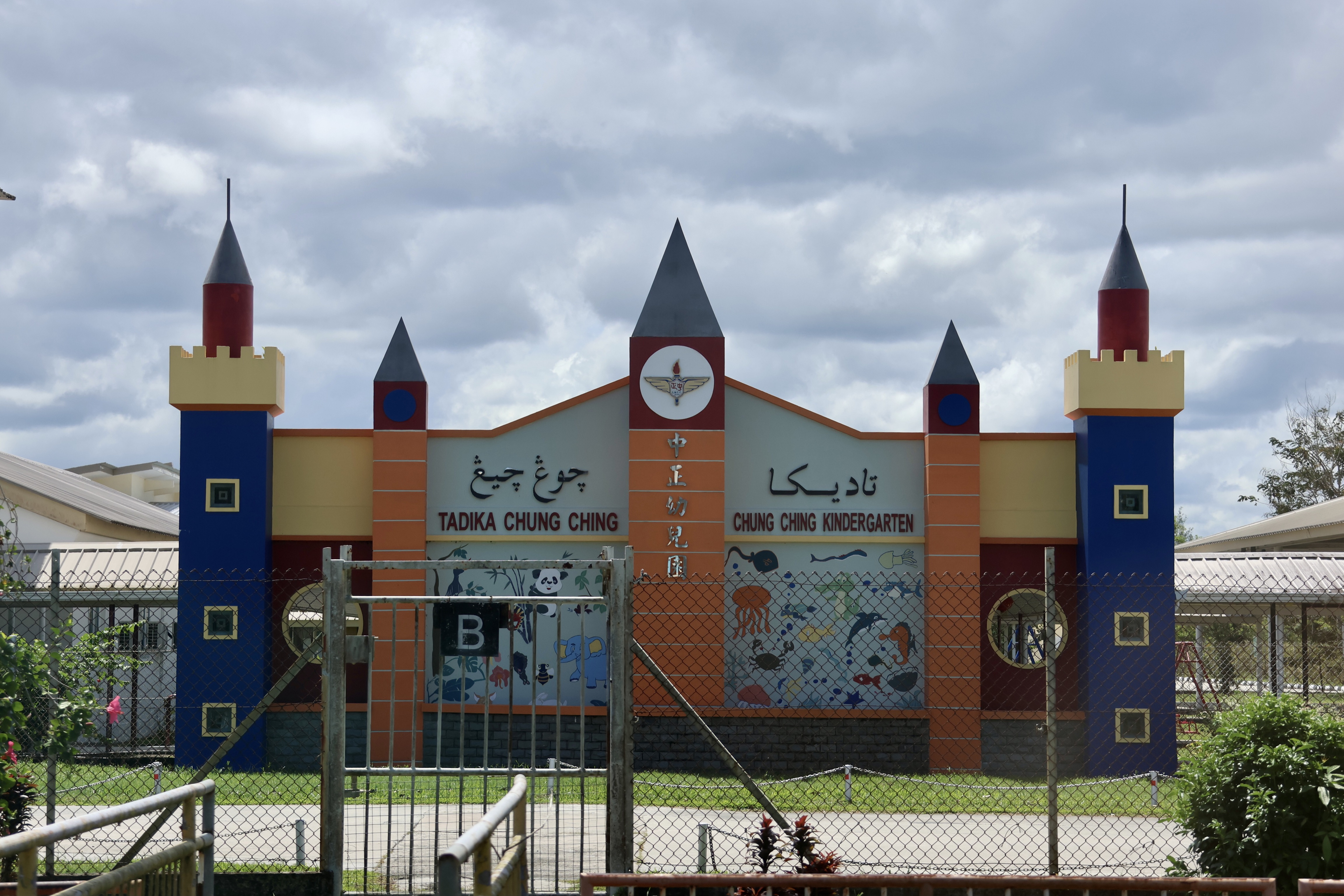
The kindergarten section in 2023

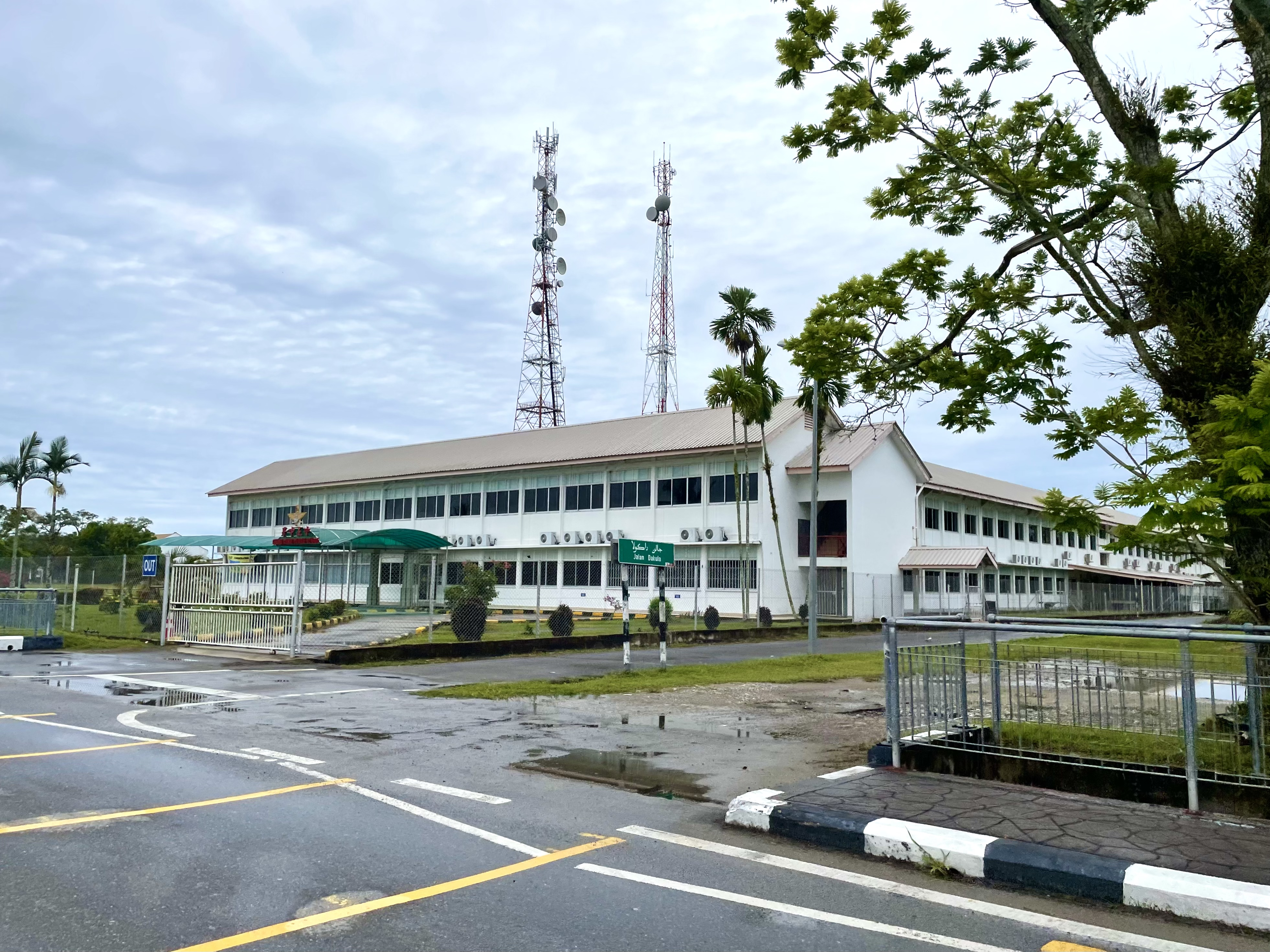
The primary school in 2021

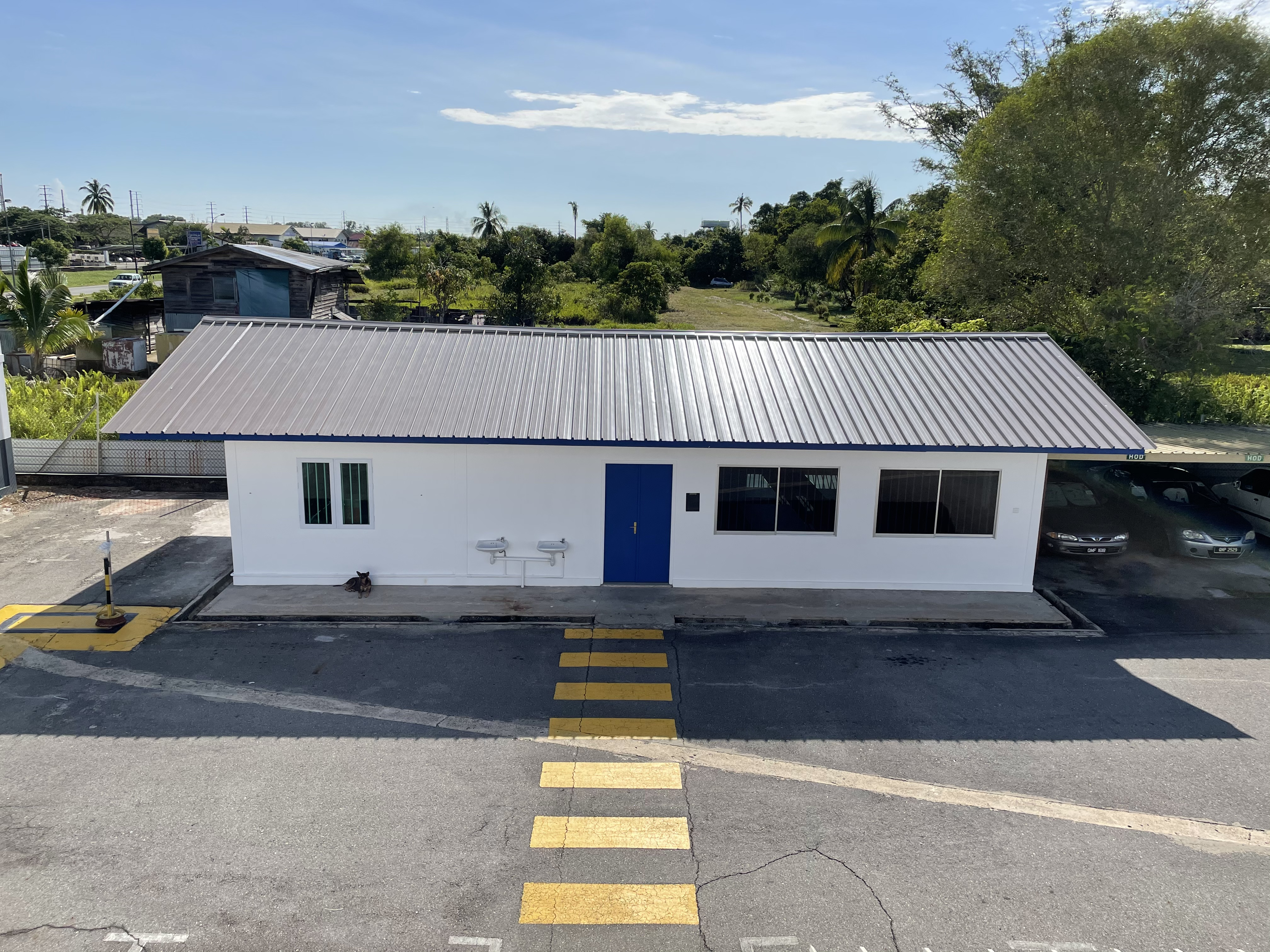
The secondary school's canteen in 2021

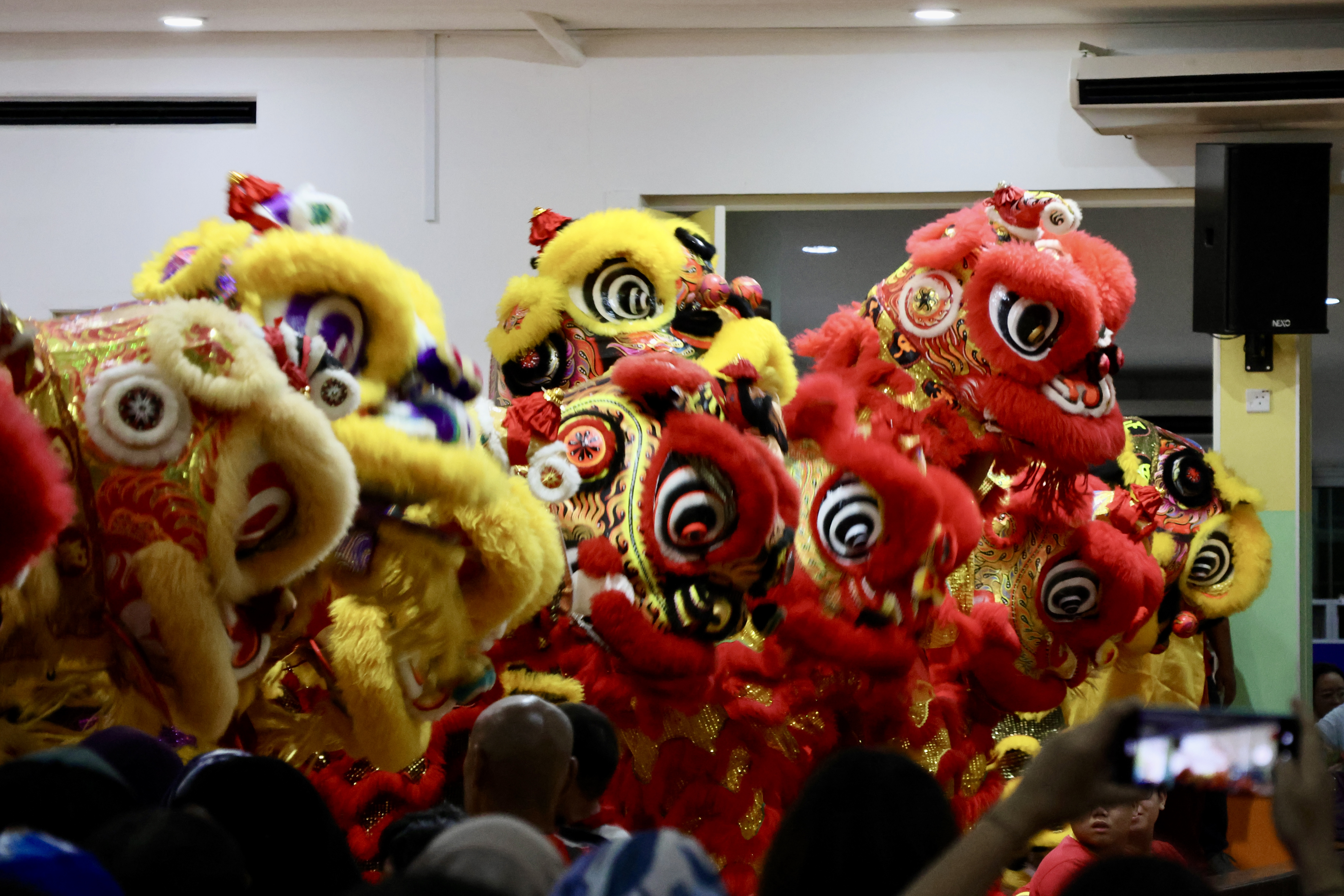
Lion dance at the secondary school in 2024

== See also ==
- List of schools in Brunei
