= Onn Siew Siong =

Bruneian entrepreneur and philanthropist (born 1938)

Yang Dimuliakan Pehin Bendahari China Dato Paduka Onn Siew Siong DPMB SNB PJK
- 温瑞祥
- Born: 1938 (age 87–88); Brunei
- Education: Chung Hwa School, Tutong
- Occupations: Entrepreneur; philanthropist; community leader
- Spouse: Lien Hni Si
- Children: 6
- Honours: See here

Chinese name
- Simplified Chinese: 温瑞祥
- Traditional Chinese: 溫瑞祥
Transcriptions
Standard Mandarin
- Hanyu Pinyin: Wēn Ruìxiáng
Southern Min
- Hokkien POJ: Un Sūi-siông

Onn Siew Siong (Chinese: 温瑞祥; pinyin: Wēn Ruìxiáng; Pe̍h-ōe-jī: Un Sūi-siông; born 1938) was a Bruneian aristocrat, entrepreneur and community leader in both the business and educational sectors of Brunei. His commitment to philanthropy and collaboration with the government significantly shaped the community throughout his life. In 1997, he transitioned from the construction industry to focus more on serving his country and its people, all while maintaining his leadership roles, including chairman of the Belait Chinese Chamber of Commerce and Chung Hua School, Tutong, and holding directorships in several companies.

== Early life and education ==
Born in 1938, Onn began his education at Chung Hua School in Tutong, Brunei, where he completed his elementary schooling in five years. He subsequently chose to suspend his studies to assist his father in managing the family business during a financial crisis, dedicating over 20 years to this endeavour. Although his formal education concluded at the elementary level, his extensive experience in operating the family business provided him with invaluable insights and expertise. This practical involvement not only honed his leadership skills but also contributed significantly to his profound understanding of local commerce and community engagement.

== Career ==
In 1972, Onn joined the Belait Chinese Chamber of Commerce as a public relations secretary. His tireless efforts and the high regard in which he was held by his fellow members culminated in his election as chairman of the chamber in 1987, a position he has maintained to this day. Reflecting on his role, Onn articulated, "The Chinese Chamber of Commerce is geared towards increasing the country's economy," thereby underscoring the chamber's commitment to fostering robust relations between the Chinese community and the government. He further emphasised the CCC's ongoing support and active collaboration in national festivities, highlighting its dedication to promoting community engagement and contributing to economic development.

Onn has been involved in societal contributions and education since 1962, notably serving as a member of the Sultan's birthday celebration committee for many years. In 1987, he was appointed as a counsellor of the Seria Council by the Sultan, a position he continues to hold. He received the Manteri title in 1996 for his dedicated service and was honoured with six awards from the Sultan between 1982 and 2004. Additionally, he has served as vice-president of the Chinese Charitable Association in Tutong and as chairman of the Amateur Basketball Association in Tutong. In the realm of education, Onn became chairman of Chung Hua School, Tutong in 1983 and held this role until 2008, serving twenty-two consecutive terms, and was also a member of the Examination Information Committee in Seria from 1963 for nine years.

Onn was appointed by the Sultan as the Chinese marriage registrar for the Tutong and Belait Districts, a role he held for over 15 years to assist the government in overseeing the traditions surrounding Chinese marriages. Despite lacking formal higher education credentials, he successfully fostered relationships with both the local Malay and Chinese populations, earning significant support from the Bruneian Malay community due to his fluency in Malay and deep understanding of their culture. As of 2009, Onn serves as the advisor to the Tutong District's Tiong Hwa Association and participated in the Department of Information's national briefing on 11 November, led by Hadi Melayong, which focused on "Negara Kesultanan Melayu Islam" and aimed to enhance knowledge and provide citizens and residents, regardless of their faith or ethnicity, with the latest information regarding the country's issues and administration. Additionally, Onn holds the position of honorary advisor to Chung Hwa Middle School in Bandar Seri Begawan. He presented a B$1,000 contribution cheque for the charity fund on 12 August 2014, as part of the Hari Raya Aidilfitri festivities in Kuala Belait.

== Other works ==
Onn has played a significant role in fostering diplomatic relations between Brunei and China through various initiatives. During their farewell meeting with Chinese ambassador Tong Xiaoling in 2010, he and other leaders of the Brunei Chinese community expressed their gratitude for the embassy's efforts to strengthen ties with their ancestral homeland and reaffirmed their commitment to promoting Chinese culture and education in Brunei. They also received appreciation for their contributions to Brunei's development and support for friendly cooperation between China and Brunei. In a subsequent meeting in 2015, Chinese ambassador to Brunei Yang Jian acknowledged their efforts to foster friendship between the two countries and expressed gratitude for their role in advancing Brunei-China relations. In 2023, he welcomed Representative Huang Qingxiong and his delegation to discuss Chinese language education, visa opportunities to Taiwan, business prospects between Taiwan and Brunei, and direct flights, exchanging souvenirs and inviting them for a banquet. Additionally, during a visit that same year, Chinese ambassador Xiao Jianguo commended him for his contributions to supporting Chinese education, building friendship between China and Brunei, and serving the Chinese community.

== Personal life ==
Onn resides in Kuala Belait and is married to Lien Hni Si. Together, they have six children, comprising two daughters and four sons, all of whom have attained advanced degrees and established successful careers, reflecting his commitment to education and excellence in their professional pursuits. On 22 October 2010, following a tea ceremony at Onn's home to honor the elderly, Princess Masna and Pengiran Anak Abdul Aziz attended the wedding ceremony of On Hung Ghee, their son, held at the Ballroom of Hua Ho Manggis Mall.

Onn's name and the names of other Chinese attendees at a celebration event are not revealed in the Malay-language articles in Media Permata. Concerns over the perceived importance of Chinese community members in Malay-language media are brought up by this omission. The articles imply that he and other people's mentions may be seen as less significant in this particular context.

== Titles, styles and honours ==
=== Titles and styles ===
In May 1996, Sultan Hassanal Bolkiah conferred the Manteri title of Pehin Bendahari China upon Onn, who is honoured with the honorific Yang Dimuliakan. This title was awarded in recognition of his dedicated humanitarian activities and significant contributions to the field of education, reflecting the Sultan's appreciation for his efforts to enhance community welfare and promote educational advancement in Brunei.

=== Honours ===
In recognition of his dedicated service to the country, Onn has received several state honours from the Sultan, including:

- Order of Seri Paduka Mahkota Brunei Second Class (DPMB) – Dato Paduka
- Order of Seri Paduka Mahkota Brunei Third Class (SMB)
- Order of Setia Negara Brunei Third Class (SNB)
- Order of Setia Negara Brunei Fourth Class (PSB)
- Meritorious Service Medal (PJK)
