= Lau How Teck =

Bruneian businessperson and politician

Yang Berhormat Lau How Teck
- 刘孝德
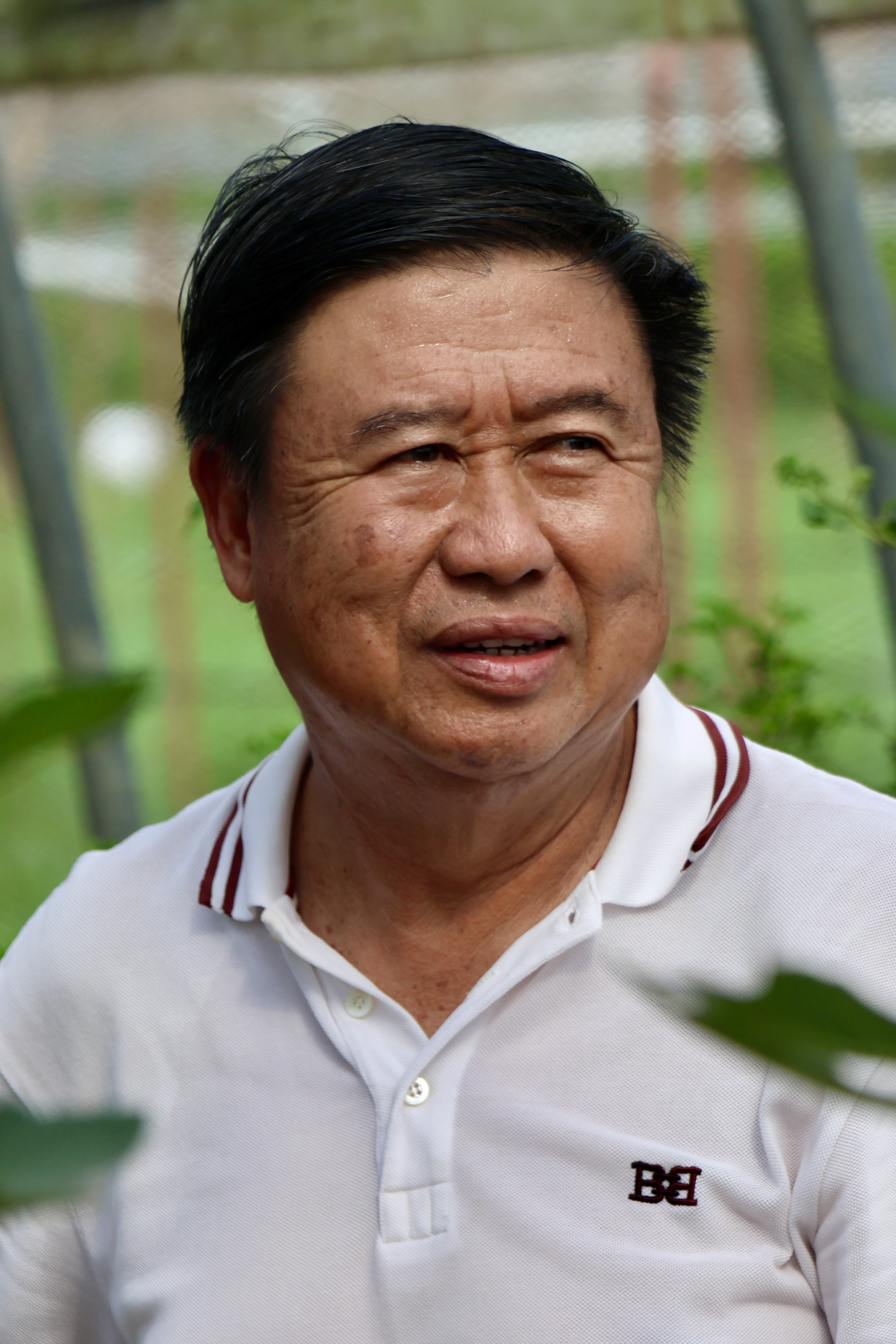
- Lau in 2024

Member of the Legislative Council
- Incumbent
- Assumed office 20 January 2023

Personal details
- Born: Lau How Teck; 1955 (age 70–71) Brunei
- Spouse: Lu Xiuling
- Children: 3
- Parent(s): Lau Ah Kok (father); Lim Kui Eng (mother)
- Education: St. Andrew's School
- Occupation: Politician; businessman
- Awards: See here

Chinese name
- Simplified Chinese: 刘孝德
- Traditional Chinese: 劉孝德
Transcriptions
Standard Mandarin
- Hanyu Pinyin: Liú Xiàodé
Southern Min
- Hokkien POJ: Lâu hàu-tek

Lau How Teck (Chinese: 刘孝德; pinyin: Liú Xiàodé; Pe̍h-ōe-jī: Lâu hàu-tek) is a Bruneian businessperson and politician of Chinese descent who was among the members of Brunei's Legislative Council (LegCo) appointed in 2023. He is a member of the Chinese General Chamber of Commerce's 43rd (2024–2026) Honorary Advisory Group in Brunei.

== Early life and education ==
Possibly inspired by his father's agricultural activities, Lau showed an early interest in farming that would become a lifelong passion and job. He showed a special interest in geography while attending St. Andrew's School (SAS); this interest in geography was probably related to his passion with the quality of soil for growing fruits and vegetables. After finishing his fifth year at SAS, Lau committed himself to helping his father on the farm, laying the foundation for his future agricultural pursuits.

== Business career ==
The Brunei Agriculture and Agrifood Department has twice awarded Lau's farm the Best Farm Award and the Best Advanced Farm Award, indicating the farm's recorded results under his management. As the farm's president, he has made sure that the Hua Ho Department Store receives the majority of the produce, which includes fruits, vegetables, poultry, and eggs, grown on the property.

After his father died in 2018, Lau assumed control of the Hua Ho Agricultural Farm and became its director. He has gradually replaced conventional farming with innovative methods on the land. He pioneered the closed-house method for raising poultry, the hydroponic and greenhouse systems for growing vegetables, and the protected culture and fertigation techniques for growing non-seasonal fruits.

Since 2000, he has raised agricultural productivity, output, and sales by utilising innovative technologies. 2013 saw 117 metric tons of fruits and vegetables grown on the farm. On 15 April 2014, the Department of Agriculture and Agrifood recognised Hua Ho Agricultural Farm and Ladang Tunas Harapan, both managed by him, with the Brunei Darussalam GAP (Good Agricultural Practice) mark. The farm was generating over 129 metric tons by 2017.

Amidst the COVID-19 pandemic in 2021, Lau reported that the Hua Ho Agricultural Farm employed around 150 people and that the labor scarcity caused the output of chickens to drop by 10%. Seventy personnel are now needed, however their work permits are past due since they went back to China. Furthermore, around twenty workers will depart and go home within the following month.

== Political career ==
On 8 January 2022, the Brunei-China Belt and Road Promotion Association's 2nd (2022–2024) Council was sworn in, with Lau serving as one of the six vice presidents. He was among the distinct individuals appointed by Sultan Hassanal Bolkiah to the LegCo on 20 January 2023. As evidence of his ardent support for public welfare programs, he has a number of esteemed positions, including directorship and honorary consultancy at many Chinese associations, Chung Hwa Middle School, Bandar Seri Begawan (CHMS, BSB), Brunei Tengyun Hall, and the China Cultural Foundation.

=== 19th LegCo session ===
On 5 March 2023, in the afternoon, members at the 19th LegCo session presented their motions of gratitude to Sultan Hassanal Bolkiah. Lau congratulated LegCo Speaker Pehin Dato Abdul Rahman on his successful leadership and session chairing, and expressed his gratitude. He declared that he fully agreed with Minister Isa's recommendations.

=== 20th LegCo session ===
The Ministry of Home Affairs' (MoHA) emphasis on the welfare of older citizens and people with disabilities (OKU) at the Immigration and National Registration Department was highlighted by Minister Ahmaddin on 4 March 2024. He underlined that in order to guarantee shorter wait times and enhance customer comfort, specific service counters are available. In response to Lau's proposal, he stated that in the midst of the digital transition, step-by-step instructions with senior-friendly interfaces are necessary. The minister gave assurances that senior citizens' requirements would continue to be met by the ministry in all ministries, and that individuals having trouble adjusting to new systems can use these counters.

Minister Abdul Manaf described cooperative agricultural research initiatives between the Department of Agriculture and Agrifood and nearby higher education institutions during the 20th LegCo meeting on 13 March 2024. He spoke of collaborations with higher education institutions such as the University of Technology Brunei (UTB) on packaging and irrigation, as well as the Institute of Brunei Technical Education (IBTE) on paddy farming, and provided an update on ongoing research on soil improvement, organic farming, vertical farming, and product shelf life conducted with Sultan Sharif Ali Islamic University (UNISSA). Furthermore, the Department of Fisheries is conducting research on fish breeding and hatcheries in collaboration with a Singaporean organisation. Lau also asked for clarity on the follow-up measures relating agricultural research and development initiatives.

During the LegCo meeting on 21 March 2024, Lau questioned the Minister of Transport and Infocommunications (MITC), Pengiran Shamhary, on how the transportation and logistics department handles cargo-related difficulties, particularly at the Muara container terminal. According to him, there were issues with queue management when loading and unloading the products of the Brunei Fertilizer Industries, which made it take a while to finish the delivery of other containers. He also inquired about the difficulties of hailing a taxi from Brunei International Airport as well as the payment rates of visitors.

The "AIPA-FAO-IISD Joint Workshop on the Implementation of the ASEAN Guidelines on Promoting Responsible Investment in Food, Agriculture, and Forestry Sectors" was held in Vientiane, Laos on 24–25 April 2024, and was attended by LegCo members Lau and Zainol Mohamed. The goal of the workshop was to strengthen parliamentary roles in promoting responsible agricultural investment and improve regional cooperation. It was organized by the Food and Agriculture Organization (FAO), the International Institute for Sustainable Development (IISD), and the ASEAN Inter-Parliamentary Assembly (AIPA). In order to assist ASEAN Parliaments in putting the ASEAN Guidelines for Responsible Investment into practice, delegates deliberated about issues pertaining to agricultural investment and created an action plan. The results of the workshop will be examined and maybe approved at the AIPA General Assembly later that year.

== Personal life ==
Born in 1955 and raised in Brunei, Lau is a native of the country. The origins of his family may be found in Pengcheng, their ancestral home, from where his great-grandfather emigrated when Emperor Jiaqing ruled the Qing dynasty. They then made their home in Tong'an County before ultimately settling in Jinmen County's Lieyu. He is Pehin Lau Ah Kok's second son. Lu Xiuling and he have three boys. He is currently a grandfather since their oldest son, Sun Zhong, was married in 2021.

== Recognition ==
Lau was granted the Peladang, Petani dan Penternak Berjaya in association with Hari Peladang, Petani dan Penternak dan Nelayan in November 2011 for his accomplishments and contributions to the agricultural industry.
