= Lau Ah Kok =

Bruneian businessman

Yang Dimuliakan Pehin Kapitan China Kornia Diraja Dato Paduka Lau Ah Kok DPMB SMB PJK
- 劉錦國
- Born: Lau Gim Kok; 26 September 1920; Lieyu, Kinmen, Republic of China
- Died: 7 January 2018 (aged 97); Manggis, Bandar Seri Begawan, Brunei
- Occupation: Businessman
- Organization: Hua Ho Department Store
- Known for: Founder of Hua Ho
- Spouse: Lim Kui Eng (m. 1950)
- Children: 7; including Lau How Teck
- Awards: Asia-Pacific Entrepreneurship Lifetime Achievement Award (2008)

Chinese name
- Simplified Chinese: 刘锦国
- Traditional Chinese: 劉錦國
Transcriptions
Standard Mandarin
- Hanyu Pinyin: Liú Jǐnguó
Southern Min
- Hokkien POJ: Lâu Kím-kok

Lau Ah Kok (Chinese: 劉錦國; pinyin: Liú Jǐnguó; Pe̍h-ōe-jī: Lâu Kím-kok; 26 September 1920 – 7 January 2018) or Lau Gim Kok, was a Bruneian aristocrat and businessman of Chinese descent who was known for establishing Hua Ho Department Store, a well-known local supermarket and department store chain as well as an agricultural farm in Brunei. He was considered to be among the richest people in Brunei.

== Early life ==
Lau was born on 26 September 1920 in Kinmen to a farmers' family and in the early years he lived with his family in Kinmen. Between the ages of 17 and 18, he left his parents behind in 1938 and moved to Nanyang. He didn't go back to the nation for the first time until 1979. He venerated his father's tomb and spent time with his relatives.

In his hometown of Lieyu, the young Lau was farming and fishing, but he had no desire to spend the rest of his life farming. His goal was to earn a life similar to that of his friends and family. For this reason, his family started raising money for entanglement when he was 18. He made a statement by leaving Lieyu and traveling to Kinmen, then on to Xiamen. He traveled via Hong Kong, Hainan, Vietnam, and Malaysia on a Dutch ship before arriving in Singapore.

Chinese labour was distributed out of Singapore; those who have just relocated here are also diligent workers. After two years, he traveled to Brunei where he reunited with his sister and eldest sister, whom he had not seen in decades. His father-in-law had him working as a clerk. Brunei has grown to be his second home ever since. He was a diligent worker, going from early in the morning till late at night. He also received a pay raise, going from 4 to 8 yuan per month.

== Career ==
Lau was 22 years old in 1942. For 160 yuan, he purchased 5 acres (2.0 ha) of property on Jalan Muara in Manggis and established the first Hua Ho Department Store to operate a small business. He first constructed a vegetable garden, employed labor to raise hens and ducks, and made a little profit. He made the decision to introduce agriculture to Brunei in 1956 after being inspired by the authorities of that nation. He employed 11 Chinese, Indian, and Malay farmers to engage in large-scale farming, and he borrowed 10,000 yuan from the government to purchase agricultural gear.

Lau was highly ambitious and wanted to advance in his job, but he failed after working too much and running out of money to have a blood transfusion, endangering his own life in 1958. Thankfully, Bruneian nobilities came to his aid, saving his life. His hometown broke the terrible news of his father's passing the same year. He had no money when he went back to his hometown. In 1959, once his condition had healed, he fired every employee, leaving the family financially independent.

The couple hurried to the market to sell the produced products after plowing the fields and tending to their hens and ducks. Around this period, Lau went from a self-sufficient small farmer to a traveling vendor who sold textiles and vegetables. This marked his transition from being a farmer to a trader. He made tiny gains as well as more selling cloth door to door. In 1966, he constructed a two-story cement structure and reconstructed the original house where he had lived. A residence occupies the top floor, while a company is located on the bottom floor. A 4.5-acre plot of property close to the Hua Ho shop was scheduled for sale in 1973. Not only did the landlord give him significant discounts, but Lau also paid in installments since the landlord had faith in him. He obtained the land's deed. The Bruneian government gave him a loan. Apart from making the initial property purchase, he utilized the remaining assets to invest in the Hua Ho Department Store's turnover.

After acquiring sufficient capital, Lau established a supermarket in Gadong as well as the first Hua Ho Department Store in Lambak. He also revived the farming business where he set up new farms in Junjongan in 1984 and Labi four years later, in which he made substantial investment in machinery and better farming methods. He then decided to relinquish the retail business to his children where he could focus on the farming business. Nevertheless, both businesses finally took hold and become successful. The department store eventually became the largest retail business in the country with nine stores altogether located in Brunei-Muara and Tutong Districts, where as the farms generated substantial produce – it produces about 10,000 tonnes of oranges annually, sells 1,000 broiler chicken per hour and seven tonnes of vegetables; all are supplied to the Hua Ho supermarket stores.

== Personal life ==
Pehin Lau married Lim Kui Eng (1934–2018) in 1950, and together they have 3 sons and 4 daughters; with the second son being Lau How Teck, a member of the Legislative Council. At the time of his death, he has fifteen grandchildren and two great-grandchildren.

== Death ==
Pehin Lau died on 7 January 2018 at his residence in Manggis, at the age of 98. Later on the 10th, the CEO of the Overseas Chinese Affairs Office, together with county and government councilors from Jinmen, came in Brunei to pay their respects. Pehin Goh, the chairman and president of the Chung Hwa Middle School, Bandar Seri Begawan (CHMS, BSB), the Taipei Economic and Cultural Office in Brunei, the Fujian Association of Brunei, and Tengyun Hall were among the more than sixty Chinese organisations that attended his burial. The government also sent representatives to honor him, including the Chinese communities, foreign diplomats, the royal family, and other circles.

== Titles, styles and honours ==
=== Honours ===
In 2004, Lau was granted, by the Sultan of Brunei Sultan Hassanal Bolkiah, the titular position of manteri, a class of nobility (similar to the British life peerage), with the title Pehin Kapitan China Kornia Di-Raja for his contributions to the local Chinese community and government activities. He was one of the few local Chinese commoners in the nobility. Two years later, he was also awarded by the Sultan a service medal which came with the title Dato Paduka. He would go on to earned the following honours:

- Order of Seri Paduka Mahkota Brunei Second Class (DPMB; 15 July 2006) – Dato Paduka
- Order of Seri Paduka Mahkota Brunei Third Class (SMB; 1999)
- Meritorious Service Medal (PJK; 2010)

=== Awards ===
In 2008, he was awarded the Asia-Pacific Entrepreneurship Lifetime Achievement Award by Enterprise Asia, a Kuala Lumpur-based organisation, for his business achievements locally.
