= Ong Tiong Oh =

Bruneian businessman and politician (born 1953)

- 王长荷

Member of the Legislative Council
- In office 13 January 2017 – 6 March 2022
- Monarch: Hassanal Bolkiah

Personal details
- Born: Ong Tiong Oh; 28 August 1953 (age 73) Brunei
- Parent: Ong Ling Tian (father)
- Education: Sultan Omar Ali Saifuddien College
- Occupation: Businessman; philanthropist; politician

Chinese name
- Simplified Chinese: 王长荷
- Traditional Chinese: 王長荷
Transcriptions
Standard Mandarin
- Hanyu Pinyin: Wáng Zhǎnghé
Southern Min
- Hokkien POJ: Ông Tiông-ô

Ong Tiong Oh (Chinese: 王长荷; pinyin: Wáng Zhǎnghé; born 28 August 1953) is a Brunei Chinese businessman, philanthropist and politician who was a member of the Legislative Council (LegCo) from 2017 to 2022. Notably, he is also the Chung Hwa Middle School, Bandar Seri Begawan (CHMS, BSB) Board of Directors' vice-chairman, and St. George's School Board of Governors' chairman.

== Early career ==
Ong obtained his early education from the Sultan Omar Ali Saifuddien College, and later began working with Low San Hardware in 1973, and in 2011 he helped grow it into Low San Manufacturing. His father, the late business tycoon Ong Ling Tian founded Low San, which dominated Brunei's hardware market from the 1950s through the 1980s. Following his father's death, the siblings divided the empire into Low San, Hang San, Lian San, Kim San, and Hua San. The only son, Ong, seized control of Low San. The hardware sector in the nation is still firmly under the control of the Ong family.

Ong founded a second location called "The Tool Box" in 2010 and serves as the company's managing director as well. Since 2015, he has served as the Chinese School's board chairman. On 13 January 2017, he was chosen to serve in the Legislative Council.

== Political career ==
On 14 November 2017, the Ministry of Development and the departments that fall under it held a discussion session with select Members of LegCo at Dewan Betabur. Ong was in charge of the group of Honorable Members of LegCo. He claimed that CHMS, BSB is a non-profit institution of higher learning that does not prioritize making a profit. The school also makes efforts to find additional funding sources, such as private donations and public donations, to help with operating costs. In 2018, alcoholic beverages with valid permits transported into Brunei would be subject to taxed, according to Ong Tiong Oh. He added that the money raised might be used to cover the expenses of the inspections that law enforcement officials conducted at the border control station. Dato Mohd Amin's reaction praised Ong's idea and stated that the ministry would investigate its practicality. On 12 April 2022, the Department of Councils of State declared that the appointed members of the LegCo were dissolved on 6 March.

== Personal life ==
Ong is married and their residence is located at Jalan Kebangsaan, Bandar Seri Begawan. He also possesses the skill to play the drums.

== Philanthropy ==
=== Basketball ===
In 2019, the Veteran Low San Shield basketball competition was held and Ong and Mathew Boyd gave a sponsorship check for $10,000 to the Brunei Basketball Association (BBA) for hosting the competition during the opening ceremony. On 2 October 2023, the Low San Basketball Tournament began at the Batu Bersurat court of the BBA. A month-long basketball festival involving several of the nation's best players will start with the well-liked domestic competition. Following the first game, the opening ceremony took place. Ong was present as the honoree.

=== Pedestrian bridge ===
Speaking to the media on the sidelines of the Ong Tiong Oh Pedestrian Bridge's official opening and handover in 2015, the Pehin Suyoi promised that pedestrians and students would no longer be at risk of accidents of this nature and thanked Ong, who is also the Director of Low San Hardware, for sponsoring the bridge's construction. The building of the bridge connecting the capital's CHMS, BSB aids in lowering the number of incidents involving pupils crossing the busy road. The contract price for this bridge project is approximately $780,000. However, the cost of the bridge is between $800,000 and $850,000 due to overruns in the relocation service. The Brunei judiciary deemed the Pro-Builder Sdn Bhd v. Ong Tiong Oh case "important as a growing number of litigants look towards other dispute resolution avenues."

=== COVID-19 relief fund ===
After Pehin Goh, Hua Ho, Guan Hock Lee, and Swee Construction, Ong Tiong Oh is the fifth donor to contribute six figures to the COVID-19 relief fund with a donation of B$100,000 on 28 August 2021. He gave a similar sum of $100,000 the previous year.

== Political positions ==
According to Ong, Brunei was eagerly anticipating President Xi Jinping's visit. He expressed his optimism that through mutually beneficial collaboration under the Belt and Road Initiative, the friendship between Brunei and China could remain solid in a variety of areas, including economy and technology.
