= Mary Lim =

Bruneian businesswoman and educator (born 1948)

Mary Lim PJK PIKB
- 许媽樱
- Born: Hii Yang Eng; 1948 (age 76–77); Sibu, Crown Colony of Sarawak (present day Malaysia)
- Education: Chung Ching Middle School
- Occupations: Businesswoman; teacher
- Known for: Founder and CEO of Seri Mulia Sarjana School
- Spouse: Steven Lim Chi Lun
- Children: 3

Chinese name
- Simplified Chinese: 许媽樱
- Traditional Chinese: 許媽櫻
Transcriptions
Standard Mandarin
- Hanyu Pinyin: Xǔ Māyīng
Yue: Cantonese
- Jyutping: Heoi2 Maa2 Jing1
Southern Min
- Hokkien POJ: Hí Má-eng

Mary Lim (née Hii Yang Eng; Chinese: 许媽樱; pinyin: Xǔ Māyīng; born 1948) is a Bruneian educator and businesswoman of Chinese descent. Best known as the CEO and founder of Seri Mulia Sarjana School (SMS), she has made contributions to both education and business in Brunei.

== Early life and education ==
Mary Lim, born Hii Yang Eng in 1948 in Sibu, Crown Colony of Sarawak, was the second eldest of ten siblings, with three sisters and six brothers. At the age of five, her parents moved the family to Brunei, where she attended Chung Ching Middle School (CCMS) in Seria. Although she harboured a strong ambition to pursue higher education, she had to forgo this dream after graduating from secondary school in 1965 due to her family's financial constraints.

== Career ==
Lim started her teaching career at Kampong Sungai Liang's Chung Lian School, a modest establishment with just a few dozen students. She returned to CCMS, her old mater, in 1970 and spent six years teaching mathematics and Chinese. Her desire of opening her own school was made possible by her 10 years of teaching expertise. With just 34 pupils, she established Sunshine School, a kindergarten in Kampong Beribi, Bandar Seri Begawan, as her first educational institution in 1985. Despite a number of obstacles, such as fierce rivalry and a lack of money, her teaching style enabled the school to expand quickly, reaching 500 pupils in just five years. However, in 1990—the year she and her family moved to Australia—unexpected events compelled Lim to sell the school. Her main reason for immigrating was to give her three children access to a more extensive educational system, in addition to wanting to change her surroundings.

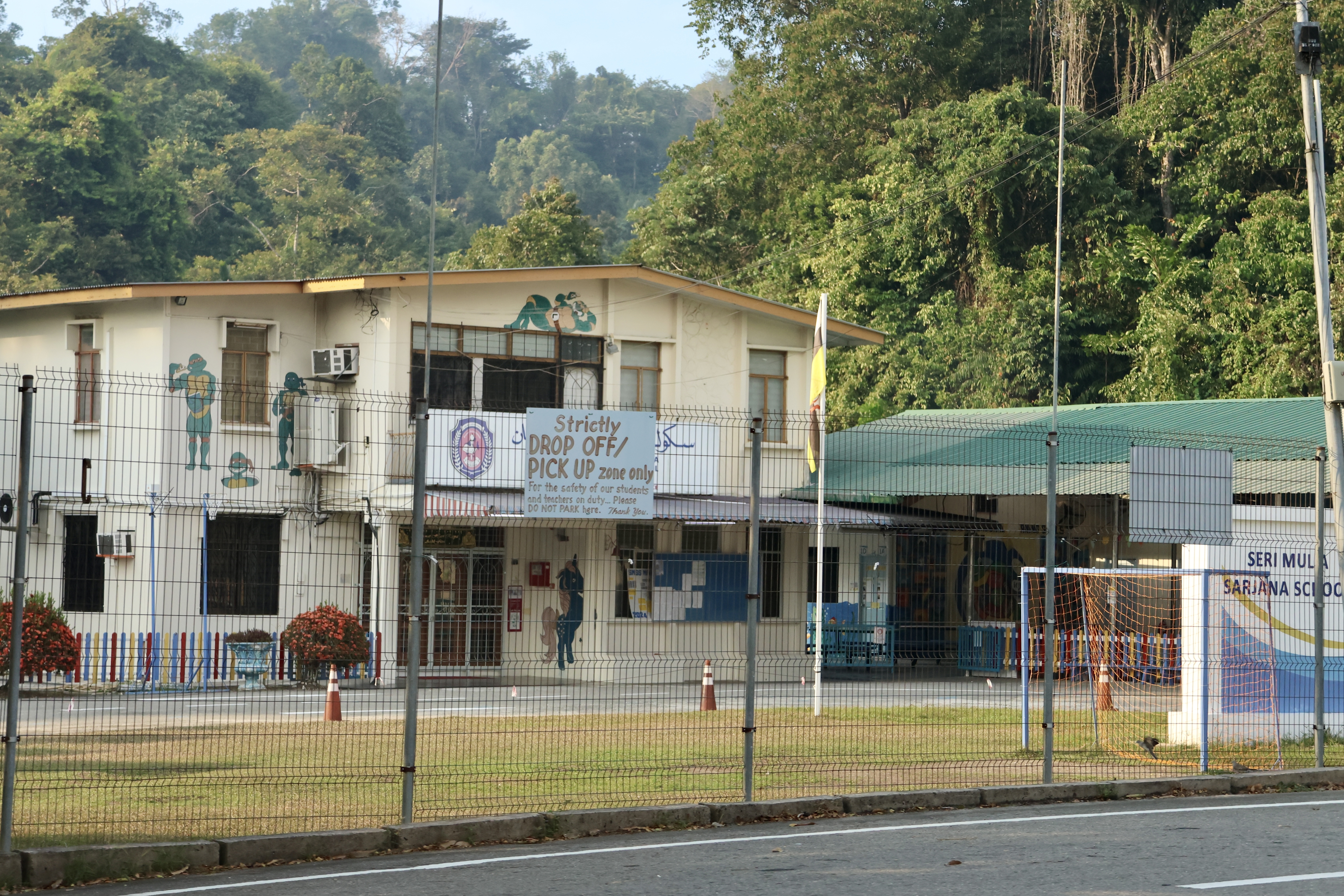
SMS School Primary Section

Lim barely stayed in Australia for two weeks before leaving to follow her goal back in Brunei. She established her second school, the SMS School (originally PDS School), in 1992 with the help of neighborhood partners. SMS operated entirely on tuition fees, in contrast to private Chinese schools that profit from both school fees and community support, and local government schools that receive full subsidies. The school thrived in spite of these obstacles, growing from 1,000 pupils in five years to 2,000 by the time it celebrated its tenth anniversary in 2002. With the help of more than 200 employees, SMS and its sister school, SMS International School (previously PDS International School), have expanded from their initial 14 students to over 3,000 students spread across three sites.

In order to shorten the typical five-year secondary course to four years, Lim brought the "express class" concept from abroad to Brunei in 2001. This program focused on academically talented pupils who could finish school more quickly, saving parents money. Since the idea was relatively new in the nation, Lim first had a difficult time getting the Ministry of Education to approve it. But in the end, the method was authorised by the government, which was a significant development in Brunei's educational history. She also adamantly thinks that extracurricular activities boost students' self-expression, teamwork, confidence, and excitement for learning.

In addition to teaching, Lim has a number of enterprises in Australia, Malaysia, and Brunei. Her businesses cover a wide range of sectors, such as the import and export of health, beauty, and educational materials through Rising Star Educational materials in Australia and Wakim Enterprise in Brunei. She has also founded educational institutions including Hillcrest Academy in Malaysia and Rising Star Children Development Centre in Brunei, as well as enterprises like Nyonya Restaurant in Brunei, Long Sheng, a property development company in Brunei, Bajoo Fashion House, a clothes store in Brunei, and a chain store in Brunei called Yushahmin Enterprise—The Life Shop.

== Personal life ==
Lim is married to Steven Lim Chi Lun, and they have two daughters and a son, all of whom are actively involved in managing her various businesses. Her eldest daughter, Sophia Lim Ming Pey, oversees the SMS School, while her second daughter, Rita Lim Ming Yee, manages the SMS International School. Her son, Leonard Lim Kuan Horng, assists with the management of several other ventures.

== Awards and honours ==
In 2007, Lim received an honorary Doctor of Philosophy in educational management from the International American University in recognition of her contributions to education. That year also she was honoured with the 6th Asia Pacific International Entrepreneur Excellence Award in Kuala Lumpur, standing out as the only female recipient. Throughout her career, Lim has picked up some awards, including:

=== Awards ===
- Asia Pacific International Entrepreneur Excellence Award (2007)
- 中國百名優秀全業家奮門史 [100 Outstanding Chinese Entrepreneurs Struggle History] (in Chinese). China Economic Press. 1 July 2013. ISBN 978-7513622431.
- Inspire's The 50 Most Influential Women in Brunei (2014)

=== Honours ===
- Meritorious Service Medal (PJK; 26 October 2010)
- Excellent Service Medal (PIKB; 23 October 2002)
