= Kampong Manggis =

Manggis Kampung Manggis
- Village and neighbourhood
- Kampong Manggis
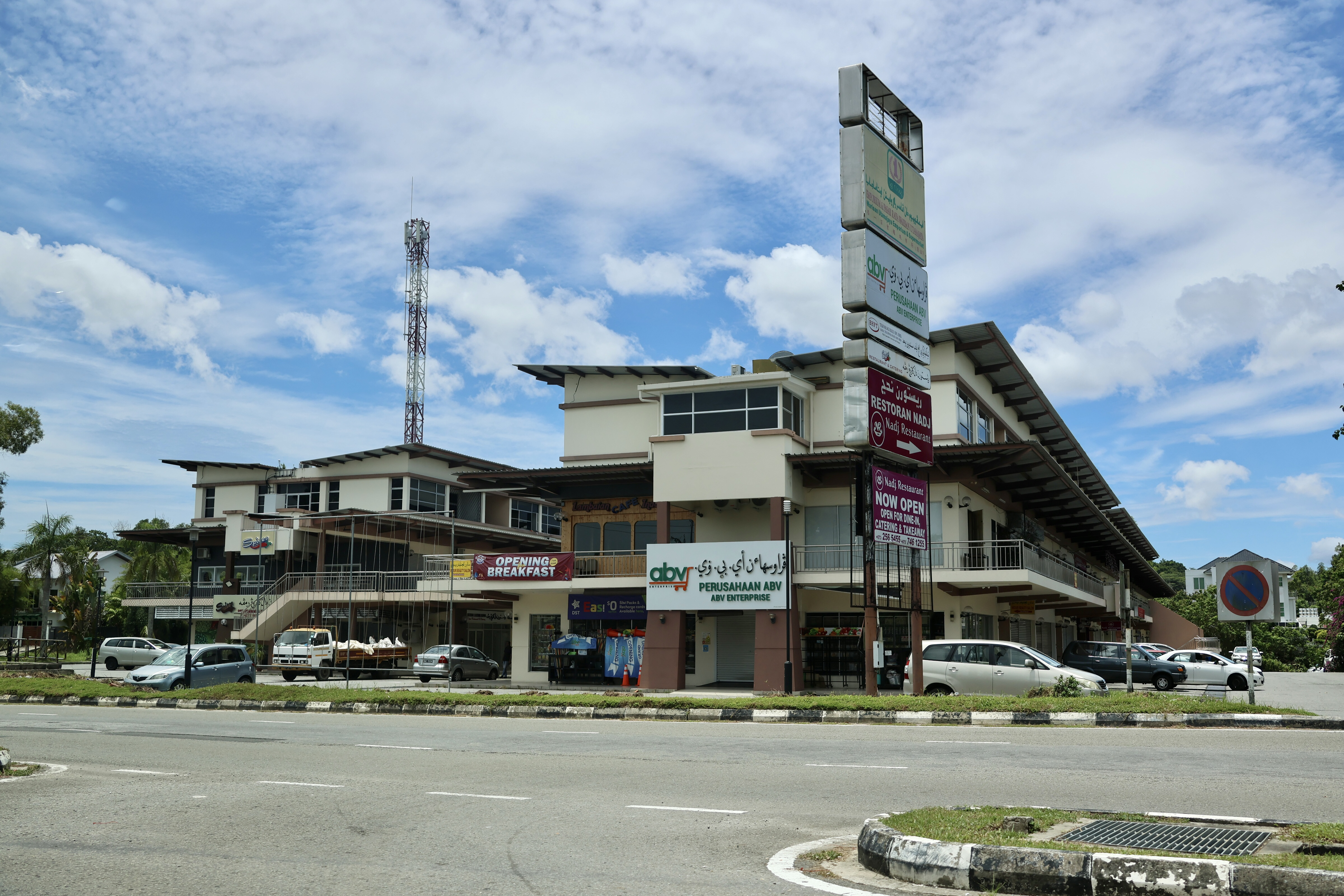

- Location in Brunei
- Coordinates: 4°57′16″N 114°57′45″E
- Country: Brunei
- District: Brunei-Muara
- Mukim: Berakas 'B'

Government
  - Village head: Omar Mohd Alli

Population (2016)
  - Total: 4,229
- Time zone: UTC+8 (BNT)
- Postcode: BC3615

Kampong Manggis is a village in Brunei-Muara District, Brunei, as well as a neighbourhood in the capital Bandar Seri Begawan. The population was 4,229 in 2016. It is one of the villages within Mukim Berakas 'B'. The postcode is BC3615.

== Etymology ==
The name Kampong Manggis is derived from a large mangosteen tree that was located in the house of the former head of the village once upon a time.

== Administration ==
Apart from being a village subdivision, Kampong Manggis has also been subsumed under the municipal area of the capital Bandar Seri Begawan.

== Infrastructure ==
With its strategic position, Kampong Manggis is now packed with developments such as private houses, supermarkets, schools and a mosque. This village, which has a population of over 3,000 people, also receives basic facilities provided by the government, such as roads, electricity, telephone, water, Pancha Harapan stalls.

Suri Seri Begawan Raja Pengiran Anak Damit Mosque is the village mosque for Kampong Manggis and the neighbouring Kampong Madang. It was inaugurated by Sultan Hassanal Bolkiah in 2014. The mosque can accommodate 2,400 worshippers.

== Notable people ==
- Mohammad Abdul Rahman Piut (1906–1971), politician and nobleman
- Lau Ah Kok (1920–2018), businessperson
- Ahmad Wally Skinner (1925–2003), politician
- Yahya Ibrahim (1939–2022), politician and writer
