= Hua Ho Department Store =

- Native name: 华和百货商场 | Gedung Perniagaan Aman Jaya | ڬدوڠ ڤرنياڬاْن امان جاي
- Type: Private
- Traded as: Hua Ho
- Industry: Retail
- Founded: 1947; 79 years ago Kampong Manggis
- Founder: Lau Gim Kok
- Headquarters: Bandar Seri Begawan, Brunei
- Number of locations: 13
- Area served: Brunei
- Key people: Low Haw Wei (CEO)
- Products: Supermarket; Department Store
- Owner: Lau Gim Kok Family
- Subsidiaries: Hua Ho Agricultural Farms; Hua Ho Cultural Sdn Bhd
- Website: huaho.com

Hua Ho Department Store is a Bruneian retail and supermarket conglomerate and the country's largest homegrown department store chain, established in 1947 by the late Pehin Kapitan China Kornia Diraja Dato Paduka Lau Ah Kok. Operating as a diversified enterprise, the company utilizes a "farm-to-shelf" business model, integrating its retail network with its own agricultural and poultry farms to ensure national food security and product freshness. With over 13 locations across the Brunei-Muara District and Tutong District, it serves as a primary hub for international brands in fashion, electronics, and household goods while remaining a leading distributor of locally produced agricultural goods.

== Locations ==
Hua Ho currently has 13 locations: Minimart, Sengkurong, Gadong 2, Yayasan, Kiulap, Delima, Manggis, Tanjong Bunut, Tutong, Mulaut, Bebatik Kilanas, Onecity Sungai Hanching, and Kpg Salar.

== Inhouse Brands ==
Due to increasing demand, Hua Ho has started to manufacture their own inhouse brand, BONUS, which sells electrical and daily used goods such as tissues and detergents.

== Loyalty Cards ==
Hua Ho have also introduced two loyalty cards: the H2 card and the SYMB card. These two loyalty cards operate by different rewarding systems.

=== H2 ===
The use of H2 card is applicable in 9 Hua Ho outlets, namely:

- Kiulap
- Delima
- Tutong
- Gadong 2
- Mini Mart
- Mulaut
- Bebatik Kilanas
- Sungai Hanching
- Kg Salar

=== SYMB ===
In the year 2008, Hua Ho Department Store launched the SYMB Bonus Card for its outlets,

- Sengkurong
- Manggis
- Tanjong Bunut
- Yayasan

== Controversy ==
During May 2015, reports spread throughout Brunei that Hua Ho were selling fake eggs imported from China. However, the Bruneian Department of Agriculture and Agrifoods quickly denied this allegation; simply saying, 'Hua Ho Department Store does not import chicken eggs from any external sources as the production at the Hua Ho farm is sufficient as sale stocks at their department stores.'

== Closure of Yayasan branch ==
After 21 years of service at the SYMB branch, Hua Ho announced that the Yayasan branch will close its doors on 16 January 2018.
