= Pengiran Mohammad Abdul Rahman Piut =

Bruneian civil servant (1906–1976)

Yang Teramat Mulia Seri Paduka Pengiran Temenggong Sahibul Bahar Pengiran Mohammed DK SPMB DSNB PANB MBE POAS PHBS PJK
- ڤڠيرن محمد
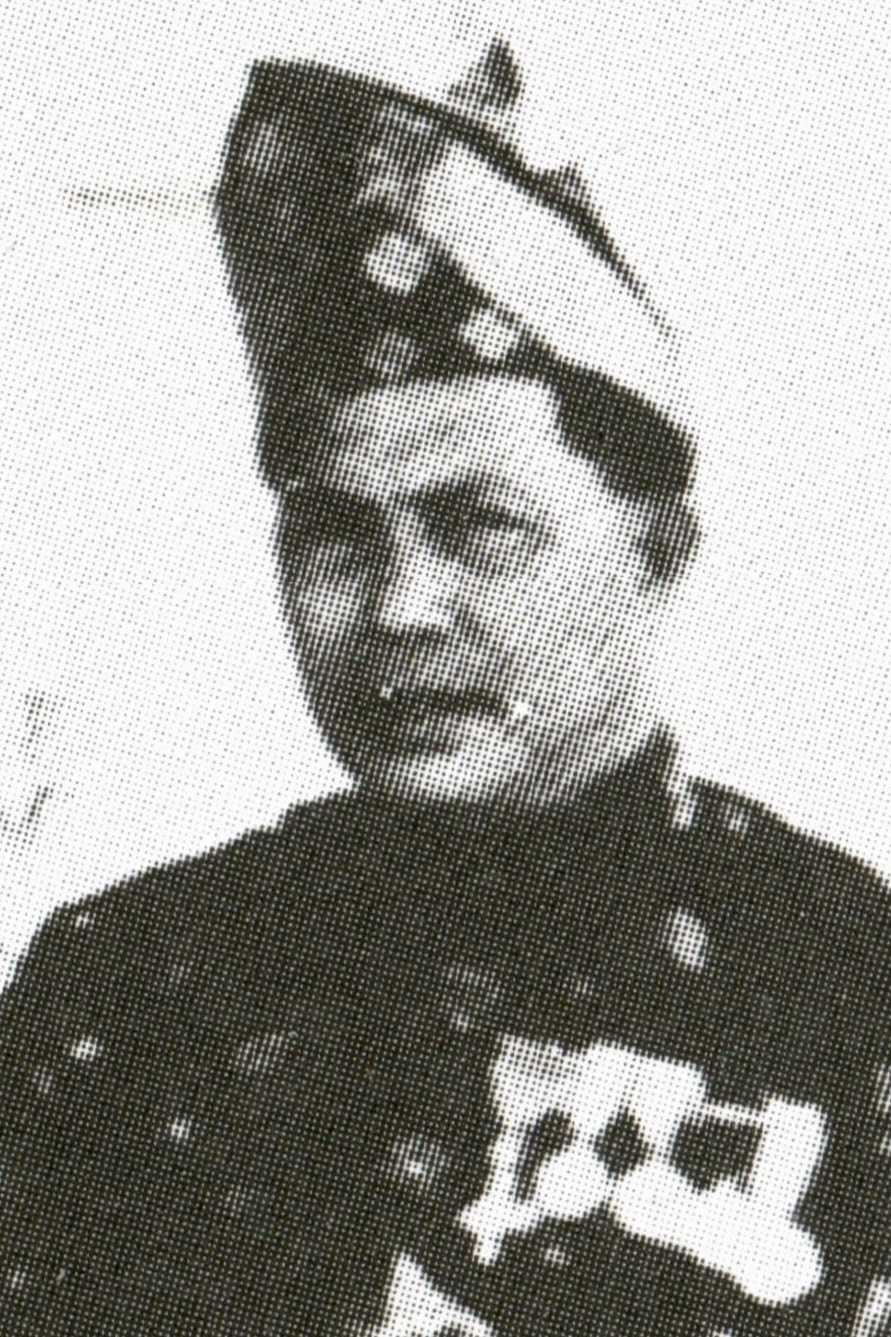
- Pengiran Mohammad in 1953
- Born: 1906; Brunei
- Died: 25 May 1976 (aged 71); Brunei General Hospital, Bandar Seri Begawan, Brunei
- Resting place: Royal Mausoleum, Bandar Seri Begawan, Brunei
- Education: Melaka Teacher Training College
- Occupations: Civil servant; teacher
- Spouses: Raden Mas Dino; Raden Mas Raudzahtun Nadzrah
- Relatives: Pengiran Jaya (nephew); Pengiran Mokhtar Puteh (nephew); Pengiran Umar (nephew); Pengiran Ibnu Basit (nephew); A. M. Azahari (nephew); Abdullah Hanafi (father-in-law)

Pengiran Mohammad bin Pengiran Abdul Rahman Piut (Note: The former spelling of his given name is "Pengiran Mohamed" rather than "Pengiran Mohammad," while his patronymic is written as "Pengiran Piut" instead of "Pengiran Abdul Rahman Piut.") (1906 – 25 May 1976) was a noble civil servant who held the position of Pengiran Temenggong in Brunei. Serving from 1971 to 1976, this title represents the fourth most senior rank within the wazir class of state officials. In addition, during the 1960s and 1970s, he occasionally served as a member of both the Legislative Council (LegCo) and the Privy Council of Brunei.

Pengiran Mohammad played a significant role in documenting Brunei's history, particularly in tracing key events before and after the Second World War. He contributed valuable insights, especially regarding Kampong Ayer and the administration of that era. His involvement in the development of Brunei's telecommunication services marked him as a pioneer in the field, and his contributions have left a lasting impact on the growth and progress of telecommunications in the country.

== Early life and education ==
Pengiran Mohammad, born in 1906, was the son of Pengiran Abdul Rahman Piut and Pengiran Fatimah. He came from humble beginnings and had limited formal education. Despite this, he was selected as one of two teachers to be sent to Melaka Teacher Training College in Malacca, Malaya, for further training.

== Career ==
His career began as a teacher at a Malay school. Later, he started assisting a European wireless officer, despite the language barrier, as neither spoke the other's language. Determined to overcome this challenge, he taught himself English, eventually mastering it to a level unmatched by his Malay peers in Brunei, both in writing and speaking. Once he was satisfied with his proficiency in English, he turned his attention to wireless techniques, which eventually led to his promotion to the position of wireless officer—a role previously never held by a native—followed by his appointment as Malay secretary.

In April 1926, after the recall of L. R. Watts to Singapore, Pengiran Mohammad assumed the role of acting officer in charge of the Wireless Department. From 1928 onwards, he formally oversaw the department. Additionally, he served as an honorary aide-de-camp to Sultan Ahmad Tajuddin during the sultan's travels to Peninsular Malaya in 1931 and later to England in 1932, where the sultan stayed for about ten months before returning to Brunei in August 1933.

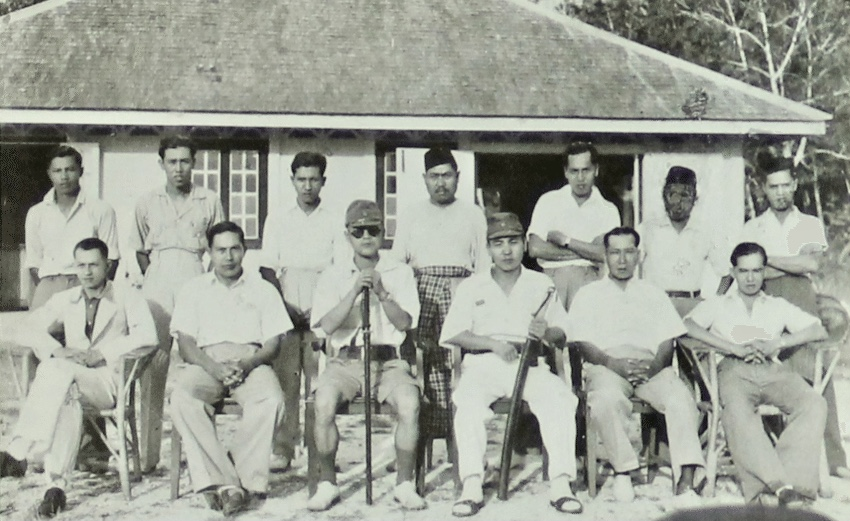
Pengiran Mohammad (seated second from the left) with Japanese soldiers in 1942

During the Japanese occupation of Brunei from 1941 to 1945, Pengiran Mohammad continued to serve as the state wireless officer, maintaining his role under the new regime despite the expulsion of foreign workers. He endured punishment and significant hardship, with his family facing great difficulties during the war. Accused of spying, he was imprisoned by the Kempeitai, and although in danger, his family regularly visited him. During one visit, he secretly wrote a letter reassuring his wife of his safety. A planned escape led the family to flee into the jungle, where they hid until the Japanese left, with neighbours falsely reporting his death to mislead their captors.

In May 1945, Pengiran Mohammad, weakened by both torture and malaria, lay near death in a jungle hut. A Chinese man, Chiam, limped toward him, though he, too, was in poor condition, having resorted to eating a dog to survive. The two men, both suffering under Japanese occupation, exchanged a brief conversation, with Pengiran Mohammad inquiring about medicine. Despite Chiam's efforts, the Kempeitai refused to provide treatment unless he came personally. As hope for an Allied rescue faded, both men faced the grim reality of their impending deaths.

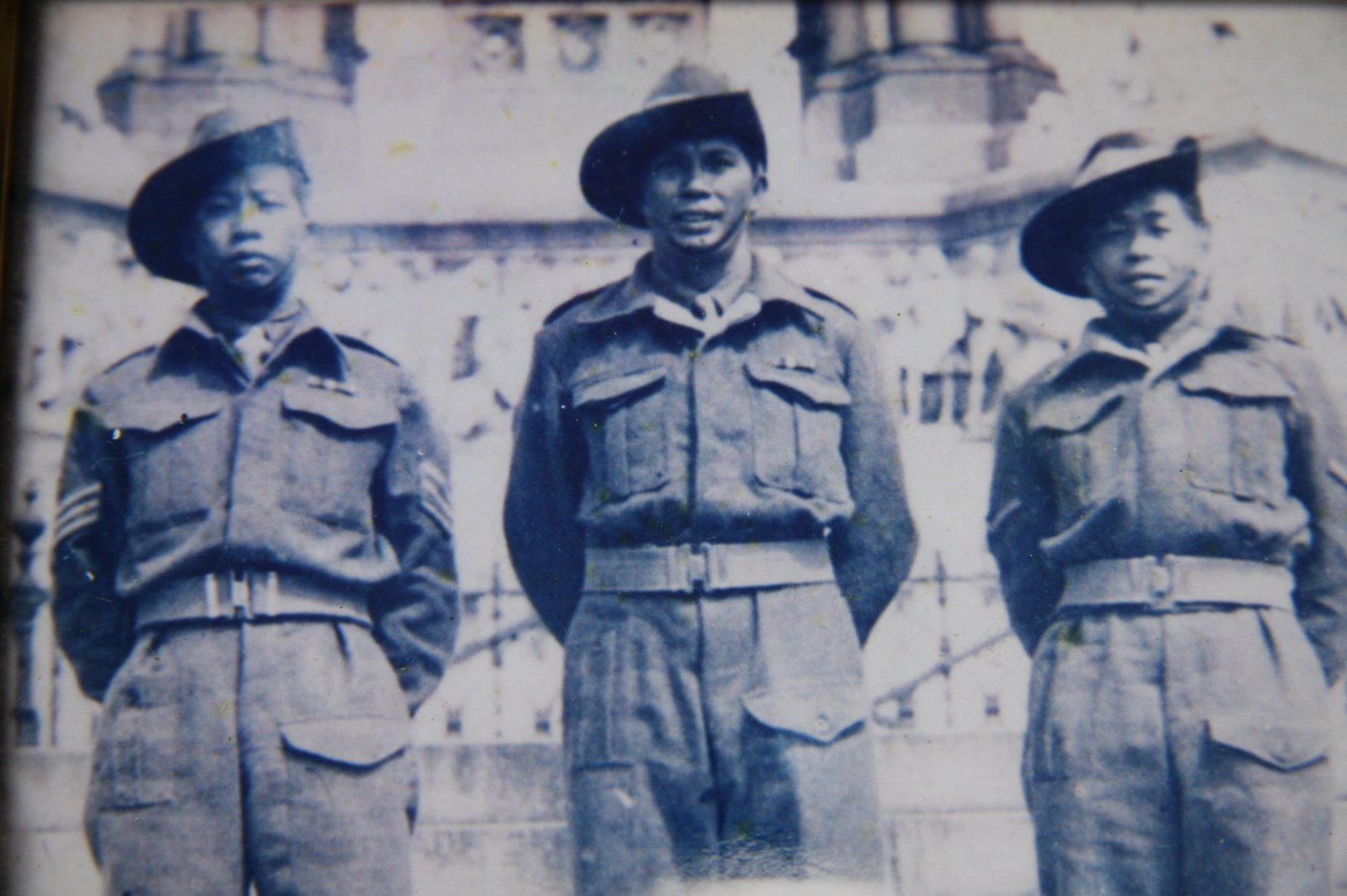
Pengiran Mohammad (centre) at the 1946 London Victory celebrations

However, when the Australian Army liberated Brunei in mid-1945, Pengiran Mohammad's spirits lifted. Regaining some of his former vitality, he eagerly asked to try out a jeep. Months later, he received exciting news: he had been selected to travel to London as part of the 1946 Victory celebrations, in recognition of his contributions during the Japanese occupation. Proudly dressed in a British Army officer's uniform, he set off for London.

Following the end of World War II, on 6 April 1948, Pengiran Mohammad became a member of the State Council. In the same year, he founded the Brunei State Red Cross Association, which later became the Brunei Darussalam Red Crescent Society.

British Resident Eric Ernest Falk Pretty attempted to dissuade Pengiran Mohammad from aiding his nephew, A. M. Azahari, in returning to Brunei, claiming that President Sukarno had negatively influenced him. Despite this, Pengiran Mohammad ultimately assisted in transporting Azahari after his secret arrival in Labuan, where he first reunited with his father before reaching Brunei in October 1952.

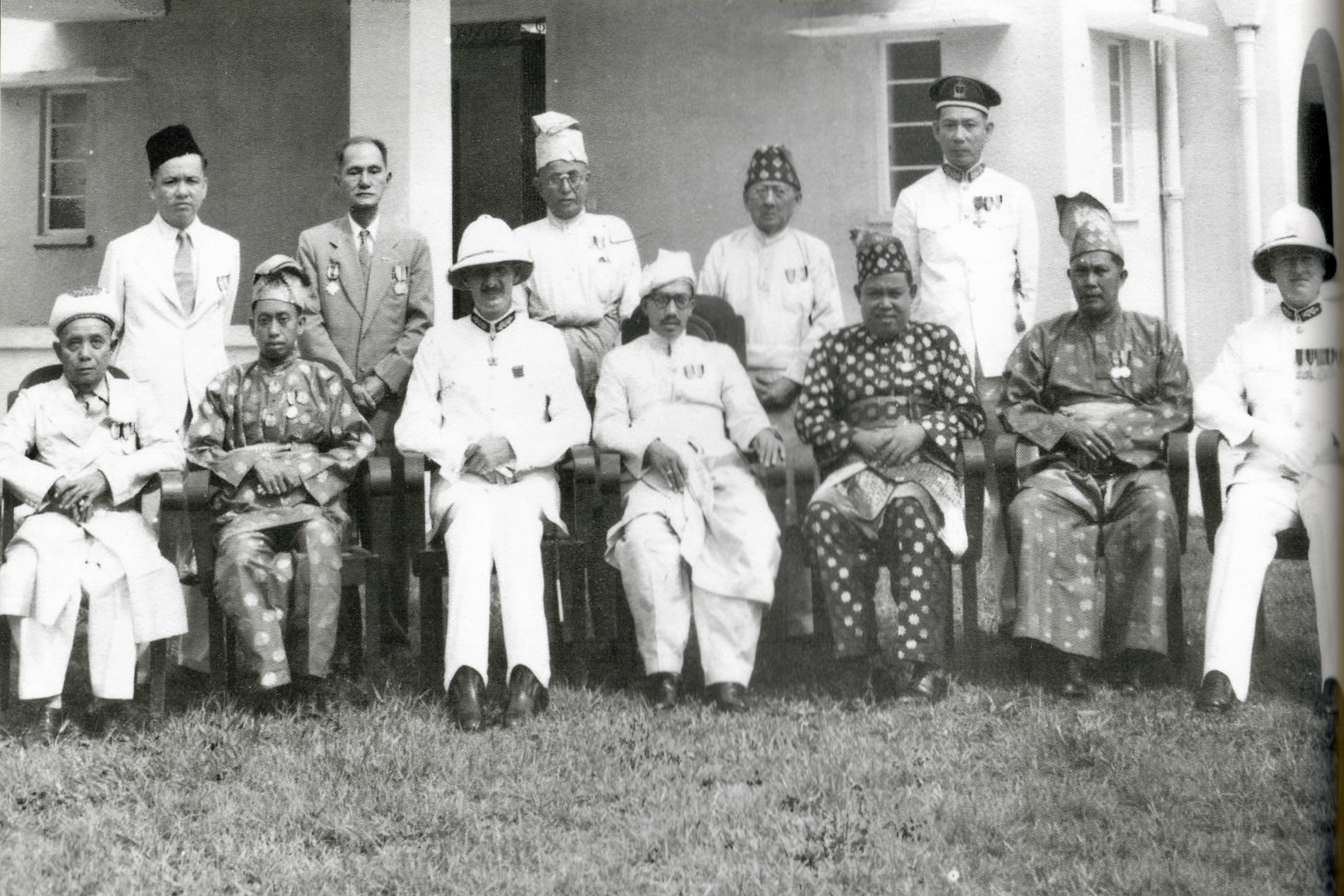
Pengiran Mohammad (seated second from the right) with other State Council members in 1951

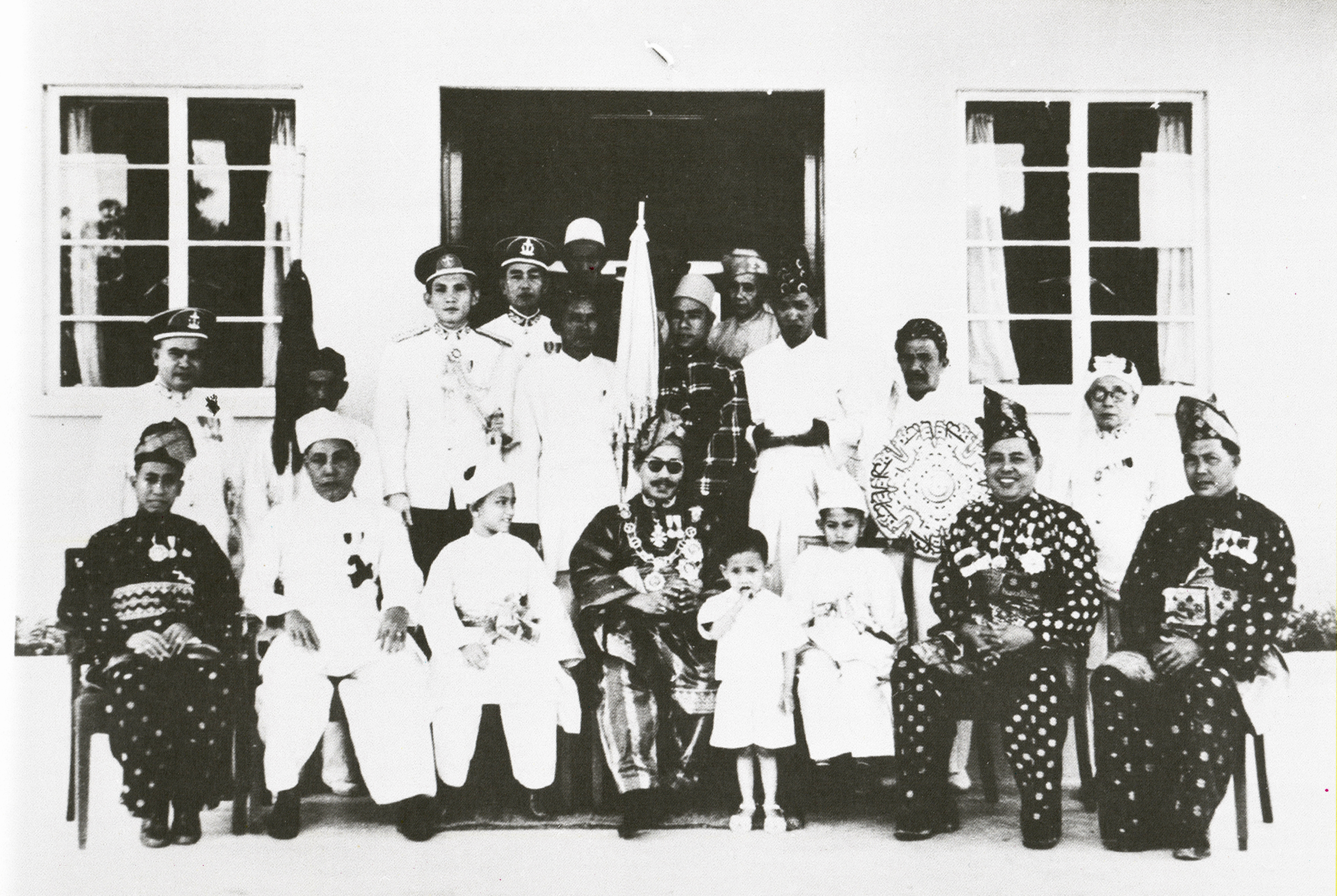
Pengiran Mohammad (seated first on the right) with Sultan Omar Ali Saifuddien III (centre) and other state dignitaries in 1953

In February 1956, during the State Council meeting, Sultan Omar Ali Saifuddien III appointed Pengiran Anak Mohamed Alam and Pengiran Mohammad as members of the Brunei State Financial Authority. That same month, he was also appointed as a committee member of the Brunei Sports Club during its inaugural General Meeting. In April, he became a member of the pension selection committee for the elderly in Brunei Town. Later that year, on 29 August, he traveled to Singapore to attend the Regional Commonwealth Ministry Conference for Malaya and British Borneo. Before the conference, he attended the opening of the Second Legislative Council Meeting in Singapore, and after its conclusion, he continued to Kuching for the regatta in the second week of September.

By 1957, Pengiran Mohammad became the controller of telecommunications. In 1958, he was one of the founding members of the Royal Brunei Yacht Club. The following year, on 12 February 1959, he represented Brunei at the Regional Telecommunications Conference in Singapore before returning on 14 February. Later that year, in October, he was appointed as a member of the Brunei Islamic Religious Council and Customs Council under the Religious, Customs, and State Court Law.

Pengiran Mohammad was elected commodore of the Royal Brunei Yacht Club during its annual general meeting on 20 March 1960. In April, he and one other traveled to Formosa to attend the opening of the Taipei Grand Mosque, aiming to strengthen ties between Brunei and the Muslims in China.

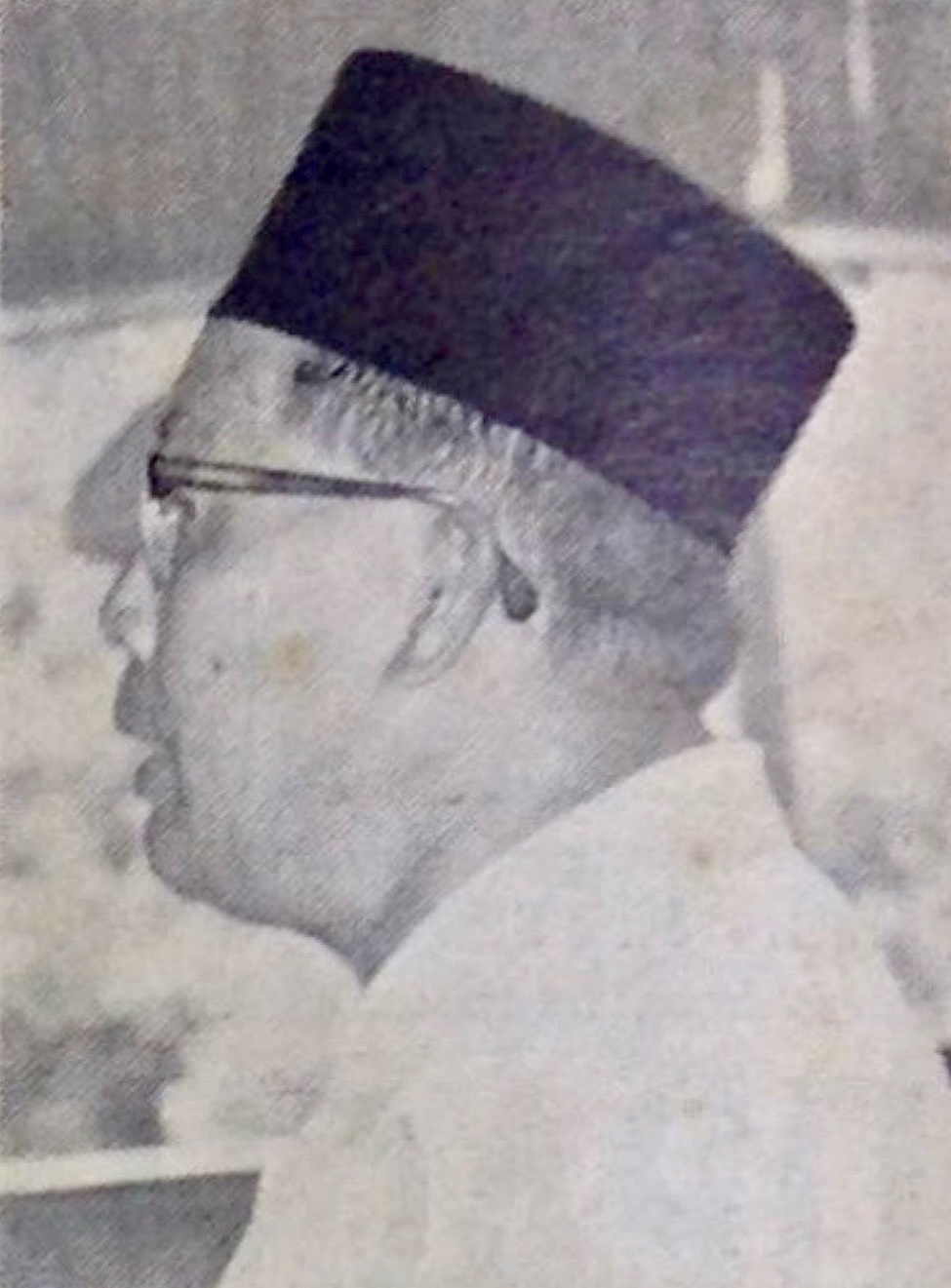
Pengiran Mohammad delivering a speech at the official opening of Orang Kaya Besar Imas Malay School in 1961

On 23 July 1961, he formally inaugurated the Kampong Menengah Malay School in Lamunin, accompanied by key figures such as Othman Bidin and several officials from the Department of Information and Radio. On 14 August, he attended the instalment ceremony at Istana Darul Hana, where Prince Hassanal Bolkiah was officially proclaimed the new Pengiran Muda Mahkota (Crown Prince). Later, on 6 November, he delivered a speech at the official opening of Orang Kaya Besar Imas Malay School in Subok. He was also unanimously reappointed as chairman of the Brunei Town Football Association during its annual general meeting, held on 25 October at the Dewan Kemasharakatan conference room.

By 1962, Pengiran Mohammad was a member of the Privy Council. On 4 May, he accompanied the sultan on his hajj pilgrimage to Mecca, departing from Brunei Airport for Singapore. Later, on 25 September, he joined a Brunei government delegation that traveled to Singapore en route to Kuala Lumpur for informal talks with the Malayan government regarding Brunei’s potential entry into the Malaysian Federation. In early October, he was appointed as a member of the LegCo. On 24 October, he officially inaugurated Bakiau Malay School in Tutong, praising the villagers for their efforts in establishing the school despite its modest structure. Following the Brunei revolt in December, Pengiran Mohammad, alongside other high-ranking officials, reaffirmed their unwavering loyalty to the sultan. They pledged to sacrifice everything to combat treason and strongly condemned the rebellion led by Azahari, rejecting his false claims that the uprising had the support of the Bruneian people.

Pengiran Mohammad was part of a Brunei delegation in Kuala Lumpur from 3 to 4 February 1963, engaging in informal talks about Brunei's potential entry into Malaysia. The delegation, which included senior officials, discussed the terms for Brunei's inclusion in Malaysia before seeking approval from the sultan. Official negotiations with the Malayan government were expected to follow once the sultan's consent was granted. He was also part of the Brunei government delegation that traveled to Kuala Lumpur in June 1963 for final negotiations, led by Marsal Maun, regarding Brunei's potential inclusion in the Malaysian Federation. Additionally, in September 1963, he participated in a rowing team led by the sultan that won a five-man boat race on the Tutong River during the sultan's birthday celebrations in the district.

He was part of the sultan's entourage to Calgary in May 1964. Later that year, on 14 September, he presented honours on behalf of the sultan to ten Malaysians who had served the Brunei government. He, accompanied by Pengiran Anak Mohamed Alam, returned to Brunei on 7 February 1965 from the United Kingdom, where they had traveled in January to accompany several members of the royal family, including two princes, who were continuing their studies. He presented honours once again on behalf of the sultan to five Malaysians on 22 June. Additionally, he traveled to Kuala Lumpur on 14 July to attend the monthly Telecommunications Conference between Malaysia and Brunei, held on 15 July, where matters concerning the telecommunications departments of both countries were discussed.

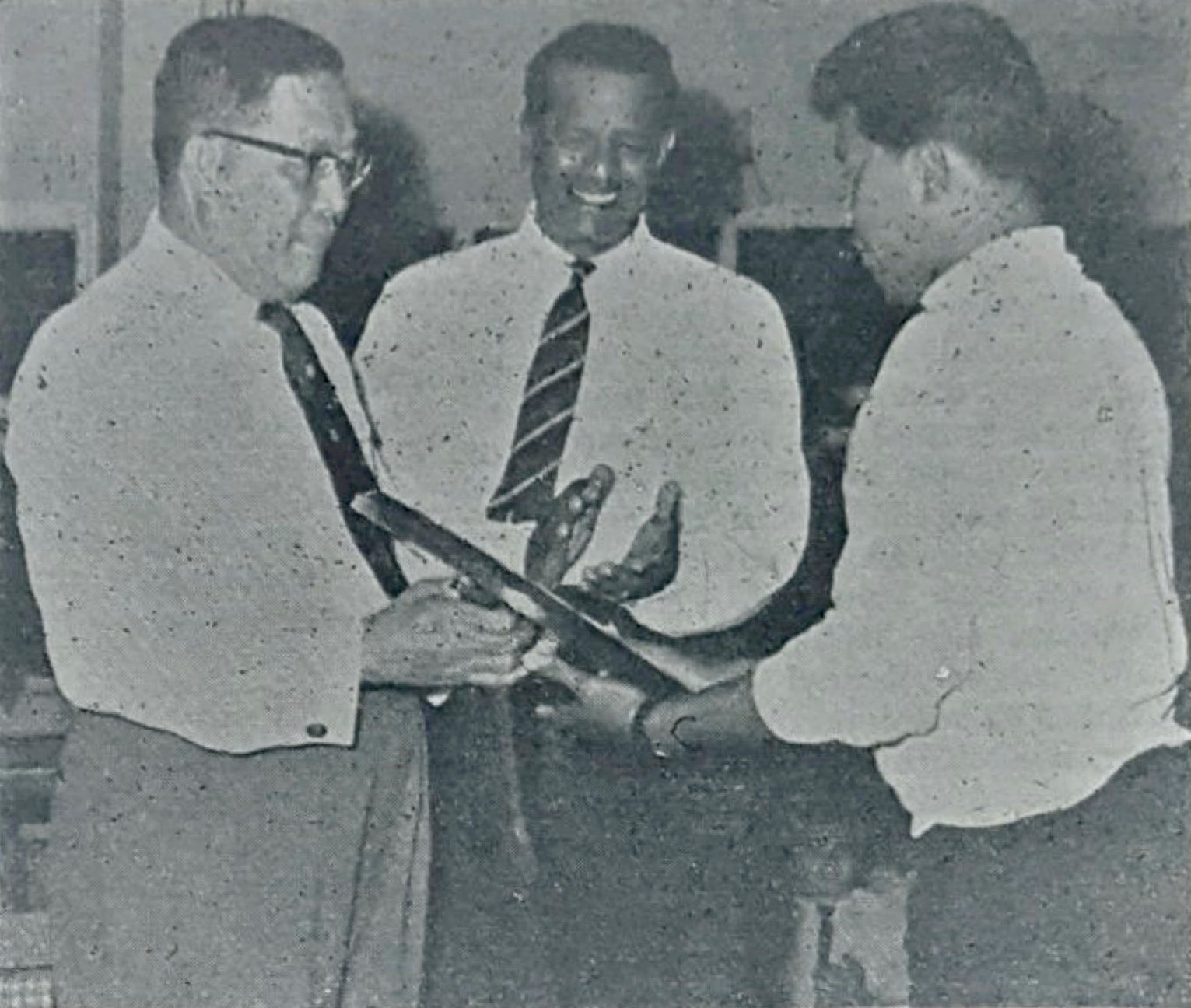
Pengiran Mohammad (left) presenting the Gibson Shield to a representative of the Brunei boxing team in 1966

In June 1966, Pengiran Mohammad urged former revolt detainees to pledge their loyalty and cooperation to the sultan and the Brunei government, delivering this message to 19 former detainees from Berakas Detention Camp who had completed a two-month rehabilitation course at the Bunut Rehabilitation Centre. Later that year, on 3 December, he announced the completion of Brunei's first HF radio telephone station in Melilas, with plans for more stations across the country. In the same year, Pengiran Mohammad retired from his job in telecommunications.

On 16 April 1967, he travelled to Kuala Lumpur with Pengiran Muda Hashim to represent the sultan and the Brunei government at the funeral of Tuanku Munawir, the Yang di-Pertuan Besar of Negeri Sembilan. Later, on 19 August, he was appointed by the sultan as a personal representative to greet and bid farewell to Singaporean Prime Minister Lee Kuan Yew during his visit to Brunei for the royal wedding of Princess Nor'ain and Pengiran Anak Mohammad Yusof.

On 2 April 1969, Pengiran Mohammad and Pengiran Abdul Momin joined Prince Mohamed Bolkiah on a visit to Kuala Balai. Later, on 1 May, they accompanied the prince again during a tour of the Seria oil field, visiting Brunei Shell's headquarters and various oil exploration platforms. Additionally, Pengiran Mohammad was present when Pengiran Anak Abdul Aziz left for the three-day wedding ceremonies following the royal marriage of Princess Masna and Pengiran Anak Abdul Aziz on 6 November.

In early July 1970, Pengiran Mohammad accompanied the royal wedding of Prince Mohamed Bolkiah, held at Omar Ali Saifuddien Mosque in Brunei Town, where the marriage was officiated by Zain Serudin. He joined the groom and the procession of royal regalia during the ceremony. Later, on 17 December 1971, Pengiran Mohammad officiated the 22nd Brunei Malay Teachers Association Congress, emphasising the association's vital role in safeguarding the nation's sovereignty and the importance of instilling national values such as the sultanate, religion, and culture in future generations. In 1976, he oversaw the passing-out parade of the 37th Recruit Intake of the Royal Brunei Malay Regiment at Bolkiah Camp.

== Death and funeral ==
On 25 May 1976, Pengiran Mohammad died at the age of 71, at the Brunei General Hospital, and was given a full honorary state funeral.

The state funeral was attended by His Majesty Sultan Hassanal Bolkiah, Sultan Omar Ali Saifuddien III, the British High Commissioner, and members of the nobility including the Wazir-Wazir, Cheteria-Cheteria, and the Pehin-Pehin Manteri.

He was laid to rest at the Royal Mausoleum in Bandar Seri Begawan.

== Personal life ==
Pengiran Mohammad married Raden Mas Dino (Siti Maznah), who is the daughter of Inche Awang Abdullah @ Raden Mas Abdullah. Together, they had five children, including Pengiran Haji Yunus, Pengiran Haji Mohd. Yaakub, Pengiran Haji Yunsi, Pengiran Dato Paduka Haji Idris, (Note: He would become the first ambassador of Brunei to the United States.) and Pengiran Haji Raden Hanafi. After Raden Mas Dino's death, he married her younger sister, Datin Paduka (Raden Mas) Siti Raudzahtun Nadzrah, with whom he had three children: Pengiran Rohana, Pengiran Che' Din, and Pengiran Ibrahim.

Pengiran Mohammad, a keen admirer of Western fashion and modernity, often sported the latest outfits from London catalogues and drove a Vauxhall. To stay well-informed, he subscribed to newspapers and magazines from London and the United States. An enthusiastic golfer, he played on a course carved from the jungle, achieving a handicap of 8. His curiosity for aviation likely made him the first Brunei Malay of his time to fly in an airplane. Always open to new experiences, he eagerly embraced new cars, fashions, and trends. Additionally, he was well-known for his strong support of various charitable and sporting organisations, with a particular passion for football, earning the title "Football Star of His Time." He was also a dedicated supporter of boxing in Brunei, contributing significantly to the development of both sports. His unwavering commitment to football and boxing has left a lasting impact on these sports in the country.

Pengiran Mohammad's early residence was in Kampong Padang, Brunei Town.

== Titles, styles and honours ==
=== Titles and styles ===
Personal standard of Pengiran Temenggong Sahibul Bahar

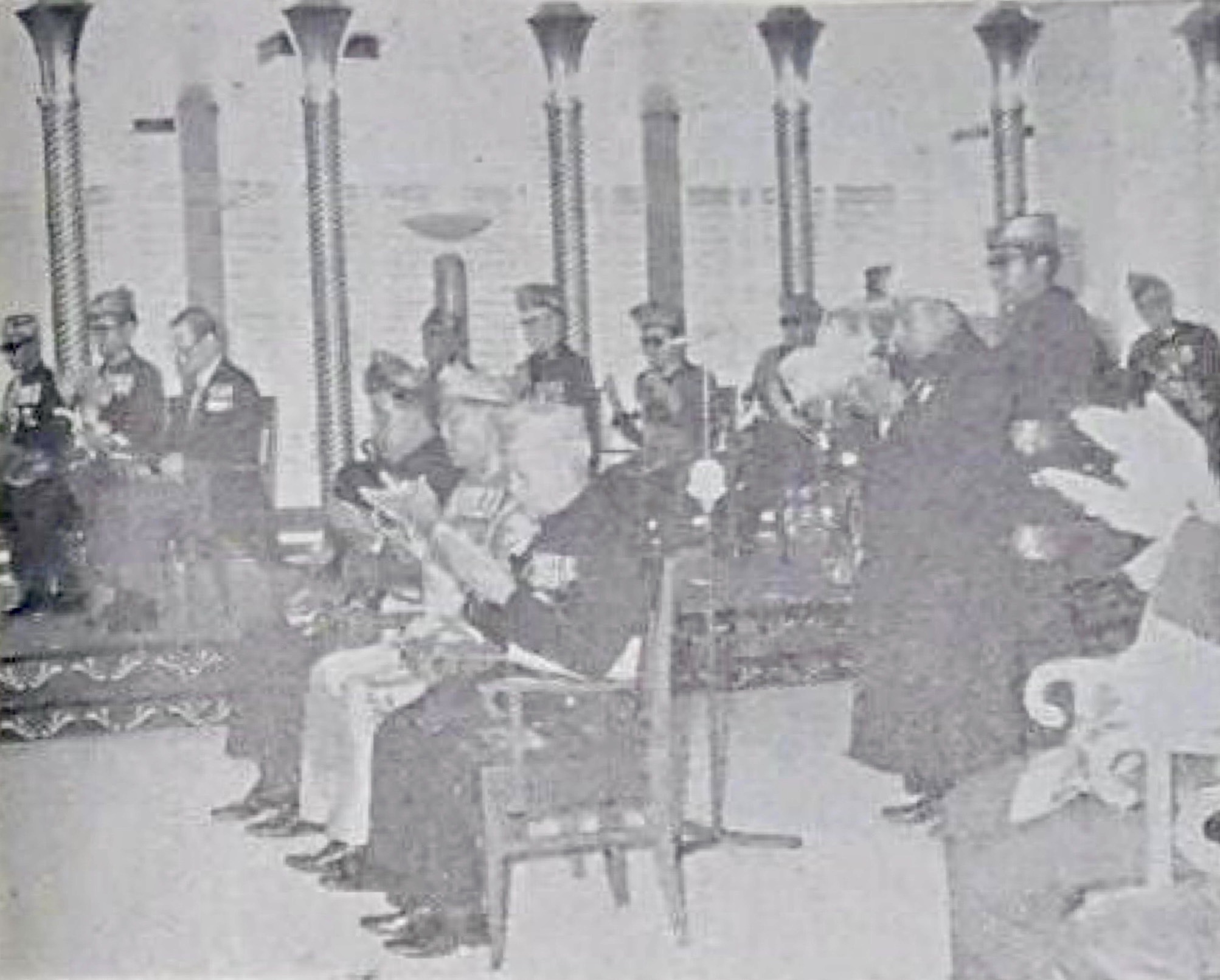
Pengiran Mohammad (seated second from the left) at the title bestowment ceremony held at the Lapau in 1971

In 1950, Pengiran Mohammad was honoured by Sultan Omar Ali Saifuddien III with the cheteria title of Pengiran Kerma Indera. He was later elevated to the title of Pengiran Shahbandar Sahibul Bandar in 1969. Each of these titles carries the style Yang Amat Mulia. His final promotion came in the form of the wazir title Pengiran Temenggong Sahibul Bahar, (Note: After his death, the title was shortened to "Pengiran Temenggong." In English, the title translates to "Lord of the Sea." Pengiran Temenggong held the highest authority in matters of naval military affairs, overseeing the administration of newly allocated territories, and serving as the highest official in communications and information management. Additionally, he was the chief authority in adjudicating matters related to those sentenced.) which was conferred at the Lapau on 20 October 1971, and styled as Yang Teramat Mulia Seri Paduka. (Note: His full title is "Yang Teramat Mulia Duli Paduka Pengiran Temenggong Sahibul Bahar Pengiran Haji Mohammad Pengiran Abdul Rahman Piut.")

=== Honours ===
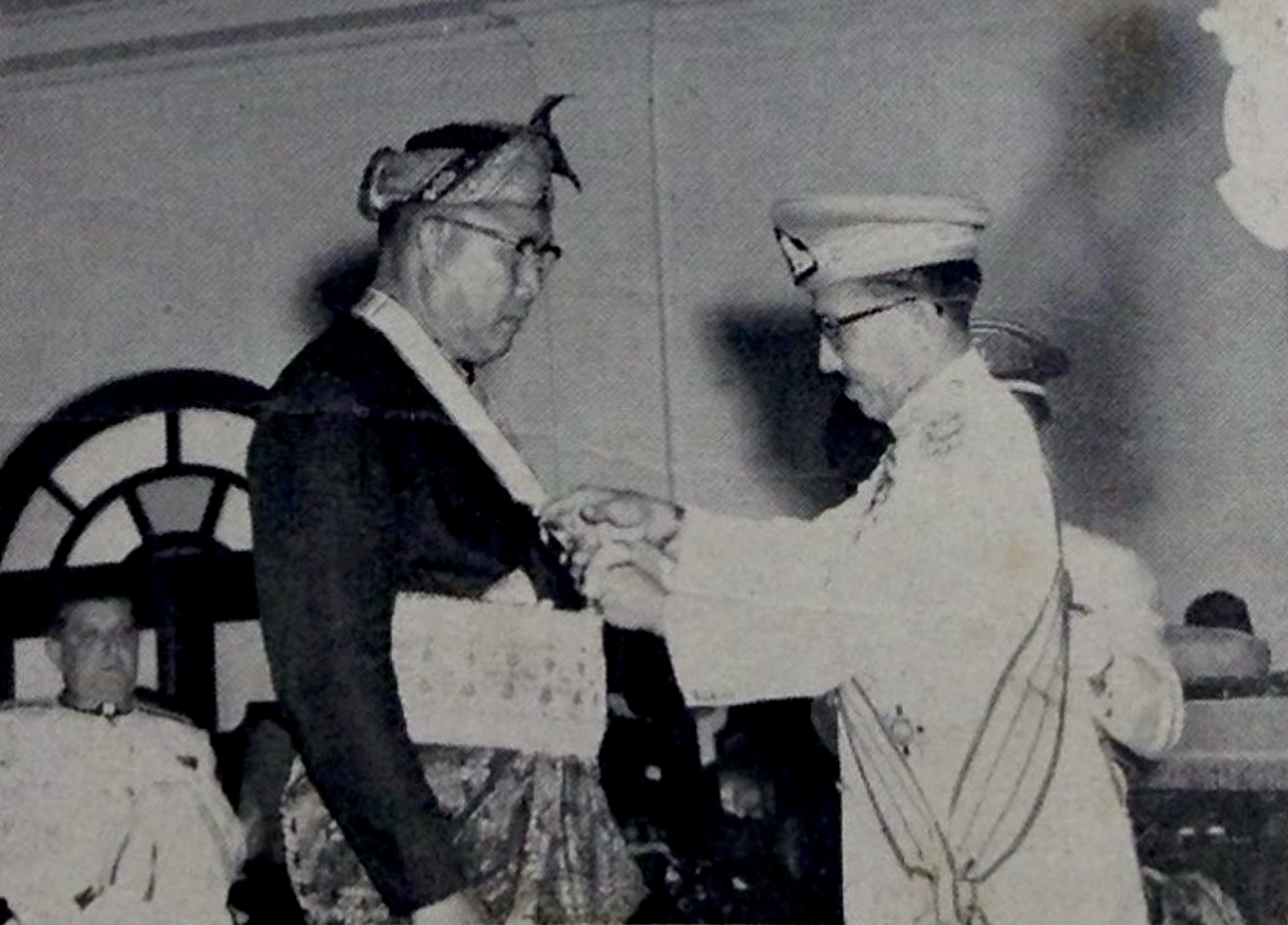
Pengiran Mohammad being awarded the DPMB by Sultan Omar Ali Saifuddien III in 1960

Pengiran Mohammad has been bestowed the following honours:

National

- Family Order of Laila Utama (DK; 1968) – Dato Laila Utama
- Order of Seri Paduka Mahkota Brunei First Class (SPMB) – Dato Seri Paduka
- Order of Seri Paduka Mahkota Brunei Second Class (DPMB; 24 November 1960) – Dato Paduka
- Order of Setia Negara Brunei Second Class (DSNB; 21 December 1963) – Dato Setia
- Order of Perwira Agong Negara Brunei First Class (PANB; 2 October 1963)
- Order of Pahlawan Negara Brunei Third Class (PNB)
- Sultan Hassanal Bolkiah Medal (PHBS)
- Omar Ali Saifuddin Medal First Class (POAS; 23 September 1958)
- Meritorious Service Medal (PJK; 23 September 1961)
- Omar Ali Saifuddin Coronation Medal (31 May 1951)
- Campaign Medal (22 April 1965)

Foreign

- United Kingdom:
  - Member of the Order of the British Empire (MBE; 1954)

== Notes ==
Regnal titles
Preceded by Prince Mohamed Bolkiah	Pengiran Temenggong Sahibul Bahar; 1971–1976	Vacant
