= Abdullah Hanafi =

Bruneian administrator (born 1880s)

Pehin Orang Kaya Udana Laila Dato Setia Abdullah Hanafi DSNB POAS MBE
- عبد الله بن حنفي
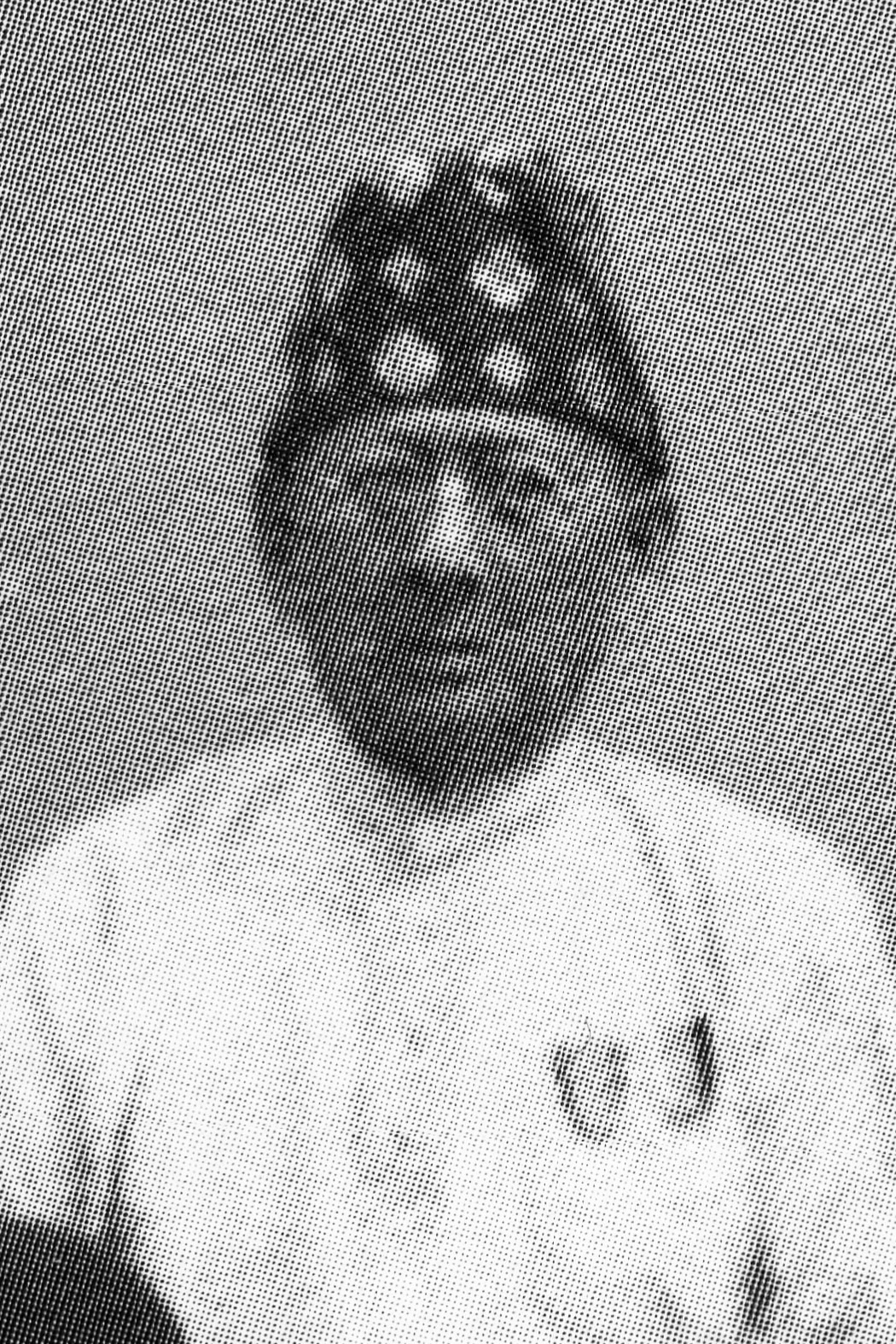
- Abdullah in 1951
- Born: 1880s Crown Colony of Labuan
- Occupations: Administrator; religious judge
- Known for: Founder of Dikir Syarafil Anam and a member of the State Council from 1938 to 1939
- Relatives: Pengiran Mohammed (son-in-law)

Abdullah bin Hanafi (Note: His full name was Pehin Orang Kaya Udana Laila Dato Setia Inche Awang Abdullah @ Raden Mas Abdullah Bin Raden Mas Haji Hanafi.) (born 1880s), commonly known as Inche Awang, was an aristocrat and administrator who played a crucial role in shaping the region during the early to mid-20th century. Serving as both the district officer and district kadhi of Tutong from 1927 to 1945, he was a key figure in driving the region's social and infrastructure development. His leadership was crucial during a time when the district needed strong guidance, and his contributions left a lasting impact on the community. The generations who lived under his tenure recalled his efforts to modernise and guide the district through significant growth.

== Early life ==
Abdullah bin Raden Mas Haji Hanafi was born in the Crown Colony of Labuan sometime in the 1880s (Note: Although there is no information about his exact birthdate, this is based on the marriage date of his father, Raden Mas Haji Hanafi, to Siti Saleha (Inang Liah) binti Abu Bakar, which took place on 26 July 1877. Prior to this, Siti Saleha had been married to Bujang bin Ahmad bin Sulaiman, with whom she had children.) and came from a wealthy family in Samarang, Dutch East Indies. A devout and hardworking man, his father, Raden Mas Haji Hanafi, immigrated to Brunei in 1871 and worked as a goldsmith. Abdullah was able to contribute to the nation because he inherited his father's knowledge and work ethic. It should come as no surprise that he served in a variety of capacities over his lifetime, gaining the confidence of British authorities in charge of North Borneo and Brunei at the time.

== Career ==
Abdullah's career began in 1890 as a cattle butcher in Labuan. From 1891 to 1894, he pursued religious studies in Sambas, West Kalimantan, before returning to Labuan, where he taught the Qur'an to children. In 1895, he shifted his career to become a sailor, travelling extensively across East Kalimantan, the Zamboanga Islands, Serangkani, Cotabato, Davao, Cebu, Pilu-Pilu, Basilan, Kinti, Madura, Kudat, Sandakan, Lahad Datu, and Tawau. That same year, he was appointed captain of the ship Fookseng, sailing to the Philippine Islands, Celebes, and Sandakan. In 1897, he navigated the ship to British Hong Kong for the first time as the shipowner's wife was unwell there. A year later, he returned to Labuan.

In 1899, Abdullah worked under J. P. Kaesberry in Labuan, learning to draw maps of houses and other structures. Motivated by a strong desire for self-improvement, he embarked on another journey around Borneo between 1901 and 1904. During this period, Kaesberry entrusted him with organising the Api-Api settlement in Sabah to establish Jesselton town and relocating government offices from Gaya Island—destroyed during Mat Salleh Rebellion—to Kebago in Kuala Menggatal. Abdullah supervised the construction of a bridge in Api-Api District for large ships to dock, employing 50 labourers from Labuan and Brunei alongside 190 Dusun and Bajau workers from Sabah, who transported stones from Tanjong Liadan, Likas, Kuala Inanam, and Gaya Island. The bridge was completed within two years. Alongside his Ceylonese colleague, Inche Rodrigo, Abdullah served as a surveyor for the project, successfully planning Jesselton town with roads, shops, and warehouses, establishing it as a proper town.

After completing the Jesselton project, Abdullah moved to Tanjung Aru, where he established a 500 acres (200 ha) coconut plantation owned by Frederikh Hall, Clark, and Beneville, eventually becoming the plantation manager. In 1904, he was awarded a contract to build the governor's residence, the district officer's home, and two hospitals in Labuan. He was later appointed serang kapal (ship leader) of a Chinese ship called Lovely at the start of 1905. After relocating to Brunei in 1906, he established a plantation on Keingaran Island. However, during a smallpox outbreak in Brunei in December 1906, he returned to Labuan and, on 1 January 1907, was hired as an overseer and cartographer at the Labuan Public Works Department.

Beginning in 1908, Abdullah alternated work between Brunei and Labuan after negotiating with John Fortescue Owen, a British resident of Labuan, and Stoney, a British assistant resident of Brunei. In Brunei, his responsibilities included surveying land to plan the construction of offices, police stations, and other buildings. In Labuan, he was tasked with constructing a lighthouse on Papan Island in 1908 and another on Kuraman Island in Brunei Bay in 1909. The Brunei government later used his extensive expertise and knowledge, gained in Sabah and Labuan, for building water dams, highways, and urban planning. His reputation grew, and he became a prominent consultant.

On 1 January 1910, Abdullah officially joined the Brunei government as a senior surveyor and cartographer in the land department, leveraging his extensive prior work experience across Borneo. In 1912, he collaborated with a Chinese contractor from British Hong Kong to successfully construct the British Resident's house and office. Recognising his growing expertise, the Brunei government entrusted him with planning the state's development.

In 1917, a conflict arose between the government and the Kedayan community over land restrictions, leading to the tragic death of a Kedayan man, who was shot while asleep by an unidentified individual. British resident Geoffrey Cator tasked Abdullah with retrieving the victim's body from Batu II, Jalan Tutong. The next morning, Abdullah, accompanied by Cator, Chief Police Officer McAffee, 17 Sikh policemen, and two Malays, Lance Corporal Daud and Sergeant Kadir, proceeded to the location. Upon reaching Sengkurong Bridge, they were confronted by approximately 1,000 armed Kedayan. The situation grew tense, but recognising Abdullah for his past contributions, the Kedayan leaders allowed him to speak. He seized the opportunity to urge them to lay down their weapons to avoid further bloodshed. His diplomatic efforts successfully defused the conflict, restoring peace and order.

The following year, in 1918, another act of resistance by the Kedayan community emerged in Kampong Pengkalan Gadong, led by Orang Kaya Dollah, who claimed authority over the area. He opposed government land surveys and threatened violence against those conducting them. To address the situation, a meeting was convened involving Cator, Inche Awang, in his capacity as settlement officer, and McAffee. A special operation was subsequently planned to resolve the issue.

On 14 April 1918, McAffee and Abdullah set out from Brunei Town for Orang Kaya Dollah's residence. Upon arrival, Abdullah insisted on entering the house alone. However, Orang Kaya Dollah fled through the back door as soon as Abdullah entered. Police guarded the house for two weeks, during which time Abdullah engaged with Orang Kaya Dollah and persuaded him to surrender to Sultan Muhammad Jamalul Alam II. By early June 1918, Orang Kaya Dollah voluntarily presented himself at the palace, where he surrendered to the sultan. He was subsequently arrested by the police and exiled to Labuan the following day.

Abdullah's ability and expertise in addressing national issues earned him a permanent appointment with the Brunei government. On 10 January 1922, he was appointed chief foreman at the Public Works Department in Brunei Town, where he was tasked with constructing a road linking Brunei Town to Tutong Town from 1923 to 1926. In 1926, he established the boundaries of Kampong Keriam, renaming its river and hill from Sungai Rium and Bukit Rium to Sungai Keriam and Bukit Keriam. That year, he also built a water pipeline from Wasai Beguruh in Mukim Kianggeh to supply water to Brunei Town.

His most notable career milestone came as the district officer of Tutong from 1927 to 1935. Assuming the role on 1 January 1927, he was also appointed a district judge. Early in his tenure, he captured two murderers involved in an incident in Kampong Tanjong Maya, where Abdul Rashid bin Salleh and another killed three Chinese individuals and injured two others on 23 January 1927. Despite opposition from Penghulu Abdul Rashid, the arrests proceeded, and the penghulu was later pacified with a police belt signifying his authority to arrest offenders. Abdullah received a commendation for capturing the murderers within two hours.

Between 1932 and 1933, he oversaw the construction of a coastal road connecting Tutong Town to Kuala Belait, along with bridges over Sungai Liang, Lumut, Sungai Bera, Anduki, and Andua. He also surveyed sites for government buildings and shop lots in Kuala Belait, planning road layouts for the town. In 1935, he renamed Petani Malay School to Bukit Bendera Tutong Malay School, and in 1936, he supervised the construction of Jalan Raya Kuala Abang, named after a tree abundant in the area whose fruit could be processed into oil.

== Later life and death ==
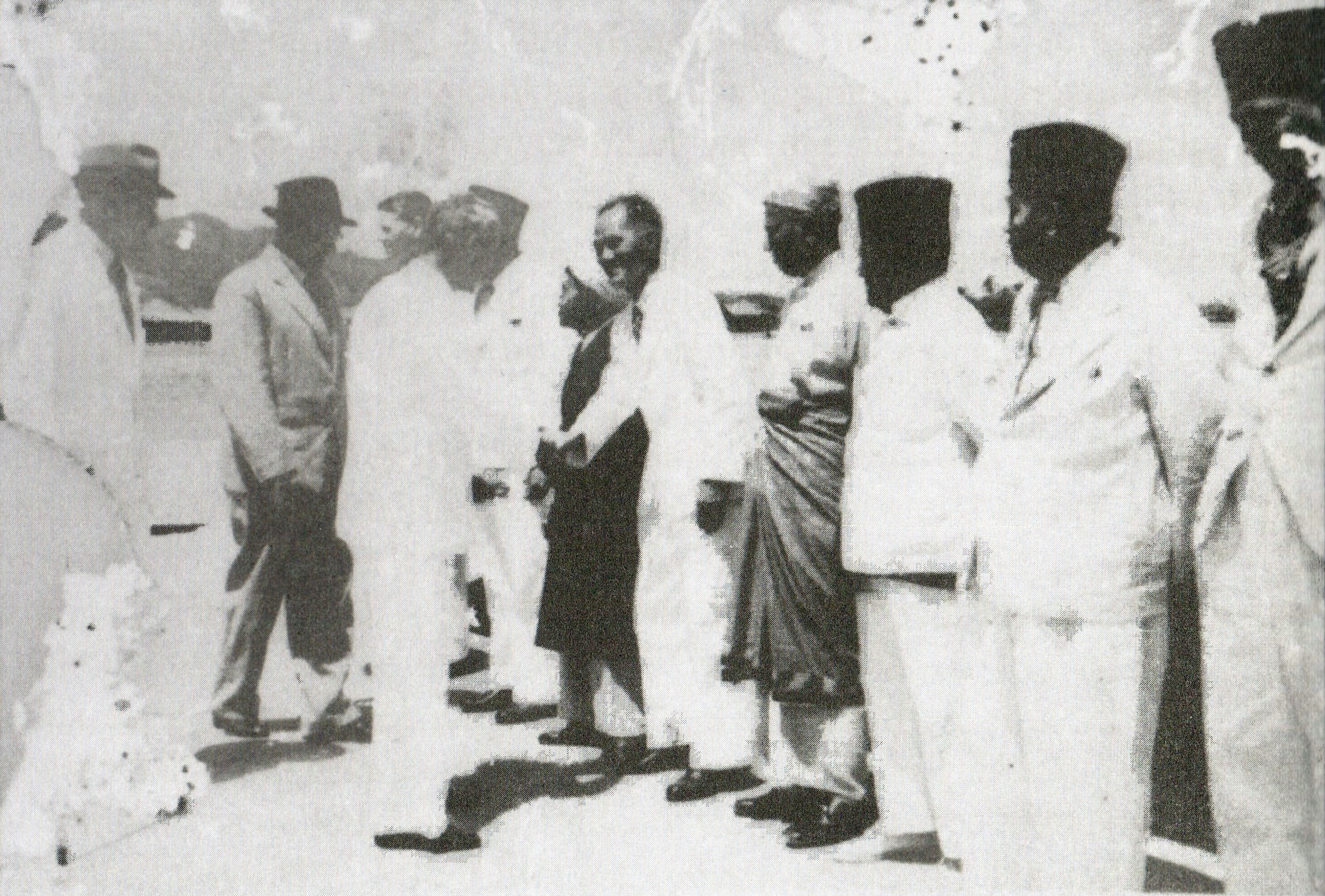
Abdullah welcoming Malcolm MacDonald to Brunei in 1950

On 31 December 1935, Abdullah retired from government service and was subsequently appointed a member of the State Council from 1938 to 1939, (Note: B. A. Hussainmiya put the date on 28 October 1940 and 28 April 1942.) carrying the title Yang Berhormat (The Honourable), before serving as the deputy kadhi for the Tutong District from 1939 to 1940. His dedication to public service continued when he was temporarily appointed district officer of Tutong on 28 January 1945 to restore order in the district, which was plagued by theft and unrest. The following day, he resigned as deputy kadhi, a position then assumed by Pengiran Haji Abdul Rahman bin Pengiran Maharaja Lela of Kampong Kandang, Tutong. After successfully restoring peace, Abdullah stepped down as district officer on 1 January 1946 and was succeeded by Pengiran Jaya Negara Pengiran Haji Abu Bakar.

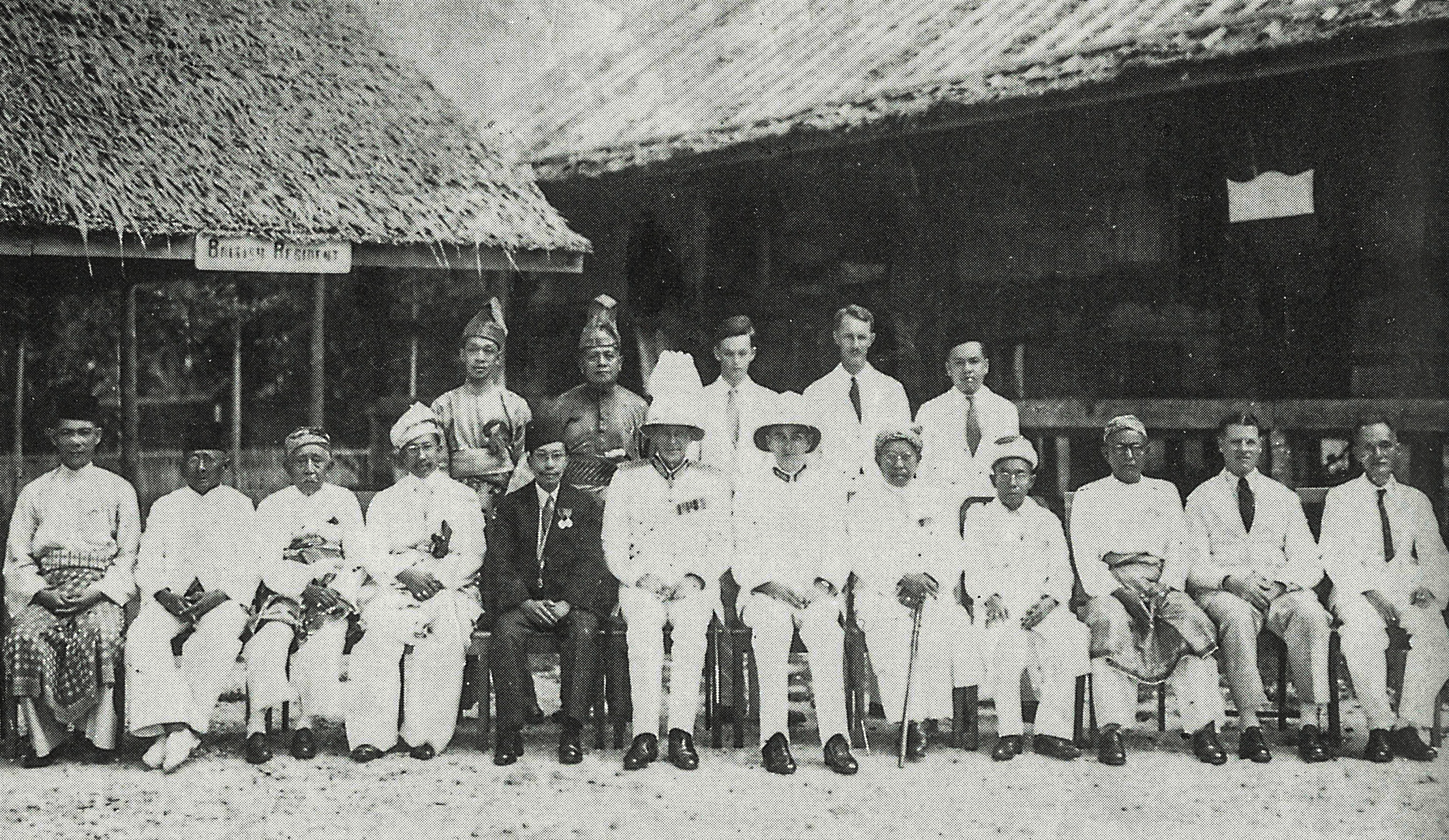
Abdullah (seated second from the left) outside the British Resident's office at Resident Peel's farewell, 17 January 1948

Abdullah's contributions extended beyond administration into religion and the arts, showcasing his versatility and skill. He was a teacher of dikir, silat, and kuntau, and a designer and maker of royal palanquins. He founded the Dikir Syarafil Anam in Brunei, (Note: Dikir Syarafil Anam is a custom from Brunei that honours Prophet Muhammad and celebrates his life and virtues. It entails reciting salam and selawat while focusing on proper vocal technique, melody, and pronunciation. This religious and cultural custom is frequently carried out during occasions such as Maulud Nabi Muhammad.) initially known as Dikir Inche Awang, and trained notable students such as Pehin Datu Panglima Haji Abu Bakar bin Jambol, Dato Paduka Haji Abdul Wahab bin Muhammad, Haji Ghazali bin Umar, and Haji Tengah bin Abdul Ghafar, a distinguished dikir teacher from Kampong Burong Pingai. Despite being elderly and in poor health by 1961, Abdullah remained dedicated and actively participated in discussions for the installation of Prince Hassanal Bolkiah as crown prince.

== Personal life ==
On 25 April 1904, Abdullah married Dayang Siti Aminah binti Burut, and together they were blessed with five children. Their first child, Raden Mas Ibrahim, was born in 1905 in Kampong Parit Labuan, while the others—Raden Mas Dino (Muznah) in 1906, Raden Mas Emran in 1913, Raden Mas Siti Raudzahtun Nadzrah in 1914, and Raden Mas Siti Salmah Zahrah in 1916—were born in Kampong Padang Tutong.

Raden Mas Dino (Muznah) married Pengiran Temenggong Pengiran Haji Mohammad bin Pengiran Abdul Rahman Piut, and they had five children: Pengiran Haji Yunus, Pengiran Haji Mohd. Yaakub, Pengiran Haji Yunsi, Pengiran Dato Paduka Haji Idris, and Pengiran Haji Raden Hanafi. After Raden Mas Dino's passing, Pengiran Temenggong Pengiran Haji Mohammad married her sister, Datin Paduka Siti Raudzahtun Nadzrah, and they had three children: Pengiran Hajah Rohana, Pengiran Che' Din, and Pengiran Ibrahim.

In 1940, Abdullah remarried Halimah binti Abdul Rahim, and they had three children: Raden Mas Ismail, Raden Mas Hajah Khairani, and Raden Mas Mohd. Basiuni.

== Titles, styles and honours ==
=== Titles and styles ===
In 1941, Sultan Ahmad Tajuddin honoured him with the title of Pehin Orang Kaya Udana Laila. A few years later, in 1950, he was appointed Datu Penghulu by Sultan Ahmad Tajuddin, a prestigious role in which he oversaw all penghulus and Village heads.

=== Honours ===
In the 1952 New Year Honours, Queen Elizabeth II awarded him the MBE. Additionally, he was honoured with the DSNB and became a member of the Royal Succession Council.

National

- Order of Setia Negara Brunei Second Class (DSNB) – Dato Setia
- Omar Ali Saifuddin Medal (POAS)
- Omar Ali Saifuddin Coronation Medal (31 May 1951)

Foreign

- United Kingdom:
  - Member of the Order of the British Empire (MBE; 1952)

=== Things named after him ===
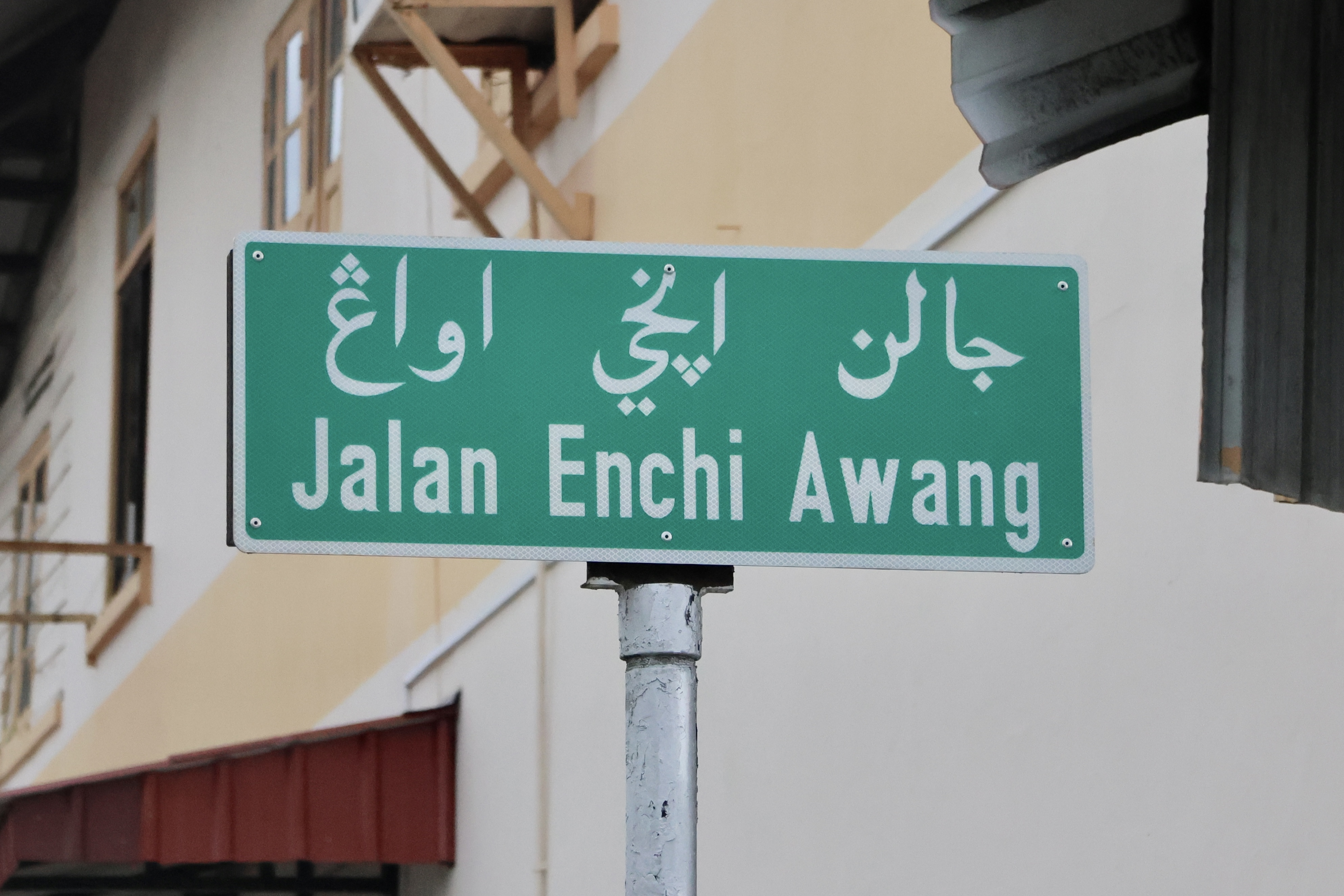
Jalan Enchi Awang in 2024

- Jalan Enchi Awang, a road in Tutong town has been named after him.
