= BMB Group =

Advisory and asset management platform

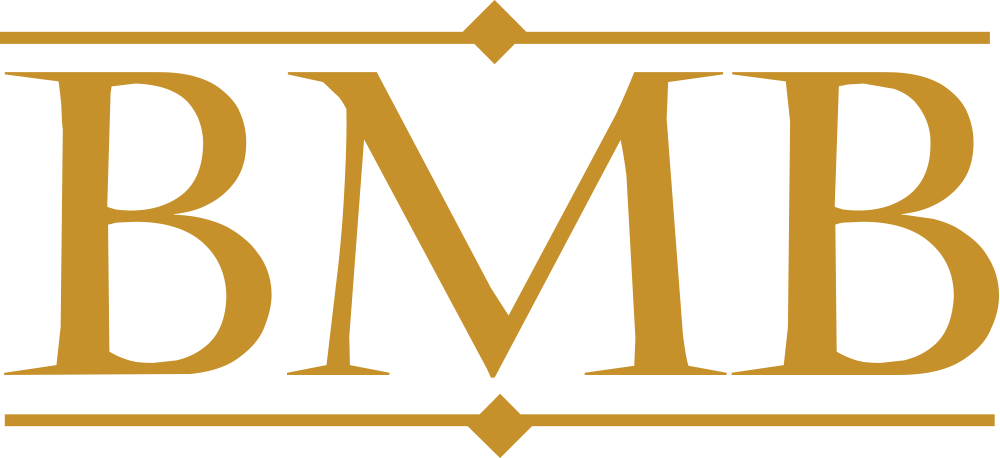
- Type: Private
- Industry: Financial services
- Founded: 2006; 20 years ago
- Founder: Withanage; Pengiran Anak Abdul 'Ali Yil-Kabier
- Headquarters: Hamilton, Bermuda
- Key people: Rizmi Niyas (executive director)
- Services: Advisory; asset management
- Subsidiaries: EMP Global; BMB Islamic; Scepter Capital
- Website: thebmbgroup.com

The BMB Group is an advisory and asset management platform for ruling families and Forbes 500 investors. The company refocused its operations in 2015 to offer financing and expert guidance to Forbes 500 families alone. The firm exclusively collaborates on private off-market ventures with extremely wealthy investors. Many of the eastern governing families who built up massive fortunes from the continuous increase in interest in commodities are among its increasing number of investors.

== Structure ==
The BMB Group serves as a link for high-end investments between East Asia and the Middle East. The company and its affiliates have invested upwards of US$12 billion around the world in the areas of private equity, real estate, natural resources, wealth management, hospitality and philanthropy. BMB has representative offices in London and Monaco in addition to its headquarters in the corporate tax haven of Bermuda.

Based in Brunei, Withanage likes to compare BMB to an unlimited partnership private bank in the Swiss model. Put differently, while investing customers' money, senior management and stakeholders at BMB frequently endanger their own cash. According to Withanage, the opposite of BMB's strategy would be to concentrate on generating short-term profits by multiplying transactions through millions of clients and thousands of staff. It offers specialised guidance in the form of strategic consultancy services and company development, concentrating on emerging markets in the Middle East, Asia and Latin America.

== History ==
Founders of BMB

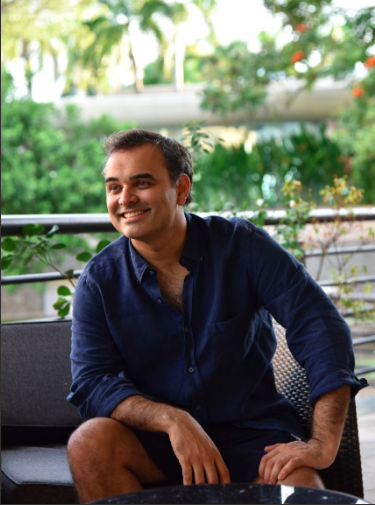
Withanage

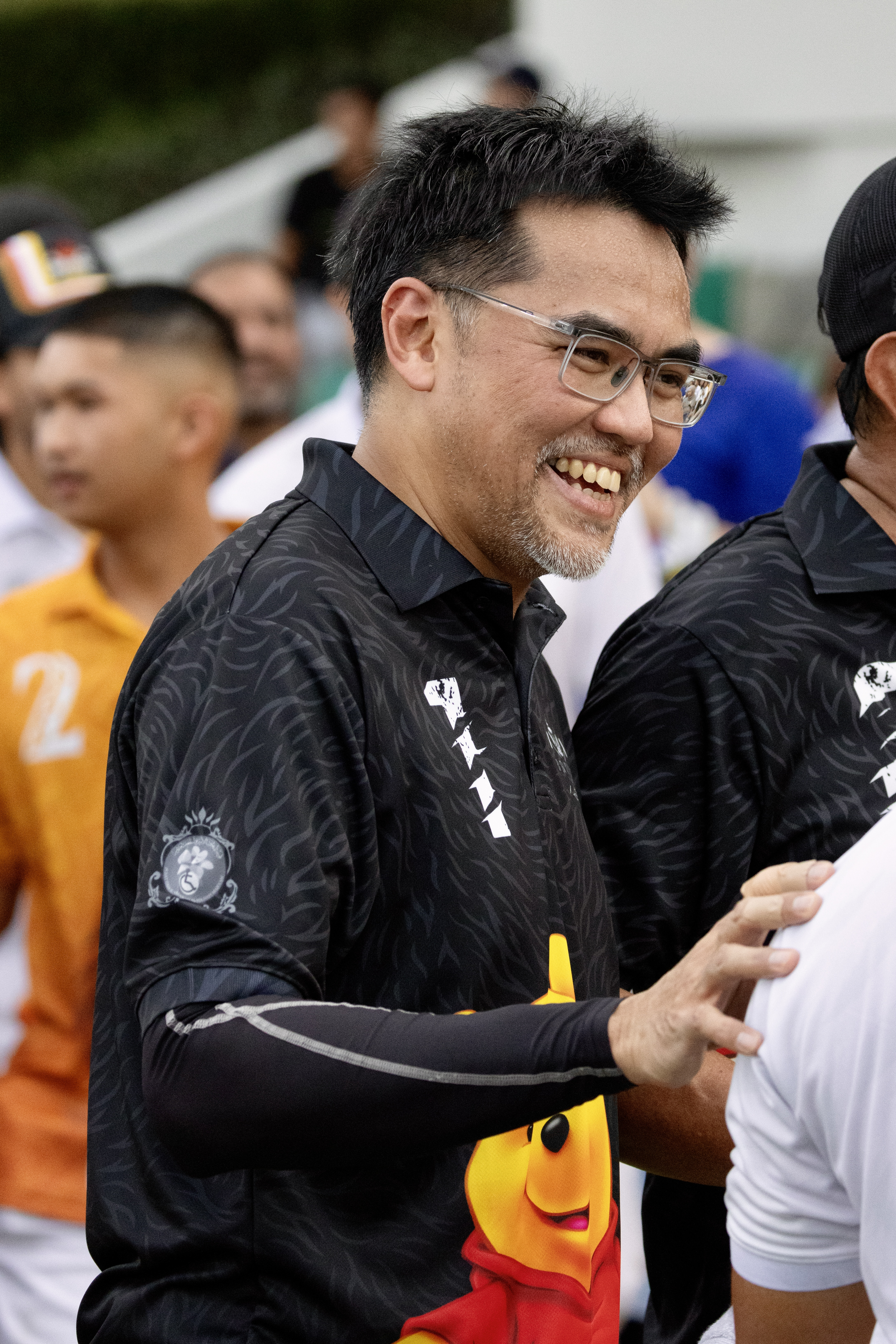
Pengiran Anak Abdul 'Ali Yil-Kabier

Withanage began work in 2004 while he was in his mid-20s. In fact, Pengiran Anak Abdul 'Ali Yil-Kabier (referred to as Abdul Ali), a descendant of the Bruneian royal family, co-founded it and serves as its co-chair. "I played on a polo team with Prince Abdul Ali," Withanage recalls while discussing the origins of the BMB concept. It resulted in a small, newly established business that was exceptionally well-connected and youthful, much like its top management. Prince Abdul Ali continues to serve as co-chairman and helped. In an interview, Withanage said he never had a business relationship with Prince Jefri Bolkiah and that he still has a great respect and connection with the Bruneian royal family, even if he no longer represents them. The BMB Group was officially established in 2006 by members of governing families in Asia and the Gulf.

On 29 June 2006, the Ministry of Finance (MoF) said that it had not granted any licenses for any fund associated with BMB Capital or any bank with that name. Referring to news articles that appeared in the Borneo Bulletin on Tuesday, 27 June 2006, and Wednesday, 28 June 2006, the MoF wishes to clarify that the Ministry has not granted any licenses in relation to funds associated with BMB Capital, according to a press release sent to the publication.

The parent firm of BMB Capital Management provided clarification on the news reports about its Syariah funds through an authorised spokesman in a separate press release to the Borneo Bulletin. According to the spokesperson, BMB Capital is a limited liability partnership (LLP) incorporated in the Cayman Islands, and its general partner is BMB Capital Management, which is also registered there. The parent business said that all of the fund's current operations are being managed outside of Brunei. The parent company's representative informed the Bulletin that BMB is only registered as "BMB," despite the Middle East News Agency identifying BMB as Brunei Merchant Bank.

As of June 2009, BMB has refocused its operations to offer financing and specialised advice to Forbes 500 families alone. These include the transfer of leadership of BMB to Rahula Withanage, who would lead Scepter Partners alongside Anthony J. Steains and his previous Blackstone Asia Advisory Partners team, from former chairman and CEO Withanage.

BMB Group's position as investment manager for a philanthropic fund established in the spring of 2009 by the 56 member states of the Organisation of Islamic Cooperation (OIC) demonstrates the company's extensive and growing links at the top of eastern society. The group's capacity as the investment advisor for a fund formed by the OIC serves as a showcase. With a $3 billion fund, this program seeks to bring together affluent Islamic nations to aid underprivileged communities around the globe. Prince Abdul Ali and Withanage realised they could also invite supportive Middle Eastern royals to participate in the initiative and raised money from a variety of Asian royals. A site for Islamic-focused investment, particularly between Asia and the Middle East, gained traction.

A portion of Alliance Capital Group, a real estate company based in the Netherlands that oversees €3 billion ($3.67 billion) in properties across Europe, was purchased by BMB on 23 June 2010. The amount of the share that BMB was purchasing was not disclosed by the deal's executives, but the business claimed that $500 million was invested in Alliance Capital Group to establish the merged company, which would now be known as BMB Alliance.

As an investor in BMB, Withanage will continue to play a significant role in the company's development even if it is no longer a member of the management team as of 2 October 2015. Scepter has given BMB Group a $2 billion commitment to create and run business ventures that have the potential to significantly impact and change the lives of Forbes 500 families. Prince Abdul Ali stated that, "We hope that some of BMB's activities may generate investment opportunities for Scepter as a co-investor in the future." When significant obligations might be necessary, Scepter aims to have a positive working relationship with BMB." Withanage was succeeded as CEO of BMB by Rahula Withanage.

In 2017, BMB ceased revealing the extent of its advisory engagements at the request of its investors. BMB does not take in any money from other sources and exclusively publishes accounts for its investors. The intention was to highlight companies that have been founded to deal with some of the most urgent issues the world is now experiencing. Scepter will carry on as a family office while generating significant money and influence for its patrons. In order to take on the role of CEO of Philantech, which is now creating revolutionary venture philanthropy and sustainable development firms, Withanage officially left Scepter Partners and the BMB Group in 2018.

As of 13 April 2023, Rizmi Niyas is the CEO of BMB and Rahul Withanage is the CEO of Scepter.

== EMP Global ==
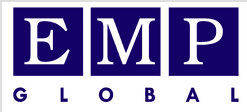
Logo of EMP Global

In December 2008 BMB invested to acquire a 50% interest in EMP Global which was a pioneer in emerging markets private equity. EMP was founded in 1992 by Former Prime Minister of Pakistan, Moeen Qureshi and former treasurer of the World Bank, Donald Roth. The partnership raised over USD7 Billion for private equity funds focused on Asia, South America, Middle East and emerging Europe. As part of the agreement, Qureshi would take on the role of vice chairman at BMB Group.

The EMP purchase has increased BMB's workforce from around 30 to roughly 100 employees. It will soon be disclosed that a group of well-known former government leaders from all across the world will serve as advisors. This was scheduled to take place in October 2009 in Brunei. Withanage was still committed to the notion of working with a select number of partners that their clients are familiar with and can rely on. He claims that because there was no punishment for bankers to line their own pockets, large businesses with a steady influx and outflow of bankers run the risk of becoming immoral and taking excessive risks with their clients' money.

== BMB Islamic ==
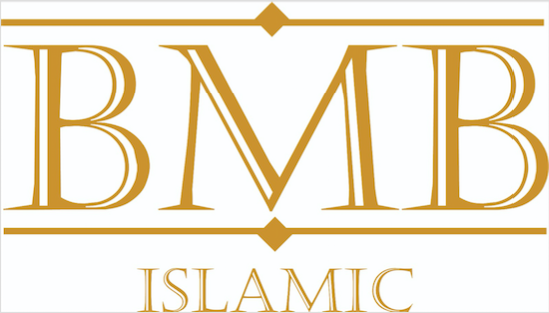
Logo of BMB Islamic

BMB acquired Deutsche Bank's subsidiary business in Islamic finance which advised on over $20 Billion in transactions.BMB Islamic was an early pioneer in Islamic finance. BMB advised the Malaysian Prime Minister, Abdullah Ahmad Badawi and the OIC on the setup of a global Zakat fund to manage Islamic philanthropic money.

BMB is constantly cautious to provide choices for both Islamic and non-Sharia-compliant investors because of its stakeholders and clientele. After all, Islam was developed in the Middle East, and while Bruneian royal family practices Islam, other BMB consumers do not. BMB Islamic, another branch of Withanage's organisation, was established in order to organise Islamic items and counsel establishments on how to use them or convert to Sharia compliance. As the division's president, Mirzan Mahathir, the oldest son of former Malaysian prime minister Mahathir Mohamad, was in charge of BMB Islamic.

The current form of BMB Islamic emerged in 2007 with the hiring of a group of specialists in Islamic finance who were in charge of several of Deutsche Bank's Islamic offerings. They departed from Dar Al Istithmar, a Deutsche Bank affiliate. As of June 2009, Humayon Dar, the previous managing director of Dar Al Istithmar, was the CEO of BMB Islamic.

BMB Islamic's experience includes working with SHUAA Capital in Dubai to establish an equity fund that complies with Shariah. Additionally, it assisted Australia's Macquarie Bank and Abu Dhabi's ADCB in establishing a Shariah-compliant exchange framework for an infrastructure fund, as well as National Bank of Dubai in creating a sukuk fund. Additionally, it sent a paper outlining its strategy for breaking into the Islamic sector to Commercial Bank of Dubai. BMB Islamic has expanded its assistance beyond non-Western establishments. A recent project it has been working on is an emerging fund from UK's F&C Asset Management for investments that adhere to Shariah and are advertised as generally socially good in order to appeal to non-Muslims.

== Scepter ==
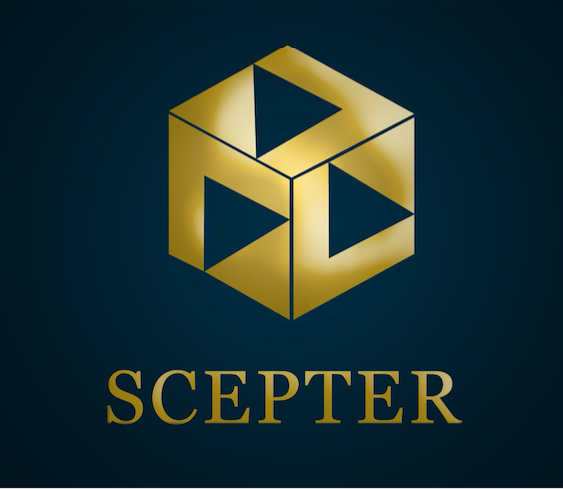
Logo of Scepter

In 2015 BMB invested in the creation of Scepter Partners, a standing syndicate of sovereign investors and ultra-high net worth families. Scepter was managed by veteran investment banker Anthony J. Steains and the former Blackstone Advisory Partners Asia team. The formation of Scepter's merchant banking division created one of the most experienced merchant banking specialists focused on family offices and sovereign wealth.

In 2015 Scepter bid $5.1 billion for the Australian oil and gas company Santos Limited. Scepter returned again in partnership with a consortium of investors led by Harbour Energy to offer $14.4 billion for Santos, but were unsuccessful. Scepter's directors include Prince Abdul Ali and Prince Bahar, two members of Bruneian royal family. The other directors are Juma bin Dalmook Al Maktoum, a well-known billionaire from the United Arab Emirates; Patrick N. Theros, a former US ambassador to Qatar; and Sir John Bond, the former chairman and chief executive of the HSBC Group.

== Reputation ==
In an investigative report, Euromoney described BMB as "one of the world's most exclusive financial institutions. The group calls to mind an era when courts of Asian empires were the global centers of money, technology, culture and power. Its growing number of investors are drawn from eastern ruling families with vast riches gleaned from the long term growth demand for commodities."
