= Global Islamic Finance Report =

Global Islamic Finance Report (GIFR) is an annual publication, covering recent developments in the global Islamic financial services industry. It was produced by Edbiz Consulting, a London-based Islamic advisory firm in conjunction with the Cambridge Institute of Islamic Finance.

Its first Editor was Professor Humayon Dar, it is the oldest yearbook in Islamic banking and finance. GIFR is also recognised for its pioneering work on the Islamic Finance Country Index (IFCI), which ranks about 50 countries of the world in terms of their involvement and leadership role in the Islamic financial services industry.

== History ==
The Global Islamic Finance Report was the first global publication of its kind.

Each annual edition of GIFR has a special theme. Following themes have so far been covered:

- GIFR 2010: Size and growth of the Islamic financial services industry
- GIFR 2011: Islamic financial regulation
- GIFR 2012: Islamic philanthropy and social responsibility
- GIFR 2013: Halal industry and Islamic finance
- GIFR 2014: Human resource development for Islamic banking and finance
- GIFR 2015: Leadership in Islamic Banking & Finance
- GIFR 2016: Islamic Financial Policy
- GIFR 2017: Leadership in Islamic Banking & Finance

The report was renamed as the Cambridge Global Islamic Finance Report in 2019 by the Cambridge Institute of Islamic Finance.

== Sponsors ==
GIFR is a publication that provides analyses provided by the top industry players, academicians and policy makers. Its different annual editions have been sponsored by major financial institutions like Dubai Islamic Bank, CIMB Islamic, Commerzbank, ITS, Hong Leong Islamic Bank, Abu Dhabi Commercial Bank, National Commercial Bank, and others.

GIFR 2014 was launched at the Global Donors Forum held at Washington, D.C., on April 13–16, 2014.

GIFR 2016 was launched at Global Islamic Finance Forum at Kuala Lumpur by Datuk Muhammad Ibrahim, Governor of Bank Negara Malaysia.
