= Pengiran Anak Hamidah Jamalul Bulqiah =

Bruneian nobility (born 1977)

Hamidah Jamalul Bulqiah حميدة جمال البلقية
- Born: 26 April 1977 (age 49); Bandar Seri Begawan, Brunei
- Spouse: Pengiran Anak Abdul 'Ali Yil-Kabier (m. 2005)
- Issue: Pengiran Anak Abdul Muta'ali Haziq Hamidullah; Pengiran Anak Adriana Haziqah Jaida Bulqiah; Pengiran Anak Alisha Husnara Jaida Bulqiah
Regnal name
- Pengiran Anak Hamidah Jamalul Bulqiah binti Duli Yang Teramat Mulia Paduka Seri Pengiran Digadong Sahibul Mal Pengiran Muda Haji Jefri Bolkiah
- House: Bolkiah
- Father: Prince Jefri Bolkiah
- Mother: Pengiran Anak Norhayati

Hamidah Jamalul Bulqiah binti Jefri Bolkiah (Note: Her name is also spelled differently as Pengiran Anak Hamidah Jamalul Bolqiah.) (born 26 April 1977) is a member of the royal family of Brunei as eldest daughter of Prince Jefri Bolkiah, fourth son of Sultan Omar Ali Saifuddien III.

== Personal life ==
Hamidah is born on 26 April 1977, Brunei (Note: On 26 April 2023, her brother, Prince Hakeem, wished her a happy birthday on his Instagram. Tina Turner also performed during her 19th birthday celebration in 1996, linking her birthday to 1977.) to Prince Jefri Bolkiah and his wife, Pengiran Anak Isteri Pengiran Norhayati. She has an elder brother and younger brother, Pengiran Muda Abdul Hakeem (born 13 June 1973) and Pengiran Muda Bahar (born 20 August 1981). (Note: At the time of her birth, Prince Jefri Bolkiah is only married to Pengiran Anak Norhayati since 1972.)

It was said that her father, Jefri, was surviving off borrowed money after his ten-year ordeal had finally come to an end. Jefri's former advisor, Thomas Derbyshire, claims that following Hamidah's second wedding, Prince Jefri and his children received a letter from the Brunei Investment Agency (BIA)'s attorneys that basically states, "All of your property in Brunei is being repossessed, and you have until June to vacate." They had around four weeks to prepare. Her father was furious at the eviction notice since it meant that Hamidah, who was "married to my sister's son, pregnant with a child," would also be forcibly removed from her house in addition to his two sons who were being removed from their palaces.

On 24 April 1995 and 25 April 1995 Whitney Houston performed private concerts on two consecutive nights at the Assaharah Melabau - Badminton Hall, Brunei, supported by Eternal to commemorate Hamidah's 18th birthday.

On 13 April 1996, Tina Turner performed a private concert in Brunei to commemorate Hamidah's 19th birthday, just before she embarked on her Wildest Dreams Tour. A home DVD and a supplementary 4-CD set were created just for her birthday party attendees, and they are extremely restricted. In honour of her, Janet Jackson gave a special performance on her 21st birthday at the Jerudong Park Amphitheater. Attendees also received an exclusive audio recording of the performance.

== Marriage and children ==
Hamidah married Pengiran Anak Abdul 'Ali Yil-Kabier, her first cousin and son of Princess Masna and Pengiran Anak Abdul Aziz, in Brunei on 17 April 2005. Her uncle, Sultan Hassanal Bolkiah and his family were present during the first wedding ceremony held at the groom's house at Kampong Telanai, along with other royal family members. Later, Queen Saleha gave her permission to be present at the bride's Jerudong home for the Bersanding ceremony. Then, in the ballroom of the sultan's hotel, the Grosvenor House Hotel in London, next to the Dorchester, her father threw her a second wedding.

Together, they have 3 children:

- Pengiran Anak Abdul Muta'ali Haziq Hamidullah
- Pengiran Anak Adriana Haziqah Jaida Bulqiah
- Pengiran Anak Alisha Husnara Jaida Bulqiah

== Honours ==
Honours awarded to her are as follows:

- Proclamation of Independence Medal (1 January 1984)
- Sultan of Brunei Silver Jubilee Medal (5 October 1992)
- Sultan of Brunei Golden Jubilee Medal (5 October 2017)
- National Day Silver Jubilee Medal (23 February 2009)
