= Pengiran Anak Abdul 'Ali Yil-Kabier =

Bruneian nobility and businessman (born 1976)

Abdul 'Ali Yil-Kabier عبد العلي الكبير
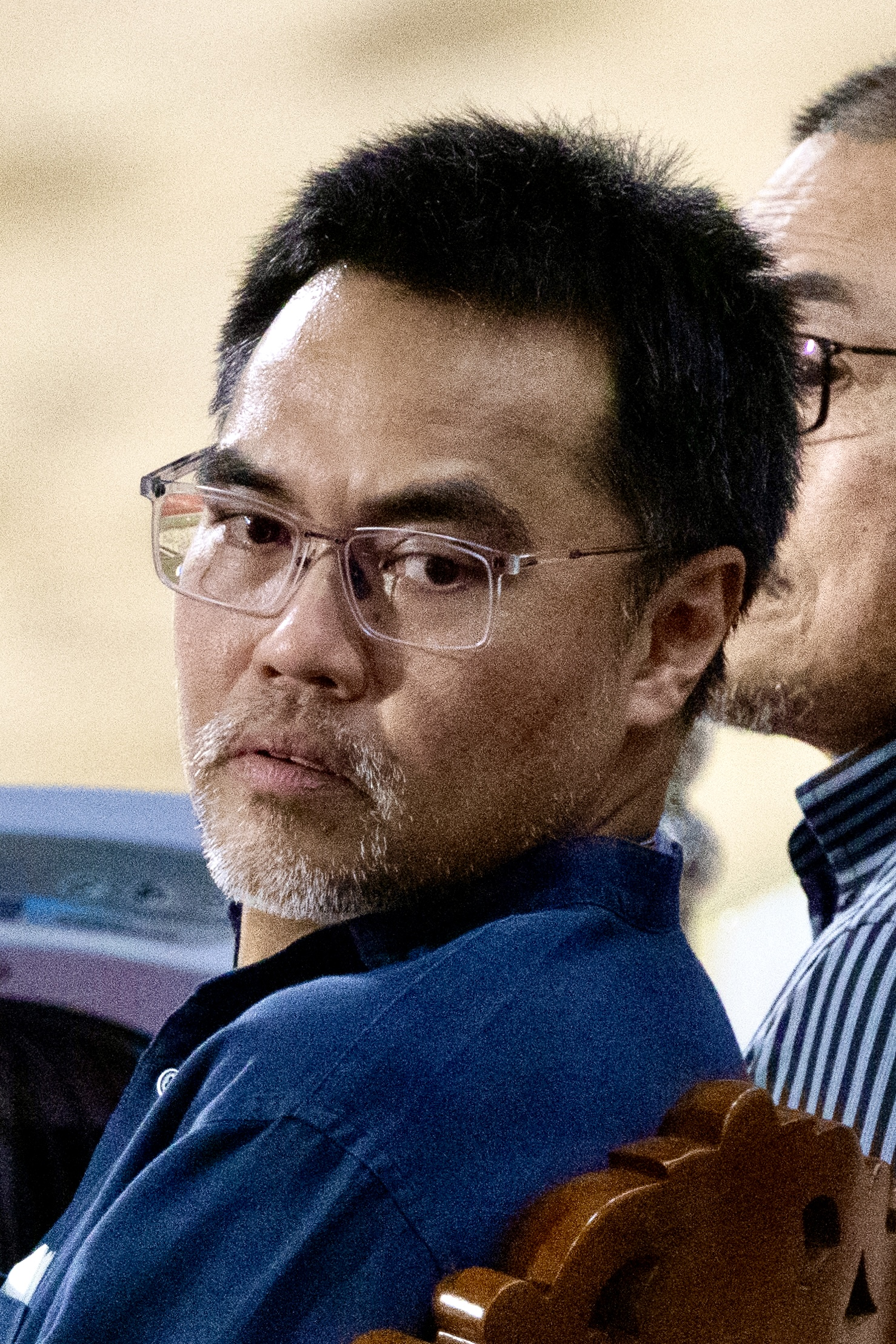
- Pengiran Anak Ali in 2024
- Born: February 9, 1976 (age 50)
- Spouse: Pengiran Anak Hamidah Jamalul Bulqiah (m. 2005)
- Issue: Abdul Muta'ali Haziq Hamidullah; Adriana Haziqah Jaida Bulqiah; Alisha Husnara Jaida Bulqiah
Regnal name
- Pengiran Anak Haji Abdul 'Ali Yil-Kabier bin Pengiran Lela Cheteria Sahibun Najabah Pengiran Anak Haji Abdul Aziz
- House: Bolkiah
- Father: Pengiran Anak Abdul Aziz
- Mother: Princess Masna
- Religion: Islam

Abdul 'Ali Yil-Kabier bin Abdul Aziz (born 9 February 1976) is a member of the royal family of Brunei as the son of Princess Masna, daughter of Sultan Omar Ali Saifuddien III. He is the husband of Pengiran Anak Hamidah Jamalul Bulqiah, daughter of Prince Jefri Bolkiah. He is the co-founder of BMB Group, an advisory and asset management company.

== Business career ==
The BMB Group is an investment firm established by Pengiran Anak Ali and Asian entrepreneur Rayo Withanage. The business is a multi-family office for governing families and extremely wealthy investors in the commercial sector. Its clientele includes ruling parties, sovereign wealth funds, and ultra-high net worth individuals. In addition to Withanage, the company's directors include Patrick Theros, Sir John Bond, Juma bin Dalmook Al Maktoum, Pengiran Anak Ali and Prince Bahar. He remained the chairman of the Board of Stakeholders as of 9 October 2015.

== Personal interest ==
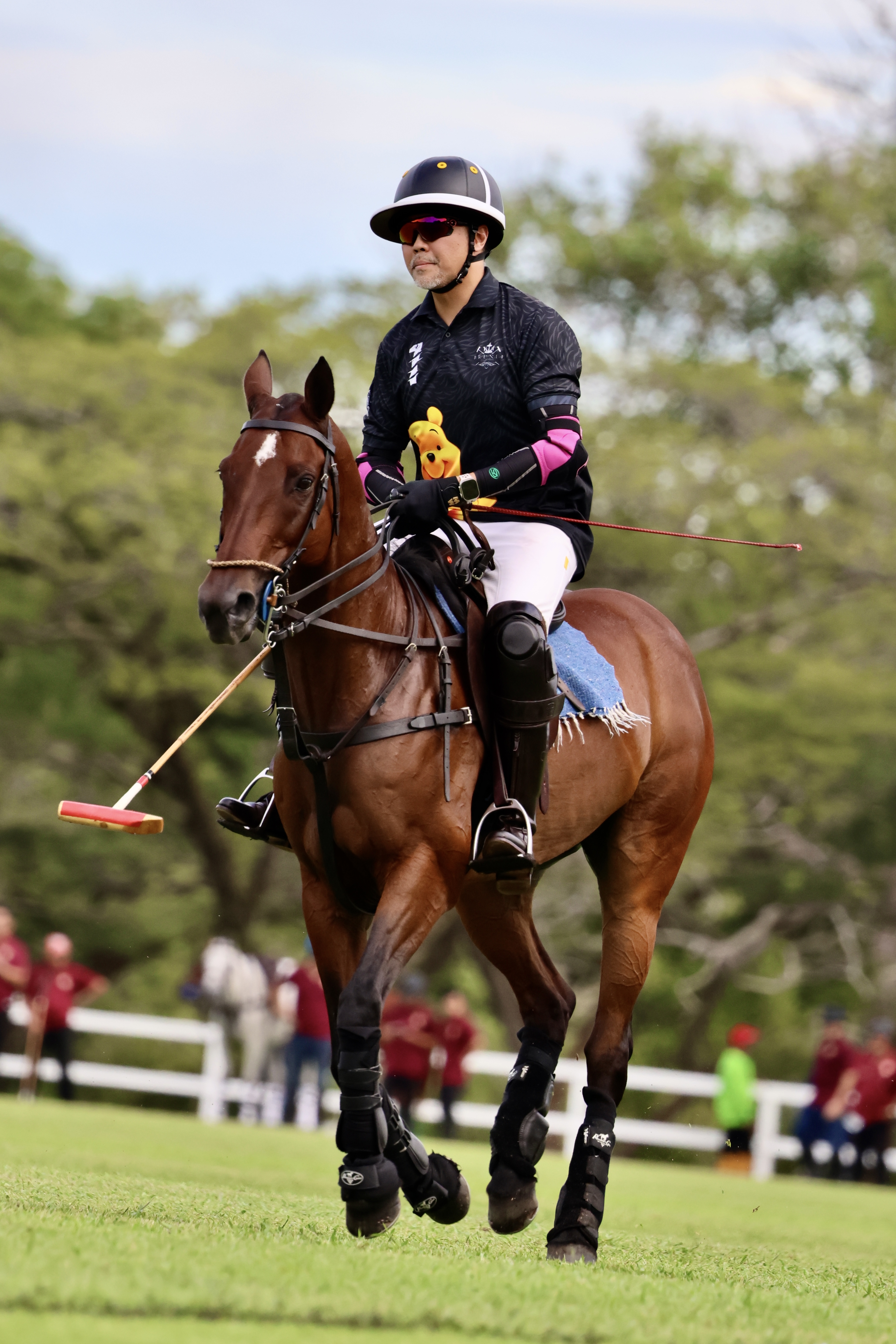
Pengiran Anak Ali playing in the 2024 Charity Polo Day

Pengiran Anak Ali participated in a number of public gatherings and opening ceremonies, such as the Lumba Basikal Brunei Grandprix 2018, the 2017 Borneo Kustom Show (BKS) at BRIDEX and the 2019 Brunei Classic bicycle race.

Pengiran Anak Ali is a polo player who frequently plays in exhibition matches, such as being a member of Team Yellow in the 2016 Richard Mille Gold Cup Charity Polo Final, Team Grey for the 2017 Richard Mille Gold Cup Charity Polo Final, Team Pacman for the 2023 Charity Polo Day and Team Bears for the 2024 Charity Polo Day at the Royal Brunei Polo and Riding Club in Kampong Jerudong.

== Marriage and children ==
On 17 April 2005, Pengiran Anak Ali married Pengiran Anak Hamidah Jamalul Bulqiah in Brunei. Pengiran Anak Hamidah was his first cousin and the daughter of Prince Jefri Bolkiah and Pengiran Norhayati. The first marriage ceremony took place at the groom's residence at Kampong Telanai, with several members of the royal family in attendance, including his uncle, Sultan Hassanal Bolkiah, and his family. Afterwards, Queen Saleha granted her permission to attend the bride's Bersanding ceremony in Hamidah's Kampong Jerudong house. The pair was then given a second wedding by Prince Jefri Bolkiah in the ballroom of the sultan's hotel, the Grosvenor House Hotel in London, which is located right next to the Dorchester. Together, they have 3 children:

- Pengiran Anak Abdul Muta'ali Haziq Hamidullah
- Pengiran Anak Adriana Haziqah Jaida Bulqiah
- Pengiran Anak Alisha Husnara Jaida Bulqiah

== Honours ==
Pengiran Anak Ali has earned the following honours;

- Sultan of Brunei Silver Jubilee Medal (5 October 1992)
- Sultan of Brunei Golden Jubilee Medal (5 October 2017)
- National Day Silver Jubilee Medal (23 February 2009)
