= Humayon Dar =

Pakistani economist

- Born: Muhammad Humayon Abbas Dar; 1970 (age 55–56); Ghakhar Mandi, Pakistan
- Education: International Islamic University; University of Cambridge
- Occupation: Economist
- Title: Director General, Cambridge Institute of Islamic Finance

Humayon Dar (born 1970) is a Pakistani-British economist and scholar in the field of Islamic banking and finance. He is the director general of the Cambridge Institute of Islamic Finance. Dar has held academic and professional positions, including director general of the Islamic Research & Training Institute, a member of the Islamic Development Bank Group.

Dar is the chairman of the Cambridge-Edbiz Group, which includes Edbiz Consulting and Cambridge IFA. He has served on the Sharia advisory boards of several financial institutions, including Arabesque Asset Management, Abu Dhabi Commercial Bank, and Hong Leong Islamic Bank Malaysia. He was previously a managing director at Deutsche Bank, where he headed its Islamic finance subsidiary, Dar Al Istithmar. He has also been a visiting professor at universities in the UK, Malaysia, and the Middle East.

Although not a classically trained Islamic scholar, he has studied Islamic sciences, such as Quranic hermeneutics. His academic influences include Muhammad Umer Chapra, Khurshid Ahmad, Anas Zarqa, Nejatullah Siddiqi, and Abdul Rahman Yousri.

== Education and personal life ==
Dar was born in Ghakhar Mandi, in the Punjab province of Pakistan. After completing his secondary education in his hometown, Dar attended Government College Lahore (now Government College University, Lahore) before enrolling at the International Islamic University in 1986.

Dar holds a Bachelor of Science (Hons) and a Master of Science, both in Islamic Economics, from the International Islamic University. He also earned an MPhil and a PhD in Economics from the University of Cambridge.

== Career ==
Dar co-founded an MSc programme in Islamic economics, banking and finance at Loughborough University with John Presley. He also helped Bayes Business School (formerly Cass Business School) at City, University of London create an Executive MBA in Islamic Finance. He has held a visiting professorship in Islamic Finance at Universiti Teknologi MARA (UiTM) and an adjunct professorship at COMSATS University Islamabad.

In 2005, Dar joined Dar Al Istithmar, a joint venture between Deutsche Bank, the Oxford Centre for Islamic Studies, and Russell Wood, created to advise on Sharia-compliant financial products. In March 2006, Dar was appointed managing director of Dar Al Istithmar and a managing director at Deutsche Bank. The firm received the "Best Islamic Advisory & Assurance" award from Euromoney in 2006 and 2007.

In 2007, the Dar Al Istithmar team was acquired by the BMB Group, and the resulting company was renamed BMB Islamic, with Dar appointed as its CEO. In 2008, BMB Islamic became a member of the Accounting and Auditing Organisation for Islamic Financial Institutions.

Dar founded Edbiz Consulting Limited in 2011 and Cambridge IFA, a financial intelligence firm, in 2014. Through his Sharia advisory role with Nasdaq OMX, he contributed to the development of the Nasdaq-100 Sharia and OMX 30 Sharia indices.

Dar is the founding editor of the Global Islamic Finance Report, an annual publication on the Islamic financial services industry. In 2011, he established the Global Islamic Finance Awards (GIFA), an annual event that recognizes achievements in the industry.

== Publications ==
Harbury, C.; Lipsey, R. G.; Dar, H. A. (2008). An Introduction to the UK Economy: Britain in the World Marketplace. Financial Times/Prentice Hall. ISBN 978-0-273-71858-1.

Dar, H. A.; Moghul, U. F., eds. (2009). The Chancellor Guide to the Legal and Shari'a Aspects of Islamic Finance. London: Chancellor Publications. ISBN 978-1-899217-09-0.

Dar, H. A., ed. (2013). Islam and Economic Development. Cheltenham: Edward Elgar Publishing. ISBN 978-1847201387.

Dar, H. A.; Azmi, S., eds. (2016). Global Islamic Financial Report 2016: Islamic Financial Policy. Cambridge: Cambridge Institute of Islamic Finance.
