= Pengiran Abu Bakar =

Bruneian legislative speaker (1906–1985)

Yang Amat Mulia Pengiran Jaya Negara Pengiran Abu Bakar أبو بكر DK PSNB MBE PHBS POAS PJK
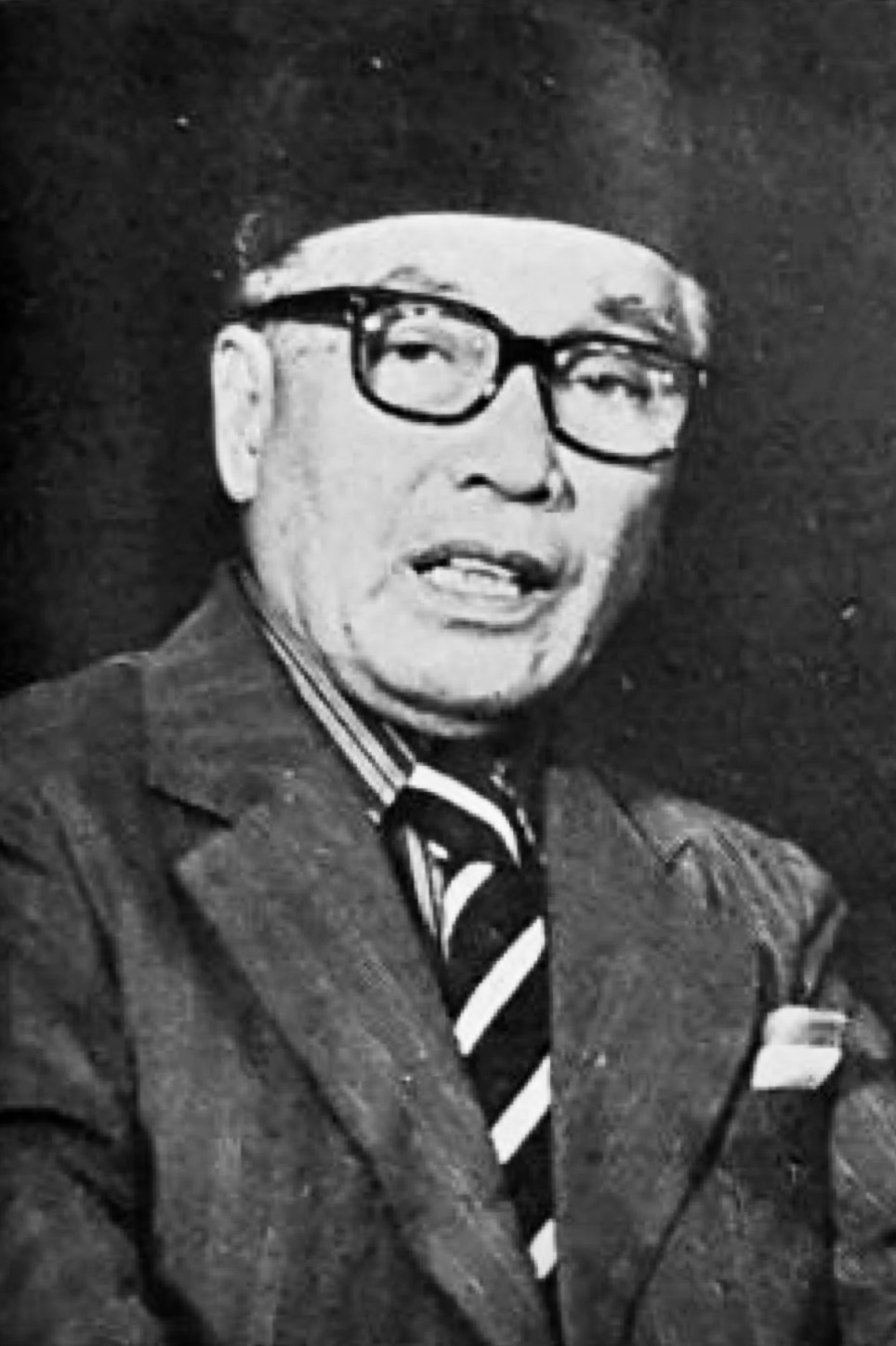
- Pengiran Abu Bakar in 1972

5th Speaker of the Legislative Council of Brunei
- In office 1 December 1974 – 1981
- Monarch: Hassanal Bolkiah
- Menteri Besar: Pengiran Abdul Momin; Abdul Aziz Umar (Acting)
- Preceded by: Pengiran Anak Mohamed Alam
- Succeeded by: Pengiran Anak Kemaluddin

Personal details
- Born: 9 September 1906 Brunei Town, Brunei
- Died: 11 June 1985 (aged 78) Bandar Seri Begawan, Brunei
- Resting place: Kianggeh Muslim Cemetery, Bandar Seri Begawan, Brunei
- Relations: Princess Masna (daughter-in-law)
- Children: Pengiran Mohammad Said; Pengiran Anak Abdul Aziz; Pengiran Zuliana; Pengiran Aisah; Pengiran Salmah

Pengiran Abu Bakar bin Pengiran Umar (9 September 1906 – 11 June 1985) was a Bruneian nobleman, civil servant, and politician who served as the fifth Speaker of the Legislative Council of Brunei. He held this position from 1 December 1974 until his retirement on 14 December 1981. Notably, he was the father-in-law of Princess Masna. His son, Pengiran Anak Abdul Aziz, became the prince consort of Princess Masna, who is the daughter of Sultan Omar Ali Saifuddien III.

== Early life and education ==
Pengiran Abu Bakar was born on 9 September 1906 in Brunei Town. He began his formal education in 1914 at a mosque in Kampong Sultan Lama.

== Political career ==
Pengiran Abu Bakar served as a clerk at the office of British Resident in 1920 at the age of 14, and later served at the Kuala Belait Customs Department in 1923 and 1929. He continued serving as a clerk at Brunei Town and Tutong District office from 1926 until 1928. After peace was restored in Tutong District, Inche Awang willingly resigned as Tutong District Officer on 1 January 1946, and his place was replaced by Pengiran Abu Bakar. In 1959, he alongside then-Prince Hassanal Bolkiah and Prince Mohamed Bolkiah visited the Seria oil field in Belait District. In 1962, he was elected as the secretary general of Brunei Students' Association in the United Kingdom.

Upon his retirement from government services in 1962, based on his excellent service record Pengiran Abu Bakar was appointed administrative assistant at the Development Department and later at the Election Office. During his tenure, he led a delegation, as chairman, which consisted of Salleh Kadir and Pengiran Jaya were sent to attend the 1969 Malaysian general election on 10 May. In 1971, he was appointed District Officer of Belait. On 10 June 1972, he officiated the Students' Day Celebration at the Muhammad Alam Malay School, Seria.

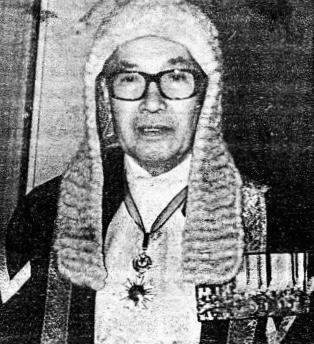
Pengiran Abu Bakar as Speaker of Brunei's Legislative Council.

On 1 December 1974 the Sultan appointed Pengiran Abu Bakar as the Speaker of the Legislative Council to replace Pengiran Anak Mohamed Alam who retired from the position.

== Death ==
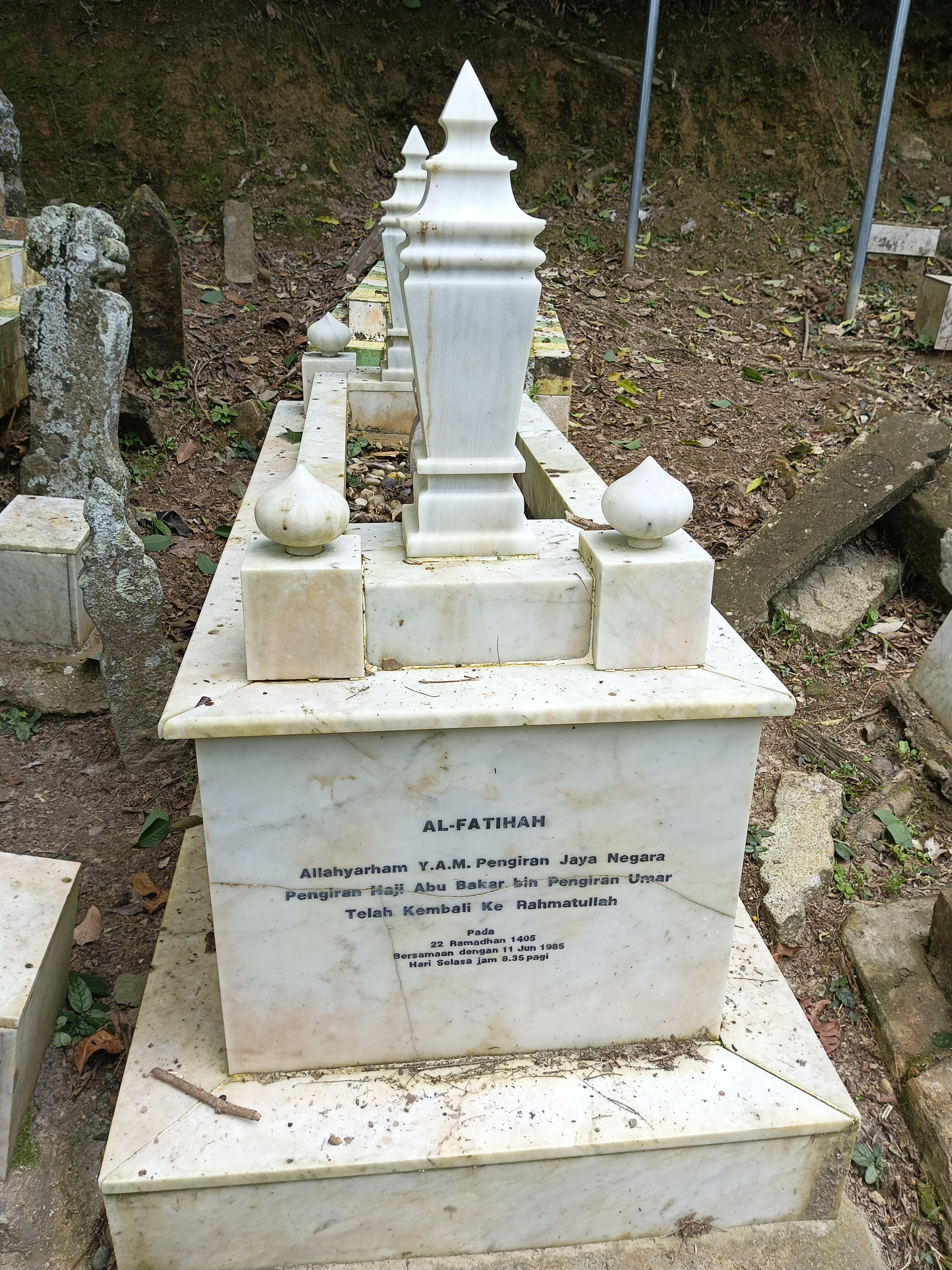
Grave of Pengiran Abu Bakar at Kianggeh Muslim Cemetery, Bandar Seri Begawan

Pengiran Abu Bakar died at the age of 78 on 11 June 1985. He was survived by his wife, eight children, 32 grandchildren and 12 great-grandchildren. His body returned to his residence at Kampong Sungai Tilong. He was laid to rest at the Kianggeh Muslim Cemetery in Bandar Seri Begawan.

== Personal life ==
Pengiran Abu Bakar had a son, Pengiran Lela Cheteria Sahibun Najabah Pengiran Anak Haji Abdul Aziz, who later became the prince consort to Princess Masna, the younger sister of Sultan Hassanal Bolkiah. Another of his sons, Pengiran Lela Perkasa Pengiran Mohammad Said, was a member of the Cheteria. He also had several other children, including Pengiran Zuliana, Pengiran Aisah, and Pengiran Salmah.

== Titles, styles and honours ==
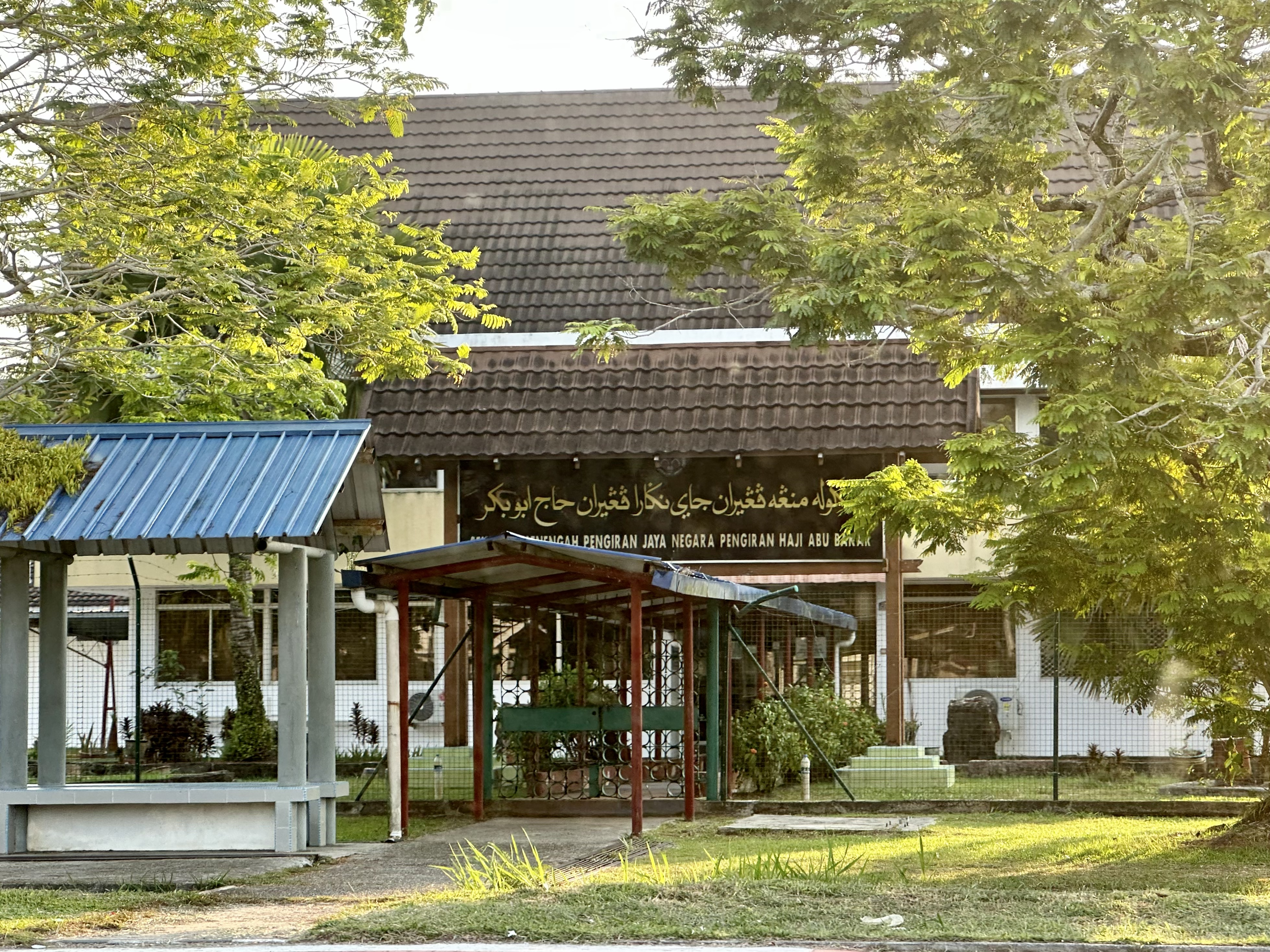
Pengiran Jaya Negara Pengiran Haji Abu Bakar Secondary School

=== Titles and styles ===
In recognition of his commitment and accomplishments to the nation and the monarchy, the Sultan bestowed upon him a number of Cheteria titles, referred to as Yang Amat Mulia in the honorific. Among these titles are:

- 7 March 1968 – 16 May 1968: Pengiran Seri Utama
- 16 May 1968 – 11 June 1985: Pengiran Jaya Negara

=== Honours ===
National

He has earned several honours which included:

- Family Order of Seri Utama (DK; 1970) – Dato Seri Utama
- Order of Setia Negara Brunei First Class (PSNB) – Dato Seri Setia
- Order of Setia Negara Brunei Second Class (DSNB) – Dato Setia
- Omar Ali Saifuddin Medal Second Class (POAS; 23 September 1958)
- Sultan Hassanal Bolkiah Medal First Class (PHBS; 15 July 1970)
- Meritorious Service Medal (PJK)
- Campaign Medal (23 September 1967)

Foreign

- United Kingdom:
  - Honorary Member of the Order of the British Empire (MBE; 1952)

=== Things named after him ===
Several places were named after him, including:

- Pengiran Jaya Negara Pengiran Haji Abu Bakar Secondary School, a school in Kuala Belait.
- Jalan Jaya Negara, a road in Kuala Belait.

Political offices
Preceded by Pengiran Anak Mohamed Alam	5th Speaker of the Legislative Council of Brunei; 1 December 1974 – 1981	Succeeded by Pengiran Anak Kemaluddin
