= Pengiran Anak Abdul Aziz =

Bruneian prince (born 1945)

Abdul Aziz عبد العزيز
- Pengiran Lela Cheteria Sahibun Najabah
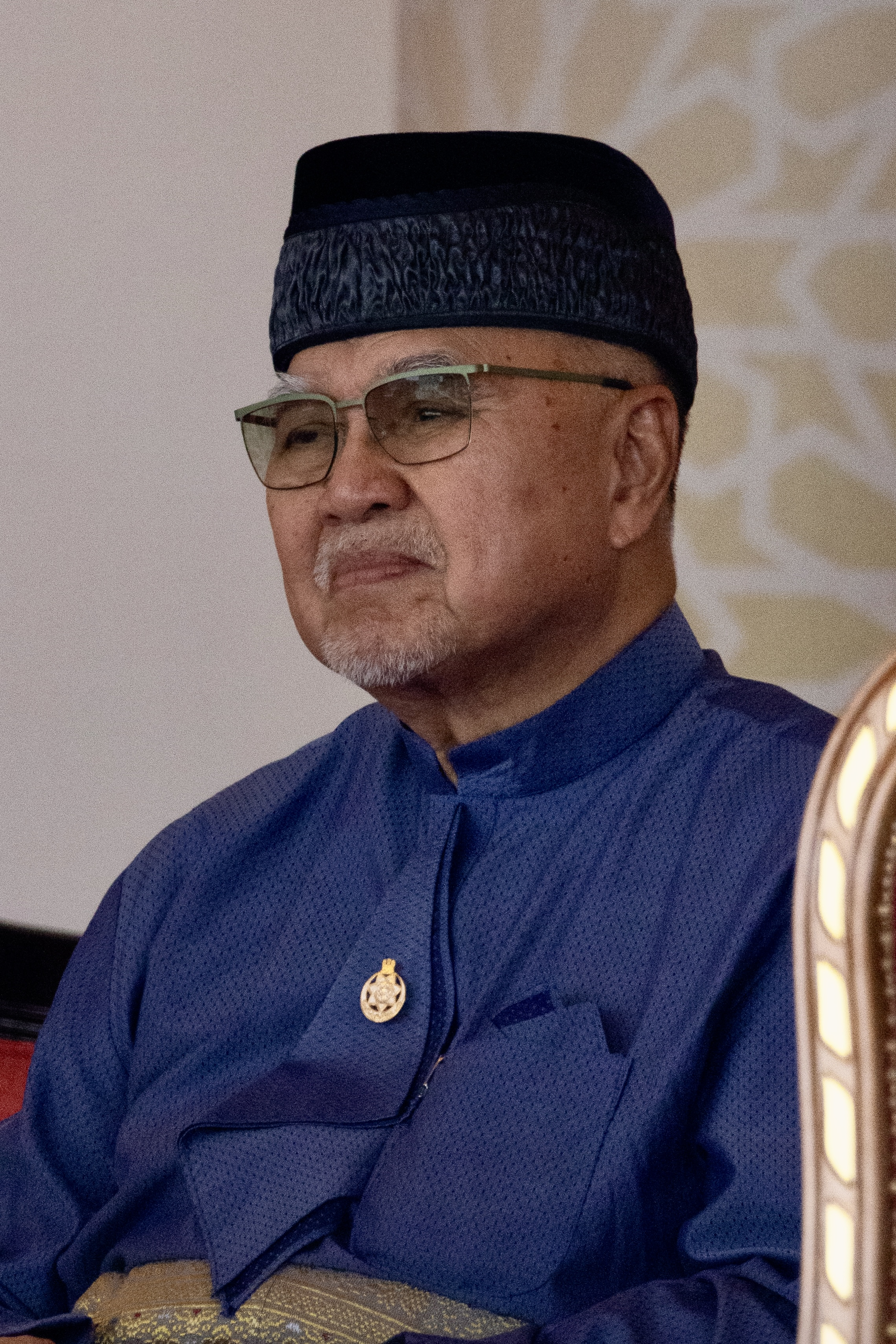
- Abdul Aziz in 2024

3rd Chief of Adat Istiadat Negara
- In office 1 July 2000 – 8 April 2021
- Monarch: Hassanal Bolkiah
- Preceded by: Mohamed Yusof bin Mohamed Alam
- Succeeded by: Idris bin Abdul Kahar
- Born: Abdul Aziz bin Abu Bakar; 23 September 1945 (age 81); Kampong Kianggeh, Brunei Town, Brunei
- Spouse: Princess Masna (m. 1969)
- Issue: List: Abdul Wadood Bolkiah; Mohammed Al-Mokhtar; Abdul 'Ali Yil-Kabier; Ameenah Bushral Bulqiah; Abdul Quddus
- House: Bolkiah
- Father: Abu Bakar Umar
- Police career
- Country: Brunei
- Department: Royal Brunei Police Force
- Service years: 1967–1971
- Rank: Inspector

Abdul Aziz bin Abu Bakar (born 23 September 1945) is a member of the Bruneian royal family as the husband of Princess Masna. He served as the Controller of the Royal Customs and Excise Department and later as the Chief of the Jabatan Adat Istiadat Negara or Department of the State Customs.

== Early life and education ==
Abdul Aziz was born on 23 September 1945 in Kampong Kianggeh, Brunei Town to Pengiran Jaya Negara Pengiran Abu Bakar bin Umar. He began his elementary education at Pekan Brunei Malay School in 1954, followed by Jamalul Alam Malay School, Ahmad Tajuddin Malay School (1956–1958), St. Michael's School (1958–1959), and Anthony Abell College (1959–1966).

== Marriage and issue ==
In November 1969, Abdul Aziz married Princess Masna at Istana Darul Hana.

They have five children who all have the style of Yang Amat Mulia and the title of Pengiran Anak.

- Abdul Wadood Bolkiah, married Pengiran Seti Aminah binti Pengiran Othman
- Mohammed Al-Mokhtar
- Abdul 'Ali Yil-Kabier, married Pengiran Anak Hamidah Jamalul Bulqiah binti Prince Jefri Bolkiah
- Ameenah Bushral Bulqiah
- Abdul Quddus, married Pengiran Ratna Siti Nooraishah binti Pengiran Dato Paduka Hamzah

== Career ==
Abdul Aziz worked as a police officer from 1 January 1967 until 28 November 1971. He later was one of the concept contributors for the change in the name of the Police Force to the Royal Brunei Police Force. He also made changes to the flag, pattern, and uniform color of the department's officers and staff during his tenure as the Controller of the Royal Customs and Excise Department.

On 29 November 1971, Abdul Aziz was appointed as the Deputy Controller of the Royal Customs and Excise Department. He then served as the Controller from 1975 to 2000.

On 20 August 1986, Abdul Aziz was appointed Grand Chamberlain of Jabatan Adat Istiadat Negara or Department of the State Customs. On 1 April 2000, he was promoted to Chief or Yang Di-Pertua of the department and served until 8 April 2021 when he retired.

On 2 May 2025, Abdul Aziz attended and officiated the opening ceremony of the 2025 Lela Cheteria Cup Football League, an association football league tournament for under-18s that bears his name.

== Titles, styles and honours ==
=== Titles and styles ===
Styles of Abdul Aziz bin Abu Bakar
- Reference style: Yang Amat Mulia
- Alternative style: His Highness

Abdul Aziz is a member of the Cheteria and has been bestowed several titles related to offices held.

- 23 September 1945 – 6 November 1969: Yang Mulia Pengiran Abdul Aziz bin Pengiran Jaya Negara Abu Bakar
- 6 November 1969 – 14 January 1970: Yang Amat Mulia Pengiran Anak Abdul Aziz bin Pengiran Jaya Negara Abu Bakar
- 14 January 1970 – 2 August 1972: Yang Amat Mulia Pengiran Maharaja Setia Laila Diraja Sahibul Irshad Pengiran Anak Abdul Aziz bin Pengiran Jaya Negara Abu Bakar
- 2 August 1972 – 8 April 1975: Yang Amat Mulia Pengiran Shahbandar Sahibul Bandar Pengiran Anak Abdul Aziz bin Pengiran Jaya Negara Abu Bakar
- 8 April 1975 – present: Yang Amat Mulia Pengiran Lela Cheteria Sahibun Najabah Pengiran Anak Abdul Aziz bin Pengiran Jaya Negara Abu Bakar

=== Honours ===
Personal standard of Pengiran Lela Cheteria Sahibun Najabah

==== National ====
- Family Order of Laila Utama (DK; 1972) – Dato Seri Utama
- Family Order of Seri Utama (DK; 15 July 1970) – Dato Seri Utama
- Sultan Hassanal Bolkiah Medal (PHBS)
- Pingat Bakti Laila Ikhlas (PBLI)
- Meritorious Service Medal (PJK)
- Long Service Medal (PKL)
- Proclamation of Independence Medal (1 January 1984)
- Coronation Medal (1 August 1968)
- Sultan of Brunei Golden Jubilee Medal (5 October 2017)
- Sultan of Brunei Silver Jubilee Medal (5 October 1992)

==== Foreign ====
- Egypt:
  - Grand Cordon of the Order of the Nile
- Thailand:
  - Knight Grand Cross of the Order of the White Elephant (12 November 1988)
- Sarawak:
  - Knight Commander of the Order of the Star of Sarawak (PNBS)
- Selangor:
  - Sultan Salahuddin Silver Jubilee Medal (3 September 1985)
- South Korea:
  - Order of Diplomatic Service Merit, Heung-in Medal

Political offices
| Preceded by Pengiran Anak Mohamed Yusof | 3rd Chief of Adat Istiadat Negara | Succeeded by Pengiran Anak Idris |
