= Princess Masna of Brunei =

Bruneian princess (born 1948)

Princess Masna مسنا
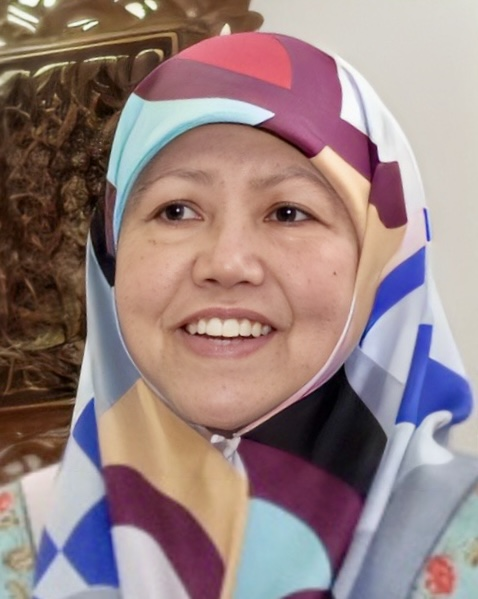
- Princess Masna in 2019
- Born: Masna binti Omar Ali Saifuddien; 6 September 1948 (age 78); Istana Darussalam, Brunei Town, British Protectorate of Brunei
- Spouse: Abdul Rahman ibn Muhammad Hashim (m. 1965, divorced) Abdul Aziz ibn Abu Bakar (m. 1969)
- Issue: Abdul Wadood Bolkiah; Mohammed Al-Mokhtar; Abdul 'Ali Yil-Kabier; Ameenah Bushral Bulqiah; Abdul Quddus
- House: Bolkiah
- Father: Omar Ali Saifuddien III
- Mother: Damit binti Abdul Rahman
- Religion: Sunni Islam
- Occupation: Diplomat
- Education: Universiti Brunei Darussalam

Masna binti Omar Ali Saifuddien III (Jawi: مسنا; born 6 September 1948) is a member of the royal family of Brunei. She is the daughter of Sultan Omar Ali Saifuddien III and the sister of Sultan Hassanal Bolkiah. Princess Masna has had a long career as a diplomat and is currently the Ambassador-at-Large at the Ministry of Foreign Affairs.

== Early life ==
Princess Masna was born on 6 September 1948 at Istana Darussalam, Brunei Town to Sultan Omar Ali Saifuddien III and Queen Damit. She is their oldest daughter and has nine siblings.

== Education ==
Masna began her education privately at the school set up for the royal family at Istana Darul Hana. She later attended the Raja Isteri Girls' High School.

Princess Masna earned a Bachelor of Arts with first class honours in Public Policy and Administration and a Master's degree in Public Policy from Universiti Brunei Darussalam.

== Marriages and children ==
In September 1965, Princess Masna married her first cousin, Pengiran Muda Abdul Rahman ibni Pengiran Anak Muhammad Hashim at Istana Darul Hana. They divorced at an unknown date and he died in 2011.

In November 1969, she married for the second time to Pengiran Anak Abdul Aziz bin Pengiran Abu Bakar at Istana Darul Hana.

They have five children who all have the style of Yang Amat Mulia and the title of Pengiran Anak (Lord / Lady).

- Abdul Wadood Bolkiah, married Pengiran Seti Aminah binti Pengiran Othman
- Mohammed Al-Mokhtar
- Abdul 'Ali Yil-Kabier, married Pengiran Anak Hamidah Jamalul Bulqiah binti Prince Jefri Bolkiah
- Ameenah Bushral Bulqiah
- Abdul Quddus, married Pengiran Ratna Siti Nooraishah binti Pengiran Dato Paduka Hamzah

== Diplomatic career ==
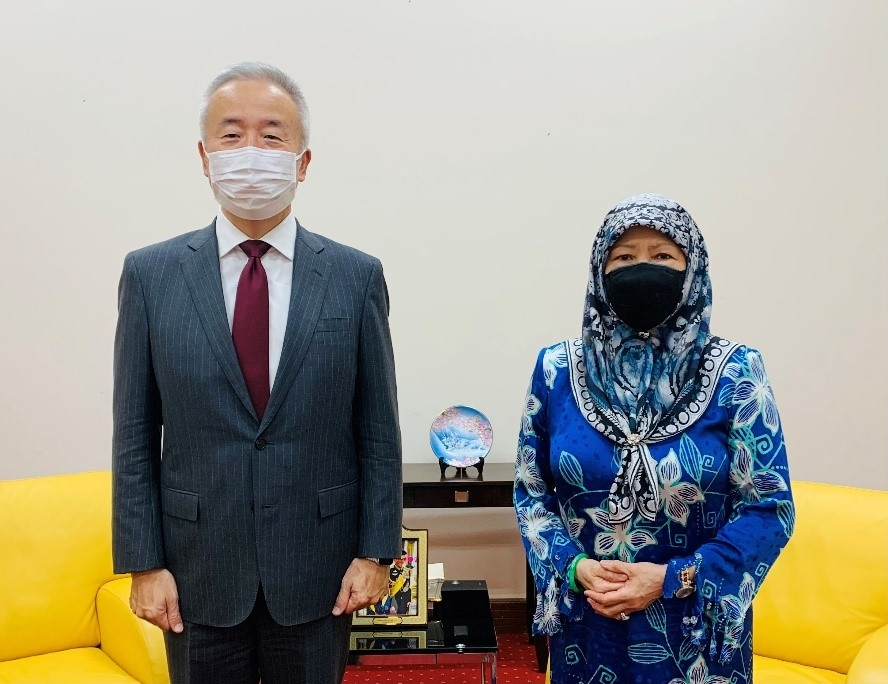
Princess Masna meeting with Ambassador Maeda of Japan in 2022

In 1995, she was appointed as the Ambassador-at-Large at the Ministry of Foreign Affairs where she led a number of delegations abroad both as Acting Minister of Foreign Affairs as well as Ambassador-at-large. She is also active in other areas including being the Patron for the Girl Guides Association as well as being Commander of the Women's Police Corps.

Timeline of her career as a diplomat:

- 1995: Ambassador-at-Large and Second in Command of the Foreign Affairs
- 1997: Acting Minister of Foreign Affairs
- 1998: (March–April) Acting Minister of Foreign Affairs
- 1999: Acting Minister of Foreign Affairs
- 2000: (November) Acting Minister of Foreign Affairs (Head of the APEC Summit)
- 2001: Acting Minister of Foreign Affairs (Head of Delegation to ASEM Summit)
- 2002: (January) Acting Minister of Foreign Affairs
- 2003: (June) Acting Minister of Foreign Affairs (Head of Delegation to ASEAN Summit)
- 2004: (June/July) Acting Minister of Foreign Affairs (Head of Delegation to ASEAN Summit)
- 2010: Ambassador-at-Large at the Ministry of Foreign Affairs and Trade

== Titles, styles, and honours ==
=== Title and style ===
Her full title and style is Yang Teramat Mulia Paduka Seri Pengiran Anak Puteri Masna binti Omar Ali Saifuddien Sa'adul Khairi Waddien It is usually translated in English as Her Royal Highness Princess Masna of Brunei.

=== Honours ===
==== National ====
- Family Order of Laila Utama (DK; 28 October 1970)
- Royal Family Order of the Crown of Brunei (DKMB)
- Sultan Hassanal Bolkiah Medal (PHBS; 1 August 1968)
- Sultan of Brunei Silver Jubilee Medal (5 October 1992)
- Sultan of Brunei Golden Jubilee Medal (5 October 2017)
- Proclamation of Independence Medal (1 January 1984)
- General Service Medal (Police)
- Police 75 Years Medal (1996)
- Police 100 Years Medal (2021)

==== Foreign ====
- Thailand :
  - Dame Grand Cross of the Order of the White Elephant (MPCh (GCE); 26 August 2002)

=== Namesakes ===
- Sekolah Ugama Pengiran Anak Puteri Masna, a religious school in Kampong Beribi
