= Ong (surname) =

Ong is a Hokkien romanization of several Chinese surnames: 王 (Wáng in Hanyu Pinyin), 汪 (also Wāng), 黃 (traditional) or 黄 (simplified; Huáng); and 翁 (Weng). Ong or Onge is also a surname of English origin, with earliest known records found in Western Suffolk taxation records from c. 1280 AD. Ong (or Онгь in Russian language-based records) is also an Estonian surname, possibly derived from õng, meaning "fishing rod/hook".

Ong has also been used to romanize the Taishanese pronunciation of 鄧 (more commonly romanized as Deng or Teng), as in the case of Betty Ong.

== Romanization ==
Under the Pe̍h-ōe-jī romanization system, 王 but not the other names includes a circumflex over its vowel: Ông. However, this is often omitted in practice.

== Distribution ==
In Singapore, Ong is the fifth-most-common surname among Singaporean residents. In the United States, Ong was the 6,682nd most common surname during the 1990 US census and the 4,343rd most common surname during the year 2000 US census.

== Notable Ongs ==
- Ong Ai Leng (born 1978), Malaysian actress
- Aihwa Ong (born 1950), Malaysian sociocultural anthropologist
- Andy Ong (born 1970), Singaporean entrepreneur, author and property investor
- Angelia Ong (born 1990), Filipina model and beauty pageant titleholder
- Anthea Ong, Singaporean politician
- Augustine Ong (born 1934), Malaysian scientist and academic
- Beatrix Ong, British fashion designer
- Ong Beng Hee (born 1980), Malaysian professional squash player
- Ong Beng Seng (born 1946), Malaysian billionaire businessman
- Ong Beng Teong (born 1962), Malaysian badminton player and coach
- Benny Ong, Singaporean fashion designer and textile artist
- Bernadette Ong, Singaporean actress, emcee, model, and beauty pageant titleholder
- Betty Ong (1956–2001), American flight attendant, killed in the September 11 attacks
- Bob Ong, Filipino author
- Ong Boon Hua, birth name of Chin Peng, Malaysian politician and anti-fascist activist
- Ong Boon Pang (1882–1940), Bruneian businessman and Kapitan Cina
- Canny Ong (1974–2003), Malaysian murder and rape victim
- Cassandra Ong (born 2000), Filipino businesswoman
- Christina Ong (born 1947), Singaporean businesswoman
- Daniel Ong (born 1975), Singaporean businessman, radio DJ and television host
- Daryl Ong (born 1987), Filipino singer-songwriter
- David Ong (born 1961), Singaporean politician
- Ong Eng Guan, Singaporean politician
- Ong Ewe Hock (born 1972), Malaysian badminton player
- Glenn Ong (born 1970), Singaporean DJ
- Han Ong (born 1968), American playwright and novelist
- Haydee Ong (born 1970), Filipino basketball coach and former player
- Ong Hock Thye (1908–1977), Malaysian judge
- Ong Hok Ham (1933–2007), Chinese Indonesian historian
- Ong Huay Dee (1935–2000), Singaporean taxi driver and murder victim
- Ong Iok-tek (1924–1985), Taiwanese scholar and politician
- Jack Ong (1940–2017), American actor, writer, activist and marketing professional
- Jeo Ong (born 2007), Filipino social media influencer
- Jaymee Ong (born 1979), Australian model and actress
- John D. Ong (born 1933), American businessman
- Ong Ka Chuan (born 1954), Malaysian politician
- Ong Ka Ting (born 1956), Malaysian politician
- Ong Kee Hui (1914–2000), Malaysian Chinese politician
- Ong Keng Sen (born 1963), Singaporean theatre director
- Ong Keng Yong (born 1954), Singaporean diplomat
- Kerstin Ong (born 1997), Singaporean athlete
- Ong Khan (?–1203), khan of the Keraites
- Khanh Ong, Australian cook, television personality, author and restaurateur
- Ong Kian Ming (born 1975), Malaysian politician and lecturer
- Ong Kiat Guan (c. 1930–1983), Singaporean basketball player
- Ong Kim Kee (1931–1998), businessman and community leader
- Ong Kim Seng (born 1945), Singaporean watercolor artist
- Ong Kok Hai (1945–2026), Malaysian microbiologist
- Leonard Ong (born 1992), Singaporean sailor
- Melissa Ong (born 1993), American Internet influencer, TikToker, YouTuber, and former user experience designer
- Melvyn Ong, Singaporean lieutenant-general
- Meng Ong, Singaporean filmmaker
- Michelle Ong, Hong Kong jeweller, philanthropist and businesswoman
- Mindee Ong (born 1979), Singaporean actress
- Monica Ong, Asian-American visual poet
- Nai Phuan Ong (born 1948), American experimental physicist
- Natalie Ong (born 2000), Singaporean Australian singer-songwriter
- Nathania Ong (born 1998), Singaporean actress and singer
- Olivia Ong (born 1985), Singaporean singer and actress
- Ong Pang Boon (born 1929), Singaporean retired politician
- Peter Ong, Singaporean civil servant
- Ong Poh Lim (1923–2003), Malaysian Singaporean badminton player
- Rachel Ong, Singaporean politician and businesswoman
- Remy Ong (born 1978), Singaporean bowler
- Richard Ong (born 1965), Malaysian businessman and investor
- Russell Ong, Singaporean swimmer
- Ryan Ong Palao, Filipino-American drag performer and HIV awareness activist
- Samuel Ong (1945–2009), Filipino whistleblower
- Ong Schan Tchow (1900–1945), Chinese patriot artist
- Ong Seok Kim (1884–1964), Malaysian educationist, social worker and philanthropist
- Ong Seong-wu (born 1995), South Korean singer and actor
- Ong Soh Khim, Singaporean academic and politician
- Ong Soo Hin, Malaysian Chinese businessman
- Ong Soon Hock (born 1985), Malaysian badminton player
- Suan-Li Ong, British actress and model
- Ong Teck Chin (born 1949), Singaporean educator
- Ong Teng Cheong (1936–2002), Singaporean architect, union leader and politician
- Ong Teng Koon (born 1977), Singaporean businessman and former politician
- Ong Teng Siew (born 1968), Malaysian chicken slaughterer and convicted killer
- Thomas Ong (born 1969), Singaporean actor, television host and businessman
- Ong Tiang Swee (1864–1950), businessman and philanthropist
- Walter J. Ong (1912–2003), American Jesuit priest, professor and philosopher
- Willie Ong, (born 1963) Filipino cardiologist, media personality and politician
- Wing Foon Ong (1904–1977), Chinese-born American politician, lawyer, and businessman
- Xavier Ong (born 1994), Singaporean actor
- Xuan Ong (born 1996), Singaporean actress
- Ong Ye Kung (born 1969), Singaporean politician
- Ong Yoke Lin (1917–2010), Malaysian politician, diplomat and businessman
