= Mother Hen =

Mother Hen may refer to:

- Mother Hen, a 1971 album by Jane Getz
- "Mother Hen", a song from the 2014 album Hyperborea by Flamingods
- "Mother Hen", a nickname for Melissa Ong
