= Lim Cheng Choo =

Bruneian businessman and politician (1906–1993)

Yang Berhormat Pehin Datu Temanggong Dato Seri Paduka Lim Cheng Choo SPMB SNB POAS PHBS
- 林清注
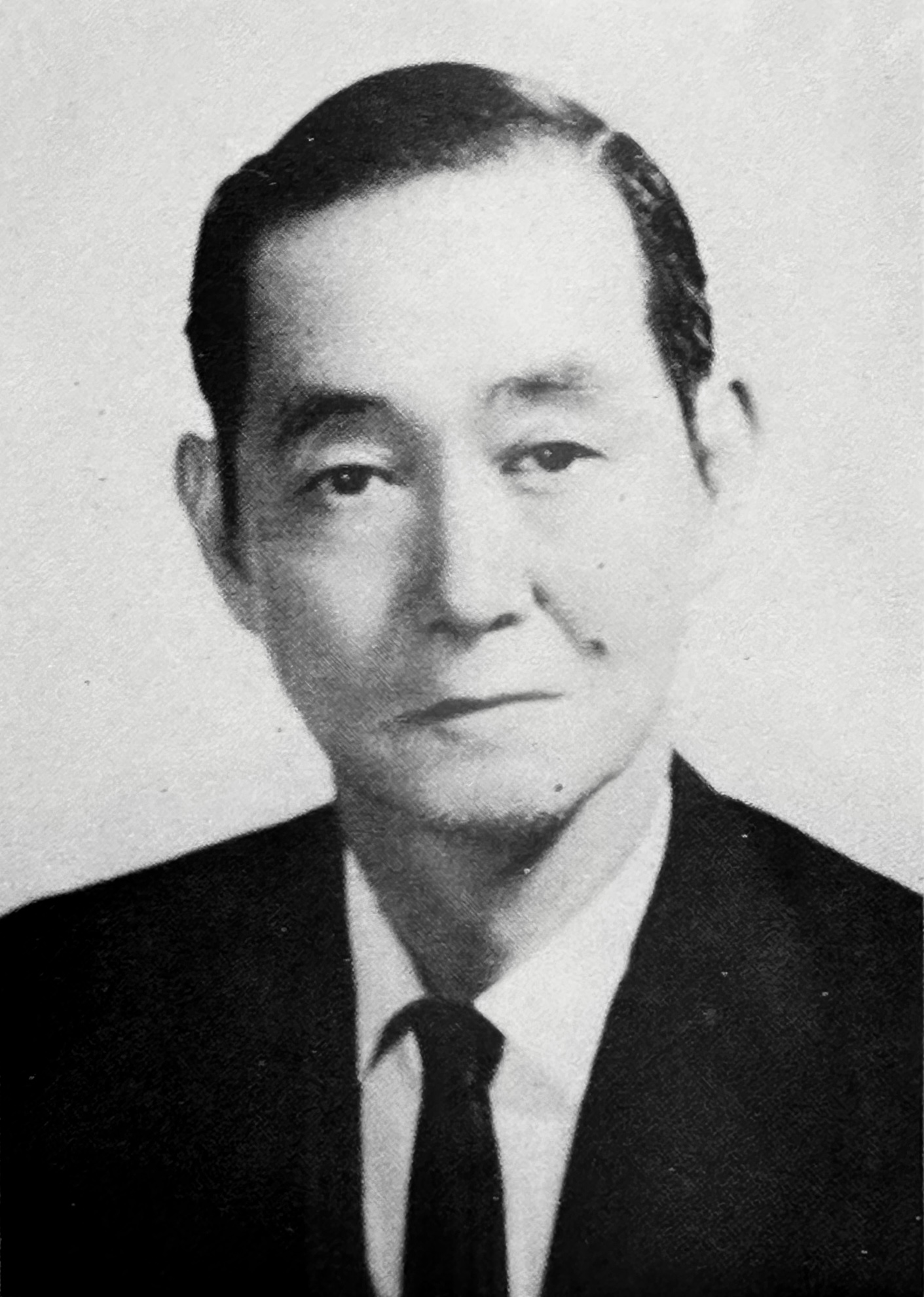
- Lim, c. 1972
- Born: 15 March 1905; Xizhai, Kinmen, Taiwan Province of the Great Qing
- Died: 31 December 1993 (aged 88); Brunei
- Occupations: Businessman; politician
- Known for: Member of Privy Council for Sultan Omar Ali Saifuddien III
- Spouse: Ong Ming Xuan (m. 1932)
- Father: Lim Wen Ji
- Relatives: Ong Boon Pang (father-in-law); Ong Kim Kee (brother-in-law)

Chinese name
- Simplified Chinese: 林清注
- Traditional Chinese: 林清注
Transcriptions
Standard Mandarin
- Hanyu Pinyin: Lín Qīngzhù
Southern Min
- Hokkien POJ: Lîm Chheng-chù

Lim Cheng Choo (Chinese: 林清注; pinyin: Lín Qīngzhù; Pe̍h-ōe-jī: Lîm Chheng-chù; 15 March 1905 – 31 December 1993) was a prominent Bruneian aristocrat, politician, and business leader. He served as a member of the Privy Council and was a key signatory of the 1959 Constitution of Brunei. As the first president of the Chinese Chamber of Commerce (CCC) in 1947, he was instrumental in uniting and advancing the interests of the Chinese business community. A staunch advocate for education, he was the longest-serving board member of Chung Hwa Middle School, Bandar Seri Begawan (CHMS, BSB), dedicating over five decades to its development and spearheading major fundraising initiatives. His contributions extended to fostering cultural harmony and promoting agricultural development, reflecting his broader vision for Brunei's progress.

== Early life ==
Lim was born on 15 March 1905 in Xizhai village, Kinmen, in Fujian, Taiwan. He lost his mother to illness when he was just three months old, and his aunt, Madam Ang, took care of him during his early years. His father, Lim Wen Ji, was engaged in the trading business, commuting between Brunei and their hometown. At the age of ten, Lim moved to Brunei to live with his father, where he attended school while also helping out at Ong Boon Pang's shop, Teck Guan Company, for a salary of $3 a month. He officially began working at Ong's shop when he turned sixteen, earning praise for his willingness to learn and strong work ethic. Lim married Ong's eldest daughter, Ong Ming Xuan, when he was 26, in 1932.

In 1915, Lim and his father arrived in Brunei from Kinmen, unsure of their new surroundings. After the loss of Lim's mother during his childhood, they traveled to Muara, where they boarded a small wooden boat to reach Brunei Town. Lim continued his education in China before starting work at Ong Boon Pang's Teck Guan Company at the age of sixteen. Demonstrating impressive commercial acumen at a young age, he was allowed to handle the pawnbroker's firm, showcasing his early promise as a businessman. Lim later became one of the most renowned Chinese leaders in Brunei.

== Business career ==
Dato Lim quickly gained the trust of Ong and was soon promoted to manager of Teck Guan Company. Following Ong's death in 1940, Lim took on the role of trustee, responsible for both managing the business and caring for Ong's younger children. Under his guidance, Ong's second son, Ong Kim Kee, was sent to Singapore to pursue his secondary education, while Lim also supported Ong's second daughter in her studies in China. During the Japanese occupation, Lim faced imprisonment for a week due to jealousy from a Japanese businessman, who framed him for various wrongdoings; he was eventually released after a friend helped clear his name.

Throughout the Japanese occupation, Lim frustrated the occupiers by refusing to provide information about the company, which led to him being beaten and imprisoned for three days before securing his release with the help of a friend. After the war, as the Chinese population in Brunei continued to grow, the need for an organization to support their welfare and address business disputes became apparent. This led to the establishment of The Chinese Association, which was officially registered in 1946 as a precursor to the CCC. Following extensive discussions, the committee agreed to the name change, and the CCC in Brunei Town was officially founded in 1947, with Lim appointed as its first president.

In addition to his contributions to the business sector, Lim also made significant contributions to education. In 1941, he took over as chairman of the Chung Hwa Middle School's board of directors from Ong, who had died the previous year. Lim held this position until 1943, during the most challenging years of the war. In 1961, when CHMS, BSB sought to construct a new two-storey classroom block, Lim eagerly led the fundraising efforts by becoming president of the building construction committee. Under his leadership, the new block was successfully completed within a year. Lim remained actively involved with the board until his death in 1993, making him its longest-serving member, with a remarkable total of fifty-two years dedicated to the school's development and success.

== Political career ==
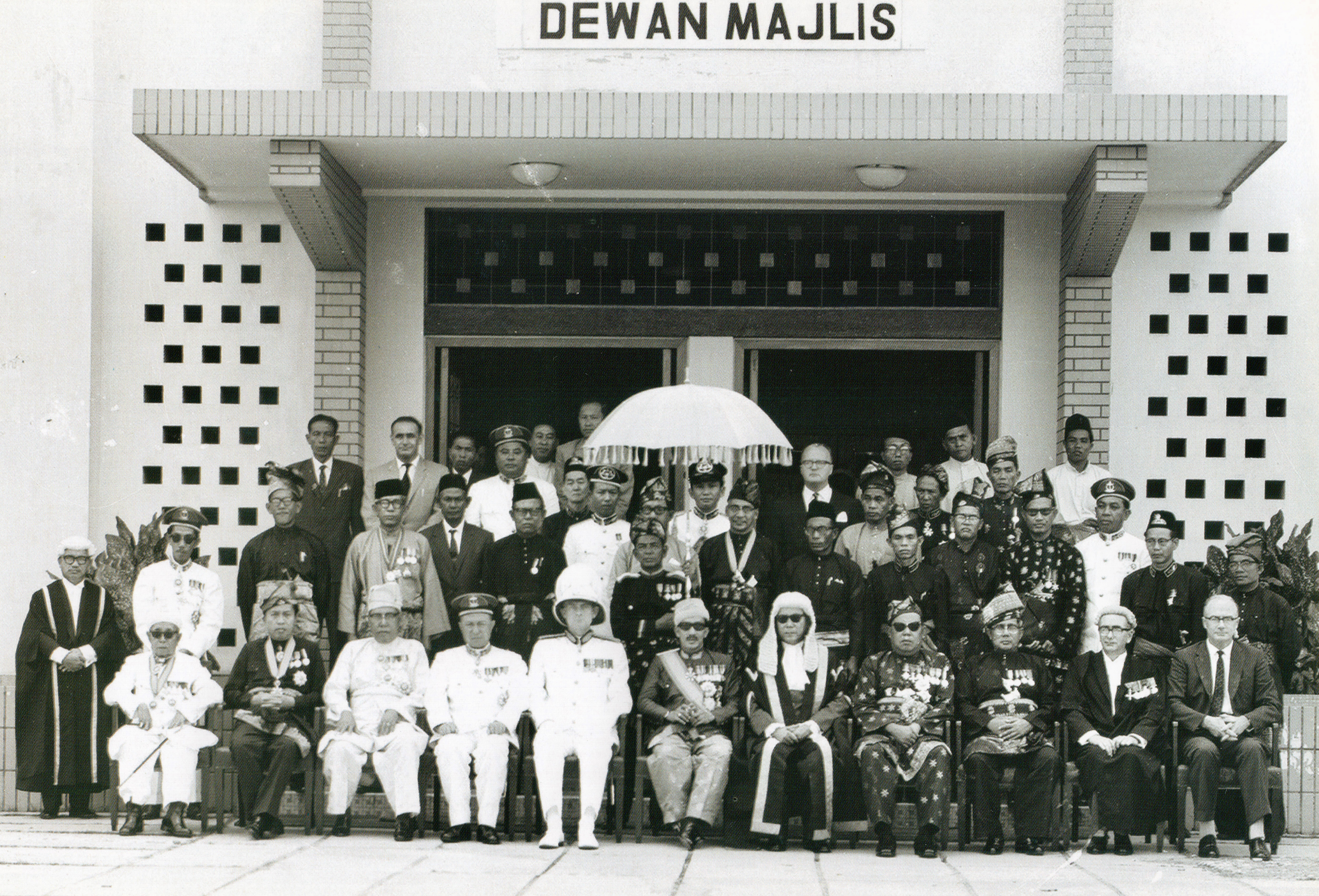
Lim (left of the umbrella) and other legislative councillors in 1963

Lim was part of a constitutional committee sent by Sultan Omar Ali Saifuddien III to London to discuss the ratification of Constitution of Brunei. His name appeared again on the list when the Privy Council was established the following year. Despite his lack of remuneration for these roles, he expressed satisfaction in supporting the sultan of Brunei. An important turning point in Brunei's political history was reached in 1959 when the nation and England agreed on a constitution for internal self-government. On 29 September of the same year saw the announcement of this new constitution. During the signing ceremony, he stood out as the only Chinese representative among the sixteen individuals led by the sultan.

His involvement in political matters extended beyond this event; he was also a signatory of the "Agreement Amending the 1959 Agreement" in 1971 with the British Government. On 7 January 1979, Lim was selected once again to represent Brunei in signing the " Treaty of Friendship on Co-operation," which ultimately paved the way for the nation's full independence in 1984. In addition to his political roles, Lim served as the Chinese marriage registrar and handled various governmental documents. He also founded the Guang Guan Company, which was run by his eldest son, Lim Ben Li. Furthermore, he was among five state dignitaries who attended the Melayu Raya Meeting in Kuala Lumpur from 6 to 8 January 1962, further illustrating his commitment to the nation’s political landscape.

== Political positions ==
According to Lim, if Chinese citizens want a happy, stable life, they should learn more Malay. He expressed his desire for more youths to learn the local tongue in 1972. He claimed that while most Chinese could understand a little Malay, very few were fluent speakers. In an hour-long conversation, he also expressed his desire for the country to place more attention on agriculture and the expansion or modernization of the capital's commercial district. He claimed that a capital should have at least 100 stores, but he didn't want a cluster of skyscrapers either. He believed that there was lots of open farmland that could be used to grow fruits and vegetables, and thus the country should lessen its reliance on foreign nations for its food supplies.

== Personal life ==
Along with his various accomplishments, Lim was an avid photographer who amassed a collection. He had many branded cameras and took pictures throughout the years. His wife, Ong Ming Xuan, died in 1962, leaving Lim and their six daughters and two boys. Even though he was becoming older, Lim stayed committed to his job and insisted on working three to four hours a day till his death in order to serve the Chinese community and his fellow citizens.

Lim was the company director of Chop Kong Guan in the city centre.

== Titles, styles and honours ==
=== Titles and styles ===
In the context of Brunei's governance, Lim noted that it is customary for the royalty to appoint three Chinese officials. Alongside Hong Kok Tin, who serves as Pehin Bendahara, Lim Teck Hoo holds the title of Kapitan Cina and ranks highest among them as Pehin Datu Temanggong, although it took two requests for him to accept this title. On 17 March 1951, Lim received the Manteri title Pehin Datu Temenggong Kurnia Diraja (later Pehin Datu Temenggong), referred to as Yang Dimuliakan in honorific, from Sultan Omar Ali Saifuddien III in recognition of his charity endeavors and noteworthy contributions to the area of education. His significance to the Bruneian government was further demonstrated in July 1969 when the presented him with the Order of Setia Negara Brunei Third Class.

=== Honours ===
Lim has earned the following honours;

- Order of Seri Paduka Mahkota Brunei First Class (SPMB) – Dato Seri Paduka
- Order of Setia Negara Brunei Third Class (SNB)
- Omar Ali Saifuddin Medal Second Class (POAS; 23 September 1959)
- Sultan Hassanal Bolkiah Medal (PHBS)
- Omar Ali Saifuddin Coronation Medal (31 May 1951)
