= Hong Kok Tin =

Bruneian businessperson and politician (1910–1989)

Yang Dimuliakan Pehin Bendahari Cina Kornia Diraja Hong Kok Tin SNB SLJ POAS
- 方國珍
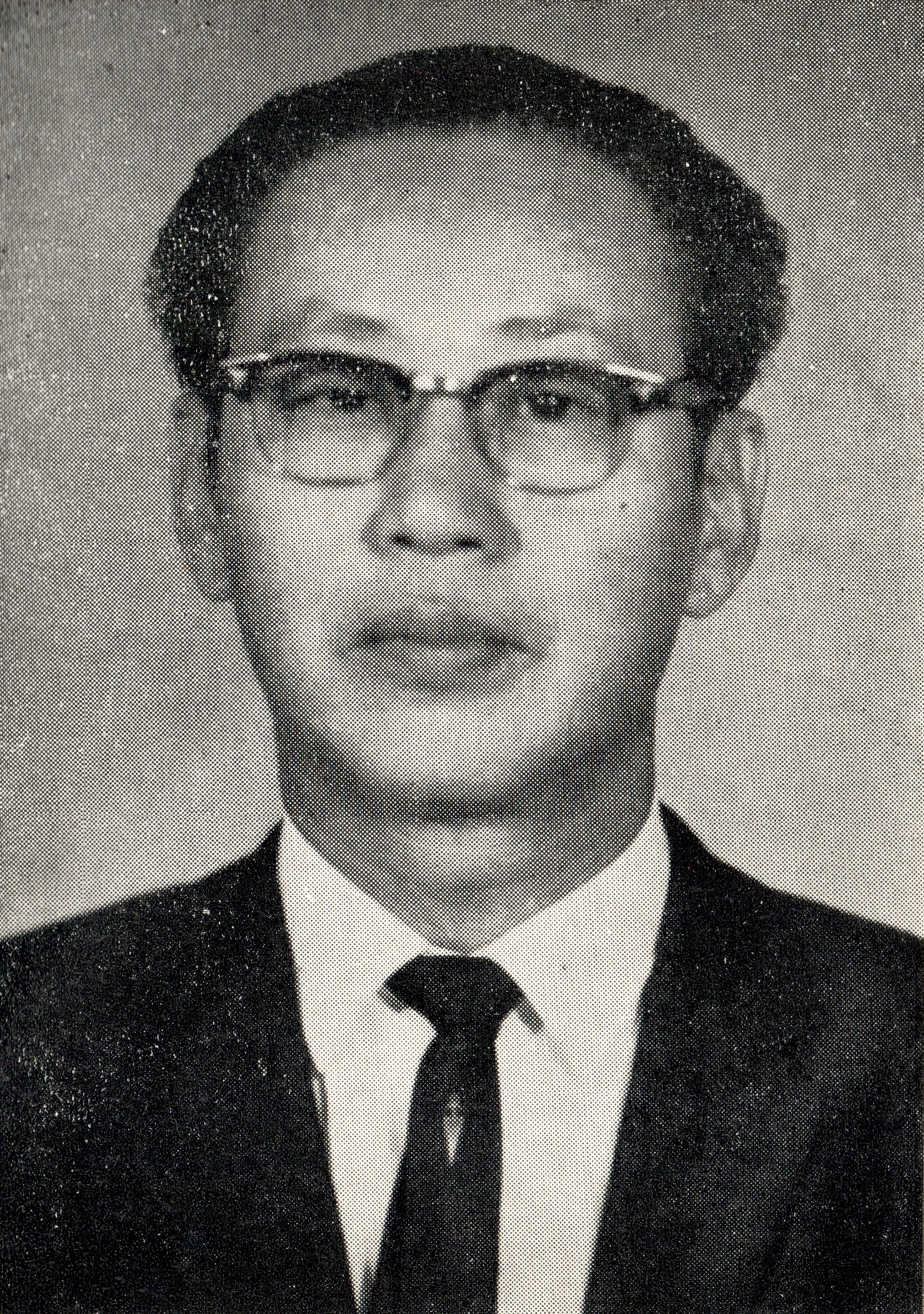
- Hong in 1968

Member of the Legislative Council
- In office 28 August 1963 – 12 April 1970

Personal details
- Born: 1910 Kingdom of Sarawak (present-day Malaysia)
- Died: 29 June 1989 (aged 78–79) Kuala Belait, Belait, Brunei
- Spouse: Chai See Moi
- Children: 9
- Occupation: Businessman; community leader; philanthropist; politician
- Profession: Politician; businessman

Chinese name
- Simplified Chinese: 方国珍
- Traditional Chinese: 方國珍
Transcriptions
Standard Mandarin
- Hanyu Pinyin: Fāng Guózhēn
Southern Min
- Hokkien POJ: Hong Kok-tin

Hong Kok Tin (Chinese: 方國珍; pinyin: Fāng Guózhēn; 1910 – 29 June 1989) was a Bruneian nobleman, businessman, philanthropist, and community leader of Chinese descent. He held influential positions as a member of both the Brunei Legislative Council (LegCo) and Executive Council. Additionally, Hong was the company director of Seng Hup Hin & Co. in Kuala Belait, where he contributed significantly to the local business landscape and community development.

== Early life ==
Born in Sarawak in 1910, Hong rose to prominence in Brunei despite lacking formal schooling. He began his career as an apprentice in a relative's bicycle business in Sibu, earning $3 a month in his first year, $5 in the second, and $7 in the third, a progression he recalled clearly. Over the years, he moved to Kuching, Miri, and Labuan, changing jobs and seeking career advancement. This journey is a familiar tale shared by many Henghua people from the Putian region of Fujian Province, mainland China, who travelled abroad in search of a better life. In 1929, after oil was discovered in the Belait District, the British Malayan Petroleum Company hired workers for the oilfields. In 1931, Hong arrived in Kuala Belait, then a fishing village growing into an oil town. He had seen firsthand how Miri, just 30 kilometres (19 mi) away, transformed into a bustling community after oil was discovered there in 1910, and he believed Kuala Belait would follow suit, attracting skilled workers and immigrants from places like British Hong Kong and Penang.

== Business career ==
Deciding to settle in Kuala Belait, he opened his first business, Chop Seng Hup Hin, selling bicycles and other imported goods. Business flourished for nearly three years until the Japanese occupation disrupted it. After the Japanese surrender, Allied bombers destroyed his shop along with those of other shopkeepers. Starting from scratch, Hong constructed makeshift shops from wood and palm leaves, re-establishing his bicycle trade and expanding into transportation by acquiring trucks and hiring twenty staff. This precarious situation continued until 1953, when the government provided new two-story concrete buildings in Jalan Pretty. In 1955, Marsal Maun called for Hong to be appointed as the registrar of Chinese marriages for Belait District. By 1960, Chop Seng Hup Hin had become a well-known company, selling Philips products, with its customers able to afford them thanks to the revenue from oil production. Philips became a household name, and according to a local businessman, "Being the sole distributor of Philips products, like radios and electrical appliances, was as prestigious as holding a franchise for high-end cars such as Humber Hawk, Singer Gazelle, Oxford, and Holden."

== Political career ==
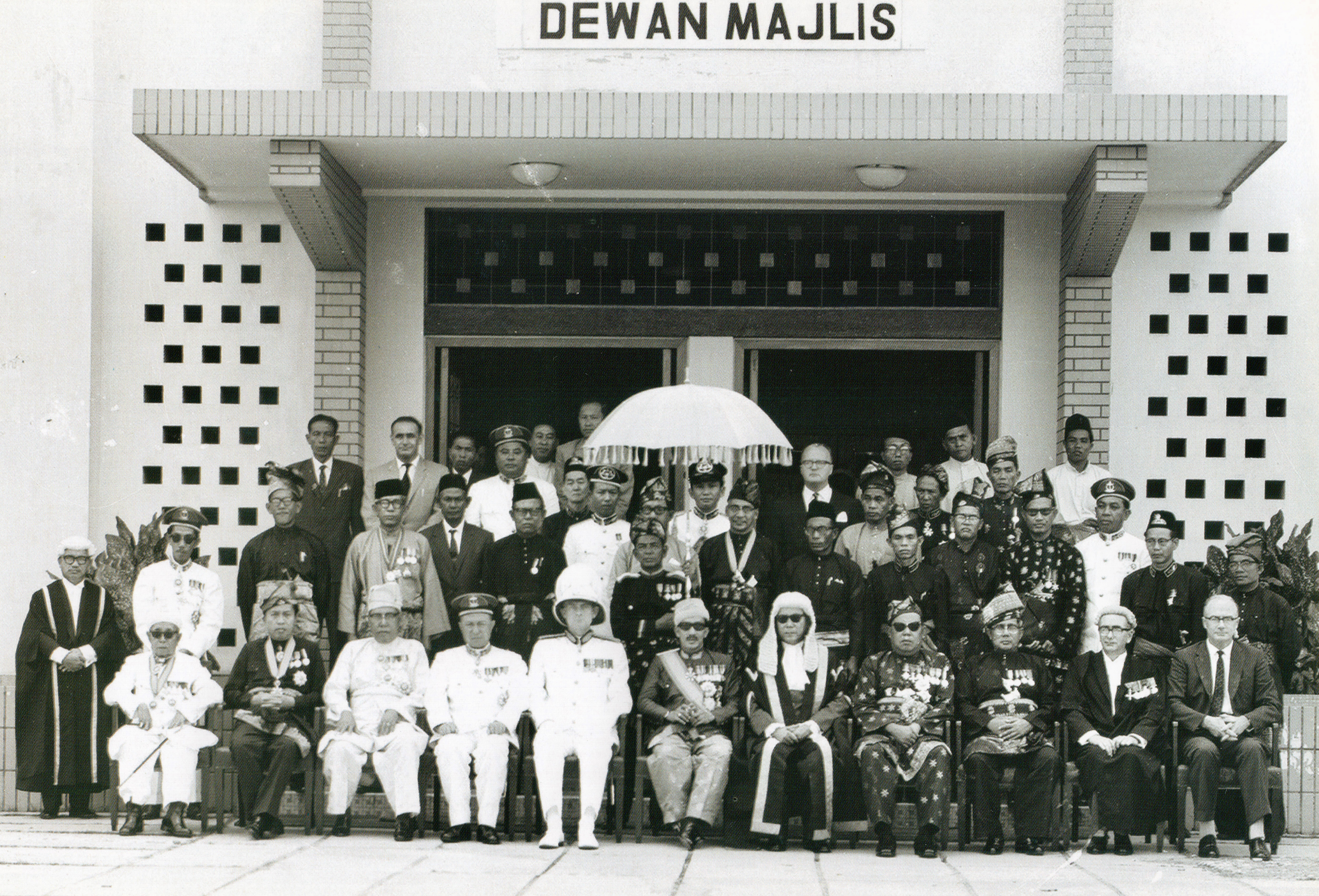
Hong (standing, 2nd from right) with other legislative councillors in 1963

In the 1960s, Sultan Omar Ali Saifuddien III appointed Hong to a position in the royal palace and bestowed upon him the title "Pehin Bendarhari China Kornia Diraja" as a reward for his contributions. This was a significant and unforgettable moment for Hong and the residents of Belait District, marking the beginning of a new chapter in Hong's journey towards his goals. The title was a great honour in Brunei, especially for someone of Chinese ethnicity, and Hong became the first person from Belait District to receive it. While the title came with privileges, it did not confer authority unless the holder was also appointed to one of the five influential councils established by the 1959 Constitution.

In 1962, following the sultan's address to the LegCo, Hong was appointed to a committee tasked with gathering public opinion on Brunei's potential merger with the proposed Federation of Malaysia. Representing the Chinese community, Hong served alongside members from other communities, such as A. M. Azahari, Gimang Anak Perait (Iban), Lukan Uking (Dusun), and Hashim Tahir (secretary). The committee, chaired by Menteri Besar Marsal, reflected Brunei's multi-ethnic society. After the Emergency Executive Council was disbanded in July 1963, Hong was appointed to both the Legislative and Executive Councils. On 14 June 1965, he was named assistant head of medical and health services, with an official residence in the capital, as one of four junior ministers under Brunei's new ministerial system. Hong remained in this position until 1970.

Despite his achievements, some critics argued that Hong failed to support the "stateless" Chinese, who had been in Brunei since the time of the British Resident, in their quest for citizenship. In 1967, Hong announced the commencement of construction projects for modern hospitals in Brunei Town, Kuala Belait, and Tutong, and advocated for salary increases for medical and health workers.

== Other works ==
Hong's philanthropic contributions to education in Brunei, particularly to the Chinese community, were significant and enduring. After the war, he played a key role in reviving Chung Hwa School, which had miraculously survived the bombing. In 1955, Hong was elected chairman of the school's management committee, overseeing the construction of a modern double-storey building with government aid of B$80,000, a substantial amount at the time. The new school building was completed in 1956 and officially opened by the sultan. Under Hong's leadership, the school’s student population grew from about 600 to nearly 900, and it became the first Chinese school in the district to offer secondary education. Hong continued his commitment to the school’s development, overseeing the construction of a second building in 1967 at a cost of $500,000. In recognition of his outstanding contributions, Hong was honoured as the school's permanent honorary chairman in 1971. His efforts not only supported the educational advancement of Chinese children but also helped foster the stability and progress of the Belait District’s Chinese community.

Apart from his contributions to education, Hong was deeply involved in various clan associations. In the mid-1950s, he was selected by the British Resident to serve on the Belait District Chinese Affairs Advisory Committee, created to mobilise local community leaders to assist in managing Chinese affairs and offer advice when necessary. The committee, which included prominent members like T. S. Sung, the principal of Chung Hwa Middle School, provided valuable support. In 1951, when Kapitan-China Shen Ren Shi proposed the founding of the Chinese Chambers of Commerce for Kuala Belait and Seria, Hong was the first to respond positively. He became a founding promoter of the chamber when it was formally established in 1955. Hong also held honorary positions in numerous schools, clubs, and associations. In 1969, he further demonstrated his support for Brunei's heritage by donating a suit of samurai armour to the Brunei Museum for educational display.

== Personal life ==
Hong was married to Chai See Moi (蔡细妹), and the couple had two girls and seven sons.

Hong died on 29 June 1989.

== Titles, styles and honours ==
Hong was bestowed the title of Manteri Dagang, Pehin Bendahari China Kornia Diraja, by Sultan Omar Ali Saifuddien III on 24 May 1960, with the honorific Yang Dimuliakan. Lim Cheng Choo notes that it is a custom of the Brunei monarch to appoint three Chinese officials, citing Hong Kok Tin as Pehin Bendahara and Lim Teck Hoo as Kapitan Cina, as two examples. In addition to this, Hong received several other honours throughout his life.

- Order of Setia Negara Brunei Third Class (SNB; 1970)
- Order of Setia Negara Brunei Fourth Class (PSB)
- Order of Paduka Seri Laila Jasa Third Class (SLJ)
- Omar Ali Saifuddin Medal (POAS)
