= Lim Teck Hoo =

Bruneian businessperson and philanthropist (1910–1999)

Yang Dimuliakan Pehin Datu Temanggong Dato Paduka Lim Teck Hoo DPMB POAS PHBS PJK
- 林德浦
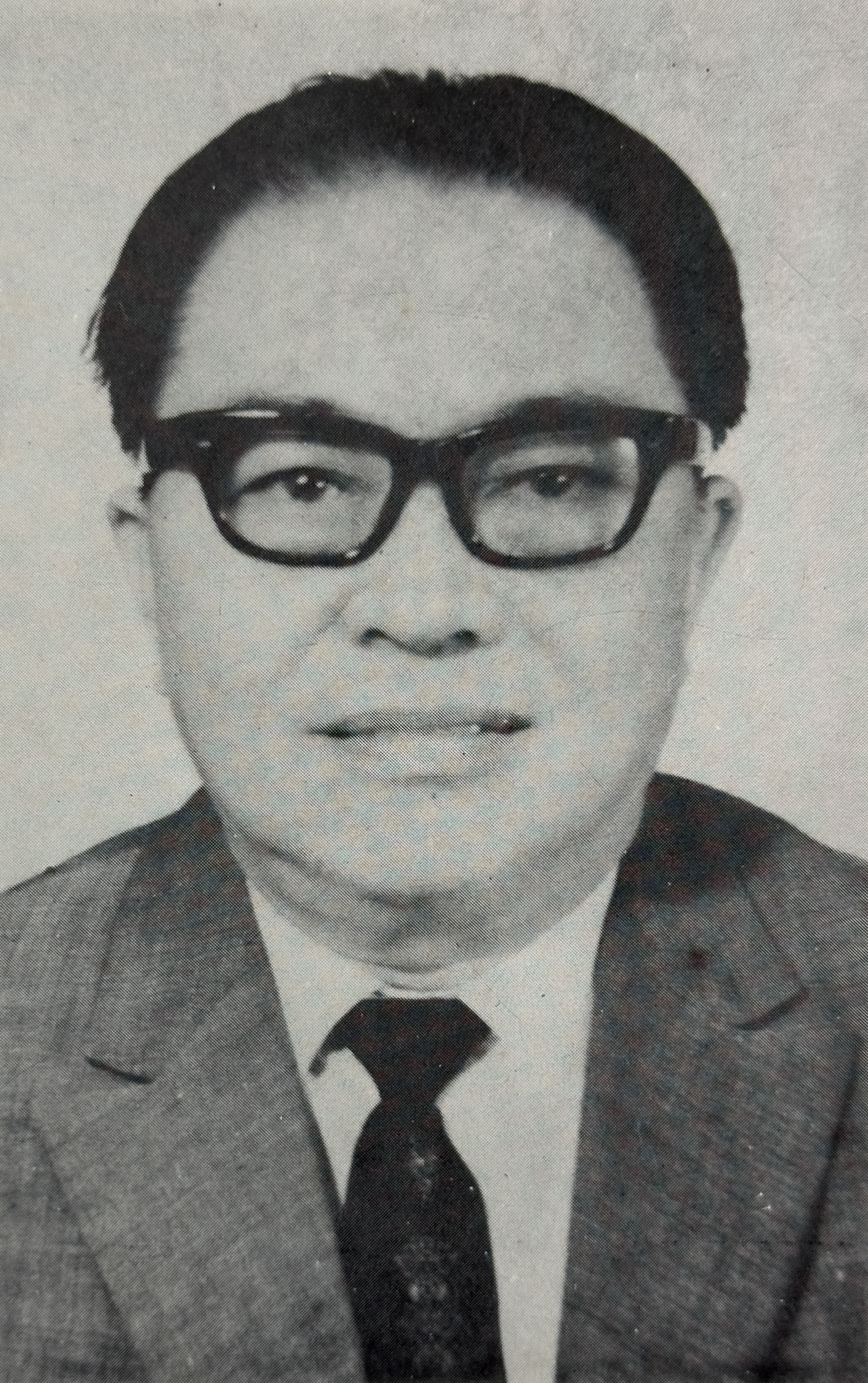
- Lim, c. 1972
- Born: Lim Teck Hoo; 1910; Lieyu, Kinmen, Republic of China
- Died: 13 March 1999 (aged 88–89); Bandar Seri Begawan, Brunei
- Resting place: Lim Teck Hoo Memorial Park, Brunei–Muara, Brunei; 4°51′51″N 114°56′39″E
- Occupations: Businessman; philanthropist
- Organizations: Lim Teck Hoo Holdings; Bee Seng Shipping
- Spouse: Ang Moi Tee (m. 1934)
- Honours: See here

Chinese name
- Traditional Chinese: 林德浦
Transcriptions
Standard Mandarin
- Hanyu Pinyin: Lín Dépǔ
Southern Min
- Hokkien POJ: Lîm Tek-phó͘

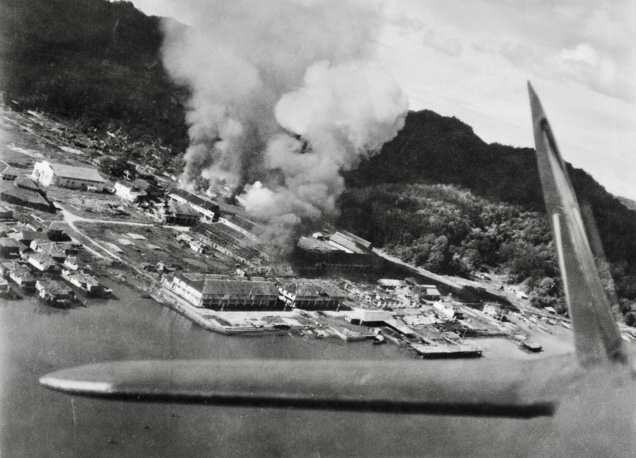
Brunei Town under attack by an Australian Beaufighter aircraft in 1945

Lim Teck Hoo (Chinese: 林德浦; pinyin: Lín Dépǔ; 1910 – 13 March 1999) was a Bruneian aristocrat, businessman, and philanthropist who played a pivotal role in shaping Brunei's commercial and educational landscape. Known for his pioneering contributions to business and philanthropy, he transformed the Chinese community's educational opportunities, serving as chairman of Chung Hwa Middle School, Bandar Seri Begawan (CHMS, BSB), for 43 years and overseeing its development into the largest Chinese school in the country. Beyond education, he contributed to Brunei's post-war rebuilding efforts, founding several organisations such as Lim Teck Hoo Holdings and Bee Seng Shipping, and played an instrumental role in establishing community institutions like the Teng Yun Temple.

== Early life ==
Lim Teck Hoo was born in 1910 in Kinmen, Taiwan, to a farming family. His father, Lim Zhao Ying, died when Lim was only nine years old, leaving his mother, Tan Poi, to raise him and his sister. She supported the family by making and selling clothes and shoes. Lim, being a dutiful son, helped his mother by selling her goods during the day while continuing his studies at night. Despite his difficult upbringing and lack of financial means to attend school, Lim showed resilience. At the age of seventeen, with the help of relatives, he traveled to Brunei and began working as a laborer at his relative's Chop Leong Soon store in Brunei Town, earning $12 a month.

In 1938, Lim returned to Brunei with his wife, mother, and daughter, ready to start a new chapter. Together with two relatives, he established a supply shop named Chop Bee Seng in the heart of Brunei Town. The business quickly flourished, and Lim soon became the sole owner. His shop traded essential commodities such as rubber, pepper, palm sugar, raw tobacco, and staple foods, which were vital to the local community. Through his keen understanding of the commercial landscape and hard work, Lim successfully grew his business, becoming a prominent figure in Brunei's trading industry.

== Career ==
After being married in his homeland of Kinmen in 1934, Lim took his spouse back to Brunei, where he and his companions co-founded Chop Bee Seng. Lim sent money to anti-Japanese groups during the Japanese occupation in 1942, which resulted in his detention and questioning by the Japanese. A Japanese businessman named Xiong Qi Ying saw Lim's potential and worked to negotiate his release, saving his life. Lim made a deal with the military attaché to provide hand-rolled tobacco cigarettes and local dessert (kuih muih) during the Japanese occupation in 1945. Lim moved his family to Kampong Sinarubai for protection after the Allied forces extensively attacked Brunei Town.

Lim relocated his family once more when the Japanese forces left, this time to Kampong Saba in Kampong Ayer. Lim kept up his presence in the local business community during the difficult times by continuing to manage his grocery store in Brunei Town in spite of these moves. Despite lacking a formal education, Lim became the sole proprietor of Chop Bee Seng after the war, and his company quickly expanded globally. He founded You Li Hong in Singapore in 1962 and became an agent for Yeo's, a well-known brand of canned food and drink items that became quite famous in Brunei.

Lim acted quickly to capitalise on the shipping of bakau (Rhizophora apiculata) to Hong Kong, where there was a fuel shortage and bakau was used by the locals for cooking, following the surrender of the Japanese. This firm only ceased operations when firewood was replaced by gas and electricity. He purchased enormous rubber plantations spanning thousands of acres in Temburong and Limbang during the Korean War, when the price of rubber skyrocketed four or five times, making a fortune by exporting rubber to Singapore.

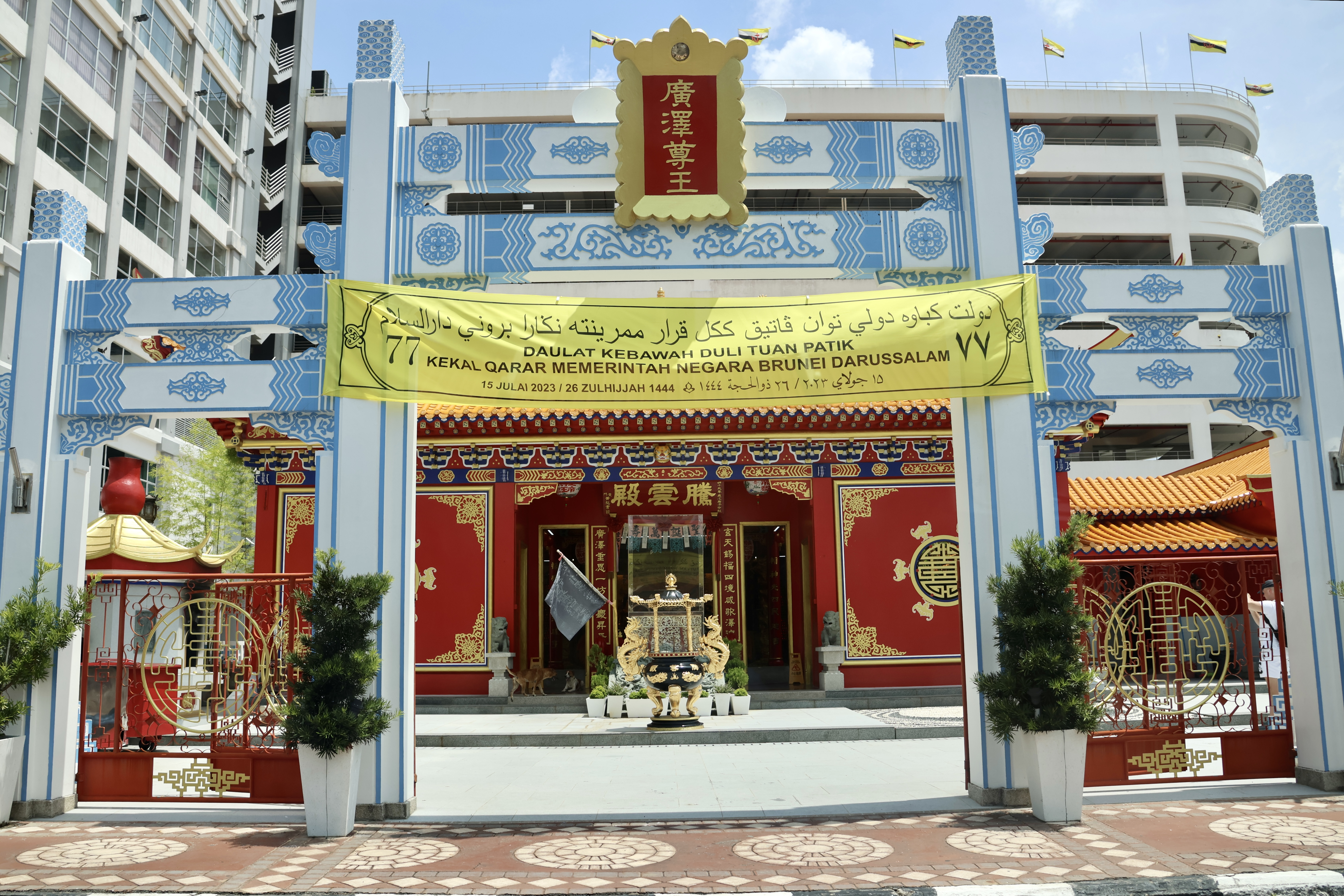
Teng Yun Temple in 2023

Lim and a few others initiated the establishment of the Tengyun Hall Construction Committee in 1953 as a result of the government's confiscation of land. He was named head of the Construction Committee, and as soon as the committee was formed, its members started a significant fund-raising initiative. Tengyun Temple was reconstructed in 1958, utilising land granted by Sultan Omar Ali Saifuddien III, finished in 1960 and inaugurated by the British resident Sir Dennis Charles White, and later given the official name Tengyun Hall thanks to the donations from the population.

In 1962, Lim Teck Hoo founded You Li Hong in Singapore, representing the renowned Yeo's brand of tinned food and drinks, which quickly gained popularity in Brunei. His commercial ventures expanded in 1970 when he established a share trading limited company in Taiwan, allowing him to import a variety of goods, including raw materials, food products, artwork, steel, and cement. Lim also founded Bee Seng Shipping Limited Company in Hong Kong, specialising in the purchase and export of wholesale ready-made garments to international markets, and he served as chairman of the Overseas Chinese Trust Group, a subsidiary of the World Overseas Chinese Banking Corporation he co-founded in Taiwan. Although his family is no longer involved in the rubber trade, their former rubber estates have become valuable real estate for development. After the bombing of Brunei Town, Lim entered the construction and building materials industry by establishing Soon Lee Brickworks, the first clay brick manufacturer in Brunei, which remains operational today as Hup Soon Brickworks Ceramic. He played a key role in the reconstruction efforts by importing the first cargo of cement from Taiwan for Bandar Seri Begawan. Additionally, Lim founded Bee Seng Shipping in 1958, making it Brunei's first local shipping company, and actively participated in community activities organized by Tiong Hua.

Lim, who brought in knowledge from Taiwan, began farming in 1968. He produced a range of cash crops for the local market with the assistance of more than a hundred Taiwanese farmers. Additionally, he helped the State Store dehusk the padi that the nearby farmers in Sengkurong supplied. He acquired six boats for these uses, monopolised the import of "Fortune" cement from the Philippines in 1972, and participated in the construction of Muara Port, Brunei International Airport (BIA), and the Brunei LNG (BLNG) facility in Lumut.

He entered the quarry industry, situated at Km 5, Jalan Tutong (present day Taman Damuan). The quarry was moved at Km 8, Kampong Madewa, in 1975. He started building homes along Jalan Padang after realising there was a lack of suitable accommodation. The older homes he had constructed were razed in 1988 to provide room for towering flats that the Bruneian government was rented out. Lim went back to Taiwan to make investments in 1975. He was one of the founders of World Overseas Chinese Banking Corporation and was chosen in 1988 to serve as chairman of the bank's subsidiary, Overseas Chinese Trust Group.

In the evening of 21 March 1996, Fujian residents of all ages were called to a meeting by Lim to discuss the formation of the Brunei Fujian Association. He argued that the younger generation should be responsible for the preparatory work, while the older residents should play the role of support and consultation.

As the head of the Chinese community in Brunei, it was his responsibility to make sure they followed the rules and laws of the nation and made contributions to the advancement of the Sultanate. He was tasked with carrying out study and investigation into issues pertaining to these topics in order to provide advice to the Sultan. He established Lim Teck Hoo Holdings on 6 December 1994, and named his kids and grandkids as the board of directors. Since then, company has donated $80,000 a year to Chinese schools to support their growth.

== Philanthropy ==
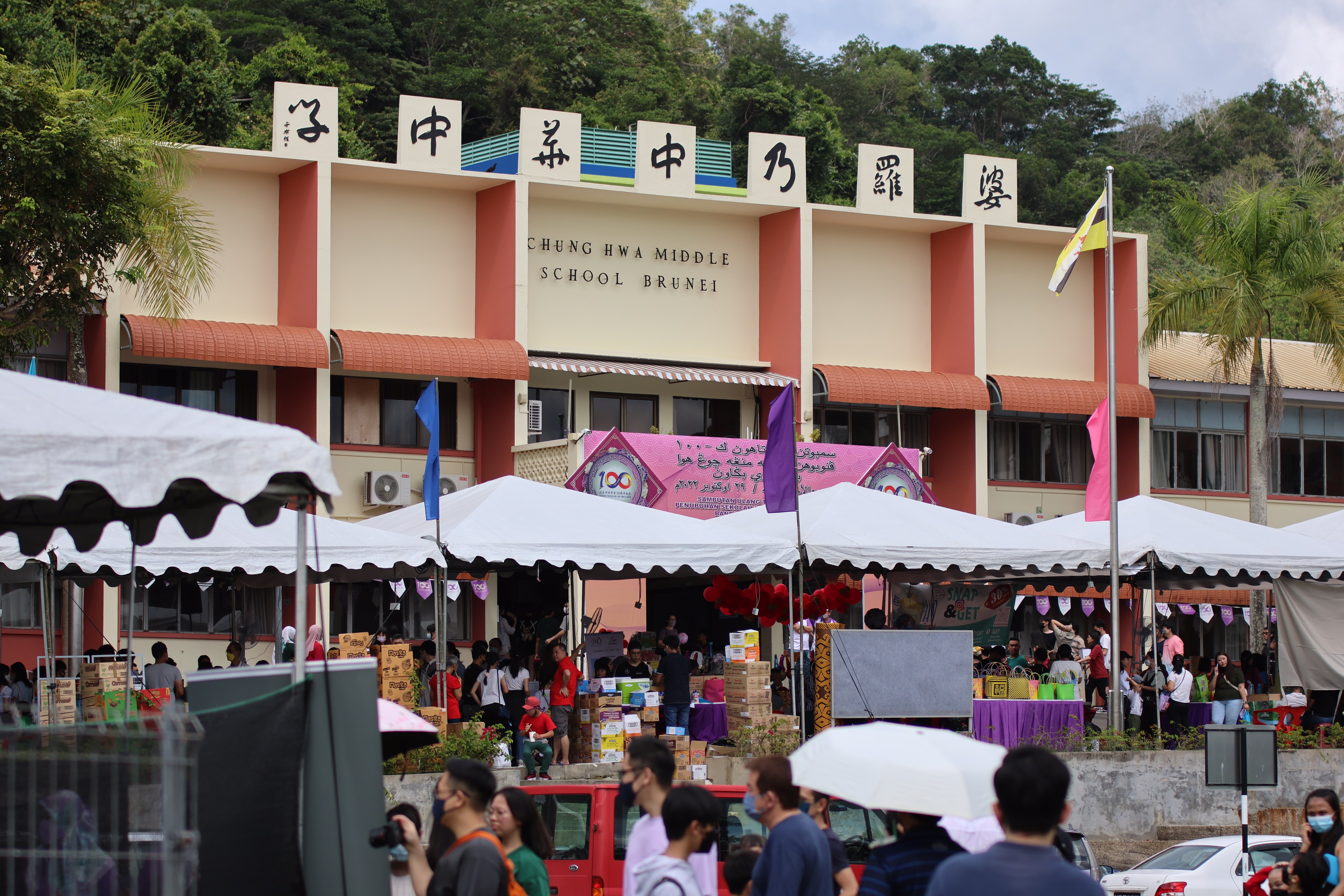
Chung Hwa Middle School, Bandar Seri Begawan in 2022

Since 1958, Lim Teck Hoo had served as a voluntary arbitrator for the Chinese community, helping to resolve numerous disputes through out-of-court settlements. A dedicated Taoist-Buddhist, he played a key role in the establishment of Brunei's largest Chinese temple, the Tokong Cina Temple, located in the heart of the capital. Remarkably, this temple survived the devastation of World War II and still stands today, preserving its original grandeur. Lim was also instrumental in founding the first Chinese school in Brunei, the CHMS, BSB, where he served as chairman for forty-three years from 1954.

Under his leadership, CHMS grew significantly, evolving from a primary school to include secondary education and becoming the largest Chinese school in Brunei. He spearheaded numerous projects to expand the school, personally donating substantial amounts of money to fund these developments. Chung Hwa Middle School in Bandar Seri Begawan, Chung Ching Middle School in Seria, Chung Hua Middle School in Kuala Belait, Pai Yuek School in Temburong, Chung Hwa School in Tutong, Chung Hwa School in Labi, Chung Lian School in Sungai Liang, and Chung Hwa School in Kiudang were among the schools where he was most active in charitable and community projects.

Financial constraints arose in 1970 when the government withdrew its financial support for the school, but Lim, along with other board members and the Tiong Hwa Community, resolved this issue by offering monthly donations. After overseeing the institution for over 40 years, he retired as chairman in 1996. In honour of his contributions, the Pehin Temenggung Dato Lim Teck Hoo Building was completed and dedicated on 6 January 2008. During his leadership, the school expanded by adding classrooms to accommodate students from preschool through pre-university, solidifying its status as the largest Chinese school in Brunei.

As of 2016, the Lim family has continued the tradition of supporting Chinese education and culture nationwide, donating to Chinese chess associations and schools for the past two decades. Lim Teck Hoo Holdings has contributed a total of B$80,000 annually to Chinese schools. Following in their father's footsteps, Lim's children donated $50,000 to eight Chinese schools in the Sultanate and an additional $2,000 to the Brunei Chinese Chess Association on 20 October 2016. The family has maintained this commitment through similar contributions in 2018 and 2022. In addition to his dedication to Brunei's public affairs, Lim also made generous donations to several ancestral temples in Lieyu and established the Lim Teck Hoo Scholarships to support local children in their academic pursuits. He also initiated the Lin Depu Cup Asia-Pacific Primary School Mathematics Olympiad to encourage educational excellence.

== Death ==
Lim died on Saturday, 13 March 1999. At the time of his death, he left behind a wife, five sons and nine daughters. He is buried at his own personal memorial park along Jalan Kasat, Kampong Kasat. Following his death, his son, Dato Paduka Lim Beng Thai, took over the company's business operations, carrying on his father's profession, and holding a significant position in Brunei's local and international commercial sector, with the help of his sisters and brothers working together. Chinese Ambassador Wang Haitao attended the late-nobleman's qingming ceremony on 6 April 2022.

== Personal life ==
Lim is married to Datin Ang Moi Tee. Together they gave birth to Lim Beng Thai, Lim Beng Cheng, Lim Ming Kiat, and Lim Ming Siong.

== Titles, styles and honours ==
=== Titles and styles ===
Lim was bestowed the Manteri title of Yang Dimuliakan Pehin Datu Temanggong on 11 May 1996, promoted from title of Pehin Kapitan China Kornia Diraja on 12 August 1958. Lim Cheng Choo claims that the Brunei Royalty has a tradition of designating three Chinese officials, mentioning Lim Teck Hoo, who portrays Kapitan Cina, and Hong Kok Tin, who is Pehin Bendahara, as the other two.

=== Honours ===
Lim has been bestowed the following honours;

- Order of Seri Paduka Mahkota Brunei Second Class (DPMB; 15 July 1989) – Dato Paduka
- Order of Seri Paduka Mahkota Brunei Third Class (SMB; 15 July 1982)
- Omar Ali Saifuddin Medal (POAS; 23 September 1961)
- Sultan Hassanal Bolkiah Medal First Class (PHBS; 12 February 1969)
- Meritorious Service Medal (PJK; 23 May 1998)
