= Chung Hua Middle School, Kuala Belait =

Private school in Brunei

Chung Hua Middle School
- 中華中學; Sekolah Menengah Chung Hua (Malay) سکله منڠه چوڠ هوا (Jawi)
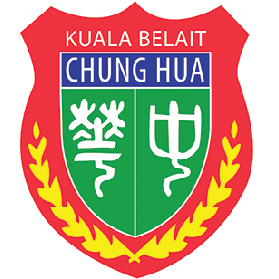

Location
- Jalan Bunga Rambai; Kuala Belait, Belait District, KA1131; Brunei
- 4.5820770°N 114.1926714°E

Information
- Former name: Chung Hua School (1931–1949); Chung Hua Kuala Belait (1949–1957)
- Type: Private
- Motto: 礼, 义, 廉, 耻 (Courtesy, Righteousness, Honesty, Integrity)
- Founded: 1931; 95 years ago
- Chairman: Lau Shiew Yuen
- Administrator: Koh Ngee Hoon
- Principal: Chong Kui Kian
- Deputy Principal: Felicia Nicholas / Kong Yun
- Gender: Coeducational
- Houses: 4
- Affiliations: CIE
- Website: Official Instagram
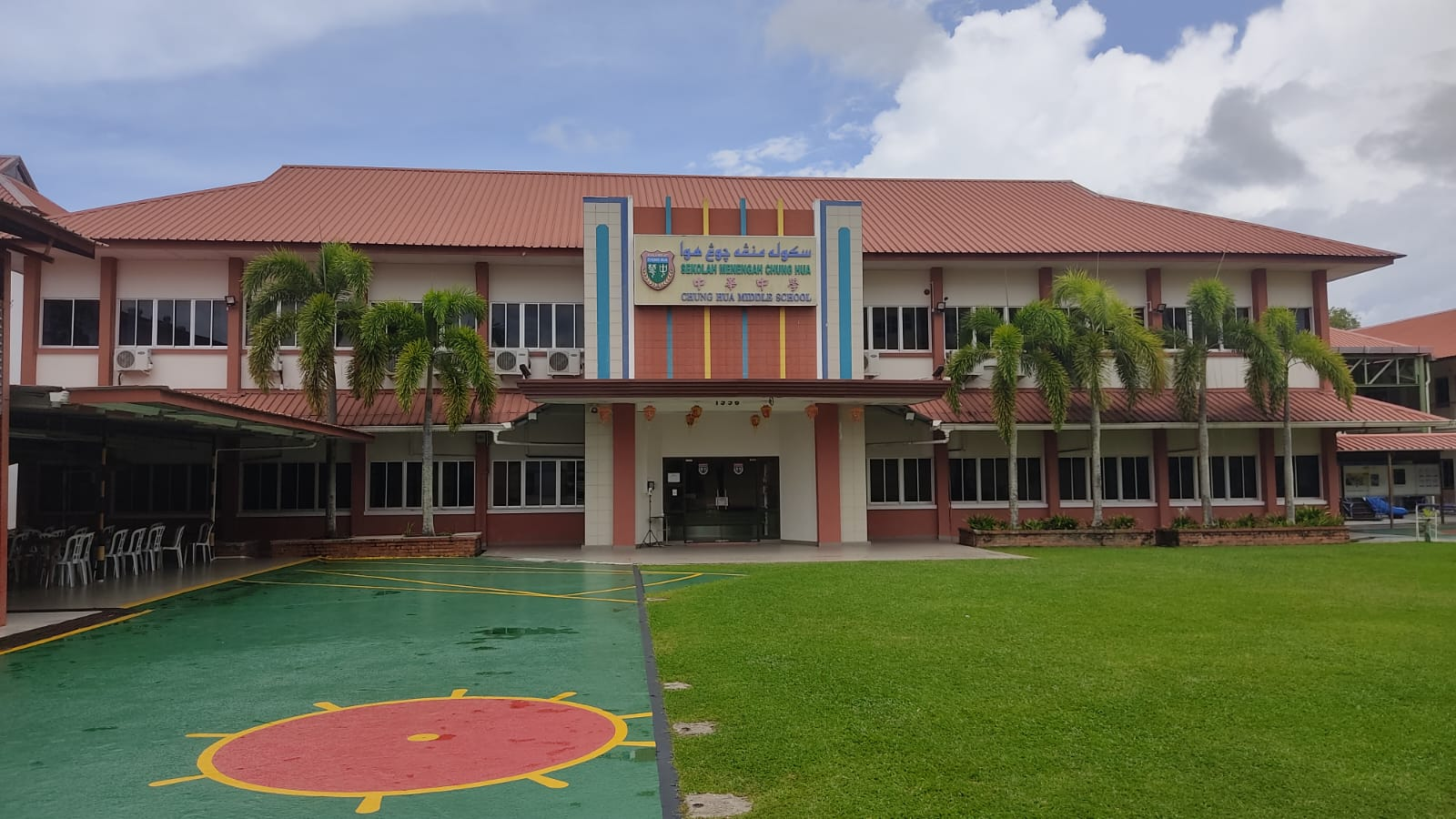
- Administration Building

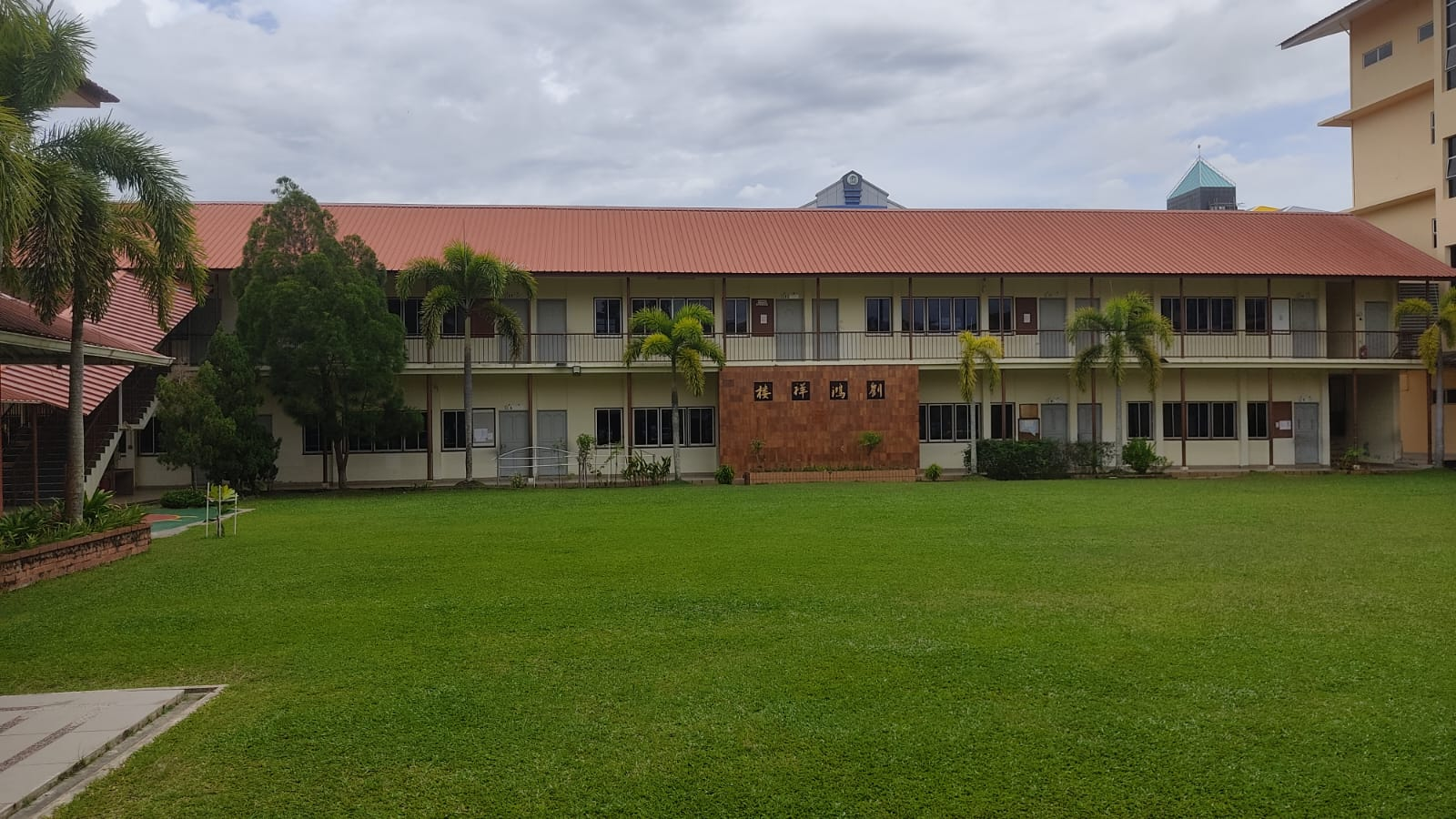
- Lau Hong Siong Building

Chinese name
- Simplified Chinese: 中華中學
- Traditional Chinese: 中華中學
Transcriptions
Standard Mandarin
- Hanyu Pinyin: Zhōnghuá Zhōngxué
Southern Min
- Hokkien POJ: Tiong-hôa Tiong-ha̍k

Chung Hua Middle School, Kuala Belait (CHMSKB; Malay: Sekolah Menengah Chung Hua, Kuala Belait, Chinese: 汶萊馬來奕中華中學), is a private school in Kuala Belait, Belait District, Brunei Darussalam. In 1987, it was estimated that 39,000 of the Brunei's total population (222,000), was Chinese.

== History ==
=== 1930s–1940s ===
The Chung Hua School was officially established in 1931 and later relocated in 1933, to its current location. During World War II, the school was suspended by the Japanese during their campaign in 1941, for three years. After the end of war in 1945, a school named Pei Zhen was merged with Chung Hua School. In 1947, the school acquired an annual monthly grant-in-aid of B$50 from the state. It was not until 1949, where the school was officially approved by the Education Department, to be named Chung Hua Kuala Belait.

=== 1950s–1970s ===
In 1950, Chung Hua came first place in the Belait District's Interschool Football Competition, and later again in 1952, the school alongside Brunei Town Malay School came out as the finalist. The school had a major upgrade in 1955, and later in 1956, the school was officially opened by the Sultan Omar Ali Saifuddien III. The name Chung Hua Middle School only came in 1957, when the school's lower secondary classes were implemented. The school's 2nd block was completed in 1967. Moreover, the following multi-purpose hall was built in 1974 but it only lasted four years, in which a fire destroyed the hall alongside the teachers' hostel. The Lau Hong Siong building was completed in 1979, followed by the reconstruction of the multi-purpose hall in 1981.

=== 1980s–2000s ===
Upper secondary classes were introduced in the year after. Three more buildings were constructed throughout the 1990s, science building in 1996, 2nd block of Lau Hong Siong building in 1997 and finally with the classrooms added underneath the science building. Also by that year, the school has 123 pupils, and the Lim Teck Hoo Holdings was established in which it annually donated B$80,000 to Chinese schools in Brunei. An estimated 637 hectares of tree cover was lost within school grounds from 2001 until 2021.

=== 2010-2020s ===
Secretary and representative from the Taipei Economic and Cultural Office in Brunei visited the school on October 16, 2019. On April 16, 2021, B$100,000 worth of gym and sport equipments were donated to four schools in Brunei including Chung Hua by Wu Chun. On January 12, 2020, a new hostel was opened in the school. The school's principal led a visit to the National Changhua University of Education in 2020, and on November 30, the Chinese Embassy to Brunei donated books to both Chung Hua and Chung Ching Middle Schools.

On July 21, 2021, three of the biggest Chinese schools in the country, Chung Ching Middle School, Chung Hua Middle School and Chung Hwa Middle School took part in an Interschool Chinese Speech Contest. As of August 21, later that year, the school had one of the largest COVID-19 clusters in the district and went on to assist the Ministry of Health (MoH) in controlling the outbreak.

== See also ==
- List of schools in Brunei
- Kuala Belait
- Education in Brunei
