= Ong Boon Pang =

Bruneian businessperson (1882–1940)

Pehin Kapitan China Ong Boon Pang
- 王文邦
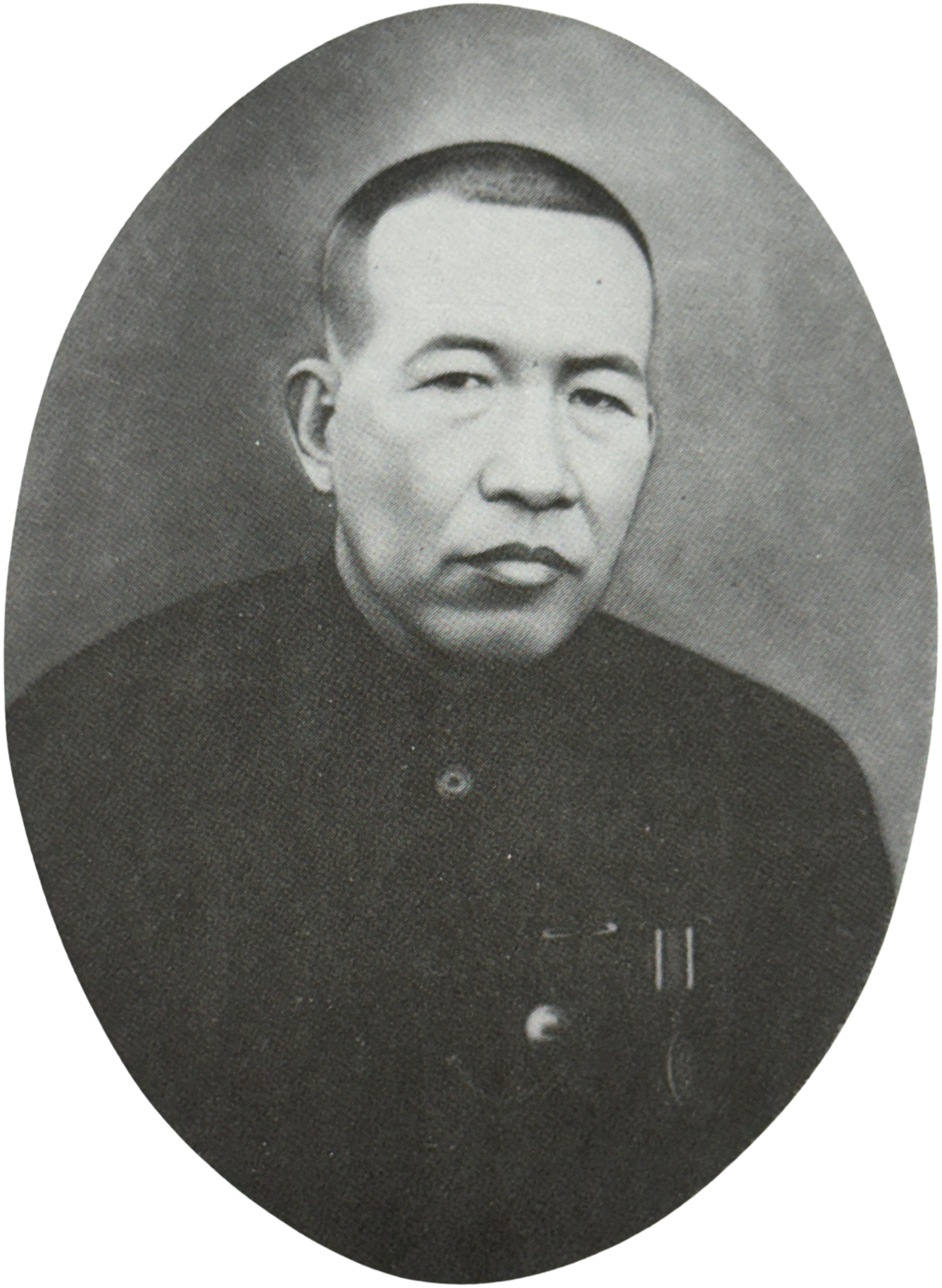
- Born: 1882; Lieyu, Kinmen, Qing Empire
- Died: 14 January 1940 (aged 58)
- Occupation: Businessman
- Known for: Founder of Chung Hwa Middle School, Bandar Seri Begawan and the first Bruneian Kapitan Cina
- Spouse: Tay Giok Lian
- Children: Ong Kim Kee
- Relatives: Lim Cheng Choo (son-in-law); Timothy Ong (grandson)

Chinese name
- Simplified Chinese: 王文邦
Transcriptions
Standard Mandarin
- Hanyu Pinyin: Wáng Wénbāng
Southern Min
- Hokkien POJ: Ông Bûn-pang

Ong Boon Pang (Chinese: 王文邦; pinyin: Wáng Wénbāng; Pe̍h-ōe-jī: Ông Bûn-pang; 1882 – 14 January 1940) was a Bruneian aristocrat, businessman, and Kapitan Cina who made important contributions to the Chinese community, especially in the areas of education and urban planning. He was dedicated to education, as evidenced by his efforts in establishing Chung Hwa Middle School, Bandar Seri Begawan, the country's first Chinese school. He organised the Overseas Chinese Mutual Help Association, serving as its president and providing support to local Chinese residents in their daily lives.

== Early life and education ==
Ong Boon Pang was born in 1882 in Lieyu village, Kinmen County, Qing Empire. At the age of eighteen, he left his hometown to seek a livelihood, first sailing to Singapore and then to Brunei the following year. At that time, Brunei was still undeveloped and sparsely populated, with a national population of fewer than 20,000, including only a few hundred Chinese residents. The capital city, Brunei Town, had just one street lined with scarce thatch-roofed shops, and the majority ethnic group, the Malays, lived in Kampong Ayer made up of wooden houses on stilts along the rivers. He started his small business from scratch, operating a wooden boat along the river to sell various goods. Over the years, he became a familiar face in the community, recognised as a Chinese merchant who provided essential groceries to local households.

== Business career ==
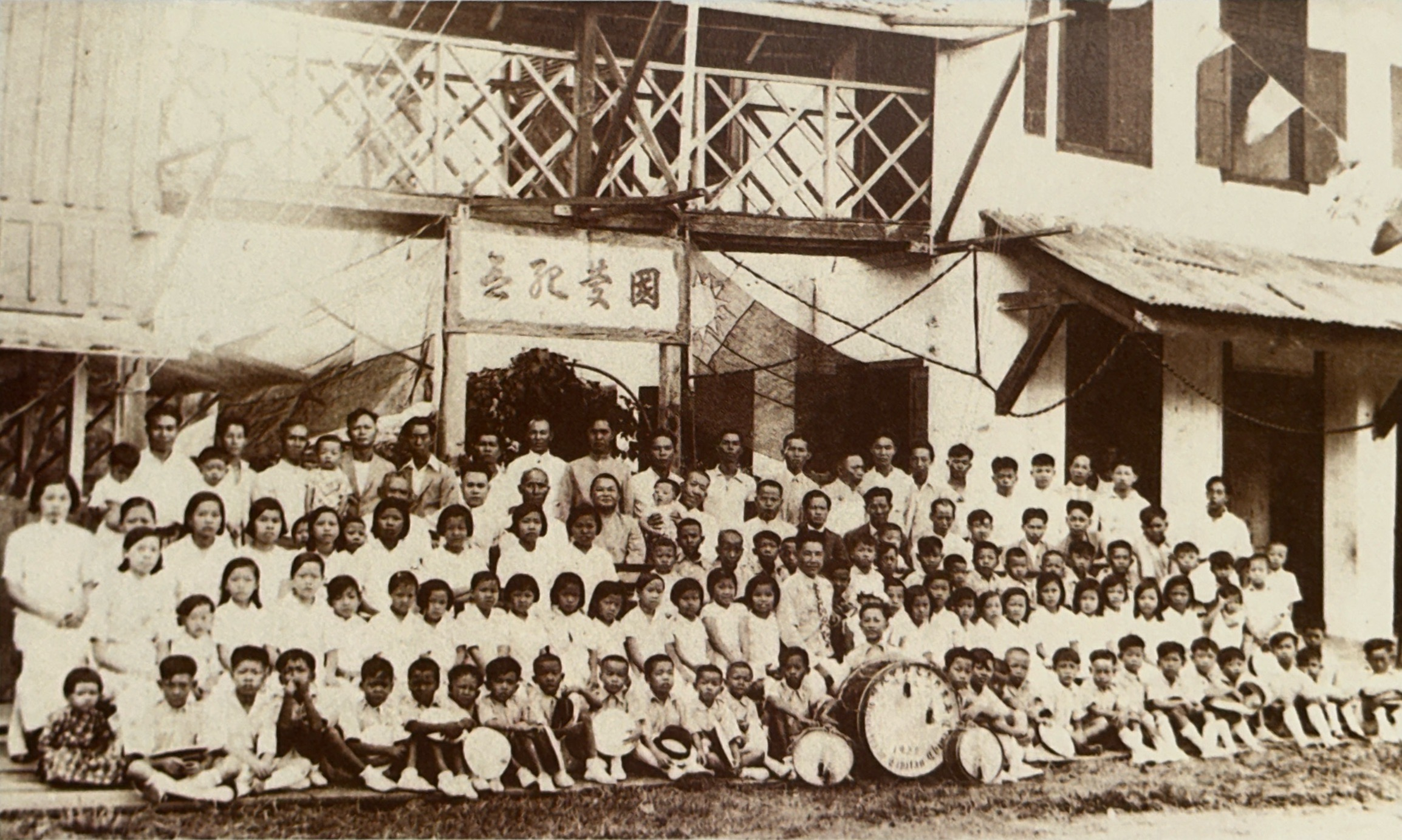
Ong (centre, holding a child) with students and staff of Chung Hwa School in 1934

Ong founded Chop Teck Guan, a company that specialised in regional goods, after years of perseverance and hard labour. Later, he ventured into retail and wholesale, selling gasoline and distributing foreign cigarettes, among other things. Because of being closeness to the Brunei River, the capital's sole street regularly flooded in the 1930s. Ong was one of the contractors participating in the land reclamation project that the Bruneian government started, which gave him the opportunity to amass a sizeable fortune. He opened five stores as his enterprises prospered, including the still-open Teck Leong Pawnshop. After establishing his funds, he opened Boon Pang Cinema in 1939 to offer the locals amusement. The movie theatre was reconstructed in 1953 after being destroyed during the Japanese occupation, but it was damaged once more in 1960.

There was no Chinese school in Brunei at the beginning of the 20th century, so Ong organised more than thirty of his friends to start York Choi School, which subsequently changed its name to Chung Hwa School in 1922. At first, the group of around twenty pupils attended courses in temporary classrooms within a rented shophouse since there was no official school facility. In 1937, Ong led a fundraising campaign to build a new school as enrollment increased. Donations poured in after he promised to match every dollar given by nearby companies. As a result, the school was given permanent space on Jalan Bendahara when a two-story building was finished a year later. Having worked at the school for twenty-two years, he served as chairman or chief management from 1918 until his death in 1940.

== Personal life ==
Ong died from kidney illness as a result of his lifestyle and an extended period of overexertion. He drafted a will on his deathbed, leaving four close family members to handle his assets until his sons were old enough to take over, while his children were still small. His first son-in-law, Lim Cheng Choo; his second son-in-law, Yap Chong Teck; his brother-in-law, Lim Soo Jin; and his second wife, Tay Giok Lian, were among these relations. On 14 January 1940, Pehin Kapitan Ong died at the age of fifty-eight. After taking over his father's companies, his second son, Ong Kim Kee, became a prosperous businessman himself after being influenced by his father's principles. He is the grandfather of Timothy Ong, who currently serves as the acting chairman of the Brunei Economic Development Board.

== Titles ==
Ong's substantial contributions to the city's growth, his kind support of education, and his aid to the poor were recognised by the Bruneian government. On 18 March 1936, Sultan Ahmad Tajuddin recognised his achievements by appointing him to the State Council of Brunei and granting him the Manteri title of Pehin Kapitan China in 1932, which designates him as a Kapitan Cina. He was the first Chinese person in Brunei to be recognised with this title.
