= Benny Ong =

Benny Ong (born 1949) is a Singaporean fashion designer and textile artist.

His fashion work is produced under his own label, The Ong, which is sold in Bloomingdale's and Bergdorf Goodman in New York City, and throughout Europe. Ong has also designed uniforms for the British Airports Authority, British Telecom, Raffles Hotel in Singapore, and he has remodelled the clothes of security staff at leading hotels in Beijing, ahead of the 2008 Summer Olympics. His private clients have included Princess Diana, the Duchess of Kent, Queen Noor of Jordan, and Shakira Caine. Ong is a graduate of London's Central Saint Martins and is a founding member of the London Designer Collections.

In the early 2000s, Ong made the switch from fashion designing to contemporary textile art. In 2007, he presented the exhibition Re-woven at the Singapore Art Museum. It comprised 46 pieces of silk textiles based on the art of Lao weaving. In 2015, Ong received the Singapore Design Golden Jubilee Award. In January 2016, Ong, in collaboration with a family of master Laotian weavers, presented The Pioneering Spirit at Raffles Hotel, an exhibition of 21 woven textiles, including the S$10,000 "The Shirt", featuring Lee Kuan Yew in his iconic white shirt in the shape of Singapore.

== Awards ==
Ong was awarded the Singapore Design Golden Jubilee Award 2015 by DesignSingapore Council.
