= Ong Kim Kee =

Bruneian businessperson (1931–1998)

Dato Paduka Ong Kim Kee DPMB PHBS
- 王金纪
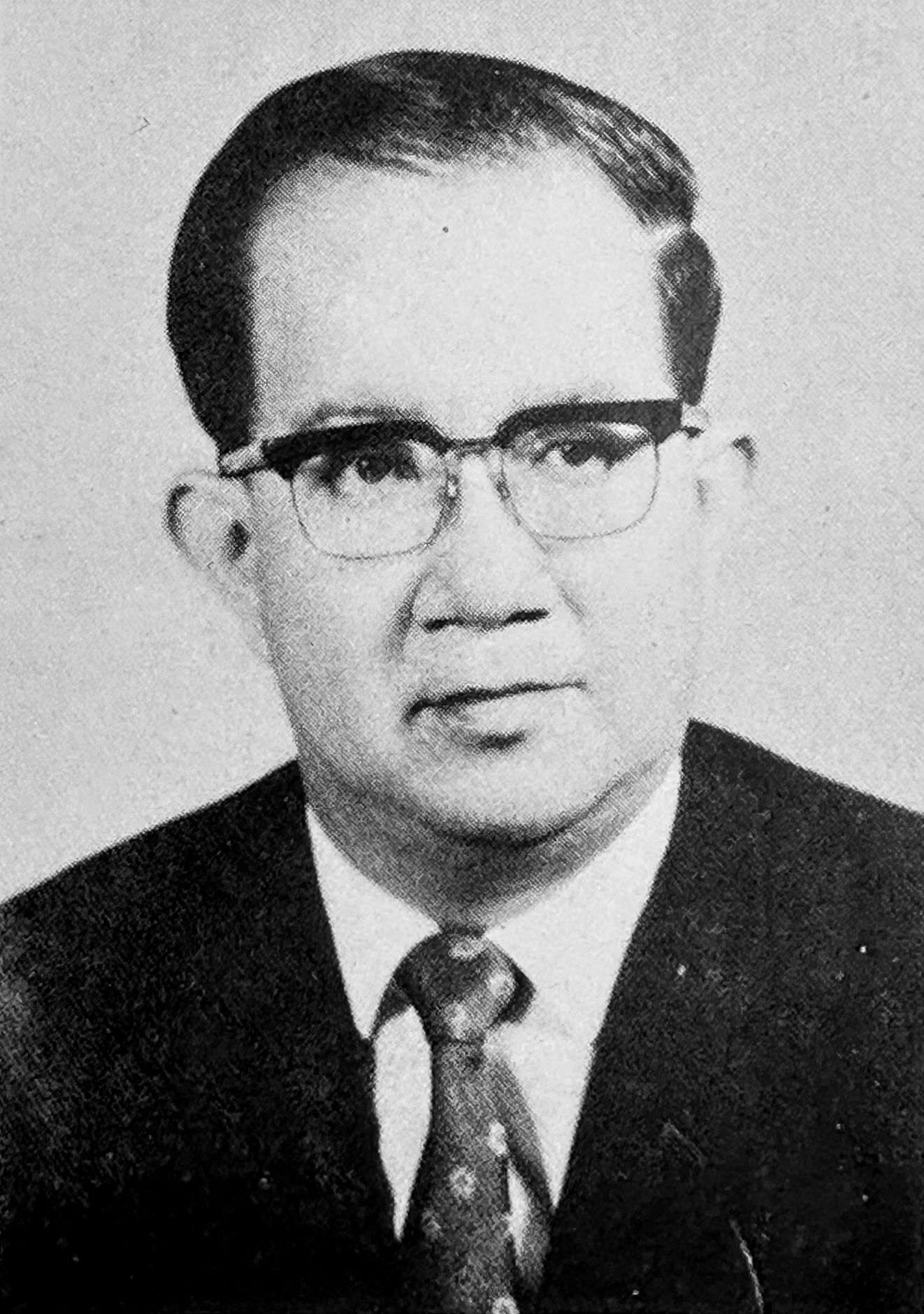
- Ong, c. 1972
- Born: 24 June 1931
- Died: February 1998 (aged 66)
- Education: Chung Hwa School; Chinese High School
- Occupations: Businessman; philanthropist; community leader
- Known for: Chairman of the boards of St. Andrew's School and Chung Hwa Middle School, Bandar Seri Begawan
- Spouse: Doris Kong Siuk Yin
- Children: 4; including Timothy Ong
- Father: Ong Boon Pang
- Relatives: Lim Cheng Choo (brother-in-law)

Chinese name
- Simplified Chinese: 王金纪
- Traditional Chinese: 王金紀
Transcriptions
Standard Mandarin
- Hanyu Pinyin: Wáng Jīnjì
Southern Min
- Hokkien POJ: Ông Kim-kí

Ong Kim Kee (Chinese: 王金纪; pinyin: Wáng Jīnjì; Pe̍h-ōe-jī: Ông Kim-kí; 24 June 1931 – February 1998) was a Bruneian businessman, philanthropist and community leader known for his transformative contributions to the Chinese community, particularly in education and commerce.

He expanded his family business, Chop Teck Guan, into the Teck Guan Holdings, establishing it as one of Brunei's conglomerates. He is also celebrated for his dedication to education, serving as chairman of the boards of St. Andrew's School (SAS) and Chung Hwa Middle School, Bandar Seri Begawan (CHMS, BSB), and for his instrumental role in elevating the Chinese Chamber of Commerce (CCC), including leading the development of its headquarters.

== Early life and education ==
Ong Kim Kee was born on 24 June 1931, (Note: According to some sources, Ong Kim Kee was born in the Chinese province of Fujian, in the village of Lieyu, Kinmen, Taiwan and, along with his father, moved to Brunei in the early 1930s. However, other sources state that his father arrived in Brunei as early as 1906, leading to some contradictions in the historical accounts.) as the second son of Ong Boon Pang, a distinguished community leader.

His father had co-founded Chung Hwa School in Brunei, where he began his education. He faced early hardships, losing his mother at the age of two and his father when he was just nine. Following his father's passing in 1940, Ong took over the leadership of Chop Teck Guan, a company his father had founded. Despite his youth and lack of experience, he received mentorship from his brother-in-law, Lim Cheng Choo, who was married to his eldest sister.

Under his leadership, the company, which was involved in import and export, cigarette distribution, retail petrol, shop rental, and Bong Pang Cinema management, flourished. After World War II, he continued his studies in Singapore at the renowned Chinese High School, where he graduated in 1948 with a junior middle school diploma. His education was supported by several notable individuals, including Wee Cho Yaw, who accompanied him during the school registration process.

== Career ==
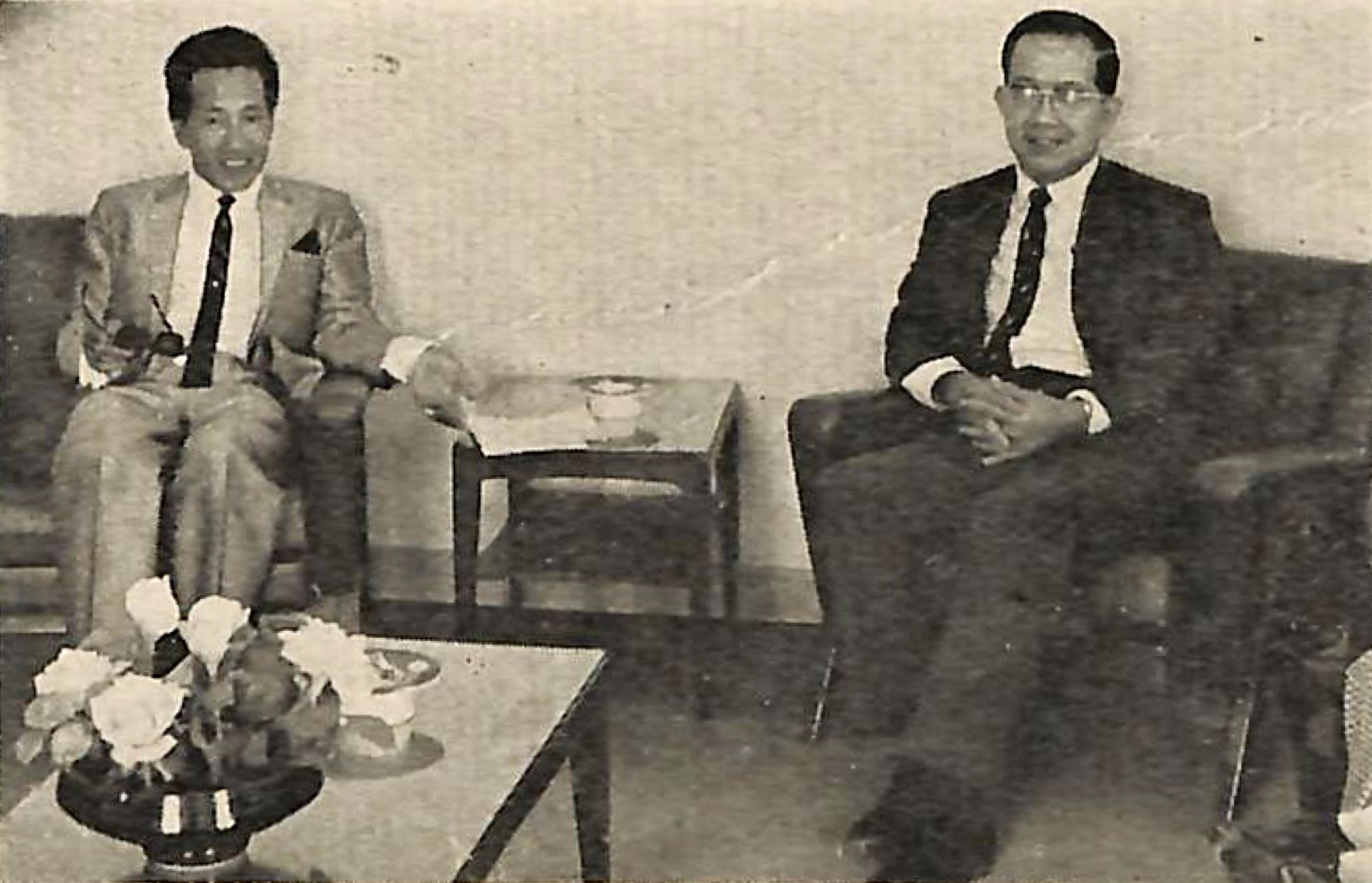
Pengiran Damit (left) and Ong (right) pictured just before they departed for Kuala Lumpur in 1967

Ong's commitment to education began in the 1950s, particularly through his support for CHMS and the establishment of SAS in Brunei Town, present-day Bandar Seri Begawan. On 12 May 1958, he was among ten residents of the town who had the opportunity to fly in Borneo Airways' Twin Pioneer aircraft.

At the 1959 annual meeting of the Brunei Amateur Athletic Association, Ong was named its president. He wrote to the state marine officer on 29 Oct 1966, about Brunei Town Wharf's congestion and the recommendation that a government-sponsored port user committee be established.

He struggled with kidney failure since the 1970s and relied on a dialysis machine. He devoted over 30 years to improving SAS, serving as chairman of the board. He began a 4-day visit to Manila on 8 Mar 1978, with the goal of enhancing bilateral trade and joint ventures.

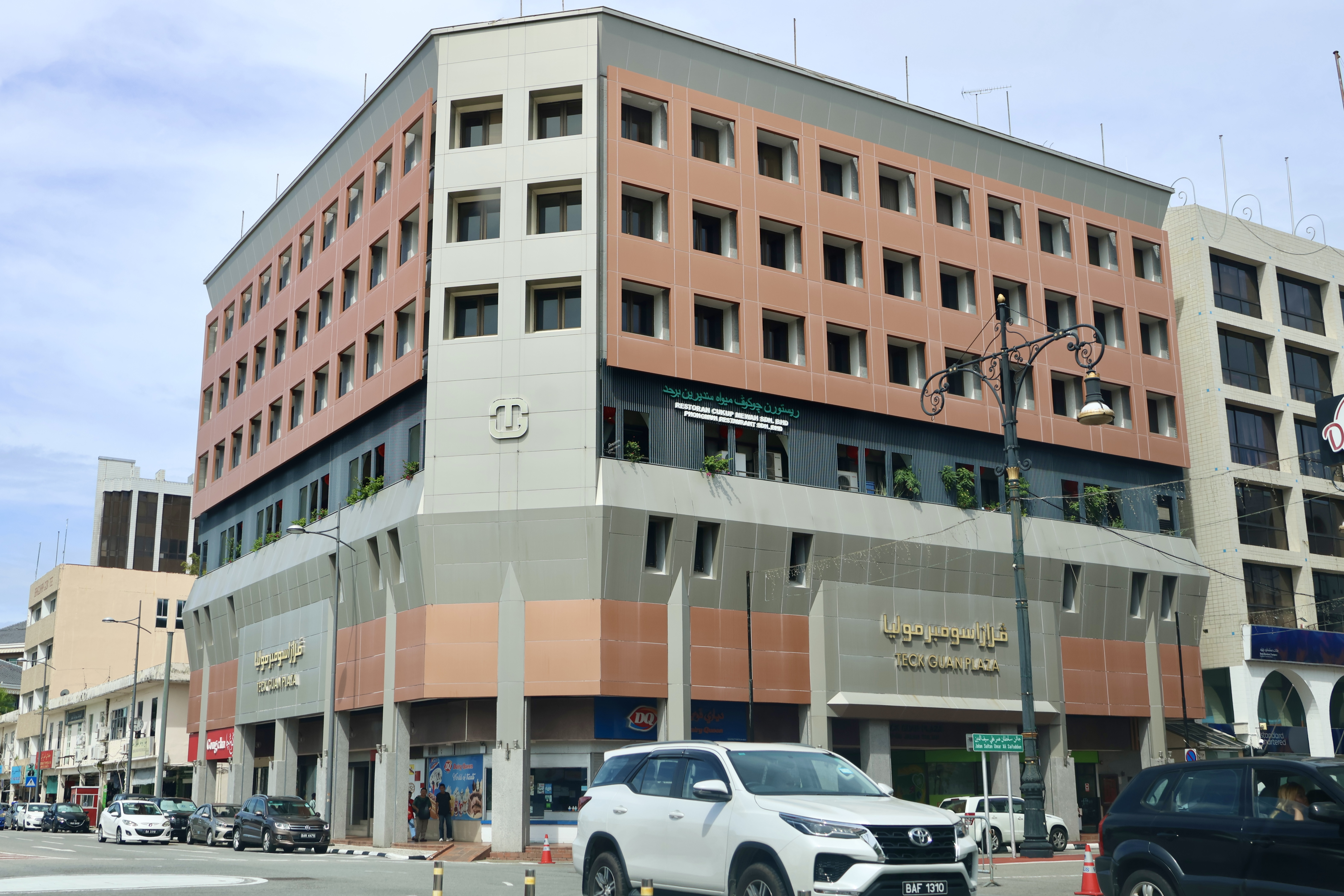
Teck Guan Plaza in 2025

In the early 1980s, he made a donation of B$150,000 towards the construction of the staff dormitories and administrative buildings at CHMS. In recognition of his contributions, one of the teacher hostels was named "Dato Ong Kim Kee." Around this time, he underwent a kidney transplant in Australia. In the 1980s, as his children returned home from studying abroad, he oversaw the construction of the Teck Guan Building, which became the administrative centre for Teck Guan Holdings. He worked from his office on the top floor, and the building still stands on Jalan Sultan in Bandar Seri Begawan.

In addition to his educational efforts, Ong was deeply committed to advancing the Chinese community and fostering trade in Brunei. He held significant long-term roles on the board of the CCC in Bandar Seri Begawan, where he played a key part in improving trade relations between Brunei and other countries, while also elevating the profile of Chinese merchants internationally. In 1974, in recognition of his outstanding contributions to society, Sultan Hassanal Bolkiah conferred upon him the title of "Dato Paduka."

In the early 1990s, while serving as president of the CCC, Ong conceived the idea of raising funds for a new building. He led the fundraising efforts and made a significant personal donation, which sparked an out-poor of support. The event raised a record-breaking total of $1,530,000, marking the largest fundraising effort ever by the Chinese community in a single event. His vision was realised in 1992 with the completion of the new CCC building. After serving as president for two more years, he continued his involvement as honorary president and adviser from 1995 until his death.

== Later life and death ==
In addition to his business and community contributions, Ong played an active role in national celebrations. As an entrepreneur and leader, he was asked to chair the Chinese Community Committee for the sultan's birthday celebrations in 1996 and 1997, overseeing the organisation and coordination of the events.

Ong died in February 1998. He was a devoted Christian, and is survived by his wife, Doris Kong Siuk Yin, and their three sons and one daughter. His son, Timothy Ong Teck Mong, is also a business and community leader.

== Legacy ==
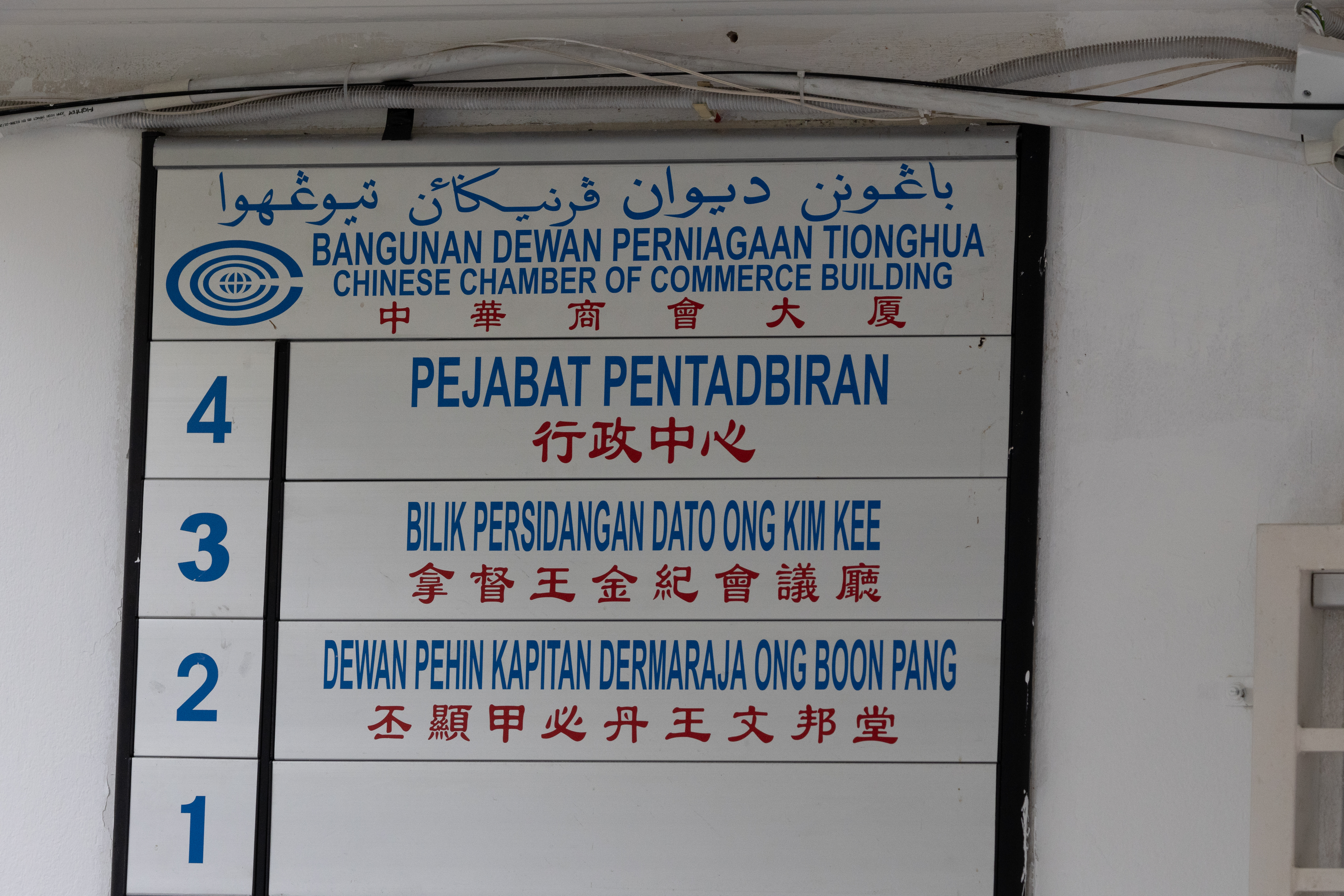
Dato Ong Kim Kee Hall at the CCC building in 2024

A book was a biography published posthumously in 2004, commemorating his life and contributions, named Ong Kim Kee: In loving memory. Selangor: Perniagaan Yakin.

=== Honours ===
- Order of Seri Paduka Mahkota Brunei Second Class (DPMB; 1974) – Dato Paduka
- Sultan Hassanal Bolkiah Medal (PHBS)

=== Things named after him ===
- Dato Ong Kim Kee Hall, located at the CCC of Bandar Seri Begawan.
- Dato Ong Kim Kee Hall, located at SAS, Bandar Seri Begawan.
