= Melissa Ong =

American TikToker (born 1993)

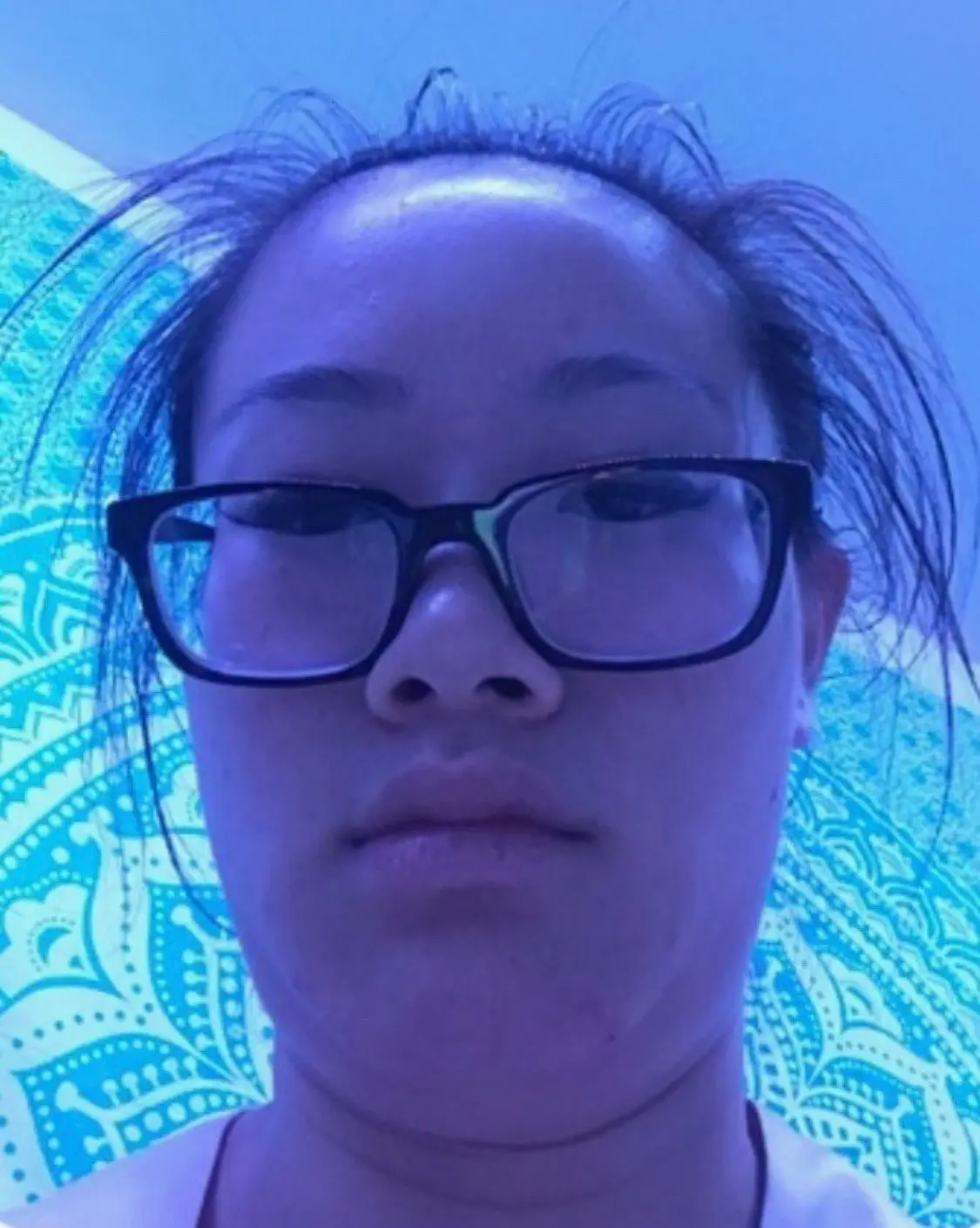
- Selfie of Ong, commonly replicated by the Step Chickens (see below)
- Born: Melissa Ong; May 25, 1993 (age 32)
- Occupation: Internet personality

TikTok information
- Page: sailormel69420
- Followers: 3.9 million
- Last updated: May 11, 2025

Melissa Ong (born May 25, 1993), (Note: See video content and title notes on Ong, Melissa (May 8, 2020). My birthday is on the 25th. #fyp #famousbirthdays.) known by her TikTok username chunkysdead and nickname Mother Hen, is an American Internet influencer, TikToker, YouTuber, and former user experience designer. She worked at several technology companies before leaving her job to focus on making videos for the social network TikTok. Ong is best known for the "Step Chickens," a self-described online cult formed after Ong released a TikTok video in a chicken costume satirizing tropes in pornography. The Step Chickens are more akin to a cult of personality or fandom than a harmful or violent cult; their main activities include spamming the comments sections of other creators, changing their profile pictures to match a selfie taken by Ong, and conversing on an app rebranded for them by Ong's friend and former co-worker.

== Early life and career ==
Ong grew up wanting to become a YouTuber; she has said that her ultimate goal is to have a comedy show on HBO or Netflix in the style of Nathan for You.

In an essay for Business Insider, Melissa Ong writes that she attended the University of California, Berkeley. She then went to work in the tech industry, interning for Cisco and Adobe before going to work for Yahoo! and later Google. Ong writes that she disliked both jobs; after suffering a mental breakdown while working at the latter company, Ong drafted her resignation letter and submitted it. By the time she left, Ong had already achieved her first viral video on TikTok, and was beginning to focus more on the platform.

== Internet career ==
Ong began inconsistently posting videos sometime before 2020, eventually noticing that she was gaining between 10,000 and 100,000 followers. She began producing videos in earnest after quitting her job in early 2020, posting under the handle chunkysdead. Ong describes her humor as "dark and raunchy and satirical comedy", telling The New York Times that she spent a decade "in the deepest corners of Reddit, cultivating this personality". In one incident, Ong appeared to intentionally post her Social Security number online, garnering 4 million views and making a follow-up video stating that nothing adverse had happened as a consequence. In another, she reacted to a video of a U.S. TikTok executive while wearing clown makeup. By May 2020, Ong's videos had drawn over 54.6 million likes, and as of March 2021, Ong had amassed over 3 million followers. More recently, she has launched a YouTube channel.

=== Step Chickens ===
At one point, Ong's videos began frequently featuring a chicken costume – she had purchased the costume in October 2019 for a Halloween party, but felt it went unappreciated. Those videos mostly failed to attract attention, but on one video, a user commented "Stepchicken what are you doing." The comment inspired Ong to create a series known as "CornHub", in which she satirizes popular tropes in pornography. On May 8, 2020, Ong released an installment in the series which featured her wearing the chicken suit and enacting a parody of stepbrother–stepsister pornography. The video went viral, garnering 1.1 million views. A day later, Ong asked her followers to simply comment "e." in the chat, which over 30,000 of them did. According to The Daily Dot, Ong said that this is when she "realized her power" to persuade her followers to engage in silly tasks. In the comments of another video, Ong's followers branded themselves to be a "cult" known as the "Step Chickens" and call her "Mother Hen". Ong asked them to change their profile pictures to an image of her, which many did; she also began asking them to execute "tasks", such as spamming the comments sections of others users.

The Step Chickens brought significant attention to Ong, who gained a million followers over the next two weeks. One early task Ong's followers performed was flooding the comments of Phil Swift, who changed his profile picture to match Ong's selfie. Other prominent accounts to change their profile pictures to Ong's image included several sports teams, The Washington Post, Adweek, and Kelly Rizzo. By May 25, 2020, TikTok videos under the hashtag #stepchickens had drawn 102 million views. An app called "Blink", managed by Sam Mueller, was rebranded around the Step Chickens; Mueller befriended Ong when they worked at Yahoo, with the former eventually leaving to found Blink. Initially, the Step Chickens had asked for a Discord server to congregate, but after Blink was rebranded to serve that purpose – adopting Ong's selfie as the app's icon picture – the app was downloaded more than 100,000 times. Ong also released a song about the Step Chickens.

Abram Brown with Forbes credits the Step Chickens as TikTok's first "cult", but Taylor Lorenz with The New York Times writes that users on TikTok had been forming cults of personality, "armies", and "gangs" for months prior, citing the Dum Dum gang as one prior example. Ong is generally credited, however, with popularizing the notion of TikTok "cults" in general, inspiring several other creators to start similar groups – her group is also credited as the largest and "most powerful". These groups began to compete with, or ask for recognition from, Ong and the Step Chickens. The "cults" are most akin to cults of personality and fandoms, lacking a unifying ideology but instead centered around a single creator, leading Sangeeta Singh-Kurtz with The Cut to remark that "it doesn't seem like TikTok cults are much cause for concern".

== See also ==
- Stan Twitter
