= Chung Hwa Middle School, Bandar Seri Begawan =

Private school in Brunei

Chung Hwa Middle School 中华中学

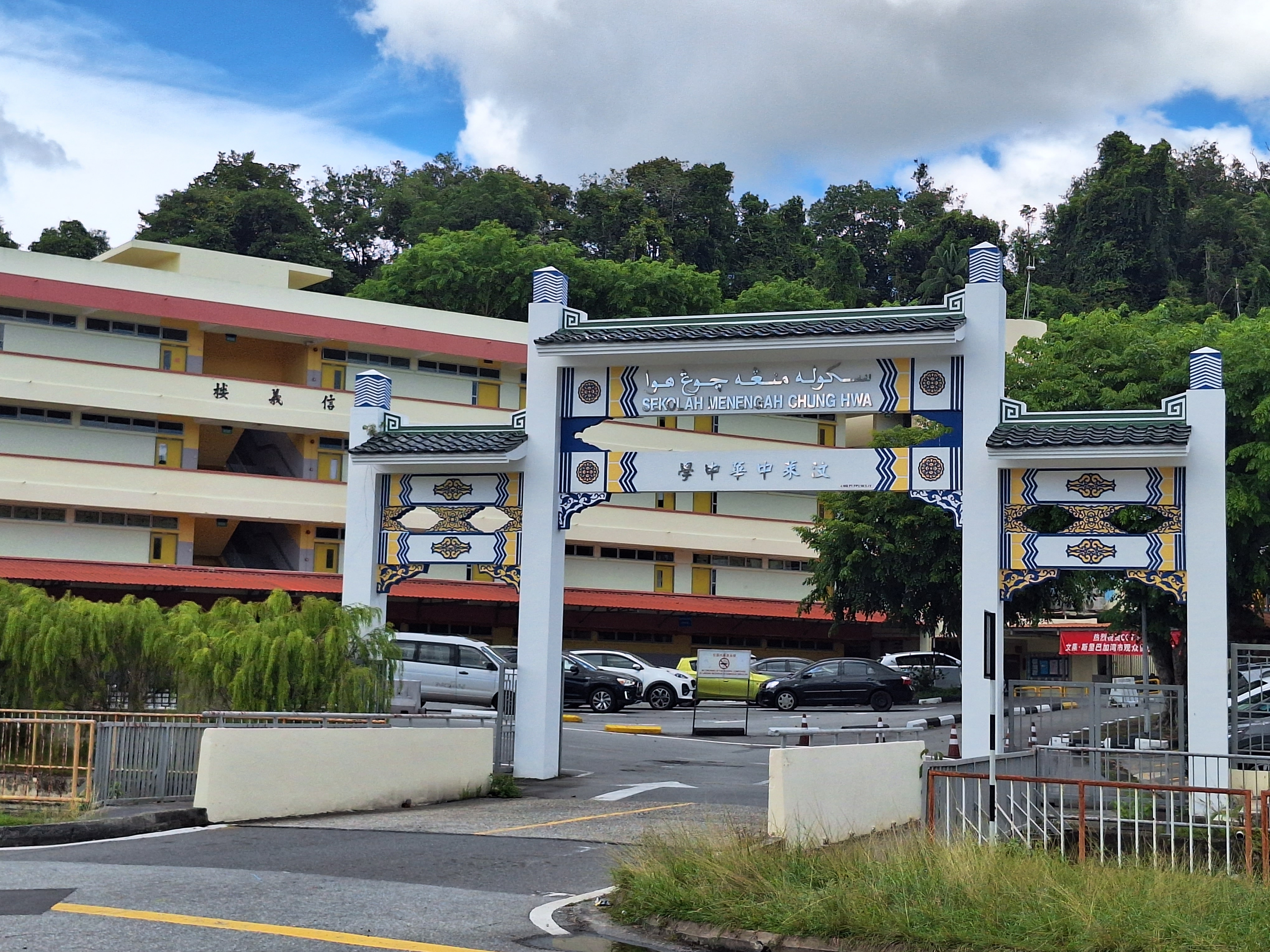
- The school's main entrance

Location
- 1 Jalan Berangan, Bandar Seri Begawan BS8211, Brunei Darussalam
- Coordinates: 4.894565°N 114.944431°E

Information
- School type: Private
- Motto: 禮, 義, 廉, 耻 (Propriety, Righteousness, Modesty, Remorsefulness)
- Established: 1922
- Founder: Ong Boon Pang
- Chairman: Jeffrey Yong Teck Chin
- Principal: Kho Guik Lan
- Gender: Coeducational
- Houses: 4
- Colors: Navy blue and white
- Website: chms.edu.bn

Chinese name
- Simplified Chinese: 中华中学
- Traditional Chinese: 中華中學
Transcriptions
Standard Mandarin
- Hanyu Pinyin: Zhōnghuá Zhōngxué
Southern Min
- Hokkien POJ: Tiong-hôa Tiong-ha̍k

Chung Hwa Middle School, Bandar Seri Begawan (CHMS, BSB; Chinese: 汶莱中华中学; Malay: Sekolah Menengah Chung Hwa, Bandar Seri Begawan) or colloquially known as Wén Zhōng (汶中), is a co-educational private school located in Kampong Berangan of Bandar Seri Begawan, Brunei. It is known as the country's largest and oldest Chinese private school since its establishment in 1922.

== History ==
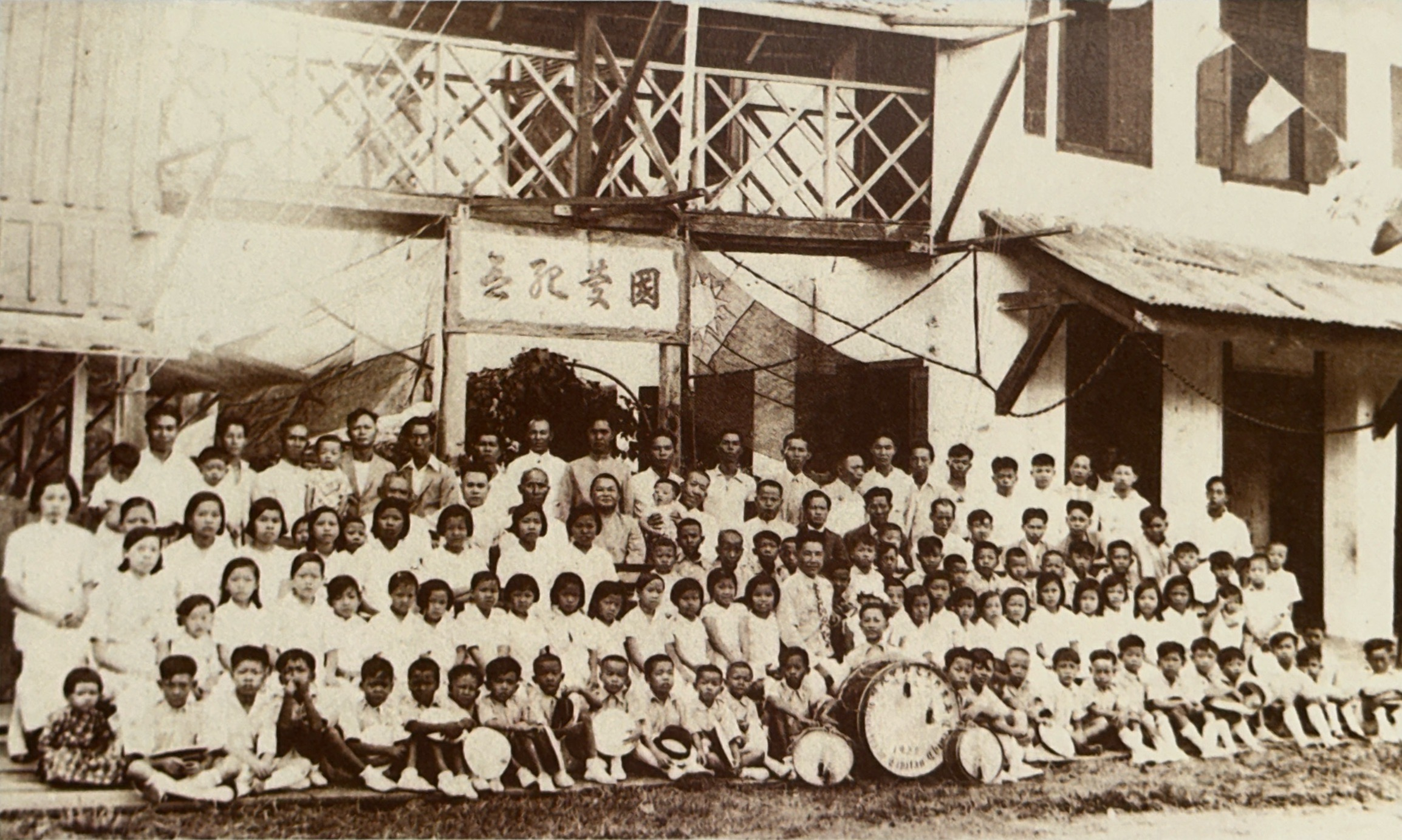
Ong Boon Pang (centre, holding a child) with students and staff of Chung Hwa School in 1934

Ong Boon Pang and his associates were the founders of the sole Chinese middle school in Bandar Seri Begawan, which opened its doors in 1922. In 1918, it was first known as York Choi School (育才学校) and ran informally out of a two-story rented shophouse. In 1922, the school changed their name to Chung Hwa School (中华学校) and adopted a primary schooling system in 1926. John Graham Black, the British resident in Brunei at the time, presided over the inauguration ceremony of a new school building that was constructed in Jalan Bendahara in 1938.

In 1940, Ong died after chairing the school board for 22 years, founding and laying the solid foundation the school is currently built upon. During the Japanese occupation of Brunei, the school briefly ceased operation. After the liberation of Brunei from the Imperial Japanese, the school resumed operation headed by a directorial system.

The school had 536 pupils enrolled in 1952; that number increased to 581 the following year. When the school began providing secondary education in 1955, it was renamed Chung Hwa Middle School, Brunei (汶莱中华中学). The Bruneian government began subsidising the school in 1957, covering the costs of building and renovating the school's essential buildings as well as the wages of the instructors and administrators. The school that offered an upper-secondary level successfully adopted a complete learning program in 1959. The school additionally exceeded the milestone of 1000 pupils overall at this time.

In 1970, when the government ceased financial support for the school, financial constraints were imposed. This issue was resolved when Lim Teck Hoo, other board members, and the Chinese community agreed to provide the school with a monthly donation. The school celebrated its 50th anniversary in 1972, with Sultan Omar Ali Saifuddien III officiating the event. During the 1970s and 1980s, the Muara Chinese community began sending their children to the school, though some also enrolled in English-medium schools.

In the late 1980s and early 1990s, the school underwent a significant period of expansion and enhancement. In the early 1980s, Ong Kim Kee donated B$150,000 towards the construction of staff dormitories and administrative buildings at CHMS, and in recognition of his contributions, one of the teacher hostels was named "Dato Ong Kim Kee." Key highlights during this period included the construction of a new administration complex and the school's 60th anniversary celebration in 1982, attended by Prince Mohamed Bolkiah. In 1986, the school introduced its sixth-form classes and established the Alumni Education Fund. Additionally, the school became one of the first to computerise its management processes and implement digital lessons for extracurricular and administrative purposes.

The institution maintained its pace in the early 1990s by building a new dormitory building for faculty and staff. In 1998 when its website was launched, giving parents and other interested parties easy online access to student performance reports and test results. The school also incorporated information and communications technology (ICT) into the classroom.

Then-chairman Ang Swee Chuan formally launched the Chung Hwa Middle School, Bandar Seri Begawan Legacy Hall on 28 September 2002. The brand-new educational building, known as the Pehin Datu Temenggong Dato Seri Paduka Lim Teck Hoo Building (丕显天猛公拿督林德甫馆), finished on 6 January 2008.

The school's primary section began using a new education method for Chinese language from the beginning of 2011. In the same year, the school also won awards in a number of national and local contests, such as the APICTA Competition in Pattaya, and Kuala Lumpur. On 11 October 2012, the school staged a major celebration to mark its 90th anniversary. Cabinet officials and members of the royal family were among the attendees, including Sultan Hassanal Bolkiah. In 2022, the school celebrated the centenary of its founding in 1922. During the celebration, the Sultan gave long-service medals to fifteen members of the CHMS board of directors, followed by student performances that highlighted the school's founding.

== Notable alumni ==
- Goh Kiat Chun (born 1979), actor and singer
- Basma Lachkar (born 2003), wushu athlete
- Walid Lachkar, wushu athlete
- Lee Ying Shi (born 1994), wushu athlete
- Ong Kim Kee (1931–1998), businessman and community leader
- Hosea Wong (born 2003), wushu athlete
- Roderick Yong (born 1932), educator and diplomat

== Gallery ==
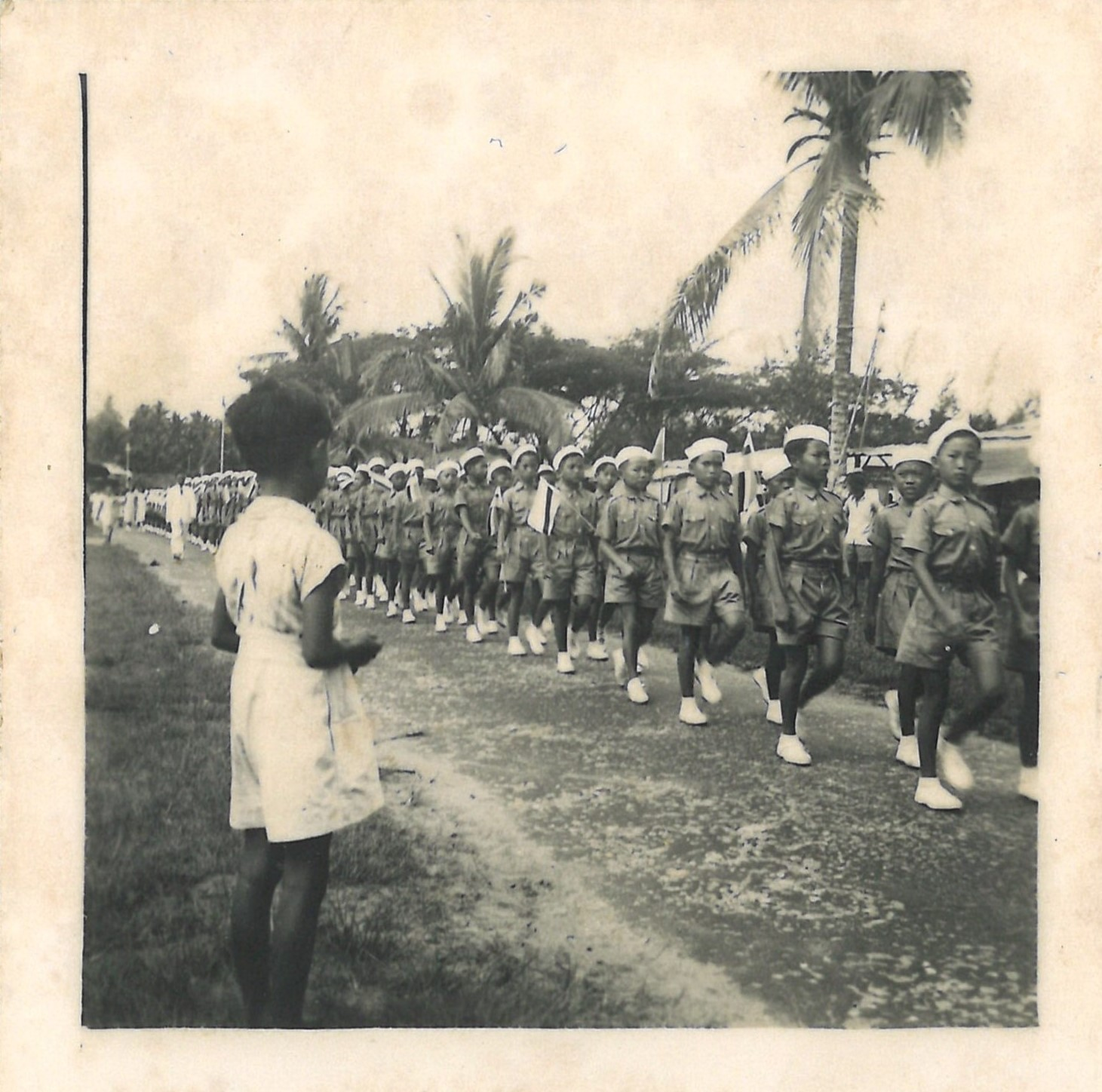
Students marching to welcome Sultan Ahmad Tajuddin, c. 1949

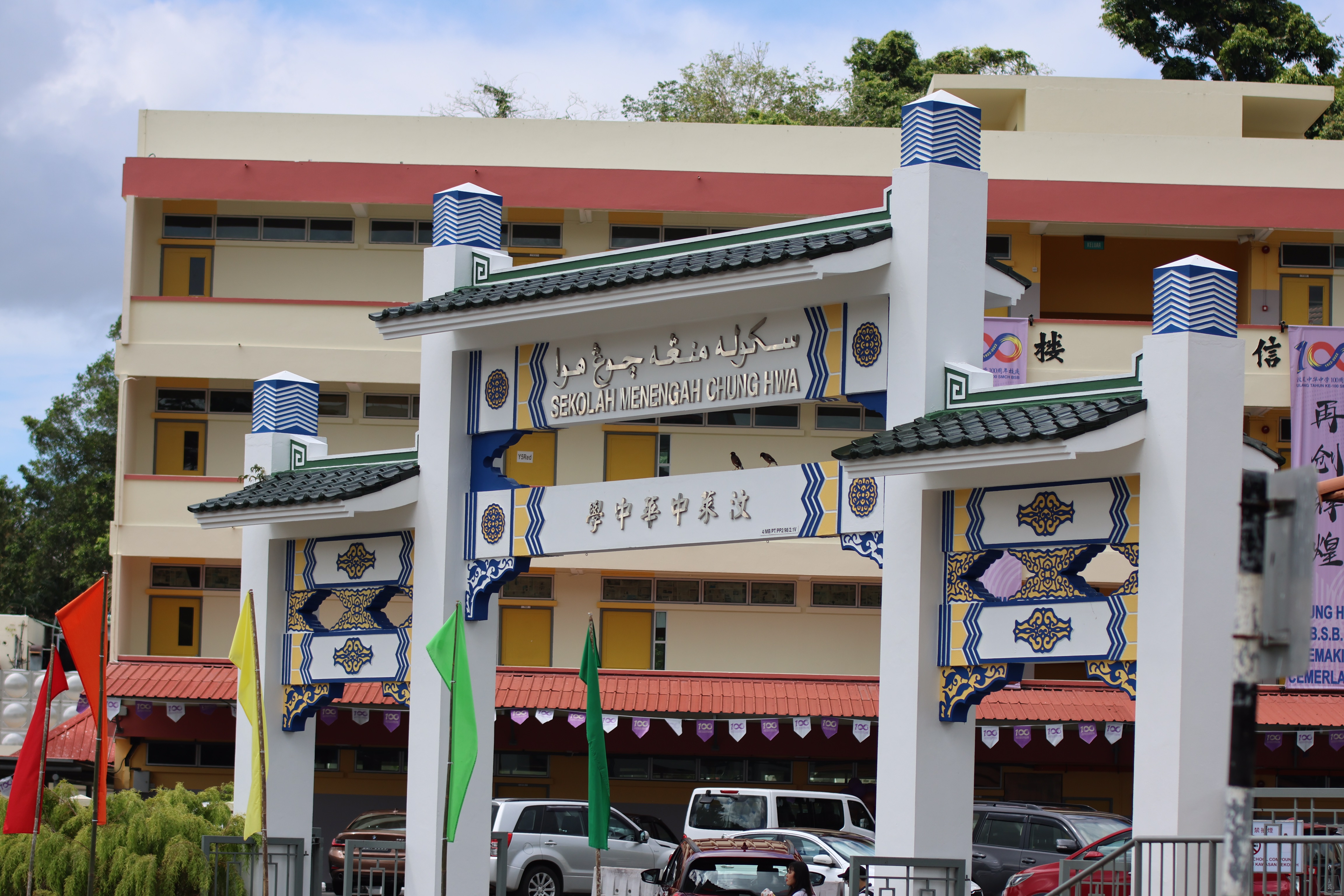
The school's pailou in 2022

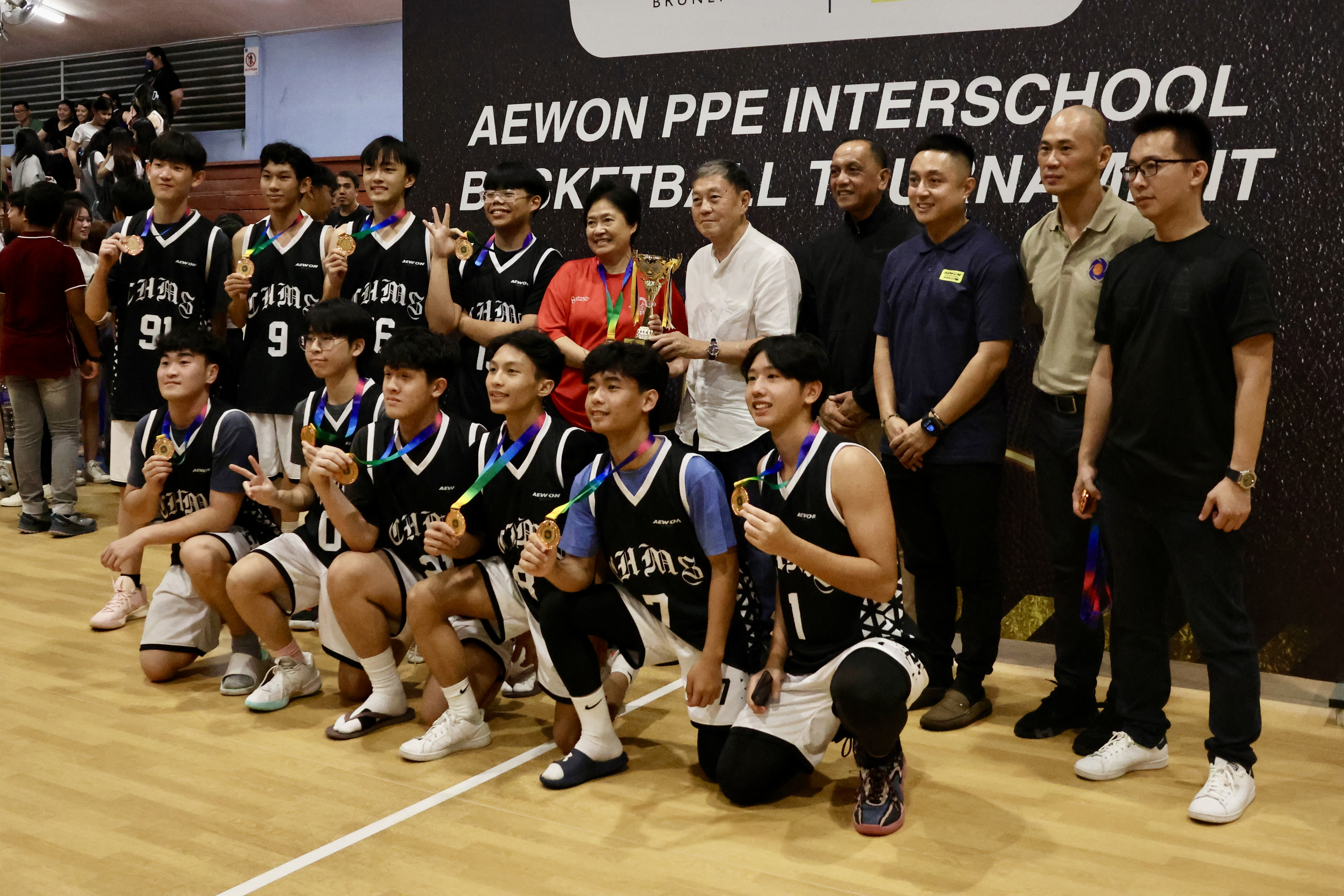
Chung Hwa Middle School basketball team

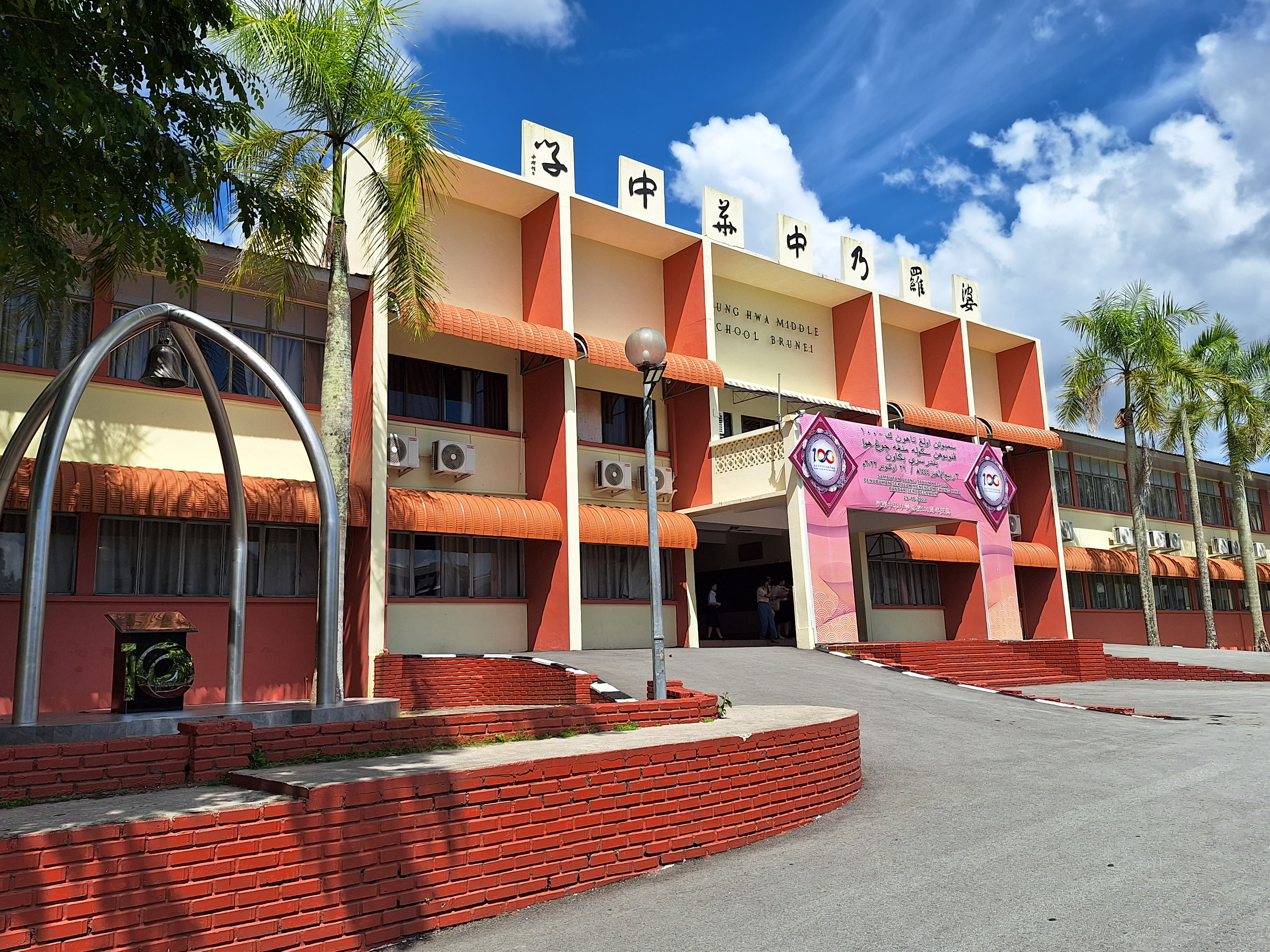
Main school building in 2022
