= Visa policy of ASEAN members =

Policy on permits required to enter any ASEAN member state

Visa policy of ASEAN members may refer to:

- Visa policy of Brunei
- Visa policy of Cambodia
- Visa policy of Indonesia
- Visa policy of Laos
- Visa policy of Malaysia
- Visa policy of Myanmar
- Visa policy of the Philippines
- Visa policy of Singapore
- Visa policy of Thailand
- Visa policy of Timor-Leste
- Visa policy of Vietnam

== Mutual visa free policy among ASEAN members ==
Visa exemption	Visa on arrival	eVisa	Visa required

Destination	Nationality										
Destination	(Brunei)	(Cambodia)	(Indonesia)	(Laos)	(Malaysia)	(Myanmar)	(Philippines)	(Singapore)	(Thailand)	(Timor-Leste)	(Vietnam)
Brunei	—	14	14	14	30	14	14	30	14	—	14
Cambodia	14	—	30	30	30	14	30	30	7 (Note: Length of stay reduced from 14 days to 7 days due to the 2025 Cambodian–Thai border crisis.)	30 (Note: Also eligible to enter using an eVisa.)	30
Indonesia	30	30	—	30	30	30	30	30	30	30	30
Laos	14	30	30	—	30	14	30	30	30	30	30
Malaysia	30	30	30	30	—	14	30	30	30	30	30
Myanmar	14	14	14	14	14	—	14	30	14 (Note: For air arrivals only.)	—	30
Philippines	30	30	30	30	30	30	—	30	30	59	30
Singapore	30	30	30	30	30	30	30	—	30	30	30
Thailand	60	7	60	60	60	14	60	60	—	30	60
Timor-Leste	30	30	30	30	30	30	30	30	30	—	30
Vietnam	14	30	30	30	30	30	21	30	30	90	—
