= Visa policy of Brunei =

Policy on permits required to enter Brunei

External image
- Map of border crossings of Brunei

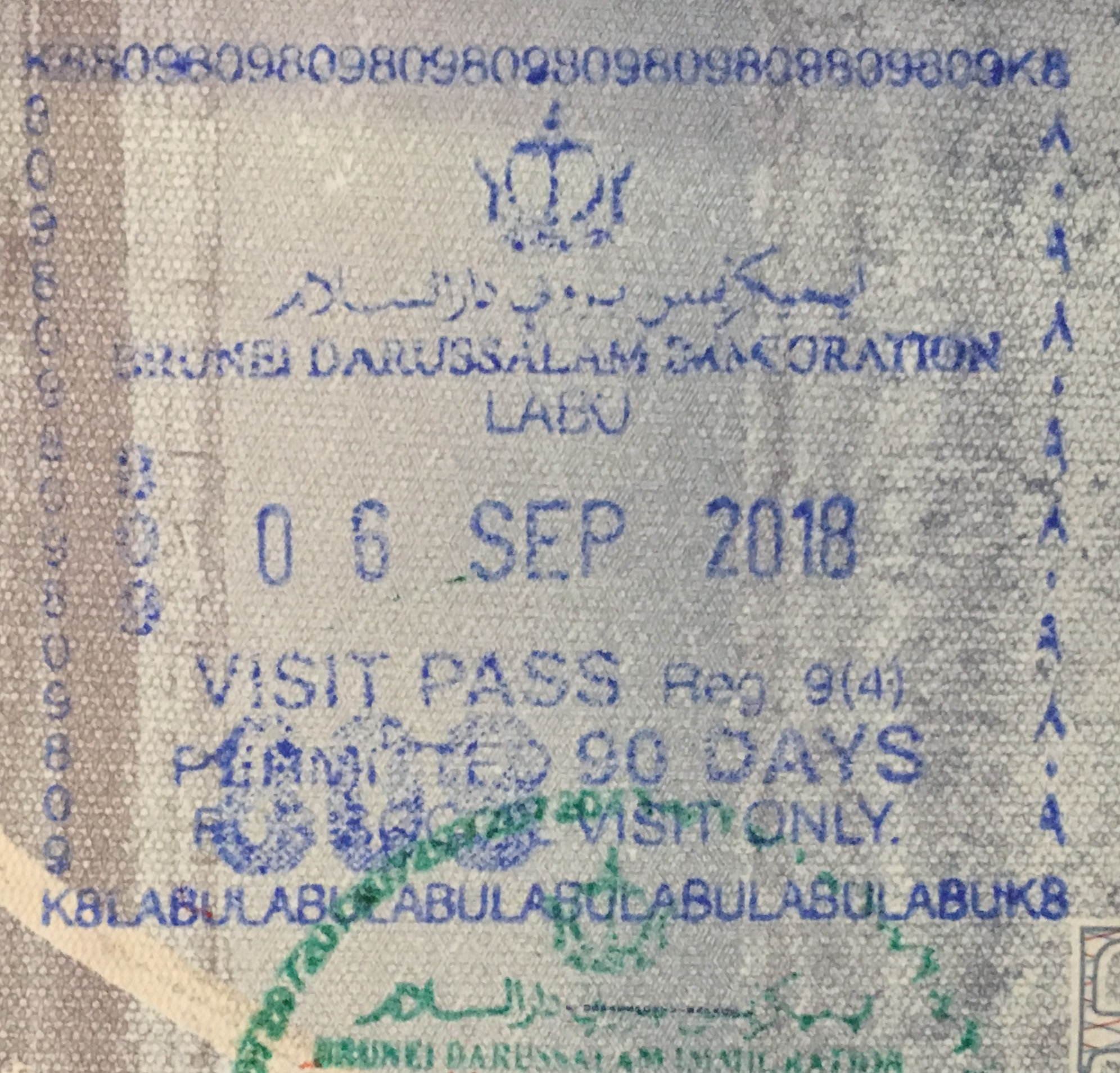
Entry stamp of Brunei, entering at Labu, Temburong

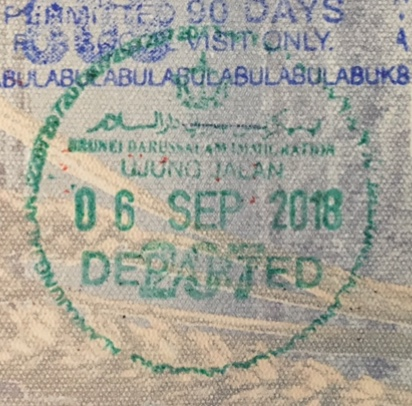
Exit stamp of Brunei, exiting at Ujung Jalan, Bangar, Temburong

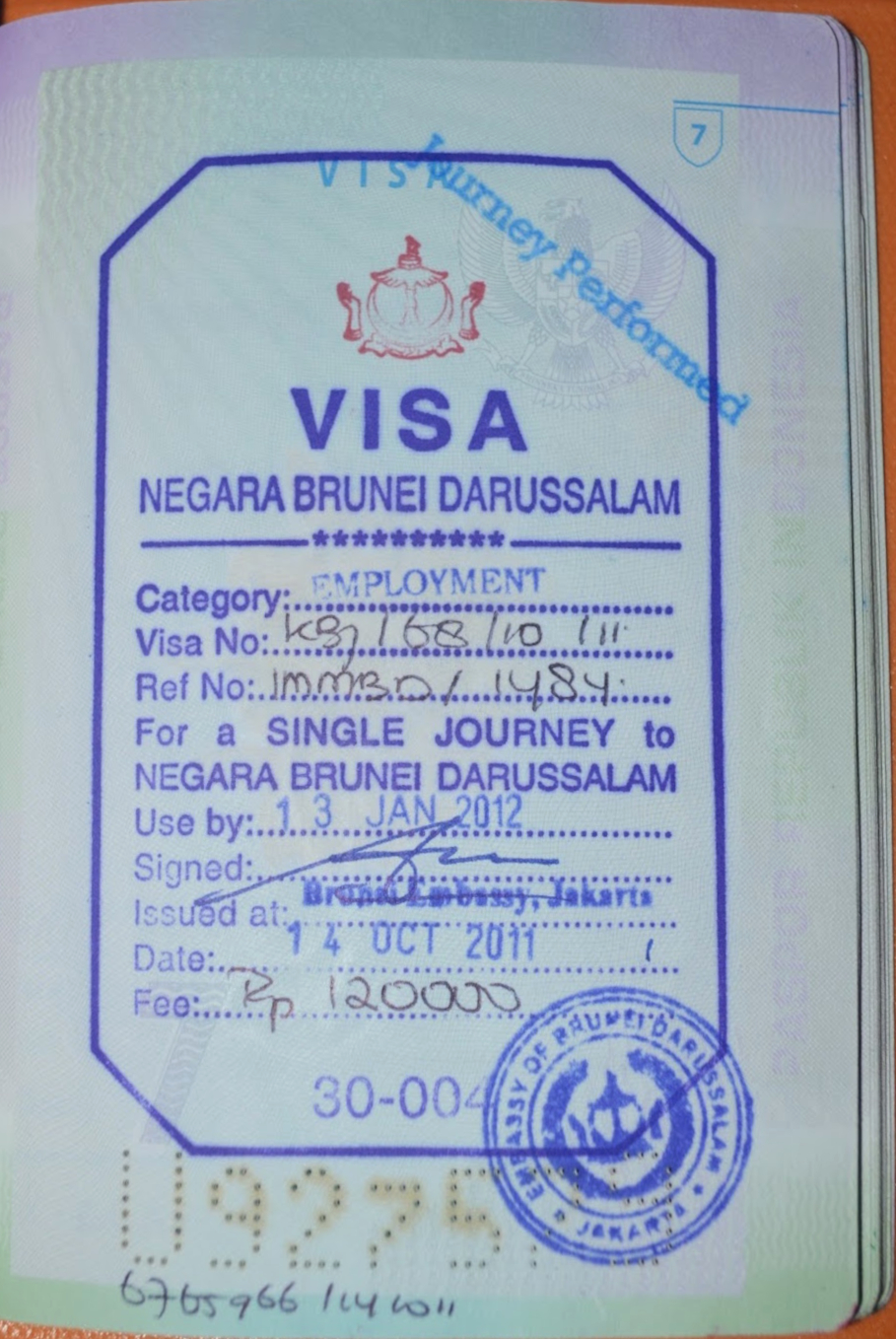
Bruneian employment visa

Visitors to Brunei must obtain a visa from one of the Bruneian diplomatic missions unless they are citizens of one of the visa-exempt countries or citizens who are eligible to obtain a visa on arrival. All visitors must have a passport valid for at least 6 months.

== Visa policy map ==
Visa policy of Brunei Brunei Visa not required (90 days) Visa not required (30 days) Visa not required (14 days) Visa on arrival Visa required Admission refused

== Visa exemption ==
=== Ordinary passports ===
Holders of ordinary passports of the following countries and territories may enter Brunei without a visa for stays up to the duration listed below:

90 days

- All European Union member states
- All European Free Trade Association member states

- Canada
- United Kingdom^{1}
- United States

30 days

- Japan
- Laos
- Malaysia
- New Zealand
- Oman
- Singapore
- South Korea
- Turkey
- Ukraine
- United Arab Emirates

14 days

- Cambodia
- China^{2}
- Costa Rica
- Hong Kong^{2}
- Indonesia
- Kosovo
- Macau^{2}
- Maldives
- Myanmar
- Peru
- Philippines
- Russia
- Taiwan
- Thailand
- Vietnam

_{1 - For British citizens and British subjects with right of abode in the UK only.}
_{2 - For Chinese citizens with People's Republic of China passports, Hong Kong Special Administrative Region passports or Macao Special Administrative Region passports only.}

=== Non-ordinary passports ===
Holders of diplomatic or official / service passports of the following countries may enter Brunei without a visa for 30 days (unless otherwise noted):

- ASEAN member states (except Cambodia, Myanmar and Vietnam)

- Bangladesh
- Cambodia^{1}
- China
- Costa Rica^{1}
- Hong Kong^{1}
- India^{1}
- Iran
- Japan
- Macao^{1}
- Maldives^{1}
- Mongolia^{1}
- Morocco
- Myanmar^{1}
- Oman
- Pakistan
- Peru^{1}
- Russia^{1}
- South Korea
- Tajikistan^{1}
- Timor-Leste
- Turkey
- United Arab Emirates
- Ukraine
- United Kingdom^{3}
- Vietnam^{1}

_{1 - 14 days}
_{2 - 15 days}
_{3 - 90 days}

Date of visa changes

Under the Passports Act (Charter 146) and the Passports (Visa) (Exemption) Order 1985

Malaysian and Singaporean citizens have never needed a visa to gain access to Brunei. The visa exemption for citizens of both countries was codified into Passports (Visa) (Exemption) Order 1985 upon its enactment on 1 March 1985.

Ordinary passports:

- 1 March 1985: Indonesia, Philippines and Thailand (only by air and disembarks at the Brunei International Airport)
- 1 September 1985: Canada, France, Japan, Liechtenstein, South Korea, Switzerland and United Kingdom
- 1 October 1986: Belgium, Luxembourg and Netherlands
- 24 January 1987: West Germany, as Germany from 3 Oct 1990
- 1 February 1987: Maldives
- 1 October 1987: Sweden
- 1 June 1988: Denmark
- 1 July 1990: Norway
- 1 July 1993: New Zealand
- 29 July 1993: United States
- 1 April 1997: Indonesia, Philippines and Thailand
- 1 May 1999: Spain
- 9 August 1999: Italy
- 1 February 2000: Oman
- 1 November 2000: Peru
- 1 July 2003: Ireland and Poland
- 11 October 2003: Austria and United Arab Emirates
- 1 November 2004: Slovakia
- 1 January 2005: Hungary
- 1 May 2005: Laos
- 1 November 2005: Czech Republic
- 6 December 2005: Slovenia
- 1 October 2006: Cyprus, Estonia, Finland, Greece, Latvia, Lithuania, Malta and Portugal
- 1 August 2007: Vietnam
- 1 January 2008: Iceland
- 1 February 2008: Bulgaria and Romania
- 1 June 2010: Hong Kong
- 4 August 2011: Cambodia
- 30 April 2011: Ukraine
- 28 January 2012: Macao
- 1 September 2014: Myanmar
- 1 January 2016: Croatia
- 1 June 2016: Turkey
- 8 January 2018: Russia
- 1 September 2018: Costa Rica
- 8 March 2025: China
- 3 July 2025: Kosovo
- 23 June 2025: Taiwan

Diplomatic and official passports:

- 12 May 1995: Iran
- 1 November 1997: Vietnam
- 15 May 1998: Laos
- 28 June 1998: Myanmar
- 1 August 2000: Cambodia
- 1 January 2005: Ukraine
- 19 June 2005: China
- 20 June 2009: Pakistan
- 11 November 2009: Russia
- 3 April 2010: Tajikistan
- 11 August 2011: Austria, Belgium, Cyprus, Czech Republic, Denmark, Estonia, Finland, France, Germany, Greece, Hungary, Ireland, Italy, Latvia, Lithuania, Luxembourg, Malta, Netherlands, Poland, Portugal, Slovakia, Slovenia, Spain, Sweden and United Kingdom
- 1 August 2013: Mongolia
- 16 April 2015: Thailand
- 1 January 2016:Liechtenstein
- 4 May 2016: India
- 1 June 2016: Turkey
- 30 January 2017: Kuwait
- 31 October 2018: Morocco
- 21 May 2019: Bangladesh
- 13 December 2024: Timor-Leste

== Visa on arrival ==
=== Ordinary passports ===
Holders of passports of the following 5 countries and territories may obtain a visa on arrival for a fee at all immigration checkpoints.
The availability of the type of visas obtainable on arrival depends on nationality.

30 days

- Australia^{M}
- Bahrain^{M}
- Kuwait
- Qatar^{M}
- Saudi Arabia

_{All nationals above may apply for a single entry visa for B$20, valid for 30 days.}
_{M - Nationals may apply for a multiple entry visa for B$30, valid for 30 days.}

=== Non-ordinary passports ===
Holders of diplomatic or official/service passports of the following countries may obtain a visa on arrival (V.O.A) for the following period:

30 days

- Bahrain
- Kuwait
- Qatar
- Saudi Arabia

== Transit visa ==
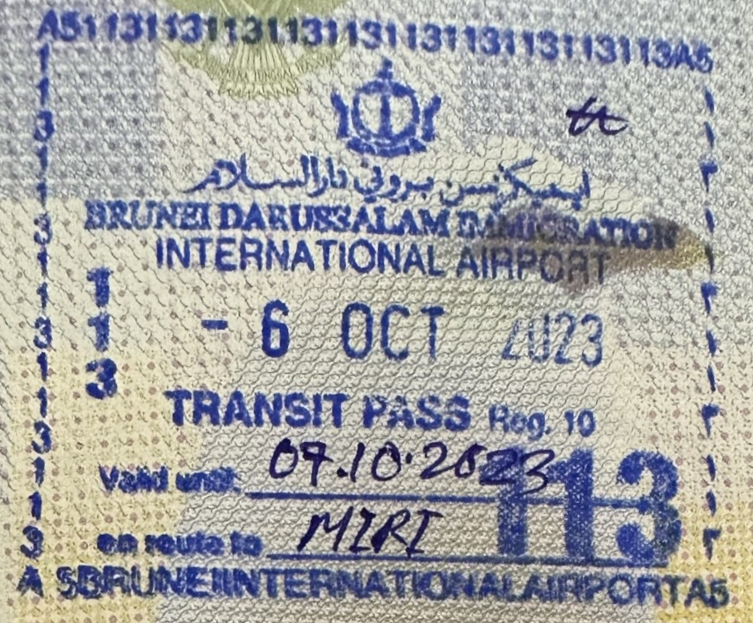
Transit pass granted at Brunei International Airport for an individual on their way to Miri, Sarawak, Malaysia.

Passengers transiting through Brunei International Airport for less than 24 hours do not require a visa.

Those traveling to a third country can obtain a transit visa on arrival for a maximum stay of 72 hours. This does not apply to nationals of Cuba, and North Korea. Nationals of Bangladesh, India, Iran, Pakistan and Sri Lanka must have a sponsor such as an airline or a travel agent.

== APEC Business Travel Card ==
Holders of passports issued by the following countries who possess an APEC Business Travel Card (ABTC) containing the code "BRN" on the back of the card may enter Brunei without a visa for business trips for up to 90 days.

ABTCs are issued to citizens of:

- Australia
- Chile
- China
- Hong Kong
- Indonesia
- Japan
- South Korea
- Malaysia
- Mexico
- New Zealand
- Papua New Guinea
- Peru
- Philippines
- Russia
- Singapore
- Taiwan
- Thailand
- Vietnam

== Israel ==
Entry and transit are refused to Israeli nationals, even if not leaving the aircraft and proceeding by the same flight.

== Visa overstaying ==
Immigration offenses, such as visa overstaying, are punishable by jail, fines and caning.

== Visitor statistics ==
Most visitors arriving to Brunei on short-term basis in 2011 were from the following countries of nationality:

Rank	country	2011
1	Malaysia	61,470
2	China	32,853
3	Indonesia	20,350
4	Australia	18,845
5	United Kingdom	18,222
6	Philippines	17,446
7	Singapore	16,221
8	New Zealand	10,381
9	Thailand	4,809
10	India	4,616

== See also ==
- Visa requirements for Bruneian citizens
- Bruneian passport
