= Visa requirements for East Timorese citizens =

Administrative entry restrictions

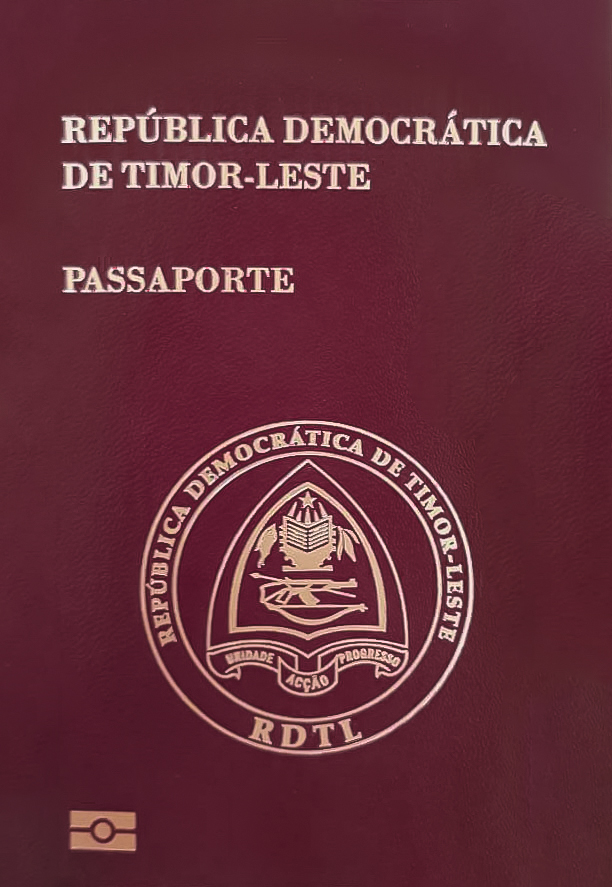
An East Timorese passport issued since 2017.

Visa requirements for East Timorese citizens are administrative entry restrictions by the authorities of other states placed on citizens of Timor-Leste.

As of 2026, East Timorese citizens had visa-free or visa on arrival access to 92 countries and territories, ranking the East Timorese passport 49th in the world according to the Henley Passport Index.

Timor-Leste signed a mutual visa waiver agreement with the European Union on 26 May 2015.

== Visa requirements map ==
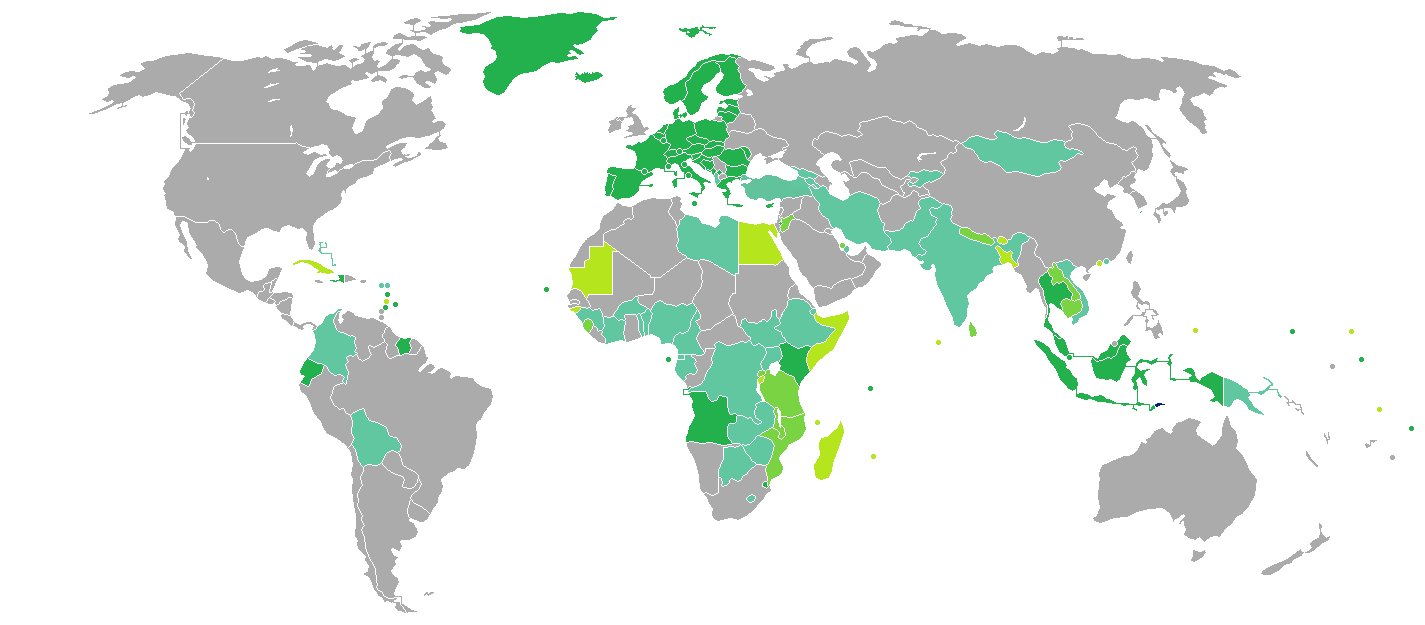
Visa requirements for East Timorese citizens holding ordinary passports Timor-Leste Visa not required Visa on arrival eVisa Visa available both on arrival or online Visa required

== Visa requirements ==
Country	Visa requirement	Allowed stay	Notes (excluding departure fees)
Afghanistan	eVisa	30 days	Visa is not required in case born in Afghanistan or can proof that one of their parents is a national of Afghanistan or born in Afghanistan.; e-Visa : Visitors must arrive at Kabul International (KBL).
Albania	eVisa		Visa is not required for Holders of a valid multiple-entry Schengen, UK or US visa has been previously used once or residence permit of Schengen, UK, US or UAE 10 years.
Algeria	Visa required		
Andorra	Visa not required	3 months	
Angola	Visa not required	30 days	30 days per trip, but no more than 90 days within any 1 calendar year for tourism purposes only.; Visitors must have a return/onward ticket and a hotel reservation confirmation.; An International Certificate of Vaccination is required.
Antigua and Barbuda	eVisa		
Argentina	Visa required		
Armenia	eVisa	120 days	
Australia and territories	Visa required		May apply online (Online Visitor e600 visa).
Austria	Visa not required	90 days	90 days within any 180 day period in the Schengen Area.
Azerbaijan	Visa required		
Bahamas	eVisa		
Bahrain	eVisa / Visa on arrival	14 days	
Bangladesh	Visa on arrival	30 days	
Barbados	Visa not required	28 days	
Belarus	Visa required		
Belgium	Visa not required	90 days	90 days within any 180 day period in the Schengen Area.
Belize	Visa required		
Benin	eVisa	30 days	Must have an international vaccination certificate.
Bhutan	eVisa		
Bolivia	eVisa /Visa on arrival	30 days	
Bosnia and Herzegovina	Visa not required	90 days	
Botswana	eVisa	3 months	
Brazil	Visa required		
Brunei	Visa required		
Bulgaria	Visa not required	90 days	90 days within any 180 day period in the Schengen Area.
Burkina Faso	eVisa		
Burundi	Visa on arrival	1 month	
Cambodia	eVisa / Visa on arrival	30 days	
Cameroon	eVisa		
Canada	Visa required		
Cape Verde	Visa not required	30 days	
Central African Republic	Visa required		
Chad	eVisa		
Chile	Visa required		
China	Visa required		Visa free for Hong Kong up to a week.; Visa on arrival for Macau.
Colombia	eVisa		
Comoros	Visa on arrival	45 days	
Republic of the Congo	Visa required		
Democratic Republic of the Congo	eVisa	7 days	
Costa Rica	Visa required		Holders of a valid multiple-entry visa of any member state of the Schengen Area, Canada, or the United States may enter Cost Rica without a visa for maximum stay of 30 days.
Côte d'Ivoire	eVisa	3 months	e-Visa holders must arrive via Port Bouet Airport.
Croatia	Visa not required	90 days	90 days within any 180 day period in the Schengen Area
Cuba	eVisa	90 days	Can be extended up to 90 days with a fee.
Cyprus	Visa not required	90 days	90 days within any 180 day period.
Czech Republic	Visa not required	90 days	90 days within any 180 day period in the Schengen Area.
Denmark	Visa not required	90 days	90 days within any 180 day period in the Schengen Area.
Djibouti	eVisa	90 days	
Dominica	Visa not required	21 days	
Dominican Republic	Visa required		Holders of a valid visa or a residence permit of any member state of the Schengen Area, Canada, Cyprus, Ireland, the United Kingdom or the United States may enter the Dominican Republic without a visa.
Ecuador	Visa not required	90 days	
Egypt	Visa on arrival	30 days	
El Salvador	eVisa		
Equatorial Guinea	eVisa		
Eritrea	Visa required		
Estonia	Visa not required	90 days	90 days within any 180 day period in the Schengen Area.
Eswatini	Visa not required	30 days	
Ethiopia	eVisa	up to 90 days	e-Visa holders must arrive via Addis Ababa Bole International Airport.
Fiji	Visa required		
Finland	Visa not required	90 days	90 days within any 180 day period in the Schengen Area.
France	Visa not required	90 days	90 days within any 180 day period in the Schengen Area.; Also visa-free access to Guadeloupe, Martinique, French Guiana, Saint Pierre and Miquelon, Réunion, Mayotte and Wallis and Futuna.
Gabon	eVisa	90 days	e-Visa holders must arrive via Libreville International Airport.
Gambia	Visa not required		Must obtain an entry clearance from the Gambian Immigration prior to travel.
Georgia	eVisa		
Germany	Visa not required	90 days	90 days within any 180 day period in the Schengen Area.
Ghana	Visa required		
Greece	Visa not required	90 days	90 days within any 180 day period in the Schengen Area.
Grenada	Visa required		
Guatemala	Visa required		Visa is not required up to 90 days if holding a valid residence permit issued by Australia, Canada, GCC member state the United States the United Kingdom or a Schengen Area Member State.
Guinea	eVisa	90 days	
Guinea-Bissau	Visa on arrival	90 days	
Guyana	Visa required		
Haiti	Visa not required	90 days	
Honduras	Visa required		
Hungary	Visa not required	90 days	90 days within any 180 day period in the Schengen Area.
Iceland	Visa not required	90 days	90 days within any 180 day period in the Schengen Area.
India	eVisa	30 days	e-Visa holders must arrive via 32 designated airports (Note: Ahmedabad; Amritsar; Bagdogra; Bengaluru; Bhubaneswar; Chandigarh; Chennai; Coimbatore; Delhi; Gaya; Goa-Dabolim; Goa-Manohar; Guwahati; Hyderabad; Indore; Jaipur; Kannur; Kochi; Kolkata; Kozhikode; Lucknow; Madurai; Mangaluru; Mumbai; Nagpur; Port Blair; Pune; Surat; Thiruvananthapuram; Tiruchirappalli; Varanasi; Visakhapatnam) or 5 designated seaports. (Note: Chennai; Cochin; Mormugao (Goa); Mumbai; Mangalore); An Indian e-Tourist Visa may only be obtained twice within 1 calendar year.; Foreigners of Pakistani origin or who hold a Pakistani Passport are not eligible for an e-Visa. Foreigners who are not Pakistani nationals, but whose parents or grandparents (either paternal or maternal) were born in, or were permanent residents in Pakistan, are also not eligible for an e-Visa.
Indonesia	Visa not required	30 days	
Iran	eVisa/ Visa on arrival	30 days	
Iraq	eVisa		
Ireland	Visa required		
Israel	Visa required		
Italy	Visa not required	90 days	90 days within any 180 day period in the Schengen Area.
Jamaica	Visa required		
Japan	Visa required		Eligible for an e-Visa if residing in one these countries Australia, Brazil, Cambodia, Canada, India, Saudi Arabia, Singapore, South Africa, Taiwan, United Arab Emirates, United Kingdom, United States.; May apply online
Jordan	eVisa / Visa on arrival		
Kazakhstan	Visa required		
Kenya	Electronic Travel Authorisation	90 days	Applications can be submitted up to 90 days prior to travel and must be submitted at least 3 days in advance.; eTA fee is 32.50 USD.; Proof of reservation at the hotel where visitors plan to stay is required (if staying with friends, an invitation letter is also acceptable).; Yellow fever vaccination certificate is required if coming from endemic countries.
Kiribati	Visa not required	90 days	90 days within any 12-month period.
North Korea	Visa required		
South Korea	Visa required		Multiple-Entry Visa may be granted to who entered South Korea four or more times within the last two years, or 10 or more visits in total (one of those 10 visits should be within the last 2 years).; May apply online
Kuwait	Visa required		e-Visa can be obtained for holders of a Residence Permit issued by a GCC member state under the following conditions: To be 18 years old and over.; The residence permit for a GCC state must be valid for at least another 3 months.; To be accompanied by the sponsor of the residence permit if the sponsor is an individual.; Does not apply to holders of a GCC Student Visa and Non-Skilled Worker Visa
Kyrgyzstan	eVisa	60 days	
Laos	Visa not required	30 days	
Latvia	Visa not required	90 days	90 days within any 180 day period in the Schengen Area.
Lebanon	Visa required		
Lesotho	eVisa		
Liberia	eVisa		
Libya	eVisa		
Liechtenstein	Visa not required	90 days	90 days within any 180 day period in the Schengen Area.
Lithuania	Visa not required	90 days	90 days within any 180 day period in the Schengen Area.
Luxembourg	Visa not required	90 days	90 days within any 180 day period in the Schengen Area.
Madagascar	eVisa / Visa on arrival	60 days	
Malawi	eVisa / Visa on arrival	90 days	
Malaysia	Visa not required	90 days	
Maldives	Free visa on arrival	30 days	
Mali	Visa required		
Malta	Visa not required	90 days	90 days within any 180 day period in the Schengen Area.
Marshall Islands	Visa on arrival	30 days	
Mauritania	eVisa		
Mauritius	Visa on arrival	60 days	
Mexico	Visa required		Visa is not required for Holders of a valid visa of Canada, US, UK or a Schengen State and Permanent residence of Canada, Chile, Colombia, Schengen State, Japan, UK, US; Entry may be refused by immigration officials for individuals who were previously denied a US visa, even if holding a valid Mexican visa.
Micronesia	Visa not required	30 days	
Moldova	Visa not required	90 days	90 days within any 180 day period.
Monaco	Visa not required		
Mongolia	eVisa	30 days	
Montenegro	Visa not required	90 days	
Morocco	Visa required		May apply for an e-Visa if holding a valid visa or a residency document issued by one of the following countries: Schengen Area, Australia, Canada, Ireland, New Zealand, United Kingdom, United States a residency document issued by Cyprus, Japan, United Arab Emirates.
Mozambique	eVisa / Visa on arrival	30 days	
Myanmar	Visa required		
Namibia	eVisa		
Nauru	Visa required		
Nepal	Online Visa / Visa on arrival	90 days	
Netherlands	Visa not required	90 days	90 days within any 180 day period in the Schengen Area.
New Zealand and territories	Visa required		United Nations Transitional Administration in East Timor travel documents are unacceptable, and visas will not be endorsed in them.; Holders of an Australian Permanent Resident Visa or Resident Return Visa may be granted a New Zealand Resident Visa on arrival permitting indefinite stay (pursuant to the Trans-Tasman Travel Arrangement), subject to meeting character requirements and obtaining an Electronic Travel Authority prior to departure.
Nicaragua	Visa required		Visa on arrival if holding valid visa issued by United States, Canada, or Schengen Member State.
Niger	Visa required		
Nigeria	eVisa	90 days	
North Macedonia	Visa required		
Norway	Visa not required	90 days	90 days within any 180 day period in the Schengen Area.
Oman	Visa required		
Pakistan	eVisa	3 months	Online Visa eligible.
Palau	Free visa on arrival	30 days	
Panama	Visa required		
Papua New Guinea	eVisa	60 days	Visitors may apply for a visa online under the "Tourist - Own Itinerary" category.
Paraguay	Visa required		
Peru	Visa required		
Philippines	eVisa	59 days	Available in single entry (valid for 3 months) or multiple entry (valid for 6 months or 1 year).
Poland	Visa not required	90 days	90 days within any 180 day period in the Schengen Area.
Portugal	Visa not required	90 days	90 days within any 180 day period in the Schengen Area.
Qatar	eVisa		
Romania	Visa not required	90 days	90 days within any 180 day period in the Schengen Area.
Russia	Visa required		
Rwanda	eVisa / Visa on arrival	30 days	
Saint Kitts and Nevis	eVisa		
Saint Lucia	Visa on arrival	6 weeks	
Saint Vincent and the Grenadines	Visa not required	3 months	
Samoa	Visa not required	60 days	
San Marino	Visa not required		
São Tomé and Príncipe	Visa not required	15 days	
Saudi Arabia	Visa required		Tourist visa on arrival for holders of a valid multiple entry visa from US, UK or Schengen area, under the condition that the multiple entry visa has been used at least once, proving that by showing the entry and exit stamps of the country of issuance.
Senegal	Visa on arrival		
Serbia	Visa required		
Seychelles	Electronic Border System	3 months	Application can be submitted up to 30 days before travel.; Visitors must upload a reservation confirmation(s) for each visitor's location of stay in Seychelles.; Yellow fever vaccination certificate is required if coming from endemic countries.; Payment of the fee (EUR 10) by credit or debit card.; Valid for one journey only and it expires once exit the country.
Sierra Leone	eVisa / Visa on arrival	3 months / 30 days	
Singapore	Visa not required	30 days	
Slovakia	Visa not required	90 days	90 days within any 180 day period in the Schengen Area.
Slovenia	Visa not required	90 days	90 days within any 180 day period in the Schengen Area.
Solomon Islands	Visa required		
Somalia	eVisa	30 days	
South Africa	Visa required		
South Sudan	eVisa		Obtainable online.; Printed visa authorization must be presented at the time of travel.
Spain	Visa not required	90 days	90 days within any 180 day period in the Schengen Area.
Sri Lanka	ETA / Visa on arrival	60 days / 30 days	Sri Lanka introduced an ETA valid for 30 days.
Sudan	Visa required		
Suriname	Visa not required	90 days	An entrance fee of USD 50 or EUR 50 must be paid online prior to arrival.; Multiple entry e-Visa is also available.
Sweden	Visa not required	90 days	90 days within any 180 day period in the Schengen Area.
Switzerland	Visa not required	90 days	90 days within any 180 day period in the Schengen Area.
Syria	eVisa		
Tajikistan	Visa required		
Tanzania	eVisa / Visa on arrival	90 days	
Thailand	Visa not required	30 days	
Togo	eVisa	15 days	
Tonga	Visa required		
Trinidad and Tobago	Visa required		
Tunisia	Visa required		
Turkey	eVisa	30 days	
Turkmenistan	Visa required		
Tuvalu	Visa on arrival	1 month	
Uganda	eVisa	3 months	
Ukraine	eVisa		
United Arab Emirates	eVisa		May apply using 'Smart service'.
United Kingdom	Visa required		
United States and territories	Visa required		
Uruguay	Visa required		
Uzbekistan	Visa required		
Vanuatu	Visa required		
Vatican City	Visa not required		
Venezuela	eVisa		Introduction of Electronic Visa System for Tourist and Business Travelers.
Vietnam	eVisa		e-Visa is valid for 90 days and multiple entry.
Yemen	Visa required		
Zambia	eVisa	90 days	
Zimbabwe	eVisa	3 months	

== Dependent, Disputed, or Restricted territories ==
Unrecognized or partially recognized countries

Visitor to	Conditions of access	Notes
Kosovo	Visa not required	90 days
Northern Cyprus	Visa not required	
Palestine	Visa not required	Arrival by sea to Gaza Strip not allowed.
Somaliland	Visa on arrival	30 days for 30 USD, payable on arrival.
Taiwan	Visa required	
Transnistria	Visa not required	Registration required after 24h.

Dependent and autonomous territories

Visitor to	Conditions of access	Notes
China
Hong Kong	Visa not required	30 days
Macau	Visa on arrival	30 days
Denmark
Faroe Islands	Visa not required	
Greenland	Visa not required	
France
French Guiana	Visa not required	
French Polynesia	Visa not required	
(France) French West Indies	Visa not required	French West Indies refers to Martinique, Guadeloupe, Saint Martin and Saint Barthélemy.
Mayotte	Visa not required	
New Caledonia	Visa not required	90 days within any 180 day period
Réunion	Visa not required	
Saint Pierre and Miquelon	Visa not required	
Wallis and Futuna	Visa not required	
Netherlands
Aruba	Visa required	
Caribbean Netherlands (includes Bonaire, Sint Eustatius and Saba)	Visa required	
Curaçao	Visa required	
Sint Maarten	Visa required	
New Zealand
Cook Islands	Visa not required	31 days
Niue	Visa required	
Tokelau	Visa required	
United Kingdom
Anguilla	Visa not required	90 days
Bermuda	Visa not required	90 days
British Indian Ocean Territory	Special permit required	Special permit required.
British Virgin Islands	Visa not required	90 days
Cayman Islands	Visa required	
Falkland Islands	Visa required	
Gibraltar	Visa required	
Montserrat	Visa not required	6 months
Pitcairn Islands	Visa not required	14 days visa free and landing fee 35 USD or tax of 5 USD if not going ashore.
Ascension Island	eVisa	90 days within any year period.
Saint Helena	Visa not required	90 days
Tristan da Cunha	Permission required	Permission to land required for 15/30 pounds sterling (yacht/ship passenger) for Tristan da Cunha Island or 20 pounds sterling for Gough Island, Inaccessible Island or Nightingale Islands.
South Georgia and the South Sandwich Islands	Permit required	Pre-arrival permit from the Commissioner required (72 hours / 1 month for 110 / 160 pounds sterling).
Turks and Caicos Islands	Visa required	Holders of a valid visa issued by Canada, United Kingdom or the USA do not required a visa for a maximum stay of 90 days.
United States
American Samoa	Visa required	
Guam	Visa required	
Northern Mariana Islands	Visa required	
U.S. Virgin Islands	Visa required	
Antarctica and adjacent islands
Special permits required for Bouvet Island, British Antarctic Territory, French Southern and Antarctic Lands, Argentine Antarctica, (Australia) Australian Antarctic Territory, (Antártica Chilena Province) Chilean Antarctic Territory, (Australia) Heard Island and McDonald Islands, (Norway) Peter I Island, (Norway) Queen Maud Land, (New Zealand) Ross Dependency.

== See also ==
- Visa policy of Timor-Leste
- East Timorese passport
- Foreign relations of Timor-Leste
