= List of diplomatic missions in Timor-Leste =

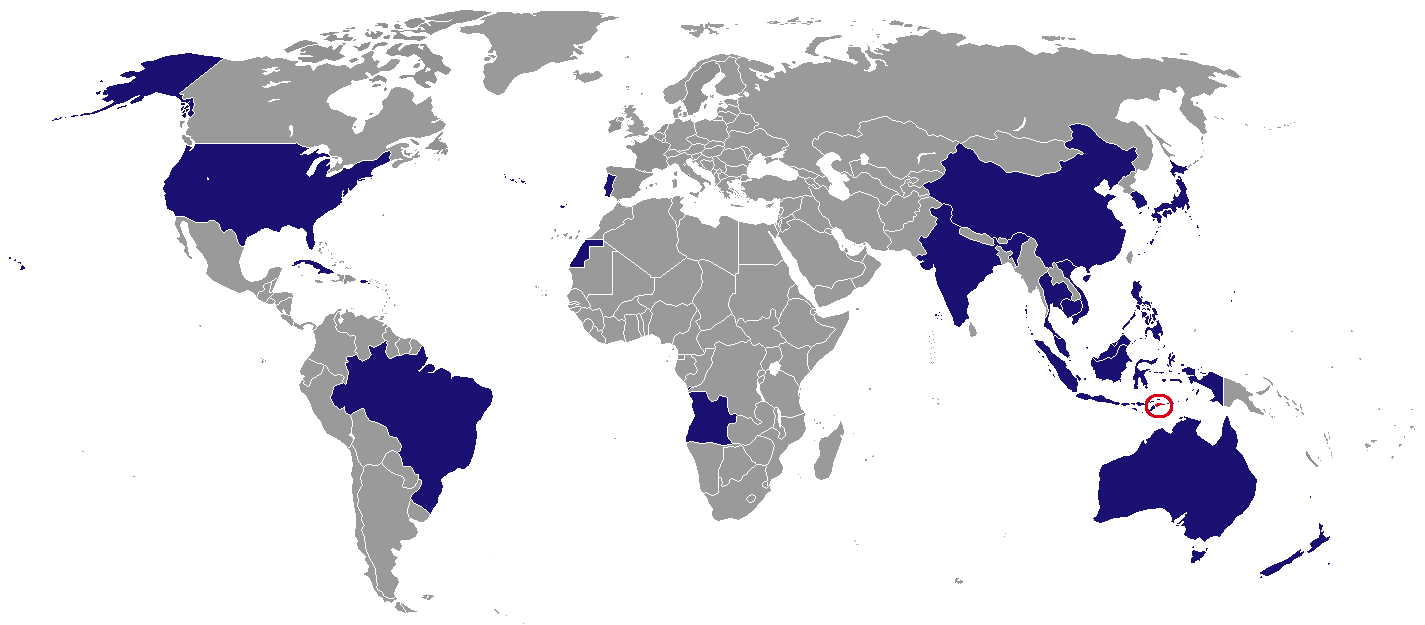
Countries with embassies in Timor-Leste

This is a list of diplomatic missions in Timor-Leste. The capital Dili hosts 22 embassies, mostly from neighboring and regional states. Eight of those are member-states of the Association of South East Asian Nations, to which Timor-Leste ascended to full membership in October 2025.

Honorary consulates, trade offices, and development agencies are excluded from this listing.

== Diplomatic missions in Dili ==
=== Embassies ===
1. Angola
2. Australia
3. Brazil
4. Brunei
5. Cambodia
6. China
7. Cuba
8. Holy See
9. India
10. Indonesia
11. Japan
12. Malaysia
13. New Zealand
14. Philippines
15. Portugal
16. Sahrawi Republic
17. Singapore
18. South Korea
19. Sovereign Military Order of Malta
20. Thailand
21. United States
22. Vietnam

=== Other missions and delegations ===
1. European Union (Delegation)
2. International Committee of the Red Cross (Delegation)
3. World Health Organization (Country Office)

== Gallery ==
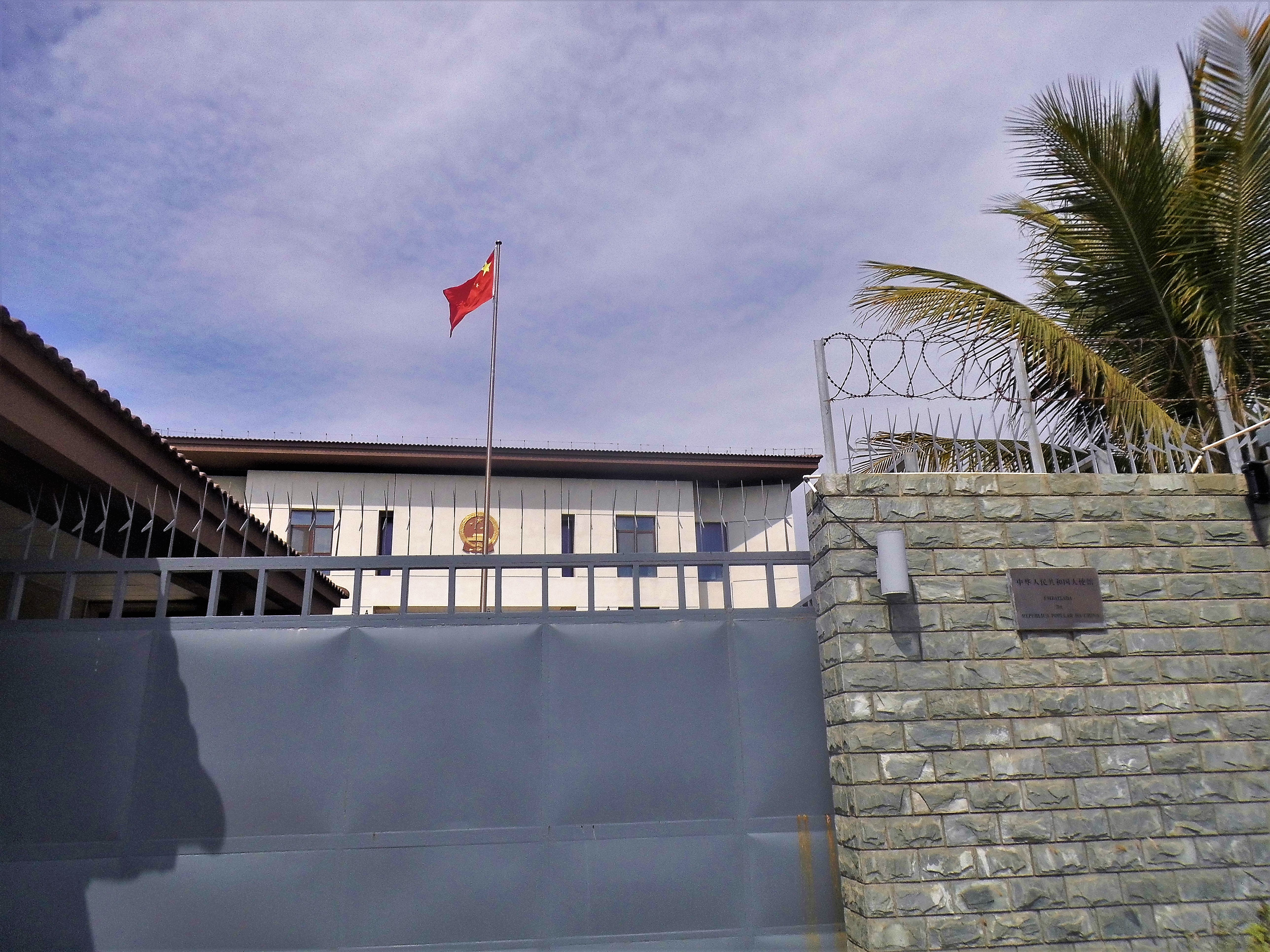
Embassy of China

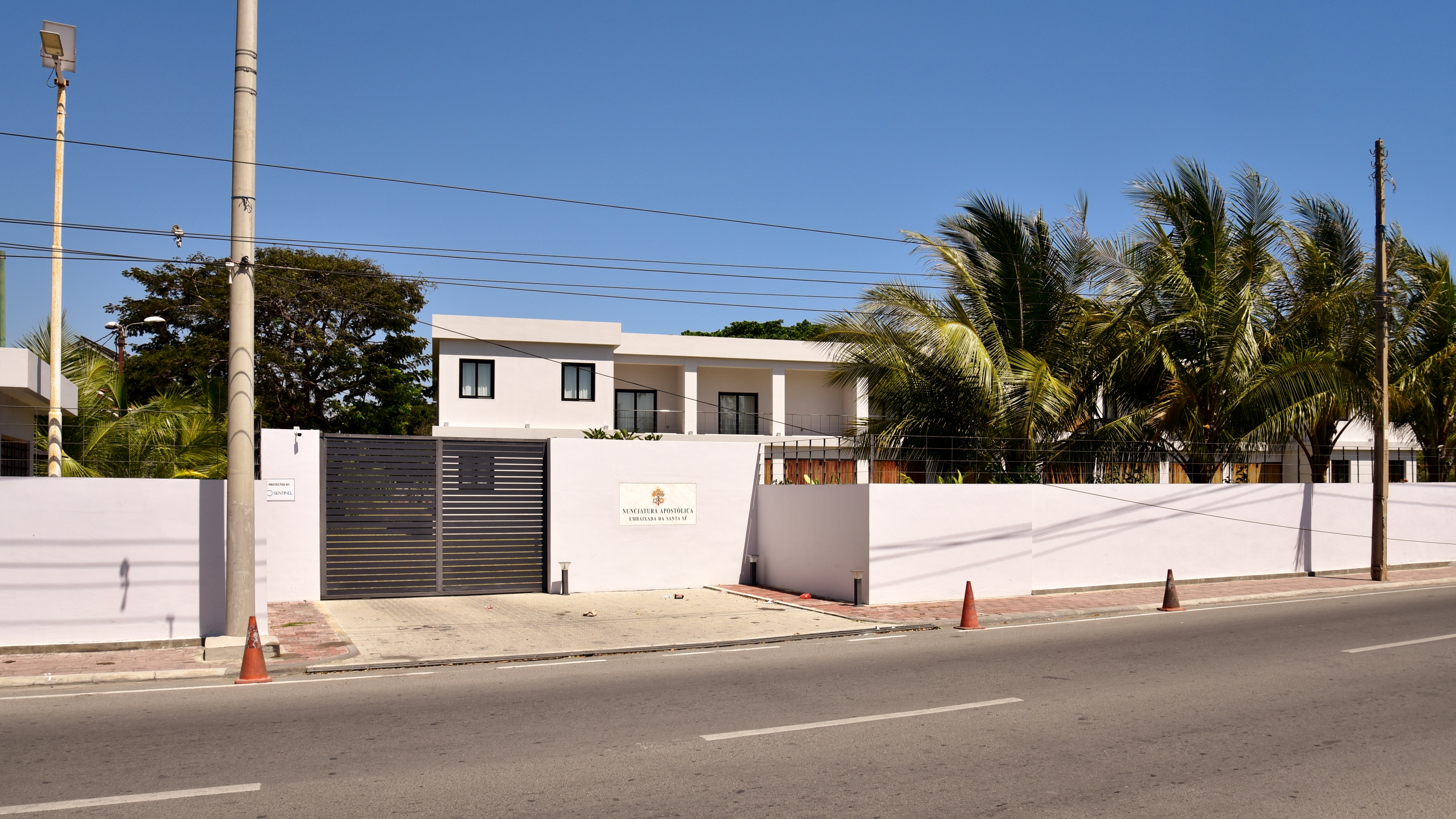
Apostolic Nunciature of the Holy See

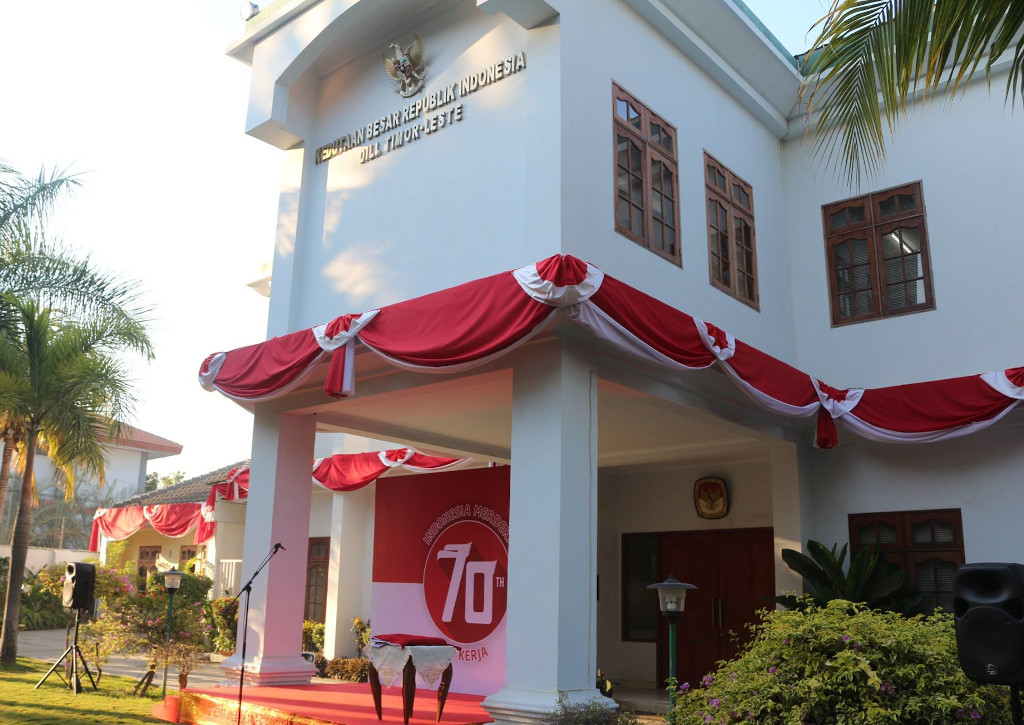
Embassy of Indonesia

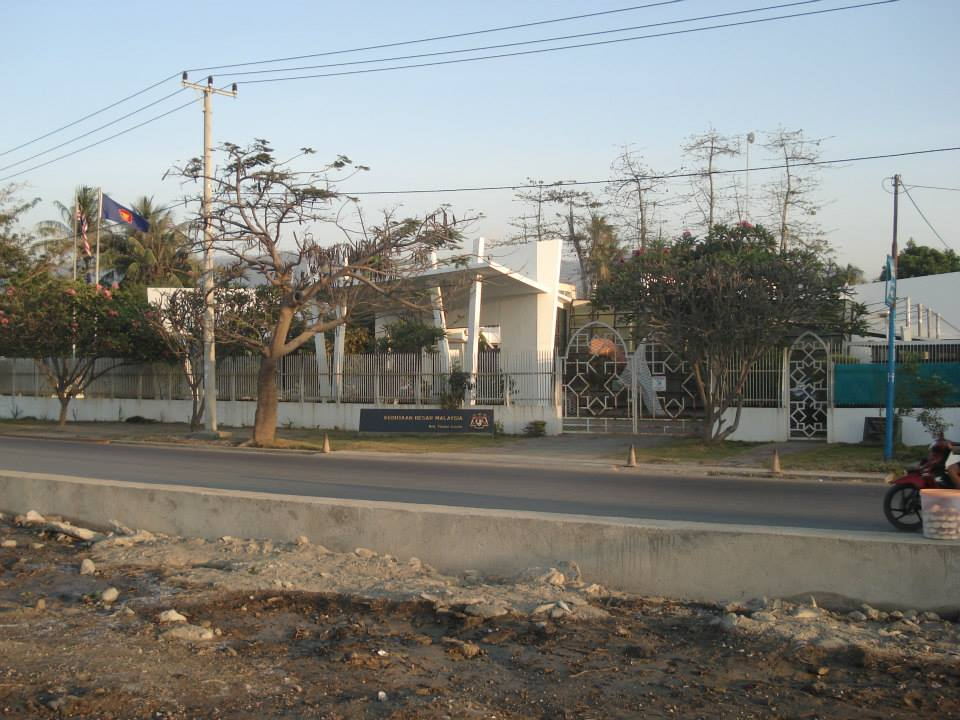
Embassy of Malaysia

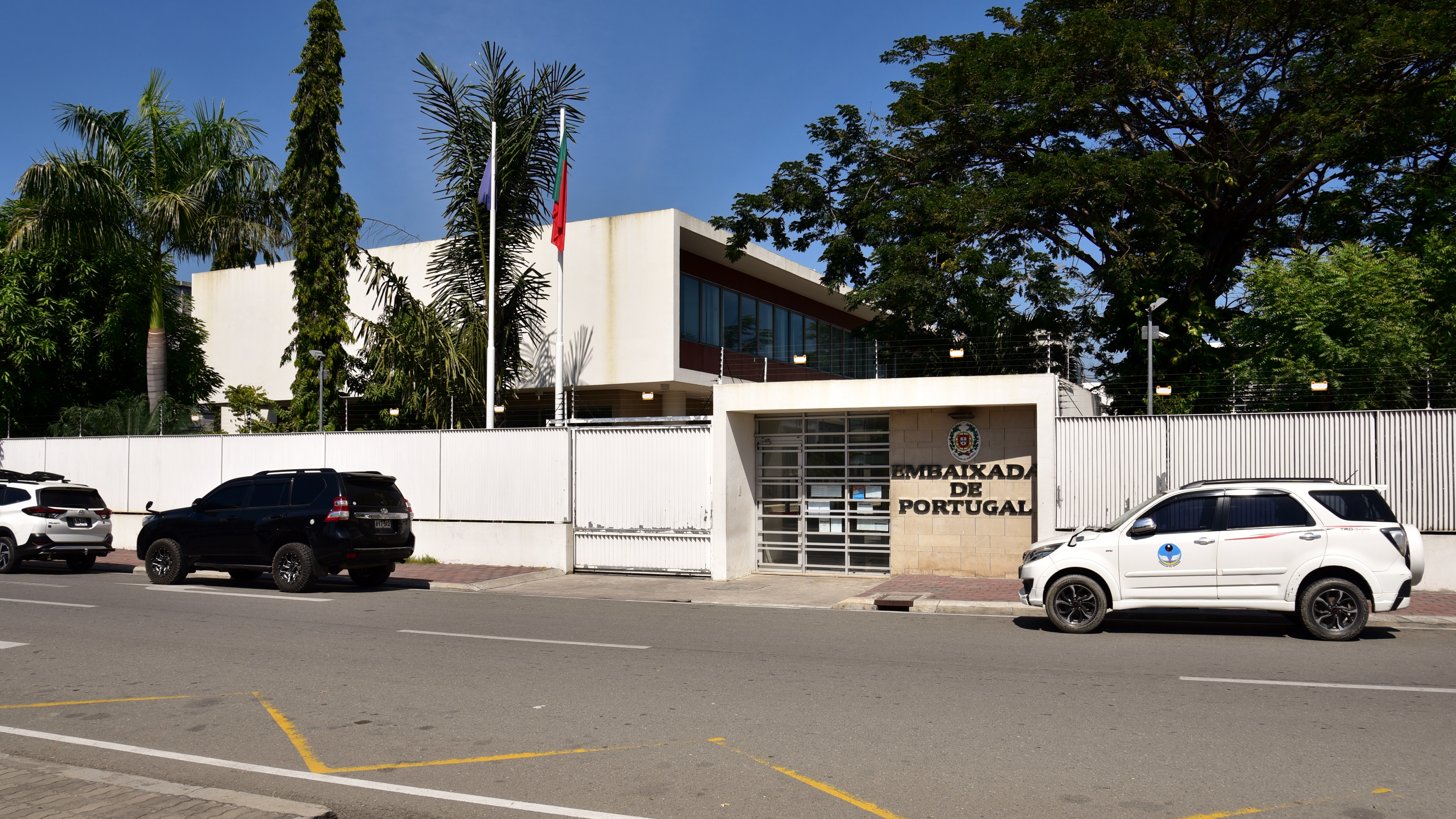
Embassy of Portugal

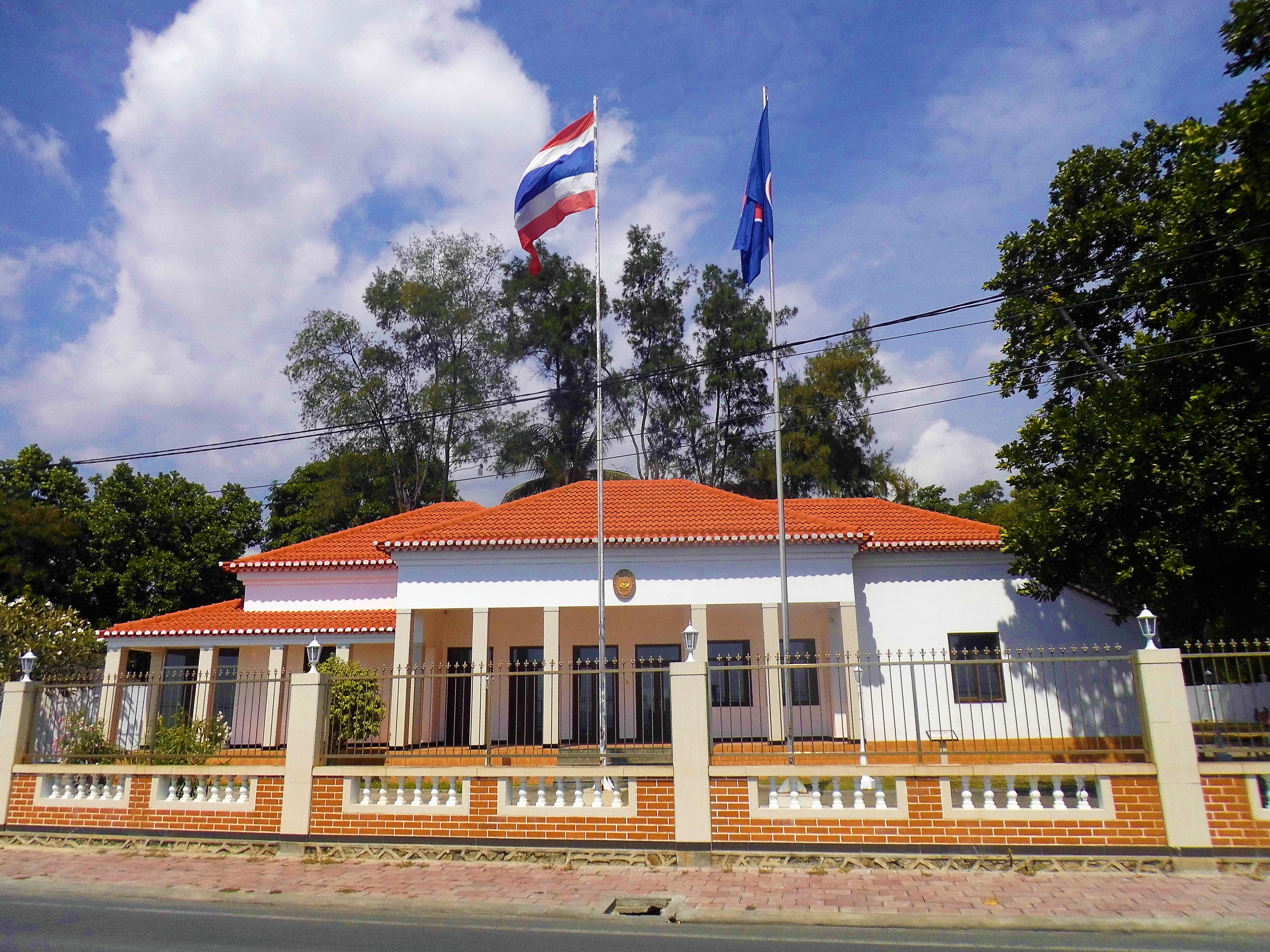
Embassy of Thailand

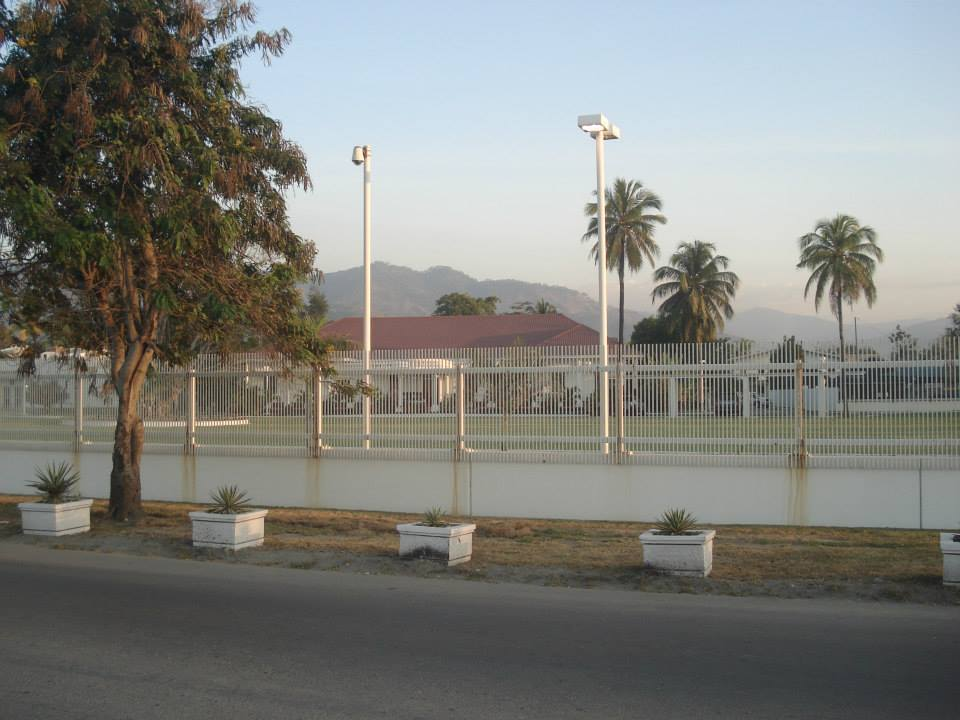
Embassy of the United States

== Embassy branch office ==
=== Pante Macassar ===
- Indonesia

== Accredited non-resident embassies ==
=== Resident in Beijing, China ===
1. Chad
2. Dominican Republic
3. Guinea-Bissau

=== Resident in Canberra, Australia ===
1. Algeria
2. Kenya
3. Kosovo
4. Lithuania
5. Palestine
6. Uruguay

=== Resident in Jakarta, Indonesia ===
1. Argentina
2. Armenia
3. Austria
4. Azerbaijan
5. Bahrain
6. Belgium
7. Bosnia and Herzegovina
8. Bulgaria
9. Canada
10. Chile
11. Colombia
12. Croatia
13. Cyprus
14. Czechia
15. Denmark
16. Egypt
17. Ethiopia
18. Fiji
19. Finland
20. France
21. Georgia
22. Germany
23. Guatemala
24. Hungary
25. Iran
26. Ireland
27. Italy
28. Kuwait
29. Laos
30. Mexico
31. Mongolia
32. Mozambique
33. Myanmar
34. Netherlands
35. Nigeria
36. Norway
37. Pakistan
38. Papua New Guinea
39. Peru
40. Poland
41. Qatar
42. Russia
43. Saudi Arabia
44. Serbia
45. Slovakia
46. South Africa
47. Spain
48. Sri Lanka
49. Sweden
50. Switzerland
51. Turkey
52. United Arab Emirates
53. United Kingdom
54. Zimbabwe

=== Resident in Kuala Lumpur, Malaysia ===
1. Ghana
2. Namibia
3. Nepal
4. Ukraine

=== Resident in Singapore ===
1. Bangladesh
2. Greece
3. Israel
4. Venezuela

=== Resident in other cities ===
1. Iceland (Reykjavík)
2. Malta (Rome)
3. Nicaragua (Hanoi)
4. Uganda (Tokyo)

== Closed missions ==
Host city	Sending country	Mission	Year closed	Ref.
Dili	United Kingdom	Embassy (Note: To be re-opened.)	2007	
Dili	Ireland	Representative office	2011	

== Missions to open ==
Host city	Sending country	Mission	Ref.
Dili
Dili	Laos	Embassy	
Dili	Myanmar	Embassy	
Dili	Papua New Guinea	Embassy	
Dili	Russia	Embassy	
Dili	United Kingdom	Embassy	

== See also ==
- Foreign relations of Timor-Leste
- List of diplomatic missions of Timor-Leste
