= List of diplomatic missions of Timor-Leste =

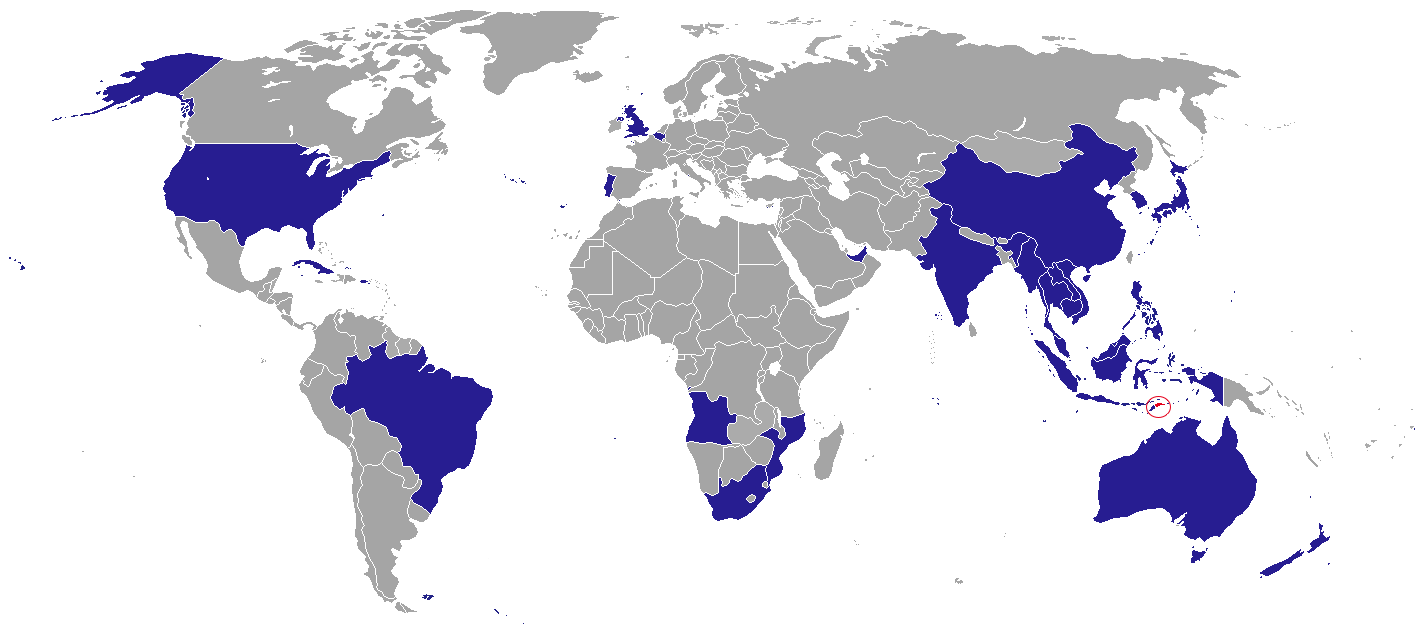
Countries with East Timorese diplomatic missions

The Democratic Republic of Timor-Leste, also commonly known as Timor-Leste and East Timor, has a very modest network of diplomatic and consular missions. Most of them are located in countries which composed the Portuguese colonial empire, as well as in all 10 member-states of the Association of Southeast Asian Nations (ASEAN), to which the country was officially admitted as the eleventh member on 26 October 2025.

Honorary consulates are not included in this listing.

== Africa ==
Host country	Host city	Mission	Concurrent accreditation	Ref.
Angola	Luanda	Embassy		
Mozambique	Maputo	Embassy		
South Africa	Pretoria	Embassy		

== Americas ==
Host country	Host city	Mission	Concurrent accreditation	Ref.
Brazil	Brasília	Embassy	Countries: Colombia	
Cuba	Havana	Embassy		
United States	Washington, D.C.	Embassy	Countries: Canada; Mexico	

== Asia ==
Host country	Host city	Mission	Concurrent accreditation	Ref.
Brunei	Bandar Seri Begawan	Embassy		
Cambodia	Phnom Penh	Embassy		
China	Beijing	Embassy		
India	New Delhi	Embassy		
Indonesia	Jakarta	Embassy		
Indonesia	Denpasar	Consulate-General		
Indonesia	Kupang	Consulate		
Indonesia	Atambua	Consular Agency		
Japan	Tokyo	Embassy		
Laos	Vientiane	Embassy		
Malaysia	Kuala Lumpur	Embassy		
Myanmar	Yangon	Embassy		
Philippines	Manila	Embassy		
Singapore	Singapore	Embassy		
South Korea	Seoul	Embassy		
Thailand	Bangkok	Embassy		
United Arab Emirates	Abu Dhabi	Embassy		
Vietnam	Hanoi	Embassy		

== Europe ==
Host country	Host city	Mission	Concurrent accreditation	Ref.
Belgium	Brussels	Embassy	Countries: Czechia; France; Germany; Luxembourg; Poland; International Organizations: European Union; UNESCO	
Holy See (Note: The East Timorese Embassy to the Holy See is located outside Vatican territory in Rome.)	Rome	Embassy	International Organizations: Food and Agriculture Organization	
Portugal	Lisbon	Embassy	Countries: Cape Verde; Spain	
United Kingdom	London	Embassy	Countries: Ireland; Netherlands; International Organizations: Organisation for the Prohibition of Chemical Weapons	
United Kingdom	Belfast	Consulate-General	Countries: Ireland; Netherlands; International Organizations: Organisation for the Prohibition of Chemical Weapons	

== Oceania ==
Host country	Host city	Mission	Concurrent accreditation	Ref.
Australia	Canberra	Embassy		
Australia	Darwin	Consulate-General		
Australia	Sydney	Consulate-General		
New Zealand	Wellington	Embassy		

== Multilateral organisations ==
Organization	Host city	Host country	Mission	Concurrent accreditation	Ref.
Association of Southeast Asian Nations	Jakarta	Indonesia	Permanent Mission		
Community of Portuguese Language Countries	Lisbon	Portugal	Permanent Mission		
United Nations	New York City	United States	Permanent Mission	Countries: Guatemala; Serbia	
United Nations	Geneva	Switzerland	Permanent Mission	Countries: Austria; Monaco; Switzerland; International Organizations: International Atomic Energy Agency	

== Gallery ==
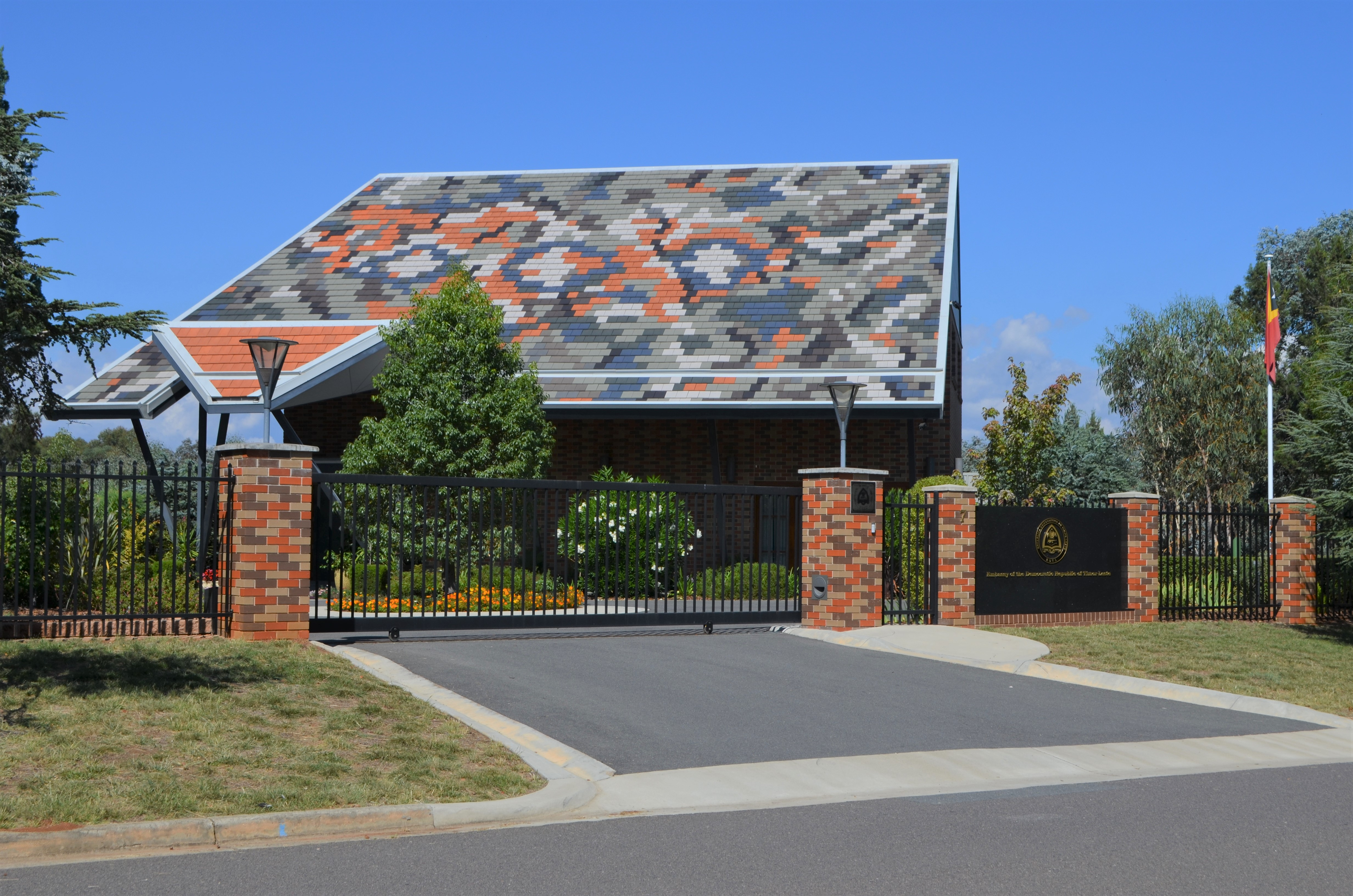
Embassy in Canberra

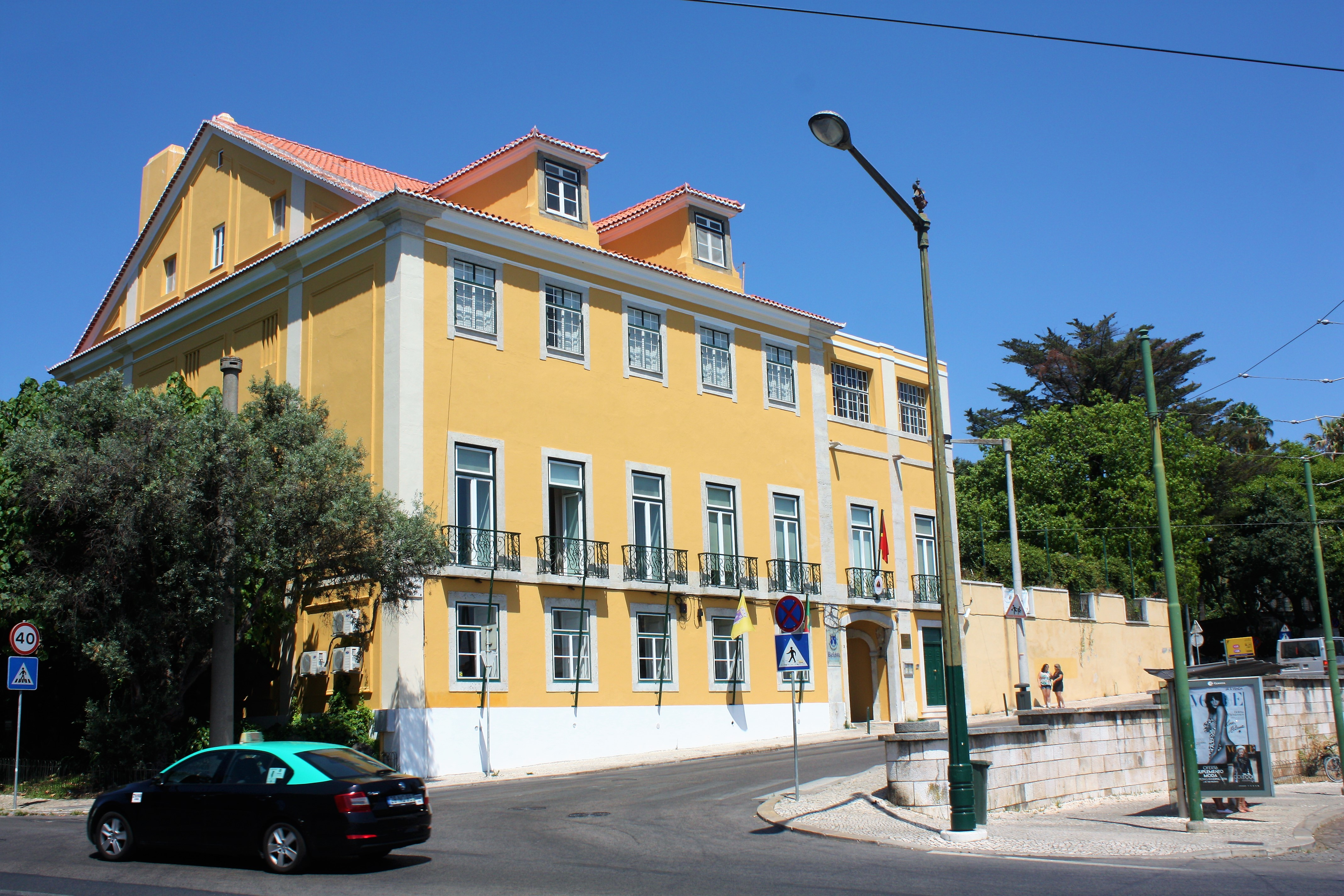
Embassy in Lisbon

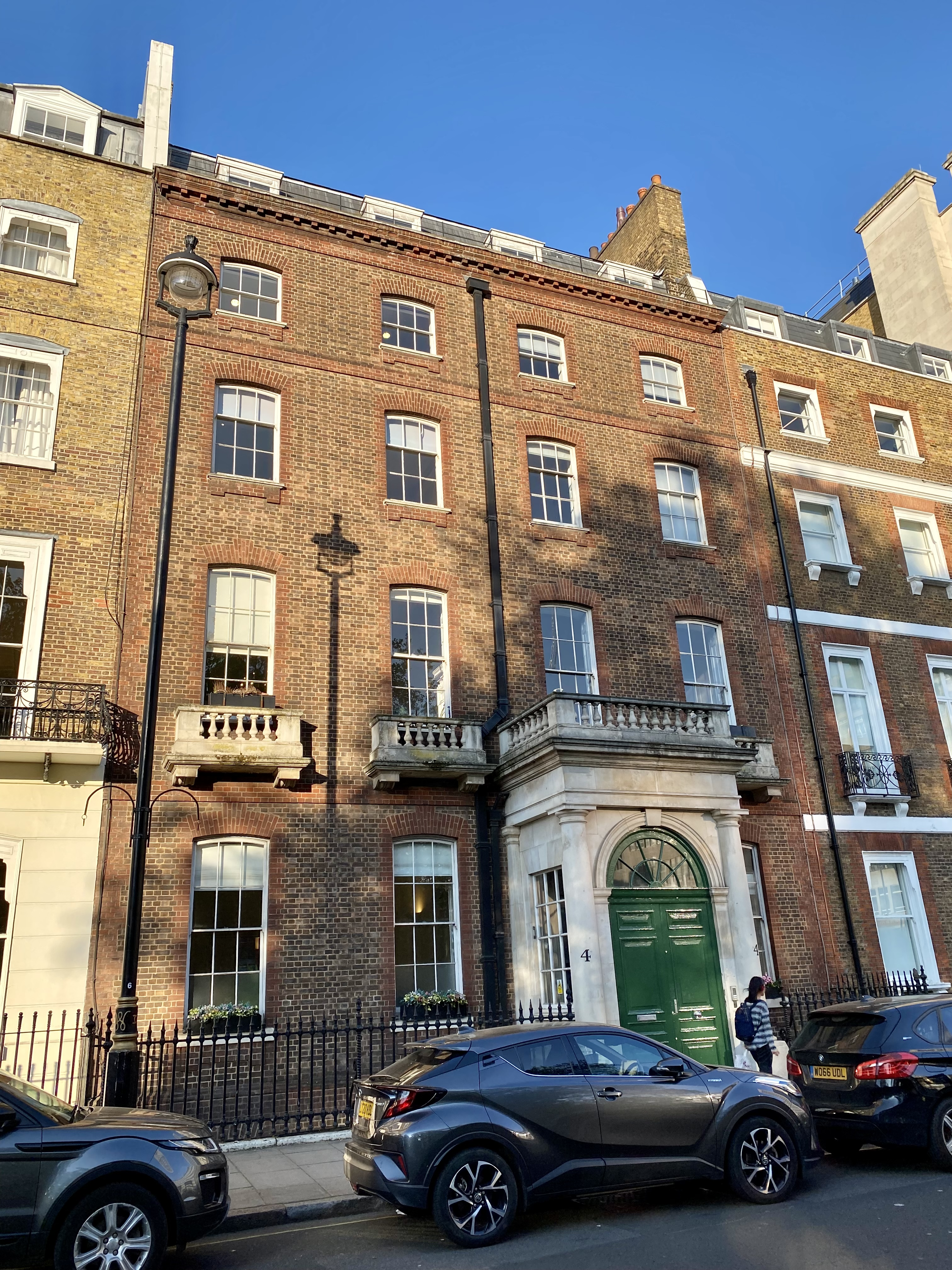
Embassy in London

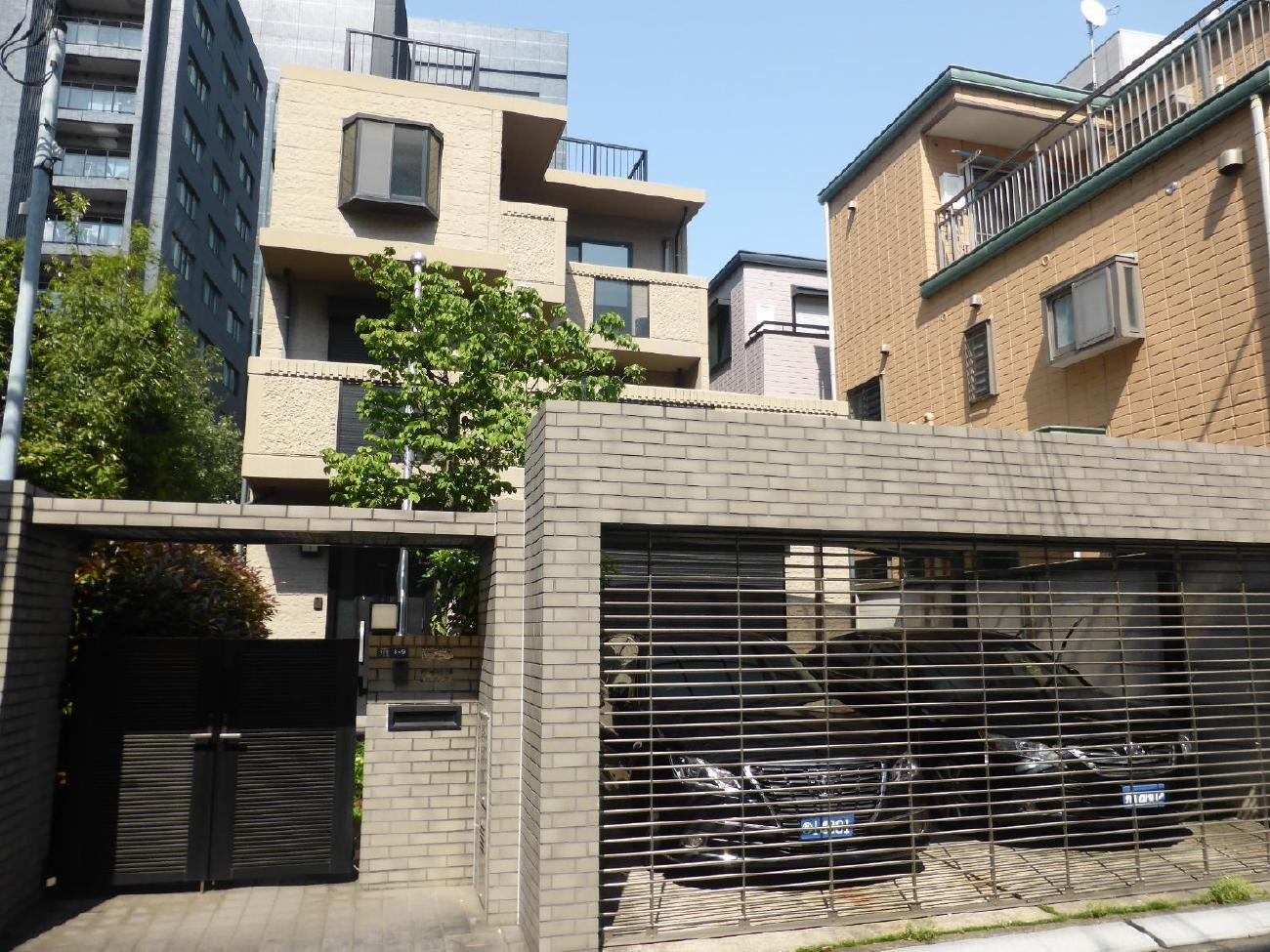
Embassy in Tokyo

== Mission to open ==
Host country	Host city	Mission	Ref.
France	Paris	Embassy	
Germany	Berlin	Embassy	
Papua New Guinea	Port Moresby	Embassy	
Russia	Moscow	Embassy	

== See also ==
- Foreign relations of Timor-Leste
- List of diplomatic missions in Timor-Leste
- Visa policy of Timor-Leste
