= Timor-Leste passport =

Passport issued to citizens of Timor-Leste

East Timorese passport
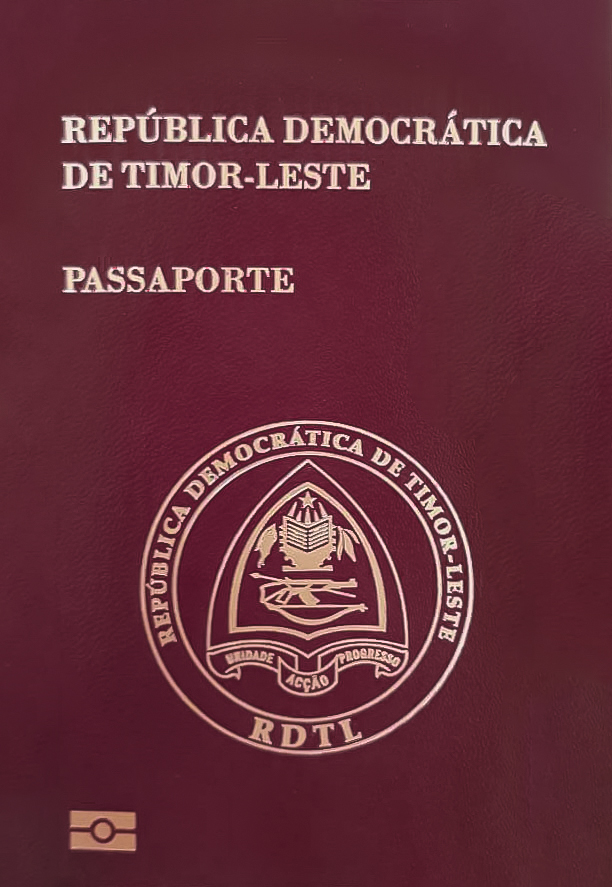
- The front cover of an East Timorese biometric passport.
- Type: Passport
- Issued by: Timor-Leste
- First issued: 2002 (non-biometric); 6 June 2017 (biometric)
- Purpose: Identification
- Eligibility: East Timorese citizenship

Timor-Leste passports are issued to citizens of Timor-Leste to travel internationally. They are issued by the government through the Ministry of the Interior. Until the United Nations Transitional Administration in East Timor finished its transitional work, residents had to use a United Nations (UN) travel document to visit other countries until 2002, when the country officially became independent from UN control.

== Description ==
Passports are normally valid for adult citizens for five years; minors may receive a passport for shorter periods, depending on the rules. There are three types: Ordinary, for personal travel; Diplomatic, for diplomats and senior officials; and Official, for government officials on official assignments overseas.

As of 2026, visas are not required for passport holders in 61 or 66 countries.

== Security measures ==
In December 2007, Timor-Leste, in partnership with the International Organization for Migration of the UN, replaced its manual data entry with a modern digital, machine-readable passport system, making tampering much more difficult and giving the government easier access to data.

The country began to issue biometric passports on 6 June 2017. Biodata in the passport consists of "the holder's photograph, personal details, passport number, nationality, and a machine-readable zone used in immigration processing." Security features include "security printing, patterned backgrounds, ultraviolet security elements, microtext, specialized printing techniques, and tamper-resistant materials."

== See also ==
- List of passports
- Visa requirements for East Timorese citizens
