= Bruneian passport =

Passport of Brunei issued to Bruneian citizens

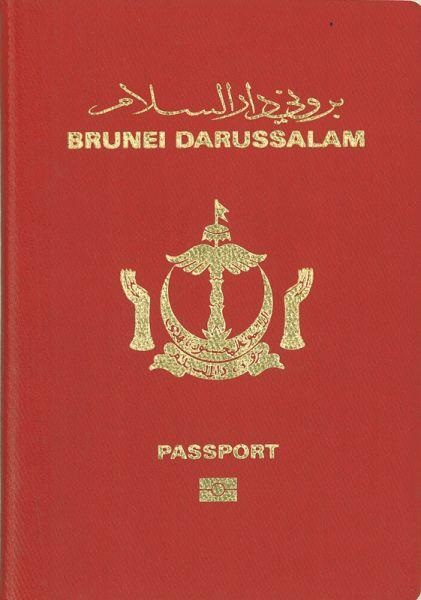
- Front cover of the current Brunei passport (with chip), issued since May 2008
- Type: Passport
- Issued by: Brunei
- First issued: 5 May 2008 (biometric version)
- Purpose: Identification
- Eligibility: Bruneian citizenship
- Expiration: 5 years

Bruneian passport is a travel document issued to citizens of Brunei which is valid for a period of five years and must have at least six months of remaining validity for overseas travel. Since May 2008, all issued passports are biometric. For permanent residents of Brunei who are stateless, the government issues a Bruneian International Certificate of Identity as a travel document for them. in 2025, Bruneian passport ranked 18th in the world according to the Henley Passport Index with visa-free or visa-on-arrival access to 164 countries and one of only two Muslim-majority nations in the world, alongside Qatar, whose citizens are permitted to enter the United States without a visa.

== Validity ==
The Bruneian passport is valid for a period of 5 years. To travel overseas, a passport must be valid for at least six months into the future.

== Biometric passport ==
The Bruneian passport is coloured red. Brunei's coat of arms is in the middle of the front of the Bruneian passport, with the name of the country above it and "passport" below it. The identification page contains a passport holder photo, type ("P" for passport), code of the country, serial number of the passport, surname and first name of the passport holder, citizenship, date of birth (DD.MM.YYYY), gender (M for men or F for women), place of birth, date of issue (DD.MM.YYYY), passport holder's signature, and expiry date (DD.MM.YYYY). The data page/information page is printed in Jawi and English.

Since May 2008, all Bruneian passports contain biometric features. The biometric passport contains a chip which stores facial and fingerprint image.

== Certificate of Identity ==
In lieu of a passport, Bruneian permanent residents who are otherwise stateless are afforded the right to obtain a Bruneian International Certificate of Identity.

== Visa requirements ==
Countries and territories with visa-free entries or visas on arrival for holders of regular Bruneian passports

As of 2025, Bruneian citizens have visa-free or visa on arrival access to 164 countries and territories, ranking the Bruneian passport 18th in the world according to the Henley Passport Index. Additionally, Arton Capital's Passport index ranked the Bruneian passport 17th in the world in terms of travel freedom, with a visa-free score of 154, as of October 2026. Brunei is one of only two Muslim-majority countries in the world, along with Qatar, whose citizens are allowed to enter the United States without a previously issued travel visa.

== See also ==
- Visa requirements for Bruneian citizens
