= Visa policy of Timor-Leste =

Policy on permits required to enter Timor-Leste

Most visitors to Timor-Leste must obtain a visa on arrival unless they are citizens from one of the visa-exempt countries.

In April 2019, the Interior Minister adopted an Order number 470 to be applied from 1 May 2019, requiring all non-visa-exempt visitors to obtain a visa from one of the Timor-Leste diplomatic missions before arrival. However, this decision was subsequently suspended.

== Visa policy map ==
Visa policy of Timor-Leste Timor-Leste Visa not required (90 days) Visa not required (30 days) Visa on arrival at Dili airport or seaport only

== Visa exemption ==
=== Ordinary passports ===
Citizens of the following countries and territories may enter Timor-Leste without a visa for the following period:

90 days within any 180 days

- European Union member states (except Ireland)
- All European Free Trade Association member states

30 days

- Cape Verde
- Indonesia
- Laos
- Malaysia
- Singapore
- Thailand

Date of visa changes
- 15 June 2010: Cuba (diplomatic, official and service passports)
- 15 April 2015: Cape Verde
- 26 May 2015: Schengen Area member states
- 24 June 2015: China (travelling on duty, diplomatic, official and service passports)
- 19 September 2019: Indonesia
- 5 September 2022: Cambodia (diplomatic, official and service passports)
- 3 July 2024: Singapore, Thailand, Brunei (diplomatic, official and service passports)
- 2 October 2024: India, Philippines, (Note: Under visa agreement on 26 August 2024) Vietnam (diplomatic, official and service passports)
- 8 October 2024: Laos (diplomatic, official and service passports)
- 15 August 2025: Laos
- 16 August 2025: Malaysia
- 15 October 2025: Angola (diplomatic and service passports)

=== Non-ordinary passports ===
- Citizens of Angola, Brunei, Cambodia, Cuba, India, Mainland China, Philippines and Vietnam holding a diplomatic, official or service passport may enter Timor-Leste without a valid visa for up to 30 days.
- Citizens of mainland China holding a passport endorsed for “public affairs” may enter Timor-Leste without a valid visa for up to 30 days.
- In addition, all holders of a United Nations Passport or Interpol Passport may enter Timor-Leste without a valid visa for up to 90 days.

=== Future changes ===
Timor-Leste has signed visa exemption agreements with the following countries, but they have not yet entered into force:

Country	Passports	Agreement signed on
Vietnam	Ordinary	9 June 2026

== Land border arrivals ==
Visitors and long-term visa holders are able to enter (and exit) Timor-Leste through the land border in Batugade. This includes Visas on Arrival, which are USD30 per person and valid for 30 days (extendable one time in-country). Batugade is accessible by air through the airport in Atambua or by land with buses from other destinations in West Timor, such as Kupang. Visitors who are exempt from a visa (such as citizens from a Schengen country) do not need a visa at any land border crossing.

== Visa on arrival ==
Citizens of all other countries which are not visa-exempt may apply for a visa on arrival at the Presidente Nicolau Lobato International Airport or at the Dili Sea Port. If other conditions are met a single entry visa valid for up to 30 days is granted for fee of USD30. Transit visas are available for stays less than 3 days for fee of USD20. There is no visa-free transit option.

== Prior application ==
A visa application may be submitted at one of the Timor-Leste diplomatic missions prior to arrival.

== Requirements on arrival ==
Aside from holding a passport valid for not less than 6 months from the date of entry all travellers also must meet strict conditions to be allowed entry to Timor-Leste:

- Intention of a genuine visit (as tourist or business trip).
- Accommodation arrangements and a return or onward ticket.
- US$150 per day expected to remain in the country (for tourist or business visas).
- US$100 plus US$50 per day (for transit visas).

== Visa extension ==
All nationals with a visa may extend their stay to a total cumulative stay of 90 days by submitting their application to the Immigration Department. The fees are US$35 for a 30-day extension, or US$75 for an extension between 30 and 60 days.

== Visitor statistics ==
Most visitors arriving in Timor-Leste by air were from the following countries of nationality:

Rank	Country	2014	2013	2012	2011
1	Indonesia	15,180	17,520	15,303	11,179
2	Australia	13,429	12,817	12,138	12,419
3	Portugal	6,185	5,894	6,130	5,916
4	Philippines	4,157	3,936	3,842	2,413
5	China	3,717	4,346	4,972	3,464
6	United States	1,666	2,130	2,211	2,207
7	Malaysia	1,665	1,455	1,944	1,829
8	Singapore	1,465	1,457	1,381	1,519
9	Japan	1,458	1,438	1,211	1,232
10	New Zealand	896	737	815	711
	Total	59,811	77,135	57,517	50,590

== See also ==
- Visa requirements for East Timorese citizens
