= Foreign relations of Brunei =

Brunei maintains diplomatic relations with 171 out of 193 countries, joined ASEAN on 7 January 1984, one week after resuming full independence, and gives its ASEAN membership the highest priority in its foreign relations. Brunei joined the United Nations in September 1984. It is also a member of the Organisation of Islamic Cooperation (OIC), the Asia-Pacific Economic Cooperation (APEC) forum and the Commonwealth of Nations. Brunei hosted the APEC Economic Leaders' Meeting in November 2000. In 2005 it attended the inaugural East Asia Summit.

Brunei has a number of diplomatic missions abroad and has close relations with Singapore, sharing an interchangeable currency regime as well as close military relations with the latter island-state. Aside from relations with other ASEAN states, of which the Philippines, Indonesia, and Malaysia are key partners, Brunei also has extensive relations with the Muslim world and the Arab world outside its own region.

== International organizations ==
Brunei became a member state of the Commonwealth in 1984, ASEAN and the Organisation of Islamic Cooperation in 1984, the 7th member of the ASEAN-Japan Centre in 1990, the 159th United Nations member on 21 September 1985, a major player in BIMP-EAGA in 1994, and a founding member of the World Trade Organization (WTO) in 1995. Since 2009, Brunei and the Philippines signed a memorandum of understanding (MOU) that seeks to strengthen the bilateral co-operation of the two countries in the fields of agriculture and farm-related trade and investments.

== Diplomatic relations ==
List of countries which Brunei maintains diplomatic relations with:

#	Country	Date
1	Australia	1 January 1984
2	Chile	1 January 1984
3	Indonesia	1 January 1984
4	Malaysia	1 January 1984
5	Philippines	1 January 1984
6	Singapore	1 January 1984
7	South Korea	1 January 1984
8	Thailand	1 January 1984
9	United Kingdom	1 January 1984
10	Germany	30 January 1984
11	Nepal	3 February 1984
12	Pakistan	9 February 1984
13	United States	10 March 1984
14	Oman	24 March 1984
15	Maldives	31 March 1984
16	Japan	2 April 1984
17	Sri Lanka	3 April 1984
18	Papua New Guinea	1 May 1984
19	Egypt	2 May 1984
20	Belgium	3 May 1984
21	Bangladesh	5 May 1984
22	New Zealand	5 May 1984
23	Canada	7 May 1984
24	France	8 May 1984
25	India	10 May 1984
26	Brazil	8 June 1984
27	Turkey	27 June 1984
28	Spain	June 1984
29	Norway	12 October 1984
30	Switzerland	November 1984
31	Yemen	28 December 1984
32	Sweden	1984
33	Denmark	24 January 1985
34	Jordan	18 February 1985
35	Italy	15 April 1985
36	Netherlands	21 April 1985
37	Austria	2 December 1985
38	Greece	6 May 1986
39	Ireland	6 May 1986
40	Malta	15 August 1986
41	Saudi Arabia	1 July 1987
42	Morocco	28 May 1988
43	Bahrain	24 September 1988
44	Finland	11 November 1988
45	Iran	1 May 1990
46	Iraq	1 May 1990
47	Kuwait	1 May 1990
48	Mali	1 May 1990
49	Niger	1 May 1990
50	Seychelles	1 May 1990
51	Tonga	1 May 1990
52	Tunisia	1 May 1990
53	Peru	1 June 1990
54	Guyana	20 June 1990
55	Mauritius	2 July 1990
56	China	30 September 1991
57	Russia	1 October 1991
58	Mexico	2 October 1991
59	Qatar	2 October 1991
60	Senegal	25 November 1991
61	Ghana	10 December 1991
62	Honduras	20 December 1991
63	Burkina Faso	21 January 1992
64	Hungary	21 January 1992
65	Federated States of Micronesia	23 February 1992
66	Vietnam	29 February 1992
67	Czech Republic	2 March 1992
68	Colombia	24 March 1992
69	Argentina	24 April 1992
70	Eswatini	11 May 1992
71	Mongolia	18 May 1992
72	Solomon Islands	21 May 1992
73	United Arab Emirates	28 May 1992
74	Cambodia	9 June 1992
75	San Marino	10 June 1992
76	Madagascar	20 October 1992
77	Nigeria	1 December 1992
78	Laos	27 July 1993
79	Myanmar	21 September 1993
80	Bosnia and Herzegovina	25 January 1994
81	Albania	27 January 1994
82	Benin	1 March 1994
83	Bulgaria	14 April 1994
84	Costa Rica	14 April 1994
85	Romania	15 April 1994
86	Lebanon	18 May 1994
—	State of Palestine	3 June 1994
87	Ivory Coast	3 June 1994
88	Guinea-Bissau	3 June 1994
89	Zimbabwe	7 September 1994
90	Uruguay	19 September 1994
91	Algeria	24 January 1995
92	Sierra Leone	10 July 1995
93	Azerbaijan	24 November 1995
94	Marshall Islands	17 January 1996
95	Kyrgyzstan	15 March 1996
96	Poland	20 March 1996
97	Portugal	22 March 1996
98	Panama	28 March 1996
99	Paraguay	8 April 1996
100	Slovakia	4 June 1996
101	Mozambique	18 June 1996
102	Uzbekistan	20 June 1996
103	Namibia	27 June 1996
104	South Africa	4 October 1996
105	Cyprus	6 November 1996
106	Cuba	4 April 1997
107	Slovenia	28 April 1997
108	Gabon	June 1997
109	Ukraine	3 October 1997
110	Croatia	1 May 1998
111	Nicaragua	July 1998
112	Sudan	August 1998
113	North Korea	7 January 1999
114	Comoros	16 February 1999
115	Suriname	22 February 1999
116	Turkmenistan	22 February 1999
117	Lesotho	30 March 2000
118	Republic of the Congo	15 May 2000
119	Kazakhstan	14 June 2000
120	Latvia	14 July 2000
121	El Salvador	28 August 2000
122	Tanzania	6 October 2000
123	Malawi	11 October 2000
124	Ecuador	19 March 2001
125	Lithuania	27 April 2001
126	Armenia	15 April 2002
127	Timor-Leste	20 May 2002
128	Syria	31 August 2002
129	Belarus	4 November 2002
130	Togo	3 December 2002
131	Zambia	3 February 2003
132	Luxembourg	18 July 2003
133	Uganda	21 October 2003
134	Eritrea	13 May 2004
135	Tajikistan	2 June 2004
136	Guatemala	30 June 2004
137	Venezuela	13 July 2005
138	Samoa	8 February 2006
139	Libya	15 March 2005
140	Iceland	27 April 2006
141	Estonia	1 May 2006
142	Angola	18 October 2006
143	Moldova	18 October 2006
144	Afghanistan	14 February 2007
145	North Macedonia	1 August 2007
146	Guinea	8 August 2007
147	Mauritania	23 October 2007
148	Kenya	11 August 2008
149	Grenada	29 January 2009
150	Trinidad and Tobago	24 November 2009
151	Antigua and Barbuda	21 December 2009
152	Montenegro	18 January 2010
153	Georgia	1 March 2010
154	Dominican Republic	10 August 2010
155	Fiji	25 April 2011
156	Andorra	16 June 2011
157	Jamaica	20 June 2011
158	Monaco	22 June 2011
159	Liechtenstein	25 November 2011
160	Serbia	5 December 2011
161	Palau	16 December 2011
162	Djibouti	9 November 2012
163	Saint Vincent and the Grenadines	27 May 2015
164	Gambia	21 January 2016
165	Kiribati	26 January 2016
166	Bahamas	21 November 2016
—	Kosovo	20 February 2017
167	Saint Kitts and Nevis	21 February 2017
168	Dominica	22 January 2020
169	Rwanda	9 December 2020
170	Bhutan	13 July 2026
171	Chad	Unknown

== Bilateral relations ==
Country	Formal relations began	Notes
Australia	1 January 1984	Main article: Australia–Brunei relations Australia and Brunei Darussalam enjoy a warm, and increasingly diverse bilateral relationship. Australian servicemen liberated Brunei from Japanese occupation in June 1945. A memorial marking this event can be found at Muara Beach and is the venue for the annual ANZAC Day ceremony organised by the High Commission. Both countries are also participating in the Trans Pacific Partnership (TPP) negotiations which commenced in 2010, with participants aiming to conclude an agreement which will serve as a building block for Asia Pacific economic integration. Brunei has a High Commission in Canberra, and Australia has one in Bandar Seri Begawan. Both countries are full members of the Commonwealth of Nations. Relations between the two countries were established in 1984 when Australia became one of the first countries to establish diplomatic ties with Brunei.
Cambodia	9 June 1992	Main article: Brunei–Cambodia relations Brunei has an embassy in Phnom Penh, and Cambodia has an embassy in Bandar Seri Begawan. Relations were established on 9 June 1992.
Canada	1 January 1984	Main article: Brunei–Canada relations Canada established diplomatic relations with Brunei Darussalam on 7 May 1984, following Brunei's independence. Brunei has a High Commission in Ottawa, and Canada has a High Commission in Bandar Seri Begawan. Like Brunei, Canada is a full member of the Commonwealth of Nations..
China	30 September 1991	Both countries established diplomatic relations on 30 September 1991 Main article: Brunei–China relations Brunei has an embassy in Beijing, and China has an embassy in Bandar Seri Begawan. Relations can be traced back to over 2,000 years ago, as early as the Western Han periods.
France	8 May 1984	Main article: Brunei–France relations Brunei has an embassy in Paris, and France has an embassy in Bandar Seri Begawan. Relations between the two countries have been established since 8 May 1984.
Germany	30 January 1984	Main article: Brunei–Germany relations Brunei has an embassy in Berlin, and Germany has an embassy in Bandar Seri Begawan. Relations between the two countries has been established since 1 May 1984.
India	10 May 1984	Main article: Brunei–India relations Brunei has a High Commission in New Delhi, and India has a High Commission in Bandar Seri Begawan. Both countries are full members of the Commonwealth of Nations. Relations have been established since 10 May 1984.
Indonesia	1 January 1984	Main article: Brunei–Indonesia relations Republic of Indonesia established diplomatic relations with Brunei Darussalam on 1 January 1984.
Iran	1 May 1990	
Japan	2 April 1984	Main article: Brunei–Japan relations Embassy of Japan in Bandar Seri Begawan Brunei has an embassy in Tokyo, and Japan has an embassy in Bandar Seri Begawan. Relations were established on 2 April 1984.
Laos	27 July 1993	Main article: Brunei–Laos relations Brunei has an embassy in Vientiane, and Laos has an embassy in Bandar Seri Begawan. Relations were established on 27 July 1993.
Malaysia	1 January 1984	Main article: Brunei–Malaysia relations Both countries established diplomatic relations since January 1984 with Brunei has a High Commission in Kuala Lumpur, and Malaysia has a High Commission in Bandar Seri Begawan. Like Brunei, Malaysia is a full member of the Commonwealth of Nations.
Mexico	2 October 1991	Both countries established diplomatic relations on 2 October 1991: Brunei is accredited to Mexico from its embassy in Washington, D.C.; Mexico is accredited to Brunei from its embassy in Singapore.
Myanmar	21 September 1993	Both countries established diplomatic relations on 21 September 1993 Main article: Brunei–Myanmar relations Brunei has an embassy in Yangon, and Myanmar has an embassy in Gadong. Relations were established on 21 September 1993.
New Zealand	5 May 1984	Main article: Brunei–New Zealand relations The Bruneian High Commission in Kuala Lumpur is accredited to New Zealand, while the New Zealand High Commission in Kuala Lumpur is cross-accredited to Brunei. Relations has been established since 5 May 1984 and have always been friendly and positive with such co-operation in education trade and defence.
North Korea	7 January 1999	In August 2013 Brunei's Foreign Affairs and Vice-Minister, Prince Mohamed Bolkiah arrived in Pyongyang. Brunei is represented in North Korea, through its embassy in Kuala Lumpur, Malaysia. North Korea established diplomatic relations with Brunei on 7 January 1999.
Oman	24 March 1984	Main article: Brunei–Oman relations Brunei has an embassy in Muscat, and Oman has an embassy in Bandar Seri Begawan. Relations has been established since 24 March 1984.
Pakistan	9 February 1984	Main article: Brunei–Pakistan relations Pakistan has a High Commission in Bandar Seri Begawan and Brunei has a High Commission in Islamabad. Pakistan initially hesitated to recognise the country at first since its close relations with Malaysia which what they considered as part of the Federation of Malaysia but later established relations on 9 February 1984 when Malaysia established relations with the country.
Philippines	1 January 1984	Main article: Brunei–Philippines relations Relations between Brunei and the natives of a then divided Philippines under a classical era started since the 10th to 13th centuries and continued even under the colonial regimes. Relations continued through the Sultanate of Sulu. Post World War II relations between the two countries has been re-established since January 1984. In April 2009, Brunei and The Philippines signed a memorandum of understanding (MOU) that seeks to strengthen the bilateral co-operation of the two countries in the fields of agriculture and farm-related trade and investments. The MOU further strengthened bilateral co-operation between the two Southeast Asian countries, particularly in the fields of agriculture and farm-related trade and investments. The two countries have agreed to co-operate in plant science, crops technology, vegetable and fruit preservation, biotechnology, post-harvest technology, livestock, organic agriculture, irrigation and water resources and Halal industry. Brunei is viewed by the Philippines as a key ASEAN and Islamic ally. While Brunei view the Philippines as an ASEAN and Christian ally with a Muslim minority.
Qatar	2 October 1991	Both countries established diplomatic relations on 2 October 1991 Main article: Brunei–Qatar relations Brunei has an embassy in Doha, and Qatar has an embassy in Bandar Seri Begawan.
Russia	1 October 1991	Both countries established diplomatic relations on 1 October 1991 Main article: Brunei–Russia relations Brunei maintains an embassy in Moscow, the Russian embassy in Brunei was established in March 2010.
Singapore	1 January 1984	Main article: Brunei–Singapore relations The official relations between the two countries have been established since 1984. Brunei and Singapore agreed to have Singapore train its armed forces with Brunei. Like Brunei, Singapore is a full member of the Commonwealth of Nations. Brunei and Singapore have a currency agreement that the currencies of both countries can be used in either of the two countries. The Brunei dollar and the Singapore dollar are maintained at par. In August 2005, Brunei's Foreign Affairs and Trade Minister, Prince Mohamed Bolkiah arrived in Singapore for a three-day visit during which the two countries signed an agreement to eliminate double taxation, paving the way for further bilateral trade and investment. The Royal Brunei Navy and the Republic of Singapore Navy conduct an annual Exercise Pelican signifying strong ties between the two navies.
South Korea	1 January 1984	Main article: Brunei–South Korea relations Brunei has an embassy in Seoul, and South Korea has an embassy in Bandar Seri Begawan. South Korea established diplomatic relations with Brunei on 1 June 1984 right after the country gained independence from the United Kingdom on 1 January on that year.
Thailand	1 January 1984	Main article: Brunei–Thailand relations Brunei has an embassy in Bangkok, and Thailand has an embassy in Bandar Seri Begawan. The relations have always been close and cordial.
United Kingdom	1 January 1984	Main article: Brunei–United Kingdom relations Prime Minister Keir Starmer with Bruneian Sultanate Hassanal Bolkiah in Downing Street, December 2024. Brunei established diplomatic relations with the United Kingdom on 1 January 1984.: Brunei maintains a high commission in London.; The United Kingdom is accredited to the Brunei through its high commission in Bandar Seri Begawan.; The UK governed Brunei from 1888 to 1984, when Brunei achieved full independence. Both countries share common membership of the Commonwealth, CPTPP, the United Nations, and the World Trade Organization. Bilaterally the two countries have a Double Taxation Agreement. The UK and Brunei have a long-standing and strong bilateral relationship, particularly on defence co-operation, trade and education. The UK continues to play a strong role in developing Brunei's oil and gas sector, and the Brunei Investment Agency is a significant investor in the UK, with their largest overseas operations in the City of London. The UK remains the destination of choice for Bruneian students, with about 1,220 of them enrolled in higher education in the UK in 2006–07. The Brunei royal family have strong ties to the UK, more specifically Birchwood, a suburb of Warrington.
United States	10 March 1984	Main article: Brunei–United States relations The US welcomed Brunei Darussalam's full independence from the United Kingdom on 1 January 1984, and opened an embassy in Bandar Seri Begawan on that date. Brunei opened its embassy in Washington, D.C. in March 1984. Brunei's armed forces engage in joint exercises, training programs, and other military co-operation with the USA memorandum of understanding on defence co-operation was signed on 29 November 1994. The Sultan of Brunei visited Washington in December 2002.
Vietnam	29 February 1992	Main article: Brunei–Vietnam relations Relations between the two countries have been established since 29 February 1992. Brunei has an embassy in Hanoi, and Vietnam has an embassy in Bandar Seri Begawan. Relations between the two countries have always been friendly especially in the political field.

== See also ==
- List of diplomatic missions in Brunei
- List of diplomatic missions of Brunei
- Visa requirements for Bruneian citizens
