= Ministry of Foreign Affairs (Brunei) =

Government ministry of Brunei

- Kementerian Hal Ehwal Luar Negeri
- Ministry of Foreign Affairs' logo

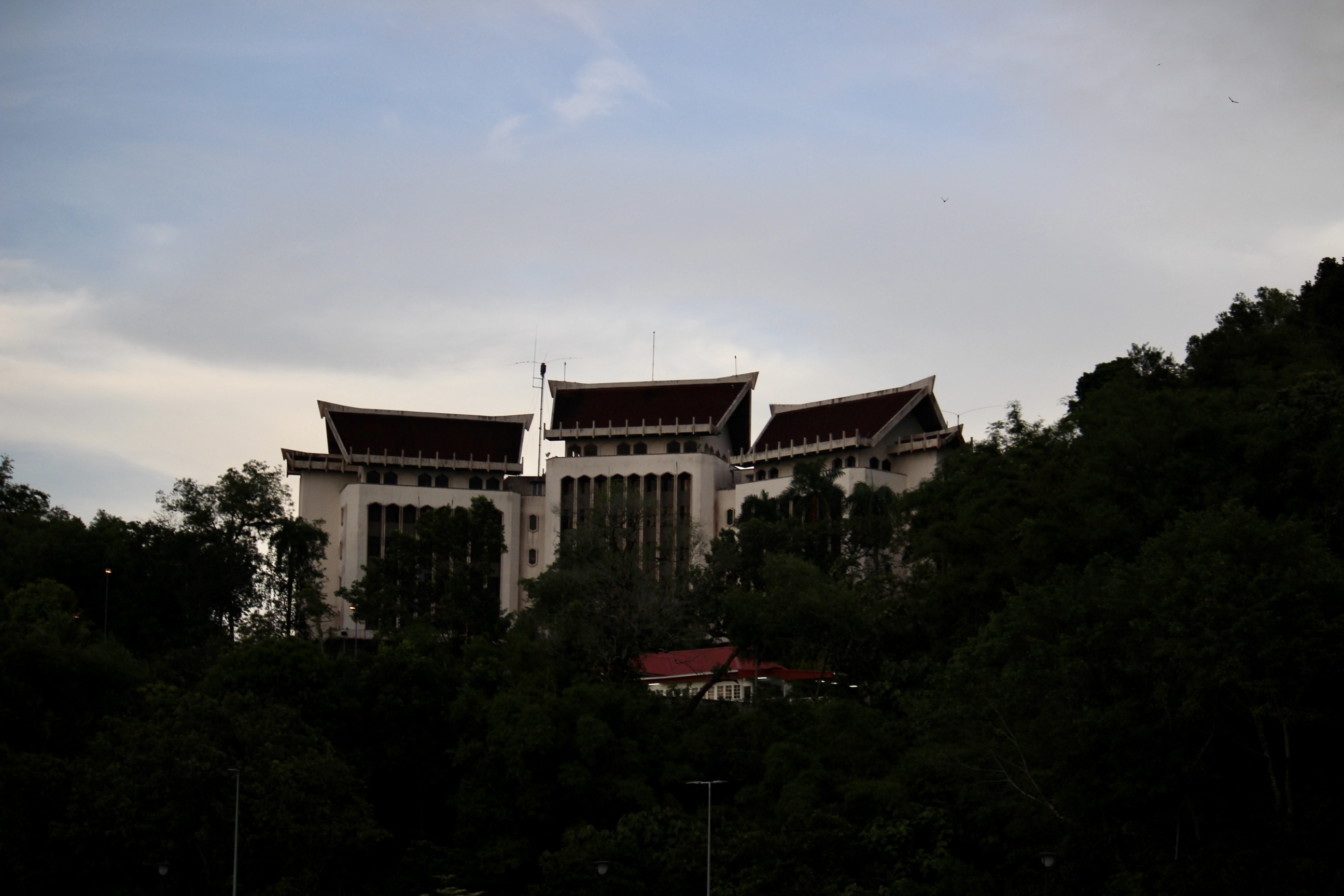
- Ministry of Foreign Affairs building

Ministry overview
- Formed: 1 January 1984; 42 years ago
- Jurisdiction: Government of Brunei and its diplomatic missions worldwide
- Headquarters: Bandar Seri Begawan, Brunei; 4°53′06″N 114°57′00″E
- Employees: 529 (2024)
- Annual budget: ▲B$127 million (2022)
- Ministers responsible: Prince Abdul Mateen, Minister of Foreign Affairs; Erywan Yusof (Note: The current official Malay name is Dato Seri Setia Awang Haji Erywan bin Pehin Datu Pekerma Jaya Haji Mohd. Yusof.), Second Minister of Foreign Affairs
- Website: www.mofat.gov.bn

The Ministry of Foreign Affairs (MFA; Malay: Kementerian Hal Ehwal Luar Negeri, KHELN), formerly known as the Ministry of Foreign Affairs and Trade (MOFAT), is the cabinet-level ministry in the government of Brunei which is responsible for handling Brunei's external relations, the management of its international diplomatic missions and the nation's foreign trade policy. It was established immediately upon Brunei's independence on 1 January 1984. It is currently led by a minister and a second minister, in which the incumbents are Prince Abdul Mateen and Erywan Yusof respectively. The ministry is headquartered in Bandar Seri Begawan.

== History ==
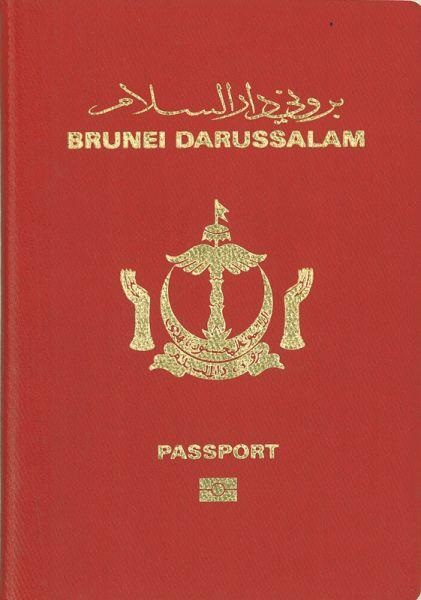
Bruneian passports are issued by the ministry

From 1888 until 1984, Brunei was a protectorate under British rule, but the nation began the foundations of a foreign ministry by creating a Diplomatic Service Department. After achieving full independence from the United Kingdom in January 1984, Brunei immediately established an independent foreign ministry, then known as the Ministry of Foreign Affairs.

In 2005, the government merged the ministry with the former International Relations and Trade Department of the Ministry of Industry and Primary Resources. The addition of "Foreign Trade" to the ministry's official name was made to reflect the full scope of its responsibilities. From 2005 until 2018, Lim Jock Seng was the Second Minister of Foreign Affairs & Trade. The current Second Minister is Erywan Yusof.

== Budget ==
In the fiscal year 2022–23, the ministry has been allocated with a budget of B$127 million (Note: ≈US$91 million as of July 2022), a 4.3 percent increase from the previous year.

== List of ministers ==
=== First minister ===
No.	Portrait	Minister	Term start	Term end	Time in office	Ref.
1		Mohamed Bolkiah	1 January 1984	22 October 2015	31 years, 294 days	
2		Hassanal Bolkiah	22 October 2015	4 June 2026	10 years, 225 days	
3		Abdul Mateen	4 June 2026	Incumbent	123 days	

=== Second minister ===
No.	Portrait	Minister	Term start	Term end	Time in office	Ref.
1		Lim Jock Seng	24 May 2005	30 January 2018	12 years, 251 days	
2		Erywan Yusof	30 January 2018	incumbent	8 years, 248 days	

=== Deputy minister ===
No.	Portrait	Minister	Term start	Term end	Time in office	Ref.
1		Zakaria Sulaiman	20 October 1986	1989	2–3 years	
2		Ali Mohammad Daud	1989	24 May 2005	15–16 years	
3		Erywan Yusof	22 October 2015	30 January 2018	2 years, 100 days	

== See also ==
- Foreign relations of Brunei
- Diplomatic missions of Brunei
