= List of diplomatic missions of Brunei =

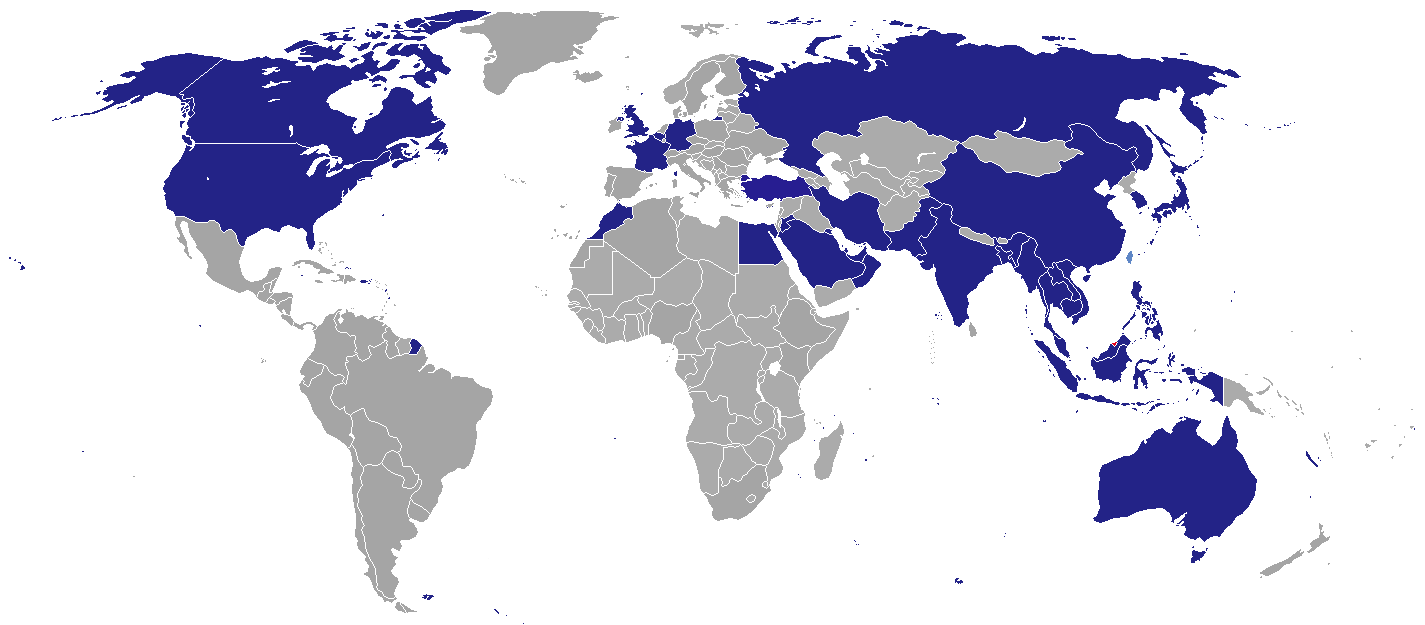
Diplomatic missions of Brunei

Brunei Darussalam's diplomatic missions and general foreign policy are managed by the Ministry of Foreign Affairs. It has a limited number of missions, most being concentrated in Southeast Asia and the Persian Gulf. As of 2021 the Bruneian diplomatic network is composed of 35 embassies and high commissions, 4 consulates general, 3 permanent missions to international organisations, and the trade and tourism office in Taipei, which serves as Brunei's de facto embassy to Taiwan.

As a member of the Commonwealth of Nations, Bruneian diplomatic missions in the capitals of other Commonwealth members are known as High Commissions.

Excluded from this listing are honorary consulates and trade missions, with the exception of the trade and tourism office in Taipei.

== History ==
Prior to full independence in 1984, Brunei was a British protectorate, with international representation being the responsibility of the United Kingdom, in which its interests were represented by the "Brunei Government Agency" in London. A Government Agency was also established in Kuala Lumpur, Malaysia, at the end of 1981. This was later renamed the Brunei Commission. When Brunei joined the Commonwealth on independence, these became known as High Commissions. In 1983, shortly before independence, the country established a Government Agency in Manila, in the Philippines, which was later upgraded to an Embassy.

== Africa ==
Host country	Host city	Mission	Concurrent accreditation	Ref.
Egypt	Cairo	Embassy	Countries: Algeria; Libya; Tunisia	
Morocco	Rabat	Embassy		

== America ==
Host country	Host city	Mission	Concurrent accreditation	Ref.
Canada	Ottawa	High Commission	Countries: Argentina; Brazil; Chile	
United States	Washington, D.C.	Embassy	Countries: Mexico; Peru	

== Asia ==
Host country	Host city	Mission	Concurrent accreditation	Ref.
Bahrain	Manama	Embassy		
Bangladesh	Dhaka	High Commission		
Cambodia	Phnom Penh	Embassy		
China	Beijing	Embassy	Countries: Mongolia; North Korea	
China	Hong Kong	Consulate General	Countries: Mongolia; North Korea	
India	New Delhi	High Commission	Countries: Nepal; Sri Lanka	
Indonesia	Jakarta	Embassy		
Iran	Tehran	Embassy		
Japan	Tokyo	Embassy		
Jordan	Amman	Embassy	Countries: Palestine; Yemen	
Kuwait	Kuwait City	Embassy		
Laos	Vientiane	Embassy		
Malaysia	Putrajaya	High Commission	Countries: Eswatini; Iraq	
Malaysia	Kota Kinabalu	Consulate General	Countries: Eswatini; Iraq	
Malaysia	Kuching	Consulate General	Countries: Eswatini; Iraq	
Myanmar	Yangon	Embassy		
Oman	Muscat	Embassy	Countries: Nigeria	
Pakistan	Islamabad	High Commission		
Philippines	Manila	Embassy		
Qatar	Doha	Embassy		
Saudi Arabia	Riyadh	Embassy	International Organizations: Organisation of Islamic Cooperation	
Saudi Arabia	Jeddah	Consulate General	International Organizations: Organisation of Islamic Cooperation	
Singapore	Singapore	High Commission	Countries: Maldives; South Africa	
South Korea	Seoul	Embassy		
Republic of China (Taiwan)	Taipei	Trade & Tourism Office		
Thailand	Bangkok	Embassy		
Timor-Leste	Dili	Embassy		
Turkey	Ankara	Embassy	Countries: Bosnia and Herzegovina	
United Arab Emirates	Abu Dhabi	Embassy		
Vietnam	Hanoi	Embassy		

== Europe ==
Host country	Host city	Mission	Concurrent accreditation	Ref.
Belgium	Brussels	Embassy	Countries: Hungary; Luxembourg; Netherlands; International Organizations: European Union; OPCW	
France	Paris	Embassy	Countries: Italy; Monaco; Portugal; Spain; International Organizations: UNESCO	
Germany	Berlin	Embassy	Countries: Austria; Finland; Iceland; Norway; Poland; Switzerland	
Russia	Moscow	Embassy		
United Kingdom	London	High Commission	Countries: Greece; Ireland	

== Oceania ==
Host country	Host city	Mission	Concurrent accreditation	Ref.
Australia	Canberra	High Commission	Countries: New Zealand; Papua New Guinea	

== Multilateral organisations ==
Organization	Host city	Host country	Mission	Concurrent accreditation	Ref.
Association of Southeast Asian Nations	Jakarta	Indonesia	Permanent Mission		
United Nations	New York City	United States	Permanent Mission	Countries: Colombia; Costa Rica; Cuba; Guatemala	
United Nations	Geneva	Switzerland	Permanent Mission	International Organizations: International Atomic Energy Agency; World Trade Organization	

== Gallery ==
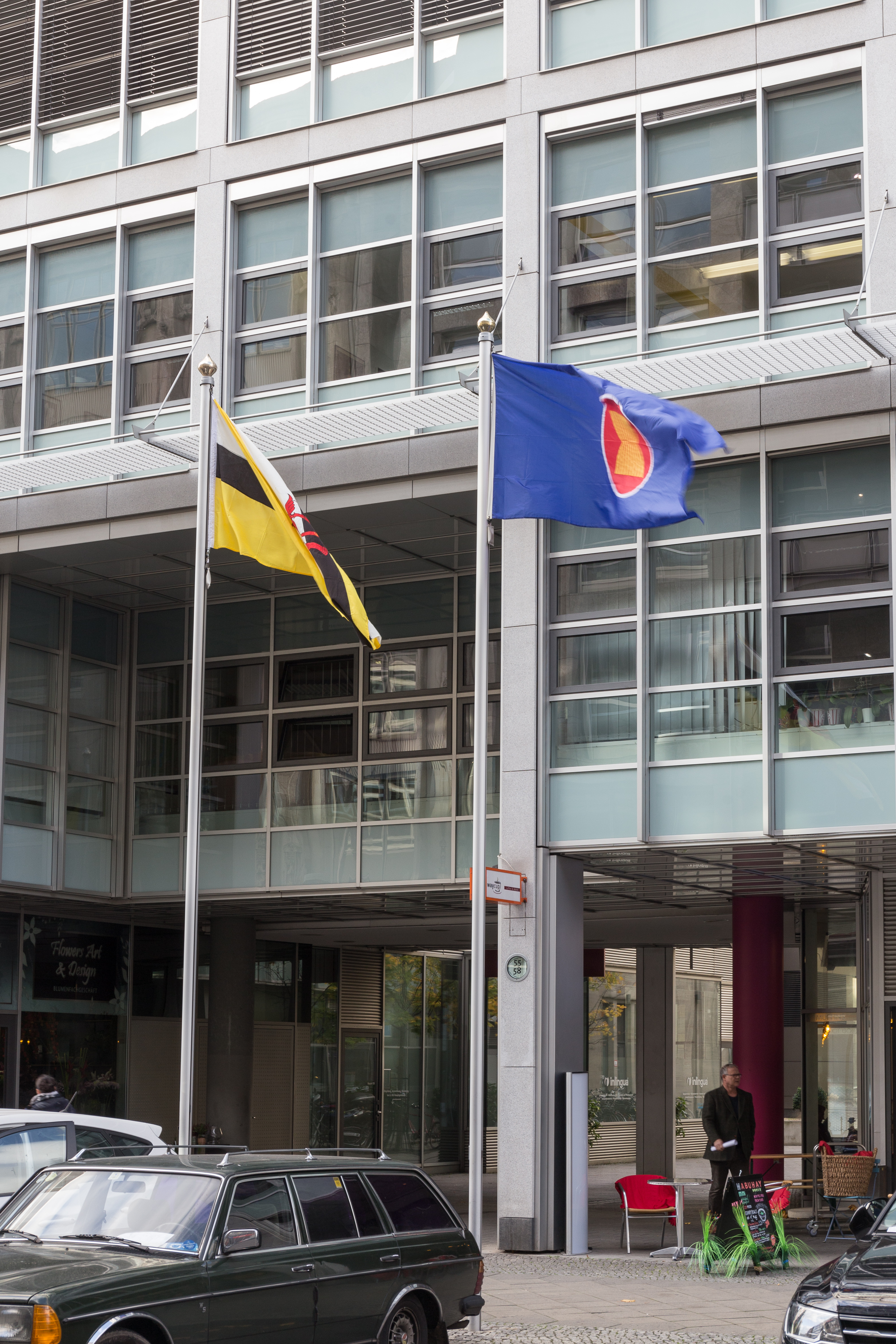
Embassy in Berlin

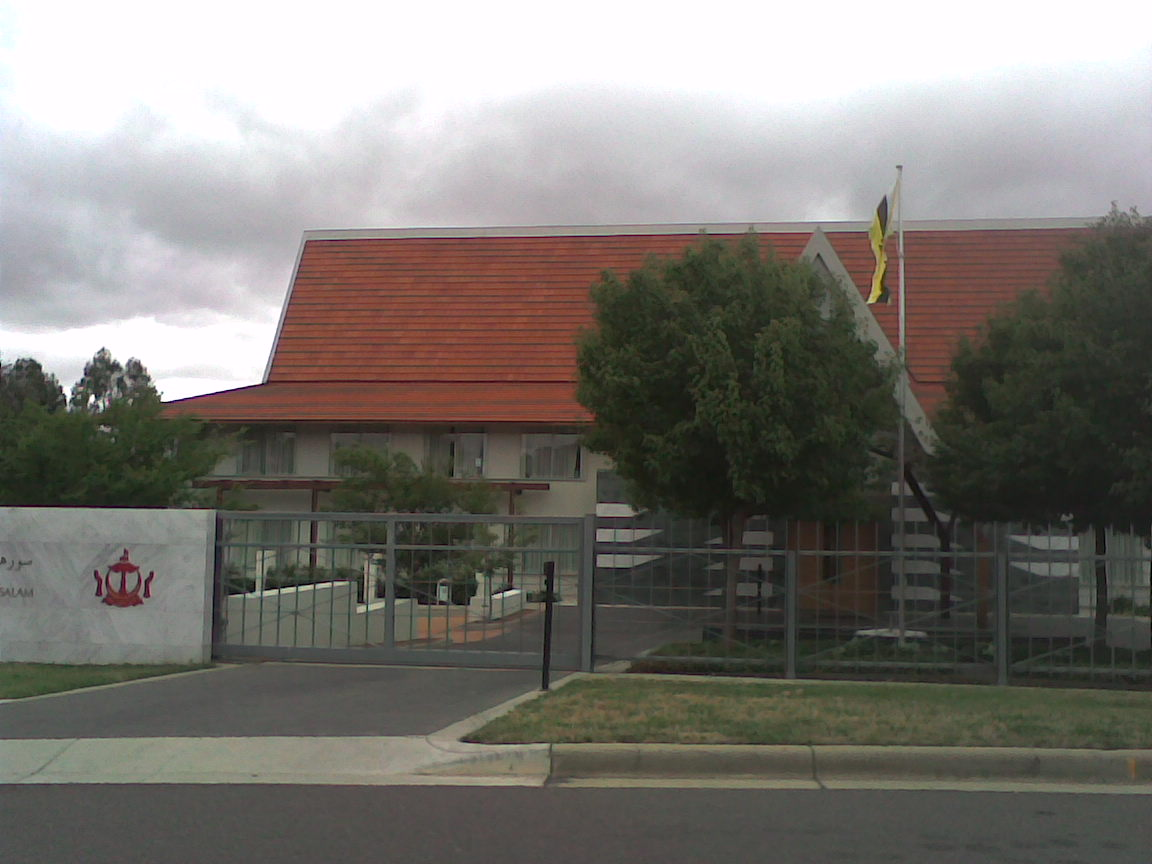
High Commission in Canberra

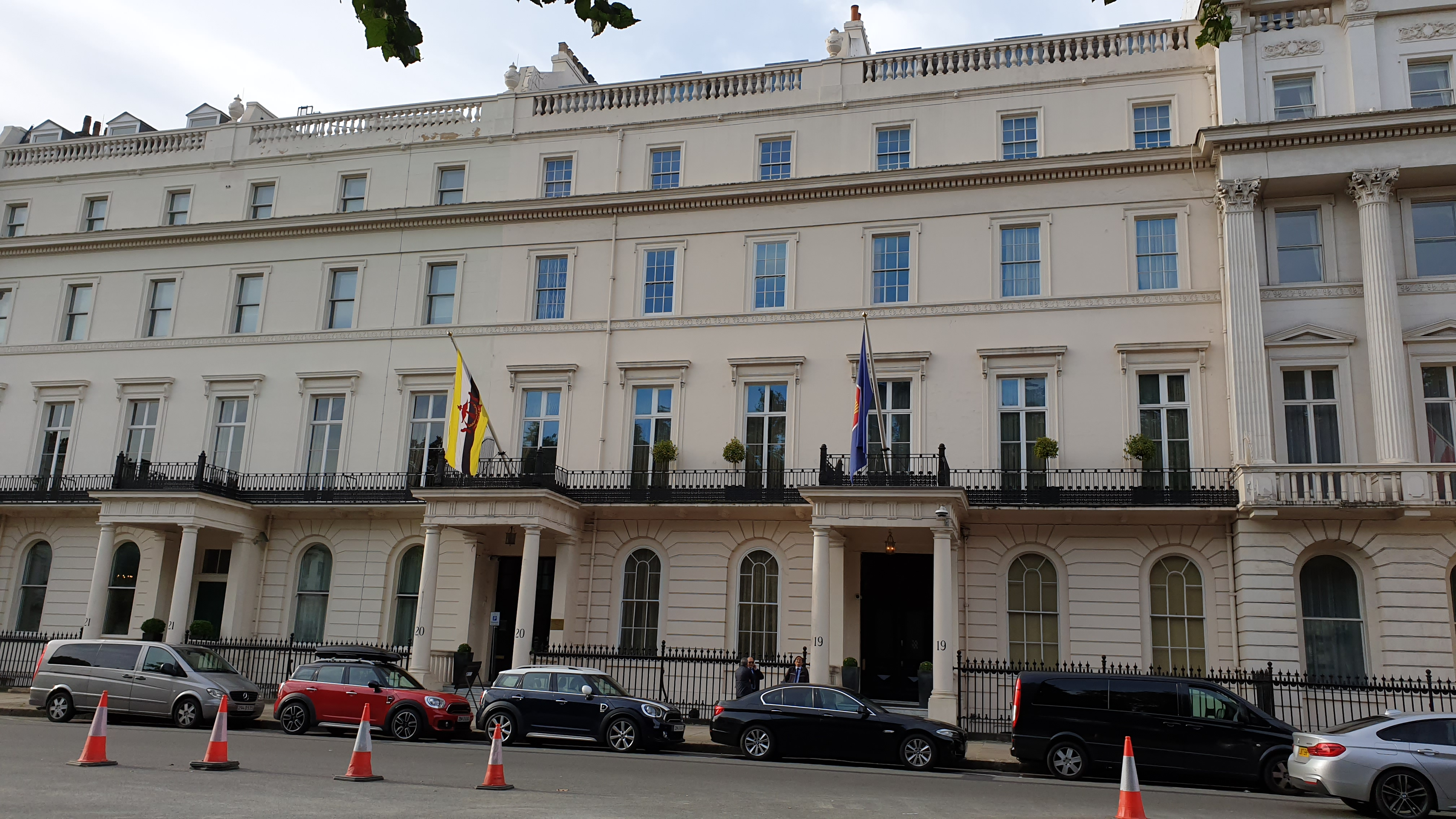
High Commission in London

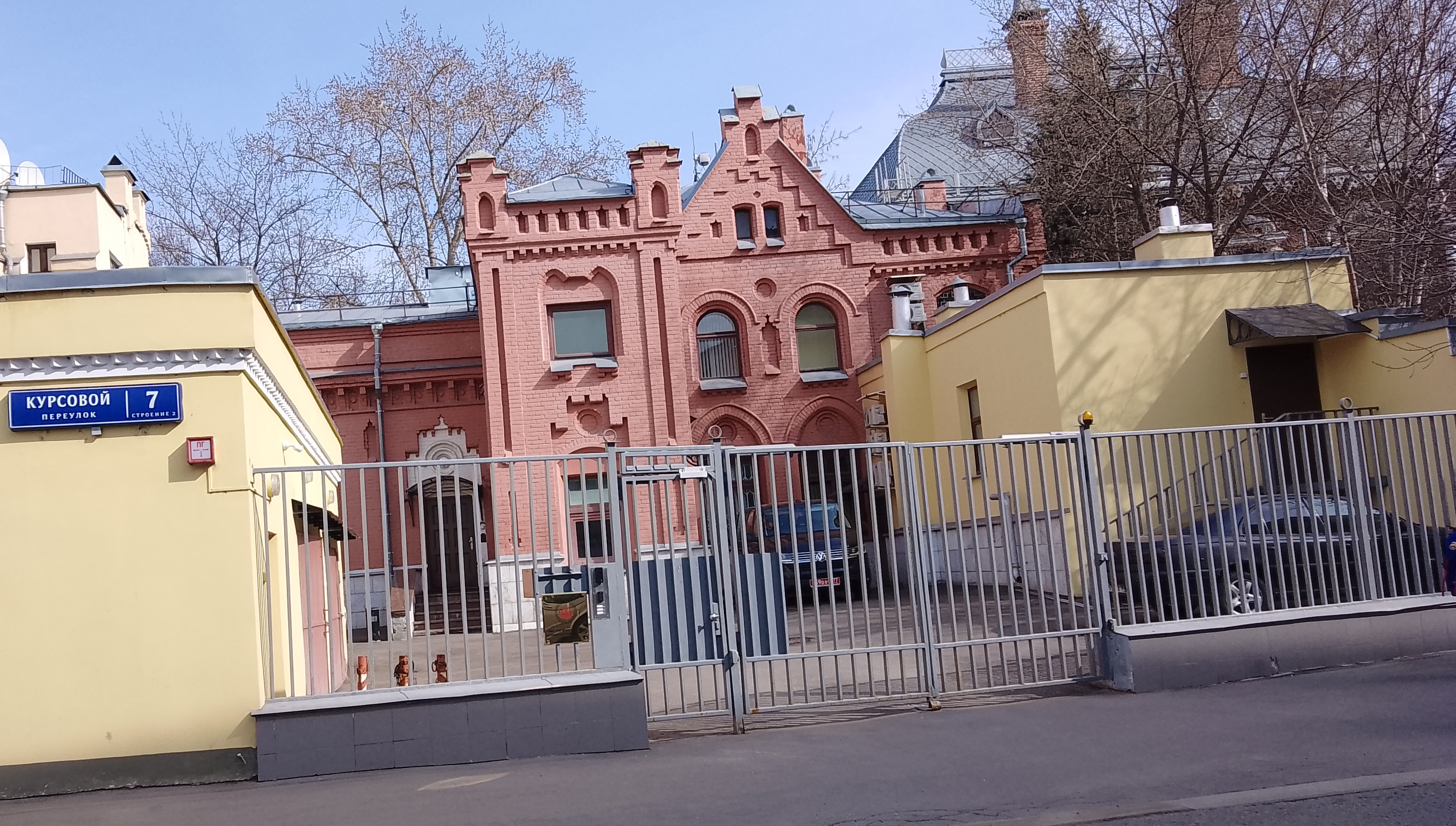
Embassy in Moscow

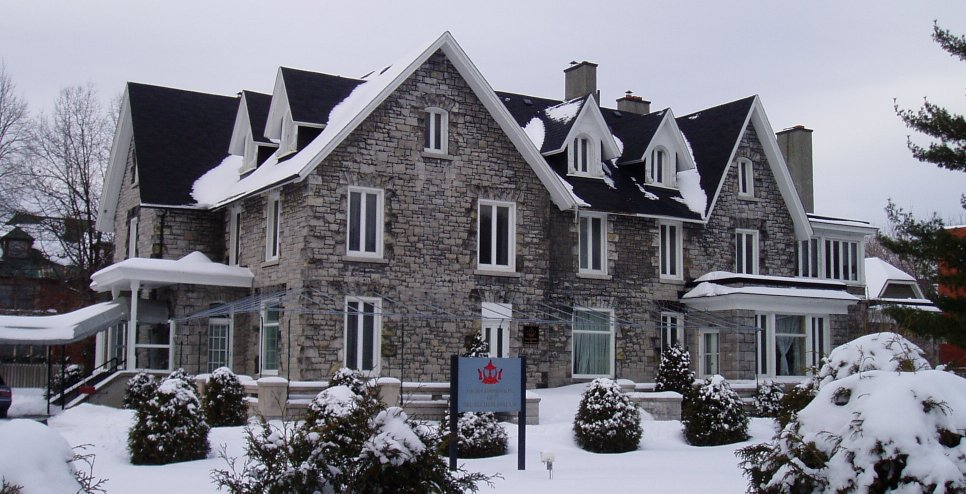
High Commission in Ottawa

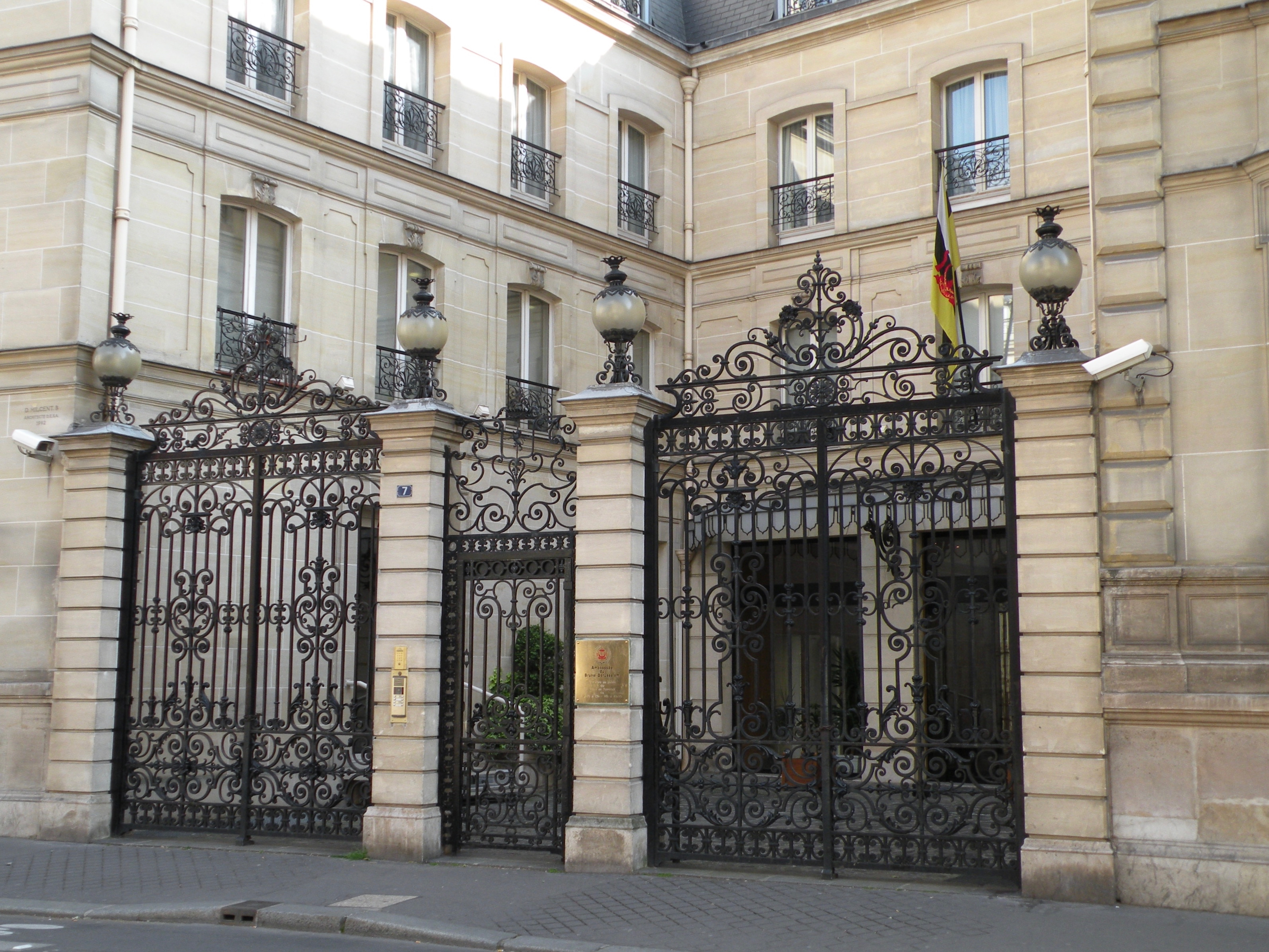
Embassy in Paris

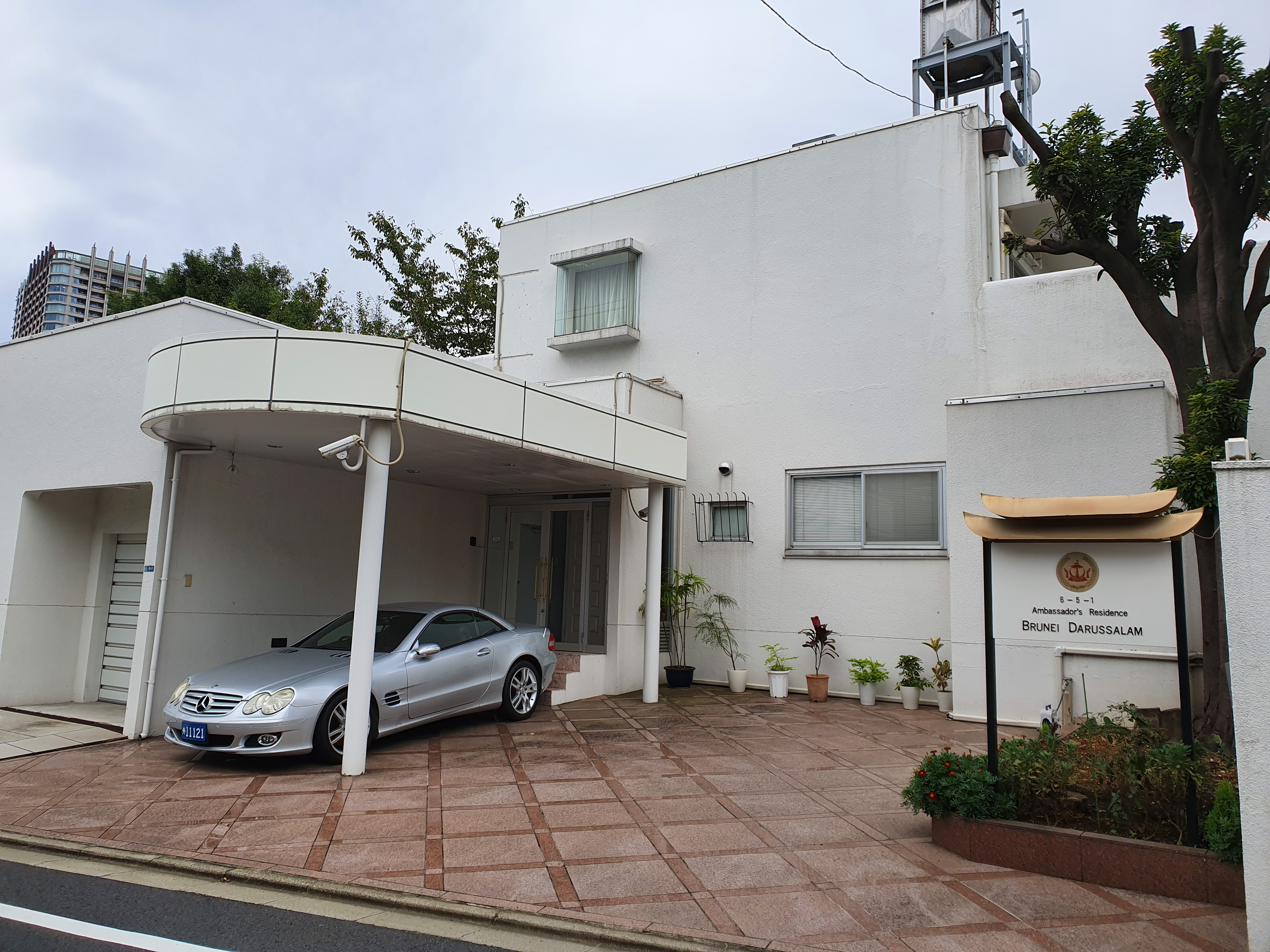
Embassy in Tokyo

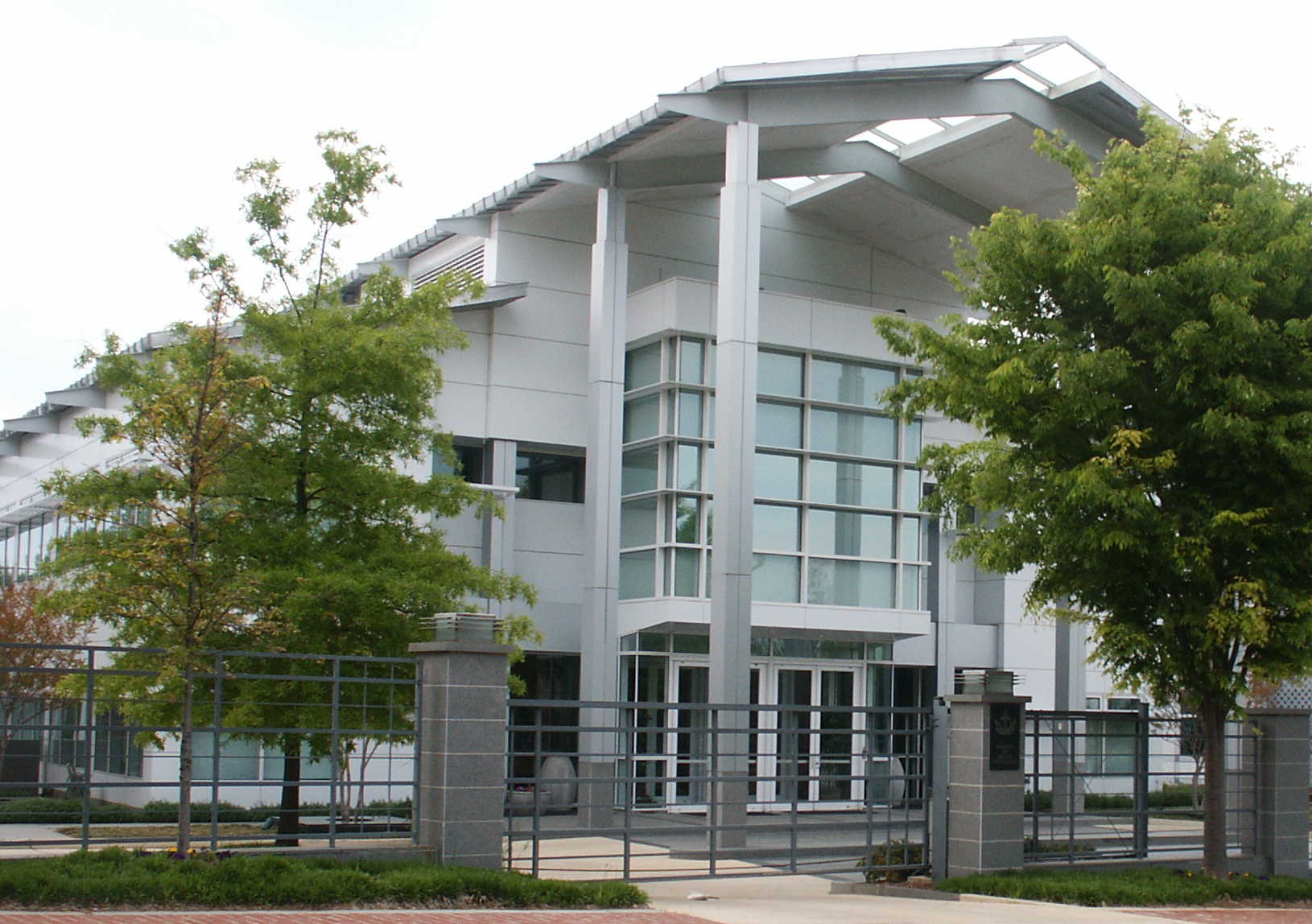
Embassy in Washington, D.C.

== See also ==
- Foreign relations of Brunei
- List of diplomatic missions in Brunei
- Visa policy of Brunei
