= Erywan Yusof =

Brunei politician

Yang Berhormat Dato Seri Setia Erywan Yusof PSNB SPMB PJK PIKB PKL
- اريوان يوسف
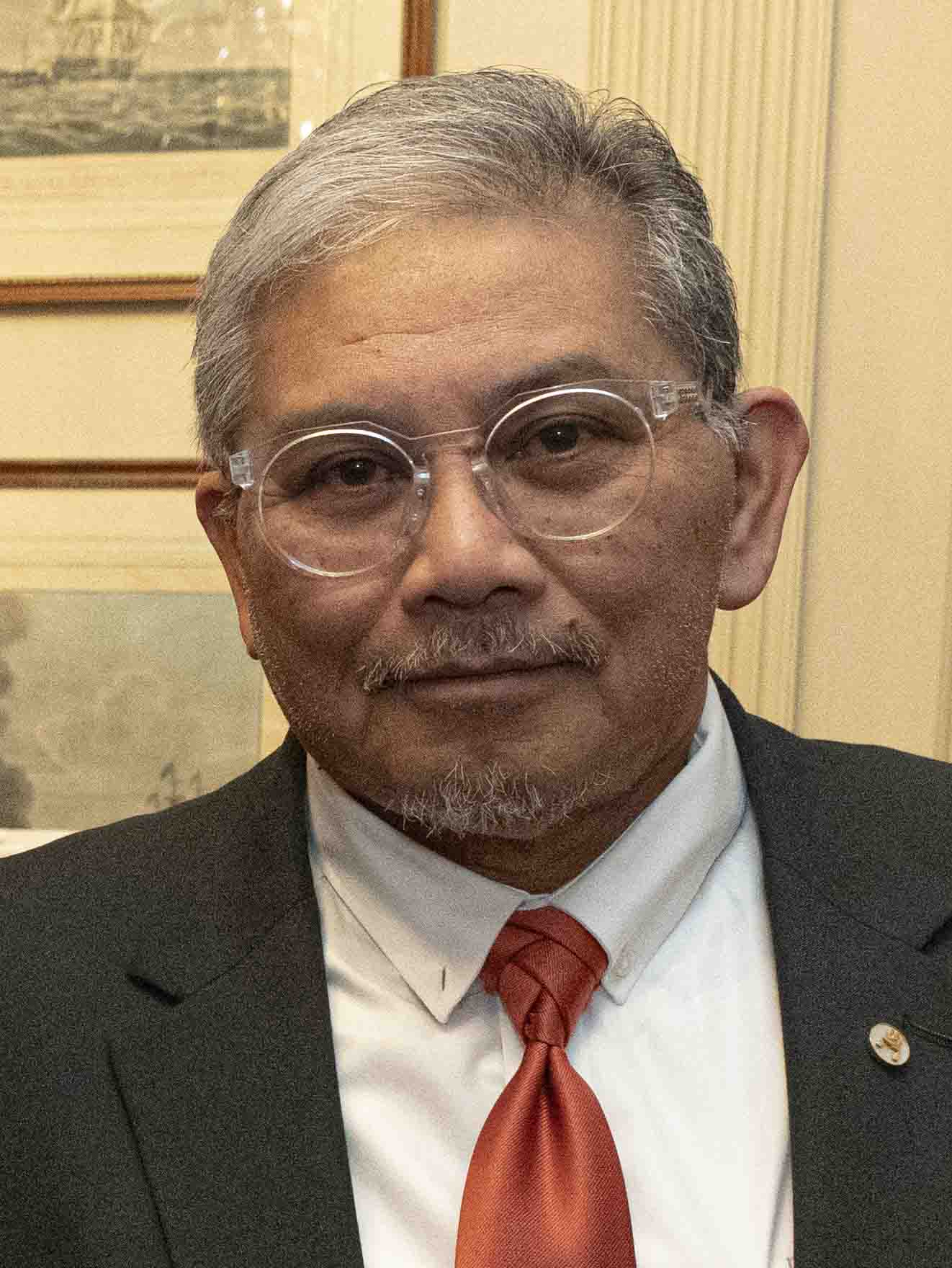
- Dato Erywan in 2018

Minister of Foreign Affairs II
- Incumbent
- Assumed office 29 January 2018
- Monarch: Hassanal Bolkiah
- Preceded by: Lim Jock Seng

Deputy Minister of Foreign Affairs and Trade
- In office 22 October 2015 – 30 January 2018
- Monarch: Hassanal Bolkiah
- Minister: Hassanal Bolkiah; Lim Jock Seng
- Preceded by: Ali Mohammad Daud

Personal details
- Spouse: Pengiran Salwana
- Education: University College Swansea
- Occupation: Diplomat

Erywan bin Haji Mohd. Yusof is the incumbent 2nd Minister of Foreign Affairs of Brunei. He also served as ASEAN's first special envoy to Myanmar from August to December 2021 following the Myanmar coup d'état and the resulting civil war.

== Education ==
Dato Erywan graduated from University College Swansea (now Swansea University) in 1991 with a Master of Science degree in Genetics and its Applications.

== Political career ==
Erywan was appointed deputy minister of foreign affairs in the 2015 cabinet reshuffle on 22 October, and subsequently appointed deputy chairman of the Brunei Strategy Council in November 2015 and of the Brunei Economic Development Board in 2016. Following a cabinet reshuffle on 30 January 2018, he was appointed as minister of foreign affairs II.

=== ASEAN Special Envoy to Myanmar ===
On 4 August 2021, ASEAN Foreign Ministers selected Dato Erywan as the Special Envoy of the ASEAN Chair to Myanmar, to help mediate the country's crisis following the February 2021 Myanmar coup d'état. He had previously been instrumental in helping to draft the Five-Point Consensus (5PC) in April 2021, which was subsequently adopted by the ASEAN Leaders' meeting in Jakarta, Indonesia. United Nations Secretary-General António Guterres welcomed Dato Erywan's appointment as a positive step towards promoting dialogue and consultation in view of Dato Erywan's extensive experience as a negotiator. However, 413 civil society organisations in Myanmar publicly criticized ASEAN's appointment of Dato Erywan for excluding the exiled National Unity Government (NUG), civil society, and pro-democracy forces such as the Civil Disobedience Movement (CDM) from the decision-making process.

On 6 October, Dato Erywan expressed serious concerns with the SAC's lack of progress in implementing the 5PC, signaling that ASEAN may not invite the SAC, to the ASEAN Summit later that month. On 4 October 2023, Yusof was denied by the military junta his request to meet with jailed leader Aung San Suu Kyi and other political prisoners, only allowing a meeting with former vice president Henry Van Thio and former assembly speaker T Khun Myat, both of whom were under house arrest at the time. Ten days later, he abruptly cancelled his visit to Myanmar. Min Aung Hlaing was ultimately barred from attending the summit on 26 October. Hun Sen signaled he may replace Yusof with Cambodia's incumbent foreign minister Prak Sokhonn, who has criticized the Burmese military regime, when Cambodia chairs ASEAN next year. Sokhonn succeeded Yusof as special envoy on 1 January 2022.

Following another cabinet reshuffle in Brunei on 7 June 2022, Erywan retained his position as 2nd minister of foreign affairs.

== Personal life ==
Dato Erywan is married to Pengiran Datin Hajah Salwana binti Pengiran Haji Ibrahim.

== Honours ==
Throughout his career, he has earned the following honours:

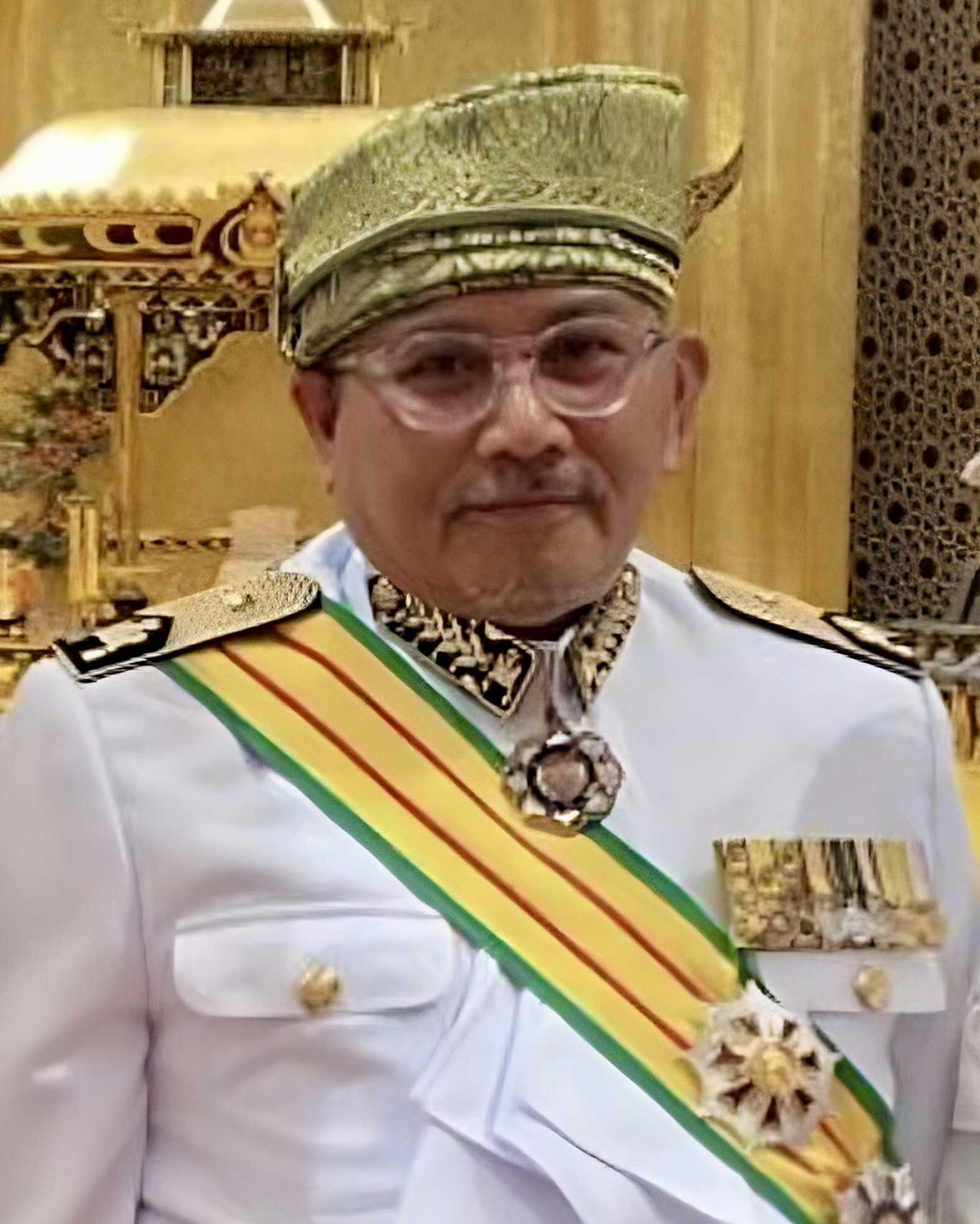
Erywan in 2023

=== National ===
- Order of Setia Negara Brunei First Class (PSNB) – Dato Seri Setia
- Order of Seri Paduka Mahkota Brunei First Class (SPMB; 15 July 2017) – Dato Seri Paduka
- Order of Seri Paduka Mahkota Brunei Second Class (DPMB; 15 July 2010) – Dato Paduka
- Meritorious Service Medal (PJK)
- Excellent Service Medal (PIKB)

=== Foreign ===
- Japan:
  - First Class of the Order of the Rising Sun (29 April 2023)

== See also ==
- List of current foreign ministers
- Cabinet of Brunei

Political offices
Preceded by Lim Jock Seng	Minister of Foreign Affairs II; 30 January 2018 – present	Succeeded by Incumbent
Preceded by Ali Mohammad Daud	Deputy Minister of Foreign Affairs and Trade; 22 October 2015 – 30 January 2018	Succeeded by Incumbent
