= Brunei–Oman relations =

- Brunei: Oman

Brunei and Oman established diplomatic relations in 1984. Brunei has an embassy in Muscat, and Oman has an embassy in Bandar Seri Begawan. Both countries are members of the Organisation of Islamic Cooperation.

== History ==
Relations have been established since 24 March 1984 with both countries former protectorates of European powers, such as the British for Brunei and the Portuguese for Oman, and both are now governed by an Islamic absolute monarchy.

On 3 November 2026, Sultan Hassanal Bolkiah of Brunei and Sultan Haitham bin Tariq of Oman met in the Istana Nurul Iman to strengthen bilateral ties, culminating in a joint declaration elevating their relationship to a strategic partnership. Key agreements included mutual visa exemptions for certain passport holders and discussions on enhancing cooperation in energy, manufacturing, mining, petrochemicals, food security, and aquaculture. Several memorandums of understanding were signed, focusing on labor development, healthcare, economic planning, and agriculture.

== Economic relations ==
Several memorandum of understanding have been signed between the two countries such as agreement between the Universiti Brunei Darussalam with the Sultan Qaboos University in education sector and the establishment of Omani-Brunei Investment Company. There is also a co-operation in telecommunications between Telekom Brunei and Bahwan CyberTek with a joint-venture between the two companies.

== See also ==
- Foreign relations of Brunei
- Foreign relations of Oman
