= Brunei–New Zealand relations =

- Brunei: New Zealand

Brunei and New Zealand established diplomatic relations in 1984. Brunei high commission in Bandar Seri Begawan is accredited to New Zealand, while New Zealand high commission in Kuala Lumpur is accredited to Brunei. Both countries are members of the Commonwealth of Nations.

== History ==
Relations between the two countries has been established since 5 May 1984. The relations have always friendly and positive with such co-operation in education trade and defence.

== Economic relations ==
Several memorandum of understanding has been signed between the two countries. In 2012, the total trade reached NZ$1.2 billion with New Zealand main exports to Brunei were dairy product while Brunei main exports New Zealand mainly in crude oil.

== Education relations ==
In education, a memorandum of understanding has been signed between the Bruneian government and the University of Otago in which it would take a small number of medical and dental students from Brunei to New Zealand. Lincoln University also has a links with Brunei and currently there are approximately 100 Bruneian students who studied in New Zealand with Brunei are regularly recruits many teachers from the country.

== Security relations ==
An ongoing defence relations were conducted mainly in military exercises and training assistance.

== See also ==
- Foreign relations of Brunei
- Foreign relations of New Zealand
