= Brunei–Qatar relations =

- Brunei: Qatar

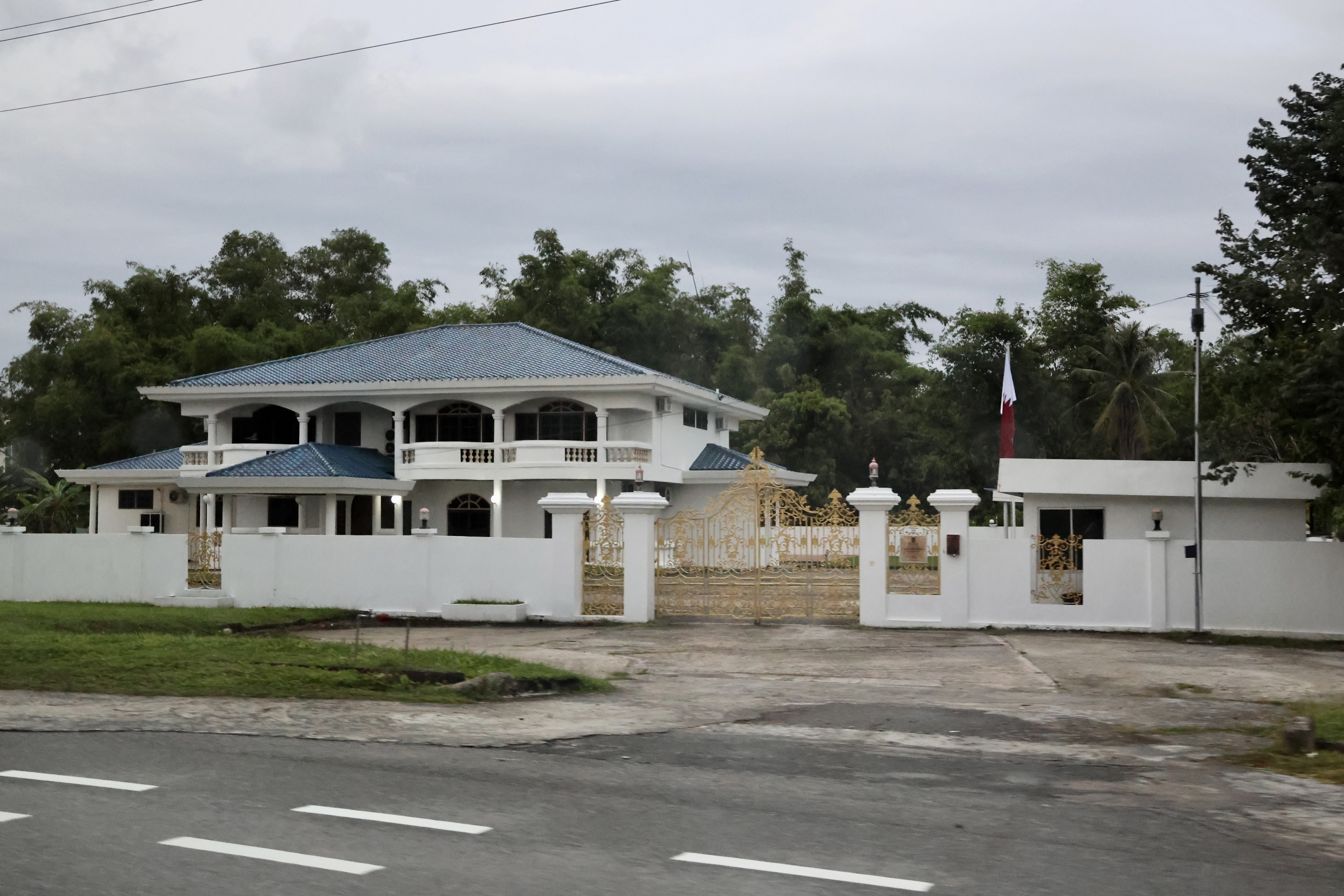
Qatari embassy in Kampong Beribi

Brunei and Qatar established diplomatic relations in 1991. Brunei has an embassy in Doha, and Qatar has an embassy in Bandar Seri Begawan.

== History ==
Relations between the two countries have been established since 2 October 1991. Brunei opened its embassy in Qatar in 2001, while Qatar opened its embassy in Brunei in 2008.

== Economic relations ==
Two memorandum of understanding such as cultural and education co-operation including two agreements on avoidance of double taxation and commercial and technical co-operation between both countries government has been signed to further strengthen ties between the two countries. There is also a co-operation in sport between the two countries. Currently, there are a small number of Bruneian expatriates in Qatar who are mainly engineers and technicians working with QatarEnergy LNG and QatarEnergy.
