= Brunei–Russia relations =

- Brunei: Russia

Brunei and Russia established diplomatic relations in 1991. Brunei maintains an embassy in Moscow, while Russia has an embassy in Bandar Seri Begawan.

== Background of Soviet-era relations ==
In 1987, Mikhail Gorbachev called for the establishment of diplomatic relations with Brunei. Although the Soviet ambassador to Singapore attempted to establish said relations with Brunei in 1988, the Sultanate was unprepared to establish relations with the Communist state at the time. On 1 October 1991, Brunei established relations with the Soviet Union.

== Post-Soviet relations ==
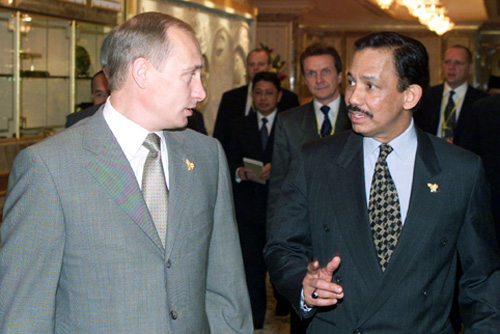
President Vladimir Putin with Hassanal Bolkiah in Bandar Seri Begawan in 2000.

In 2000, President Vladimir Putin arrived in Brunei for an Asia-Pacific Economic Cooperation summit, and met with the Sultan of Brunei, Hassanal Bolkiah, in the Nurul Iman Palace.

On 10 June 2005, the Sultan of Brunei, Hassanal Bolkiah, made the first official visit to Russia by a head of state of Brunei. According to Gennady Chufrin, Corresponding Member of the Russian Academy of Sciences, the visit marked a serious step towards the establishment of bilateral relations.

On 1 December 2008, Prime Minister Vladimir Putin signed an order to establish a Russian embassy in Bandar Seri Begawan. Andrei Nesterenko, the spokesman for the Russian Ministry of Foreign Affairs said that the establishment of a Russian embassy in the Brunei capital would help to intensify issues surrounding the Brunei–Russia relationship.

As of January 2018, Brunei and Russia maintain a visa-free regime for ordinary passport holders, for visits up to 14 days, for a maximum total stay of 90 days within any 180 day period.
