= List of diplomatic missions in Brunei =

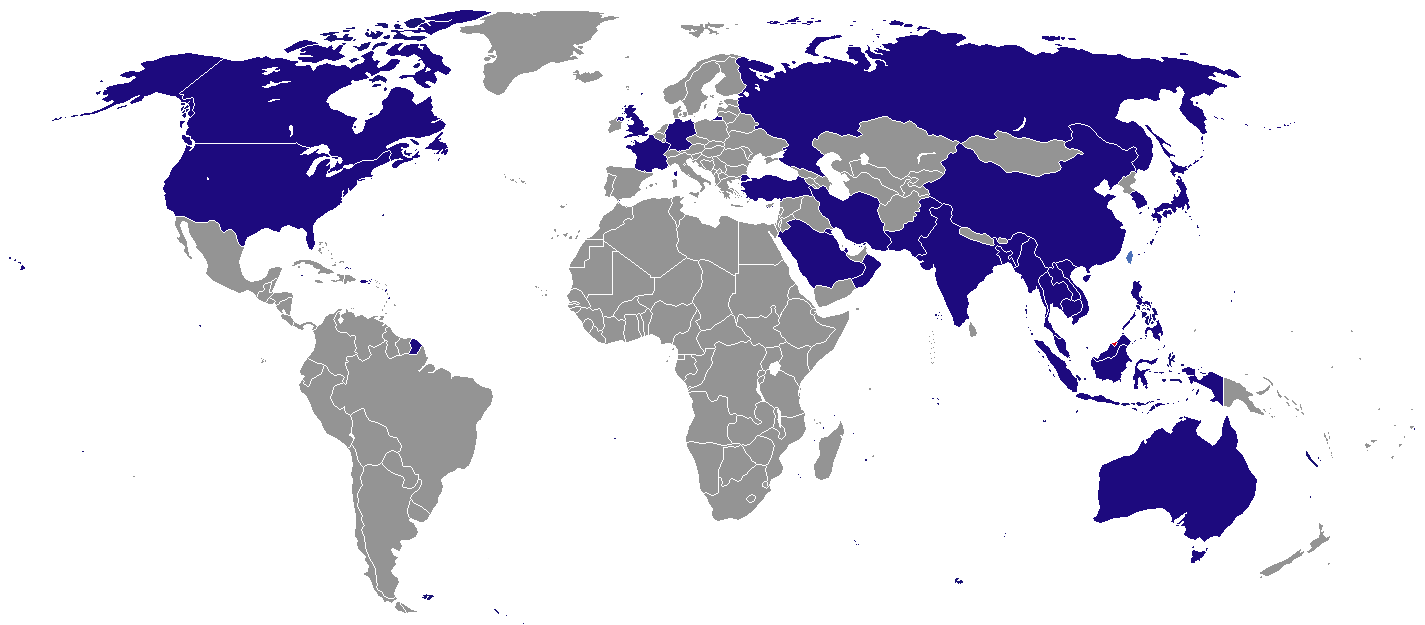
Map of countries with diplomatic missions in Brunei

This is a list of diplomatic missions in Brunei. Bandar Seri Begawan, the capital, hosts 29 embassies.

Several other countries and the European Union have diplomatic missions accredited from other capitals.

== History ==
Until 1984, Brunei was a British protectorate, with international representation being the responsibility of the United Kingdom, which was represented by a High Commissioner, and before 1959, by a Resident, responsible for defence and external affairs. Shortly before full independence, other countries began opening missions in Brunei, with Malaysia opening a Government Agency in 1982, which was later upgraded to a Commission, along with its Singapore counterpart. Following independence and Brunei joining the Commonwealth, these became known as High Commissions. Similarly, the United States' consulate-general, established shortly before independence in December 1983, became an embassy.

== Resident Diplomatic Missions in Bandar Seri Begawan ==
=== Embassies & High Commissions ===
Entries marked with an asterisk (*) are member-states of the Commonwealth of Nations. As such, their embassies are formally termed as "high commissions".

1. Australia*
2. Bangladesh*
3. Cambodia
4. Canada*
5. China
6. France
7. Germany
8. India*
9. Indonesia
10. Iran
11. Japan
12. Kuwait
13. Laos
14. Malaysia*
15. Myanmar
16. Oman
17. Pakistan*
18. Philippines
19. Qatar
20. Russia
21. Saudi Arabia
22. Singapore*
23. South Korea
24. Thailand
25. Timor-Leste
26. Turkey
27. United Kingdom*
28. United States
29. Vietnam

=== Other missions ===
- Republic of China (Taiwan) (Economic & Cultural Office)

== Gallery ==
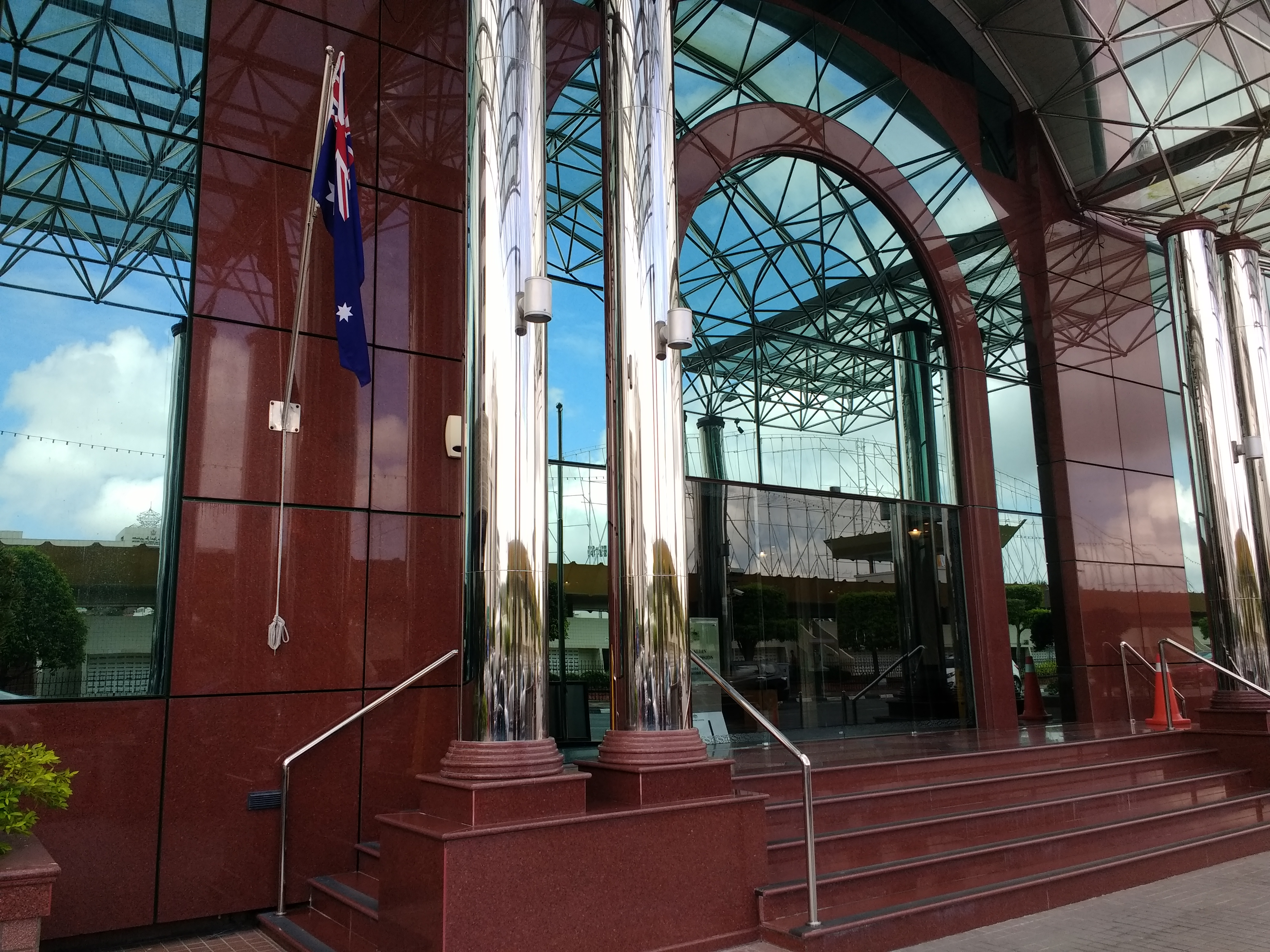
High Commission of Australia

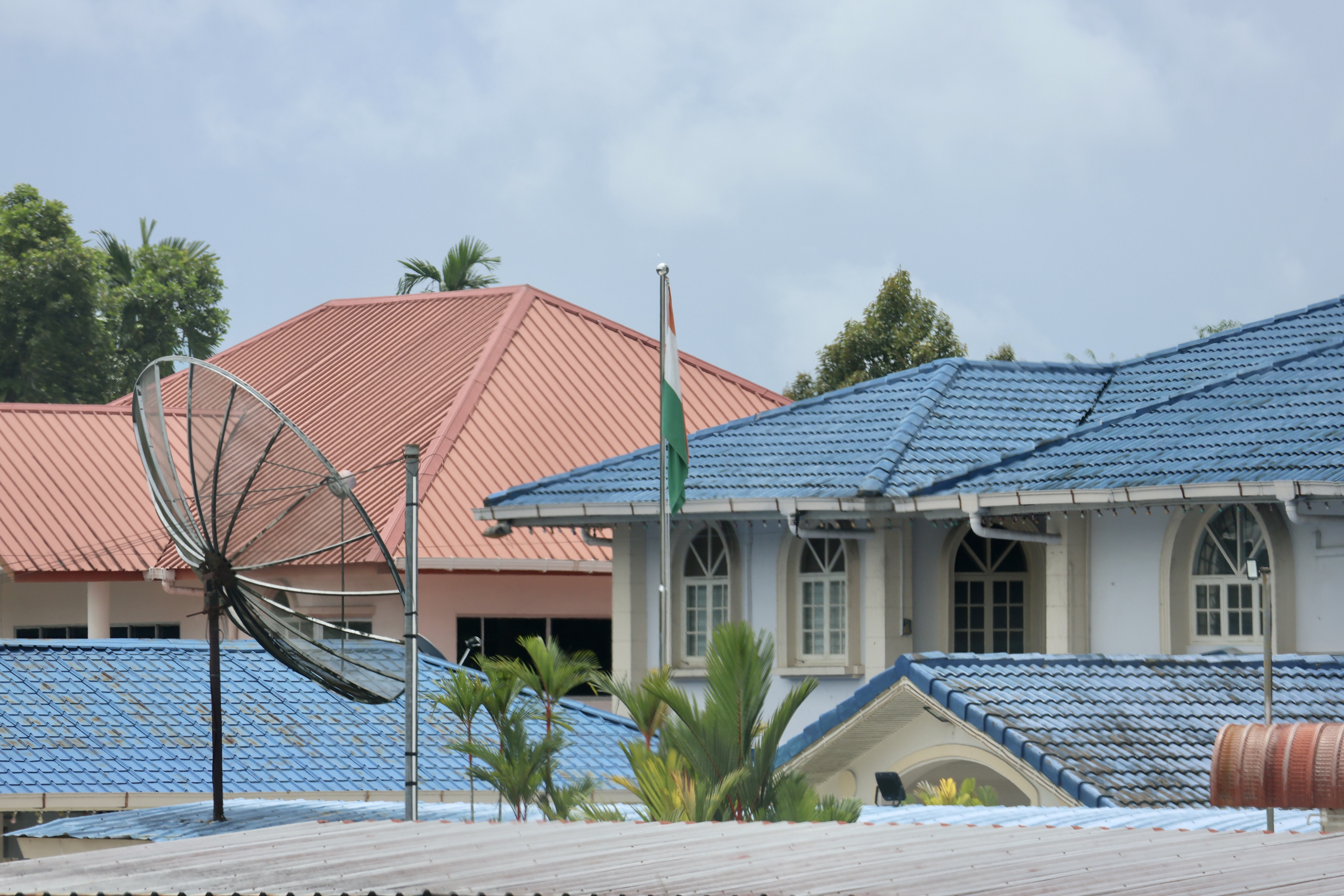
High Commission of India

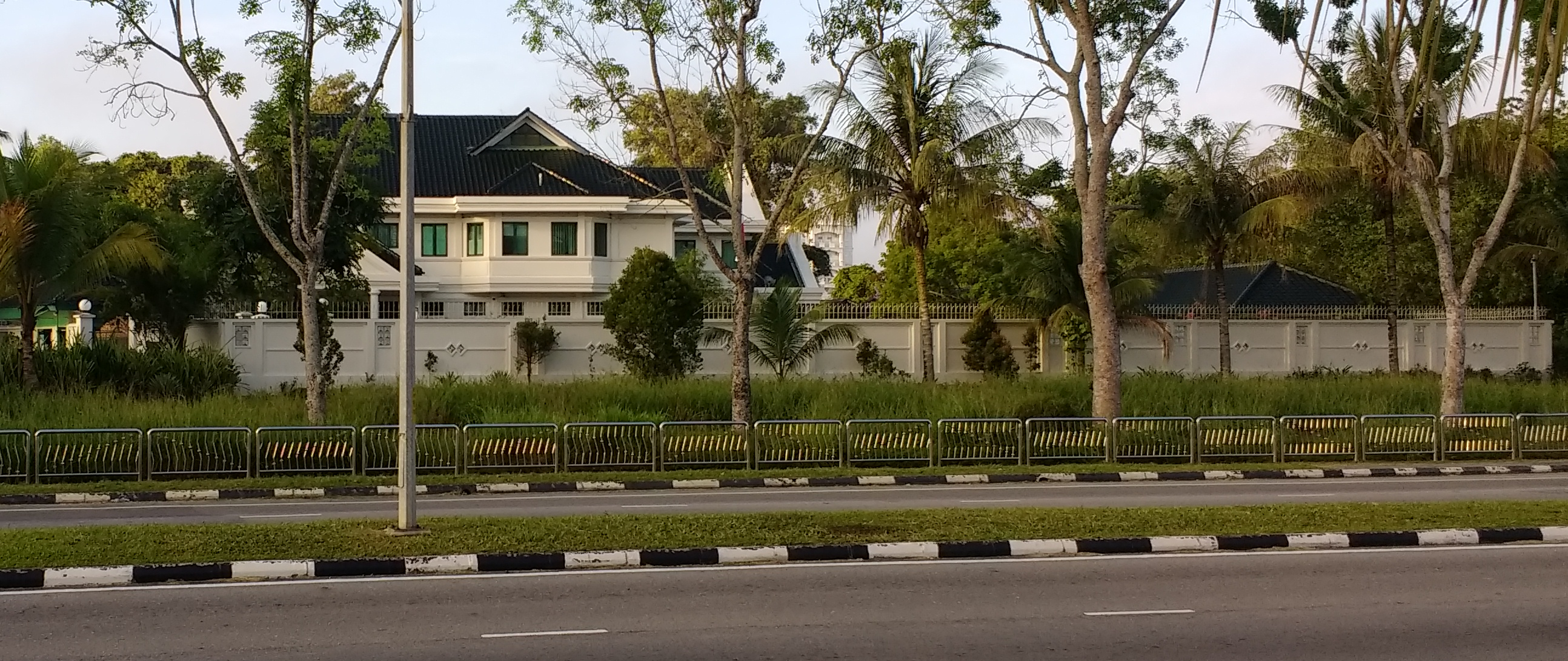
Embassy of Japan

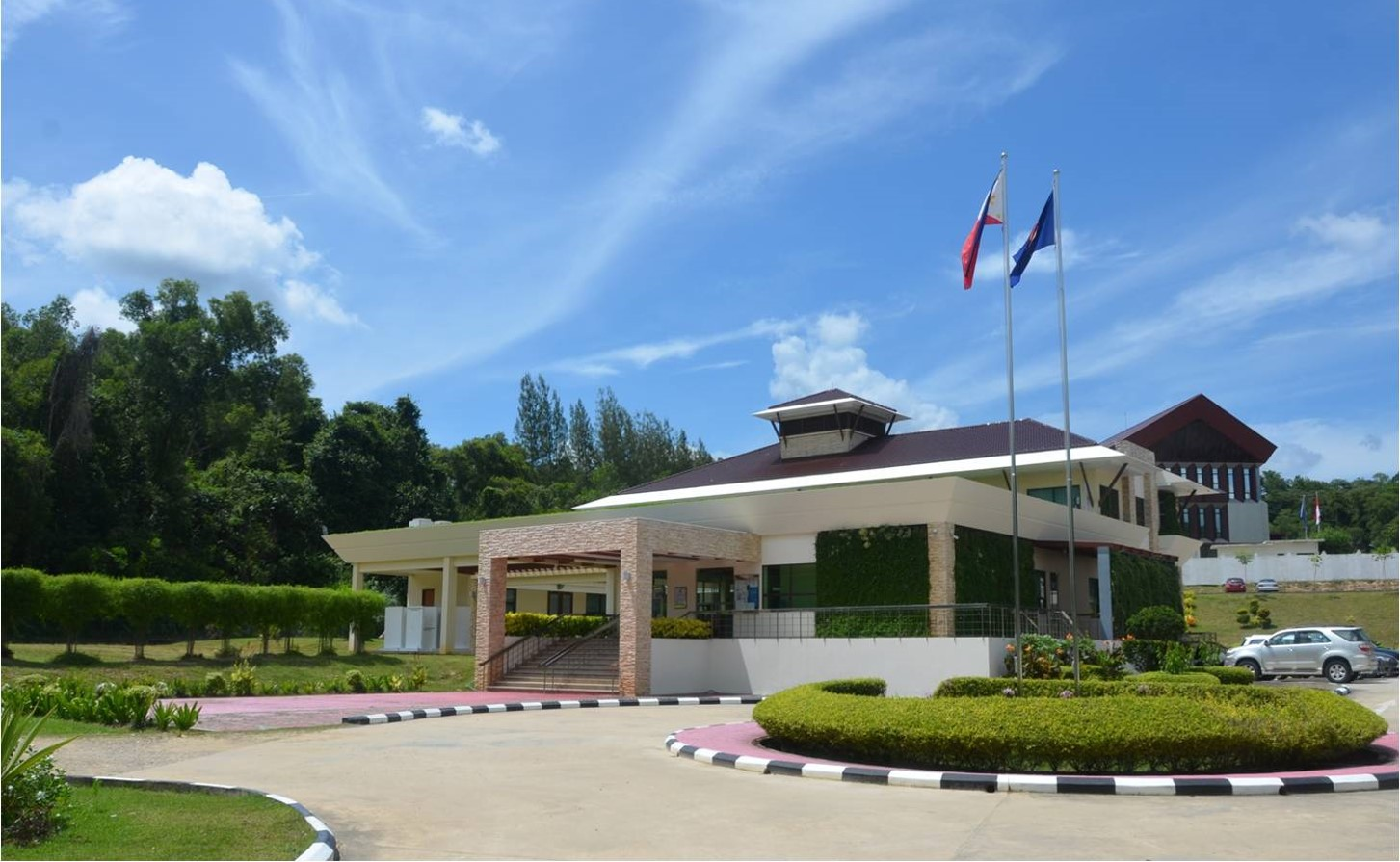
Embassy of the Philippines

== Non-resident embassies & high commissions accredited to Brunei ==
=== Resident in Beijing, China ===
1. Comoros
2. El Salvador
3. Trinidad and Tobago

=== Resident in Jakarta, Indonesia ===
1. Algeria
2. Angola
3. Armenia
4. Bulgaria
5. Cyprus
6. Czechia
7. Ecuador
8. Ethiopia
9. European Union
10. Guatemala
11. Jordan
12. Libya
13. Mauritania
14. Mozambique
15. North Korea
16. Portugal
17. Serbia
18. Somalia
19. Tunisia
20. Yemen

=== Resident in Kuala Lumpur, Malaysia ===
1. Afghanistan
2. Argentina
3. Austria
4. Azerbaijan
5. Bahrain
6. Belgium
7. Bosnia and Herzegovina
8. Brazil
9. Chile
10. Croatia
11. Cuba
12. Egypt
13. Eswatini
14. Finland
15. Georgia
16. Ghana
17. Guinea
18. Holy See (Details)
19. Iraq
20. Kazakhstan
21. Kenya
22. Kyrgyzstan
23. Lebanon
24. Maldives
25. Mauritius
26. Morocco
27. Namibia
28. Nepal
29. New Zealand
30. Nigeria
31. Norway
32. Palestine
33. Peru
34. Poland
35. Romania
36. Senegal
37. Slovakia
38. South Africa
39. Spain
40. Sudan
41. Syria
42. Tanzania
43. Turkmenistan
44. Uganda
45. United Arab Emirates
46. Uruguay
47. Uzbekistan
48. Venezuela
49. Zambia
50. Zimbabwe

=== Resident in New Delhi, India ===
1. Congo-Brazzaville
2. Eritrea
3. Guyana
4. Mali
5. Niger
6. Seychelles

=== Resident in Seoul, South Korea ===
1. Dominican Republic
2. Ivory Coast
3. Sierra Leone

=== Resident in Singapore ===
1. Colombia
2. Costa Rica
3. Denmark
4. Greece
5. Estonia
6. Hungary
7. Ireland
8. Italy
9. Lithuania
10. Mexico
11. Mongolia
12. Netherlands
13. Panama
14. Rwanda
15. Sri Lanka
16. Sweden
17. Switzerland
18. Ukraine

=== Resident in Tokyo, Japan ===
1. Benin
2. Fiji
3. Iceland
4. Madagascar
5. Malawi
6. Marshall Islands
7. Paraguay
8. Togo

=== Resident elsewhere ===
1. Burkina Faso (Riyadh)
2. Chad (Riyadh)
3. Haiti (Hanoi)
4. Honduras (Washington, D.C.)
5. Nicaragua (Kuwait City)
6. Papua New Guinea (Manila)
7. Tonga (Canberra)

== See also ==
- List of diplomatic missions of Brunei
- Visa requirements for Bruneian citizens
